= List of Vancouver SkyTrain stations =

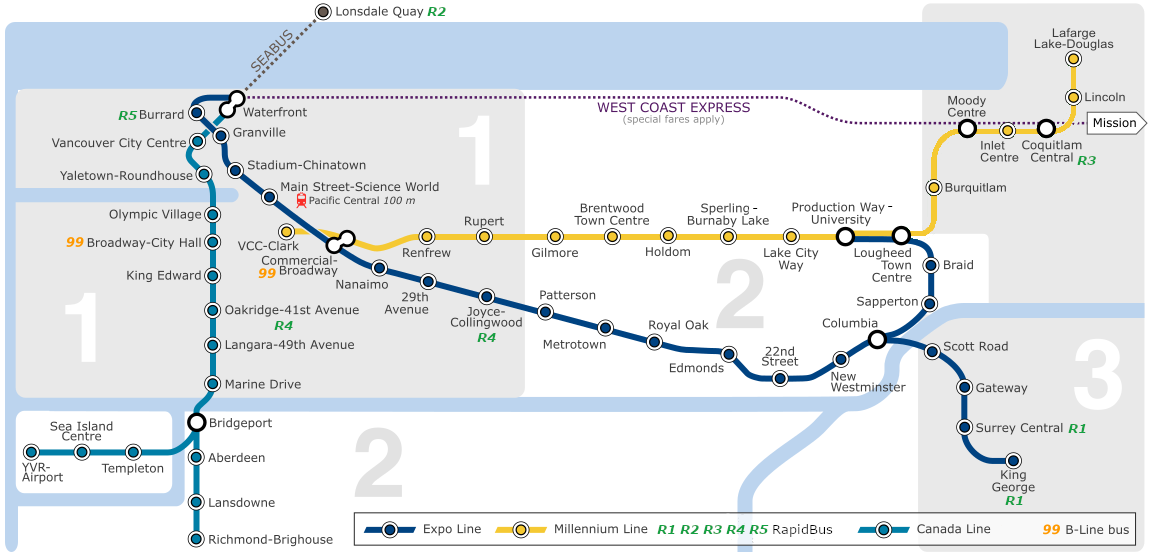
SkyTrain system map

The Vancouver SkyTrain is a three-line urban mass transit system in the metropolitan area of Vancouver, British Columbia, managed by TransLink. The Expo Line was built for the Expo 86 World's Fair; the Millennium Line opened in 2002, followed by the Canada Line in 2009, which was built for the 2010 Winter Olympics. The Expo and Millennium Lines are operated by the British Columbia Rapid Transit Company on behalf of TransLink. The Canada Line is owned by InTransitBC, and operated by ProTrans BC, an AtkinsRéalis company. The Expo and Millennium Lines use Bombardier's Advanced Rapid Transit technology, while the Canada Line technology is provided by Hyundai Rotem. The SkyTrain is the oldest and one of the longest fully automated driverless rapid transit systems in the world.

The SkyTrain was conceived as a legacy project of Expo 86; its first line, the Expo Line, was finished in 1985, in time to showcase the fair's theme: Transportation and Communication. The line connected Vancouver with the cities of Burnaby and New Westminster, with the terminus stations at Waterfront and New Westminster station. In 1989, the line was extended one station east to Columbia station. The Skybridge, the only cable-stayed bridge built for transit use in the world, was completed in 1990, extending the Expo Line eastward to the city of Surrey with the addition of Scott Road station. The line was extended eastward again with the opening of Gateway, Surrey Central, and King George stations in 1994.

TransLink, which took over BC Transit's responsibility for the operation of the SkyTrain in 1998, proposed a two-phase expansion of the system: the first phase consisted of a CA$1.2-billion new line from New Westminster to the Broadway campus of Vancouver Community College in Vancouver via Lougheed Town Centre in Burnaby. The second phase was a $730-million extension eastward from Lougheed Town Centre to Coquitlam Centre in Coquitlam via Port Moody and another extension westward from Vancouver Community College to Granville Street via the Broadway corridor. The expansion line, now known as the Millennium Line, began operating in 2002. The line connected to the Expo Line at Columbia and originally added eleven new stations to the system; the twelfth, Lake City Way, opened in 2003. The Millennium Line's thirteenth station and current western terminus, VCC–Clark, opened in 2006. The second phase was subsequently cancelled, later revived and eventually branded the Evergreen Extension. The extension opened in 2016, expanding service into Coquitlam via Burnaby and Port Moody with 6 new stations, adding 11 kilometres (6.8 mi) to the existing Millennium Line. The extension stretches from Lougheed Town Centre station to Lafarge Lake–Douglas station, which is located beside Lafarge Lake and across from the David Lam campus of Douglas College in Coquitlam City Centre.

In 2004, TransLink approved a 19-kilometre (12 mi) line connecting Vancouver with Richmond and the Vancouver International Airport (YVR). The line, now known as the Canada Line, opened in 2009, a few months ahead of the 2010 Olympics. The line added 15 stations to the system, and has two branches that split off at Bridgeport; one branch heads south to the city of Richmond, while the other heads west toward the main terminal at YVR.

There are 54 stations on the SkyTrain system. 20 stations are served exclusively by the Expo Line, 14 exclusively by the Millennium Line, 15 exclusively by the Canada Line, 1 by both the Expo and Canada Lines, and 3 by both the Expo and Millennium Lines. Vancouver and Burnaby have a total of 31 stations, 20 and 11 respectively, consisting of 58 percent of the system's stations. Commercial–Broadway was originally two separate stations—Broadway station and Commercial Drive station; Broadway was completed with the Expo Line, while Commercial Drive was completed with the Millennium Line. The stations combined in 2009 in order to avoid confusion with Broadway–City Hall. From the Millennium Line's start of operation in 2002 until 2016, all Expo Line stations outside of Surrey were also serviced by the Millennium Line until TransLink changed the operating patterns of both lines. Since 2016, Braid and Sapperton have been serviced by the Expo Line instead of the Millennium Line via a branch from Columbia heading north towards Production Way–University, a major bus transfer point for Simon Fraser University's Burnaby campus. The Millennium Line heads east from VCC–Clark to Larfarge Lake–Douglas, connecting with the Expo Line at Production Way–University and Lougheed Town Centre stations. Waterfront is the terminus for both the Expo and Canada Lines. Richmond–Brighouse and YVR–Airport are the outbound terminuses for the two Canada Line branches.

== Key ==
*	Transfer station
†	Terminus
**	Transfer station and terminus

== Stations ==
Station	Line(s)	Municipality	Zone (Note: The TransLink fare structure is based on a zone system. Municipalities are located in one of three transit zones, and fares are calculated based on the number of zones travelled.)	Year (Note: This column refers to the year the station opened. It does not include dates for future lines, renovations, or platform additions, which can be found in the articles for the individual stations.)	Boardings (Note: Total boardings for 2025)	Connection(s)
22nd Street	Expo	New Westminster	Zone 2	1985	3,205,000	
29th Avenue	Expo	Vancouver	Zone 1	1985	2,238,000	
Aberdeen	Canada	Richmond	Zone 2	2009	1,223,000	
Braid	Expo	New Westminster	Zone 2	2002	1,364,000	
Brentwood Town Centre	Millennium	Burnaby	Zone 2	2002	2,346,000	R2 Marine–Willingdon
Bridgeport*	Canada	Richmond	Zone 2	2009	3,173,000	
Broadway–City Hall	Canada	Vancouver	Zone 1	2009	3,559,000	99 B-Line
Burquitlam	Millennium	Coquitlam	Zone 3	2016	1,622,000	
Burrard	Expo	Vancouver	Zone 1	1985	6,072,000	R5 Hastings St
Capstan	Canada	Richmond	Zone 2	2024	589,000	
Columbia*	Expo	New Westminster	Zone 2	1989	1,392,000	
Commercial–Broadway* (Note: Commercial–Broadway station was originally two separate stations—Broadway station and Commercial Drive station. Broadway station was completed in 1985, while Commercial Drive station was completed in 2002; the stations were merged in 2009.)	Expo; Millennium	Vancouver	Zone 1	1985	6,445,000	99 B-Line
Coquitlam Central	Millennium	Coquitlam	Zone 3	2016	1,595,000	West Coast Express; R3 Lougheed Hwy
Edmonds	Expo	Burnaby	Zone 2	1985	3,408,000	
Gateway	Expo	Surrey	Zone 3	1994	2,203,000	
Gilmore	Millennium	Burnaby	Zone 2	2002	1,143,000	
Granville	Expo	Vancouver	Zone 1	1985	5,861,000	
Holdom	Millennium	Burnaby	Zone 2	2002	847,000	
Inlet Centre	Millennium	Port Moody	Zone 3	2016	637,000	
Joyce–Collingwood (Note: Joyce–Collingwood station was formerly known as Joyce station.)	Expo	Vancouver	Zone 1	1985	4,994,000	R4 41st Ave
King Edward	Canada	Vancouver	Zone 1	2009	2,155,000	
King George†	Expo	Surrey	Zone 3	1994	4,789,000	R1 King George Blvd
Lafarge Lake–Douglas†	Millennium	Coquitlam	Zone 3	2016	754,000	
Lake City Way	Millennium	Burnaby	Zone 2	2003	261,000	
Langara–49th Avenue	Canada	Vancouver	Zone 1	2009	2,497,000	
Lansdowne	Canada	Richmond	Zone 2	2009	1,567,000	
Lincoln	Millennium	Coquitlam	Zone 3	2016	1,245,000	
Lougheed Town Centre*	Expo; Millennium	Burnaby	Zone 2	2002	3,717,000	
Main Street–Science World (Note: Main Street–Science World station was formerly known as Main Street station.)	Expo	Vancouver	Zone 1	1985	3,620,000	Pacific Central
Marine Drive	Canada	Vancouver	Zone 1	2009	3,331,000	
Metrotown	Expo	Burnaby	Zone 2	1985	8,228,000	R2 Marine–Willingdon
Moody Centre	Millennium	Port Moody	Zone 3	2016	792,000	West Coast Express
Nanaimo	Expo	Vancouver	Zone 1	1985	2,181,000	
New Westminster	Expo	New Westminster	Zone 2	1985	4,584,000	
Oakridge–41st Avenue	Canada	Vancouver	Zone 1	2009	2,227,000	R4 41st Ave
Olympic Village	Canada	Vancouver	Zone 1	2009	1,328,000	
Patterson	Expo	Burnaby	Zone 2	1985	1,419,000	
Production Way–University**	Expo; Millennium	Burnaby	Zone 2	2002	1,374,000	
Renfrew	Millennium	Vancouver	Zone 1	2002	1,147,000	
Richmond–Brighouse†	Canada	Richmond	Zone 2	2009	3,627,000	
Royal Oak	Expo	Burnaby	Zone 2	1985	1,773,000	
Rupert	Millennium	Vancouver	Zone 1	2002	791,000	
Sapperton	Expo	New Westminster	Zone 2	2002	979,000	
Scott Road	Expo	Surrey	Zone 3	1990	3,841,000	R6 Scott Rd
Sea Island Centre	Canada	Richmond / YVR	Zone 2 (Note: The Canada Line YVR AddFare applies to stored-value trips, single-use fares, and DayPasses purchased at Sea Island stations (YVR–Airport, Sea Island Centre, and Templeton), destined for Bridgeport station or beyond.)	2009	346,000	
Sperling–Burnaby Lake	Millennium	Burnaby	Zone 2	2002	574,000	
Stadium–Chinatown (Note: Stadium–Chinatown station was formerly known as Stadium station.)	Expo	Vancouver	Zone 1	1985	4,803,000	
Surrey Central	Expo	Surrey	Zone 3	1994	5,086,000	R1 King George Blvd
Templeton	Canada	Richmond / YVR	Zone 2	2009	1,284,000	
Vancouver City Centre	Canada	Vancouver	Zone 1	2009	4,941,000	
VCC–Clark†	Millennium	Vancouver	Zone 1	2006	880,000	
Waterfront**	Expo; Canada	Vancouver	Zone 1	1985	10,684,000	SeaBus; West Coast Express; R5 Hastings St
Yaletown–Roundhouse	Canada	Vancouver	Zone 1	2009	3,024,000	
YVR–Airport†	Canada	Richmond / YVR	Zone 2	2009	3,023,000	Vancouver International Airport

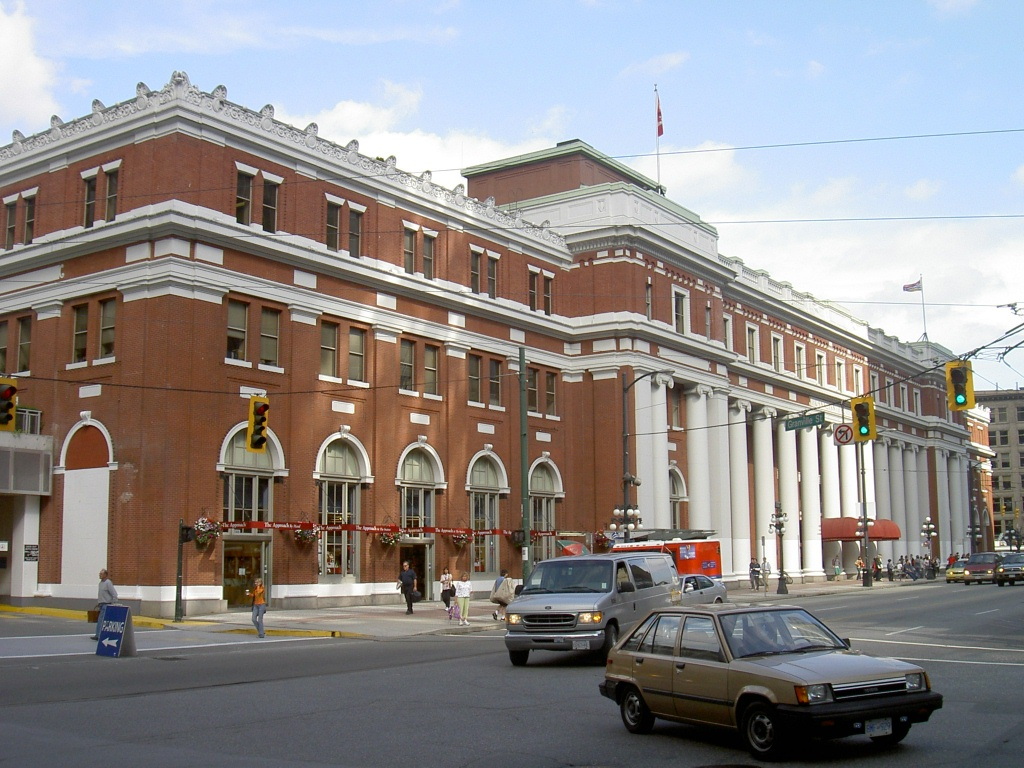
Waterfront station is the terminus for both the Expo and Canada lines and is linked to the SeaBus and the West Coast Express.

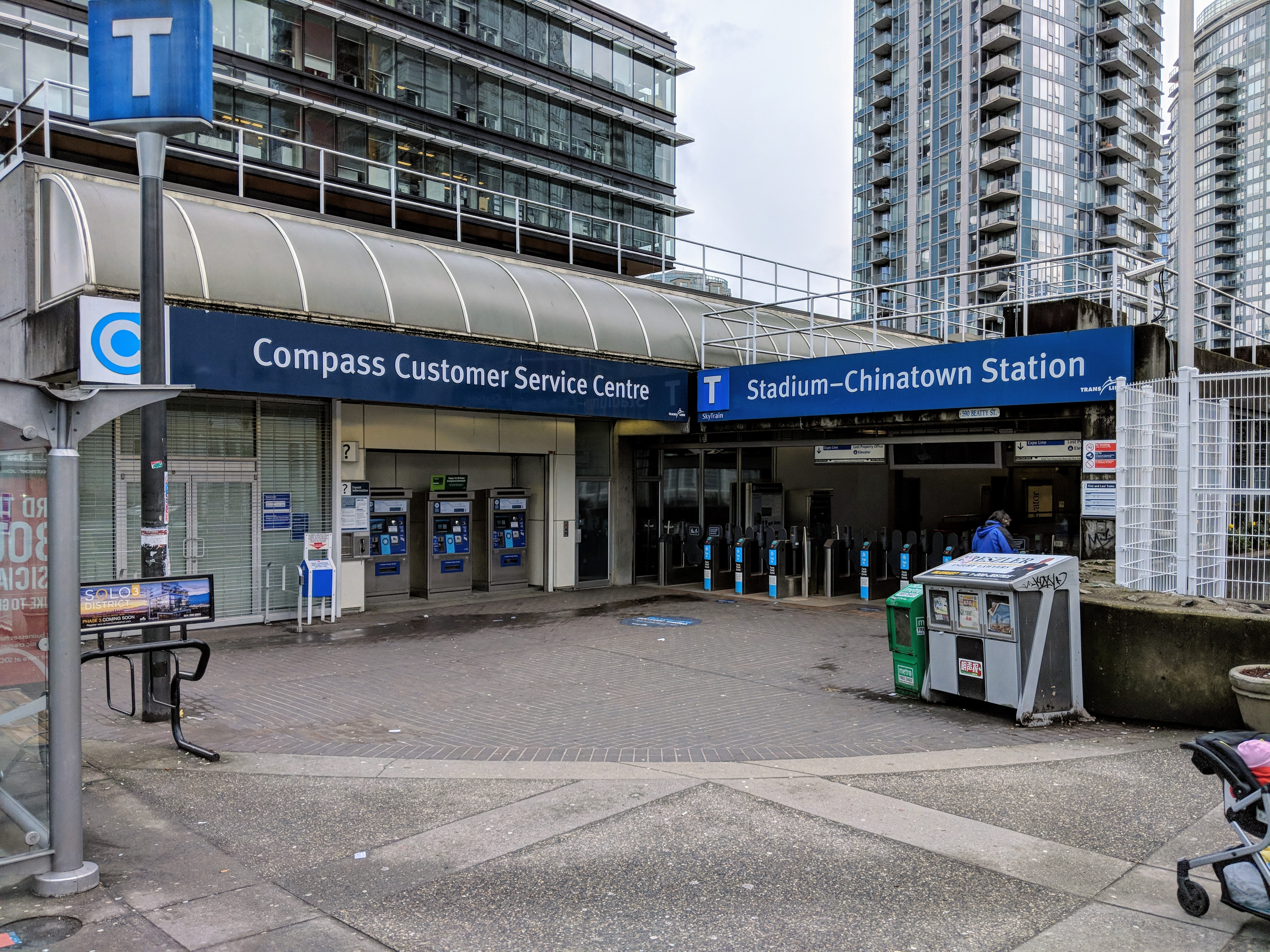
Stadium–Chinatown station is adjacent to Rogers Arena, and is one block away from BC Place Stadium and Chinatown.

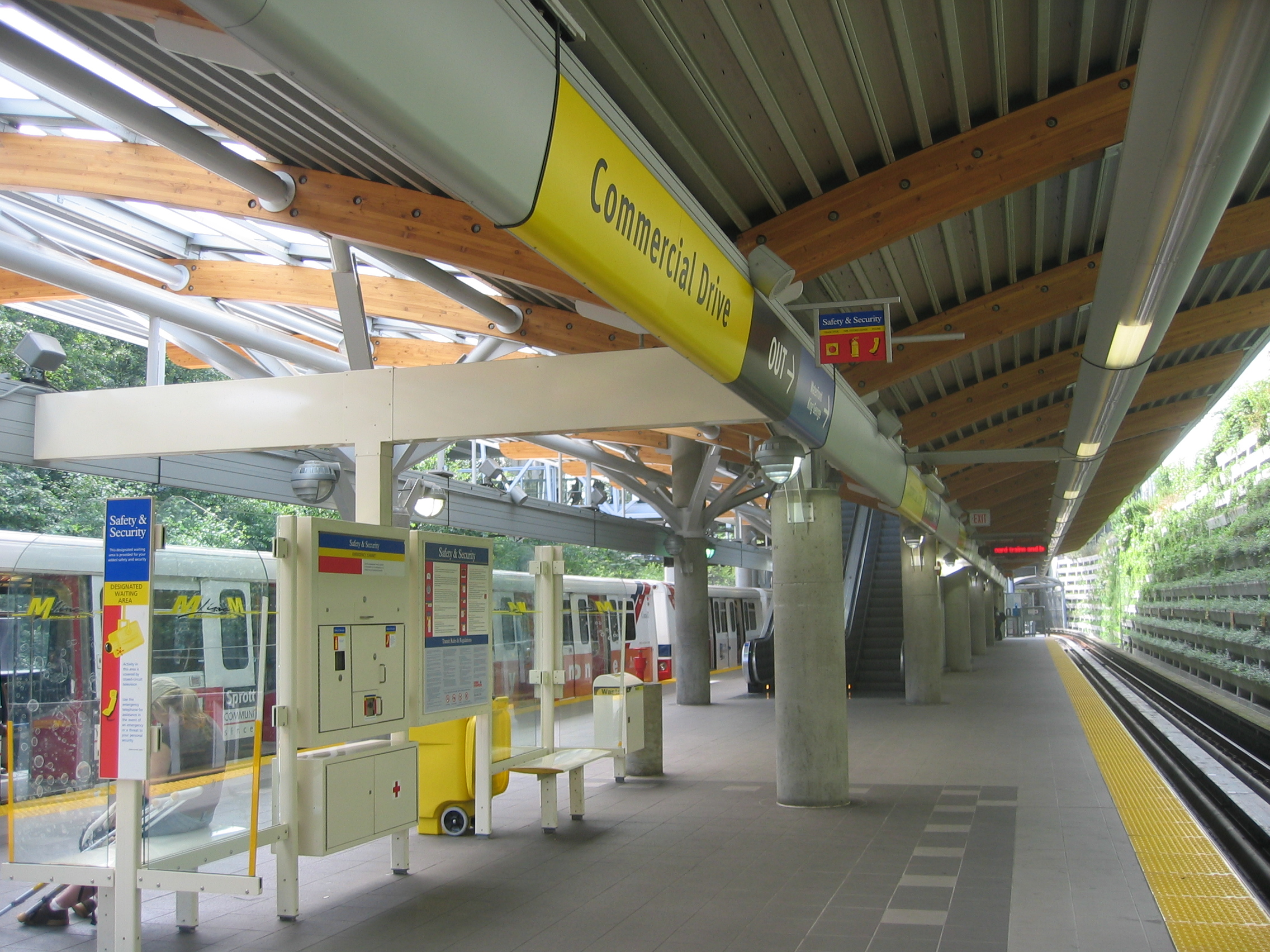
Commercial–Broadway station Platforms 1 and 2

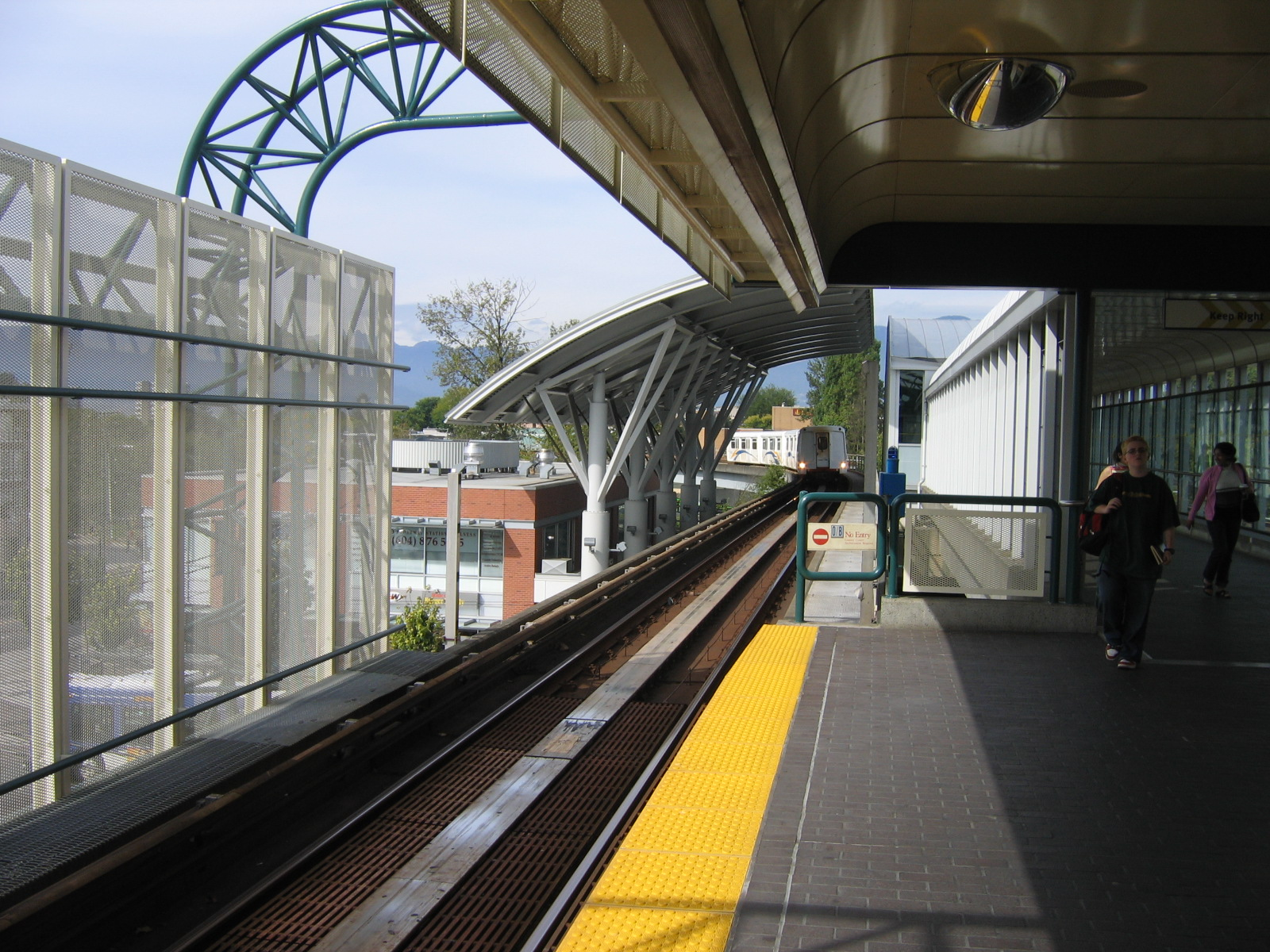
Commercial–Broadway station Platform 4

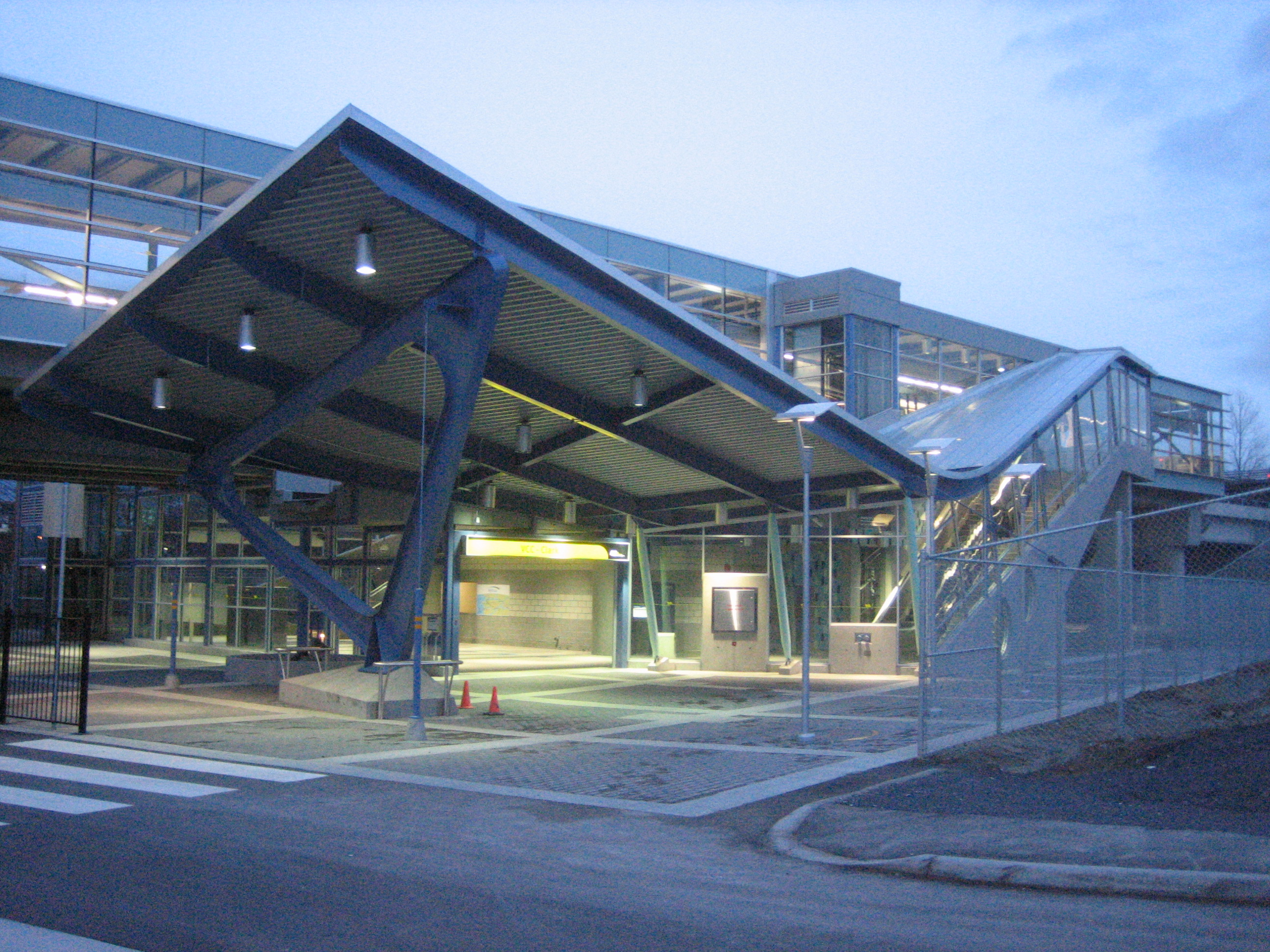
VCC–Clark station is two blocks away from the Broadway campus of Vancouver Community College (VCC) and is also the westbound terminus of the Millennium Line.

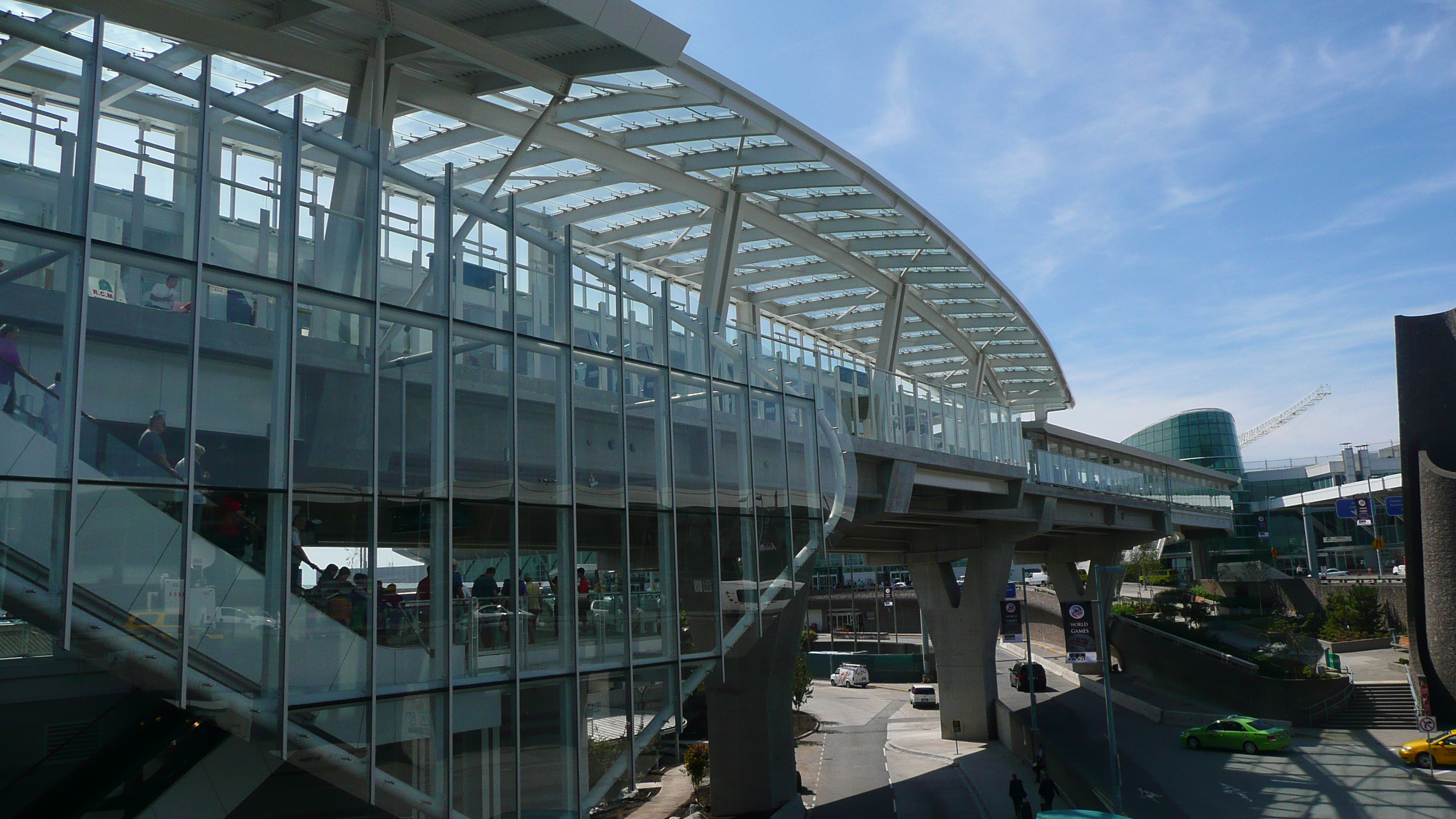
YVR–Airport station's platform and west portal; the station is the terminus of the Canada Line's airport branch.

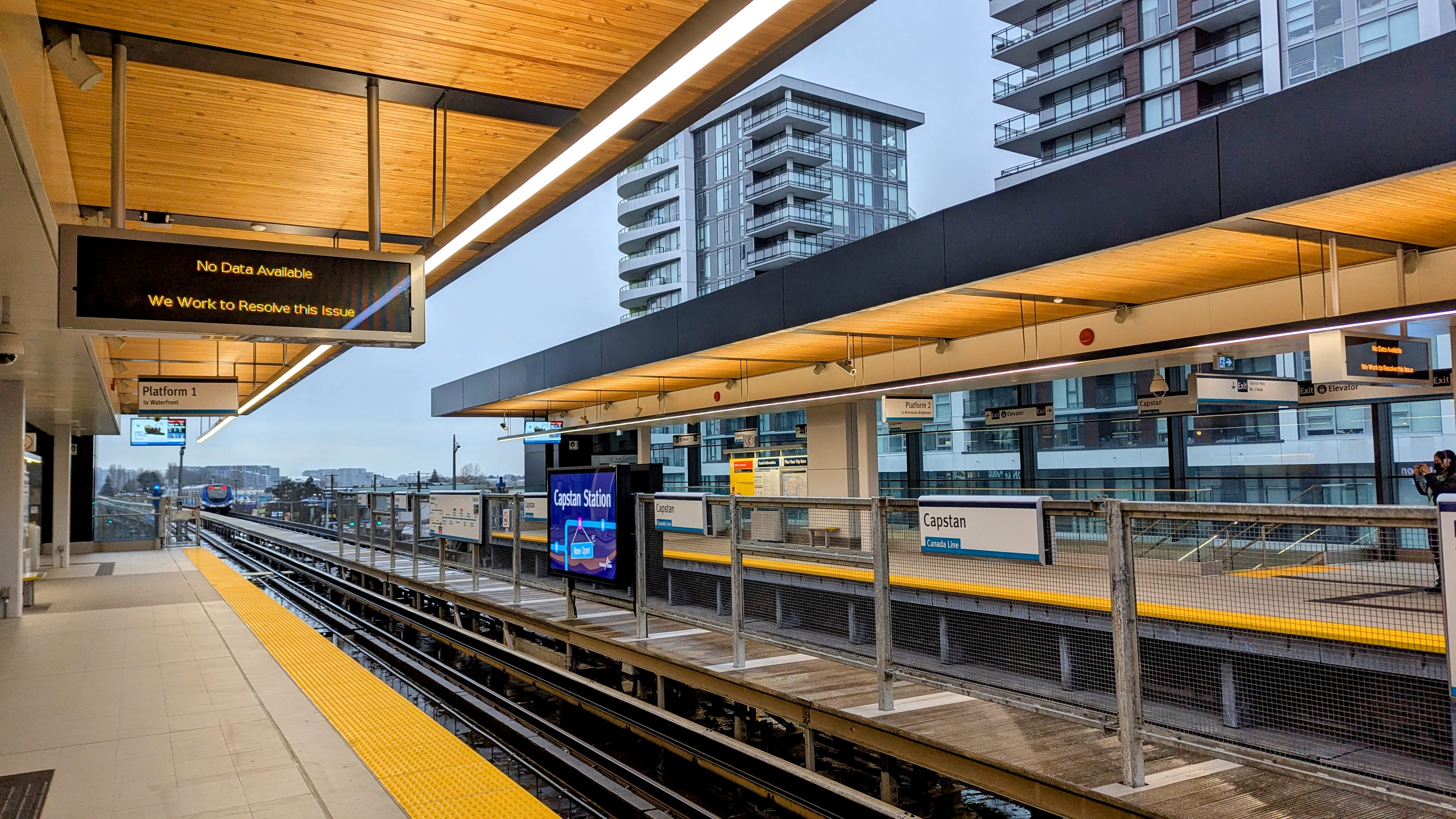
Capstan station on platform 1; this is the most recent station built and is the second infill station on the network.

== Future stations ==
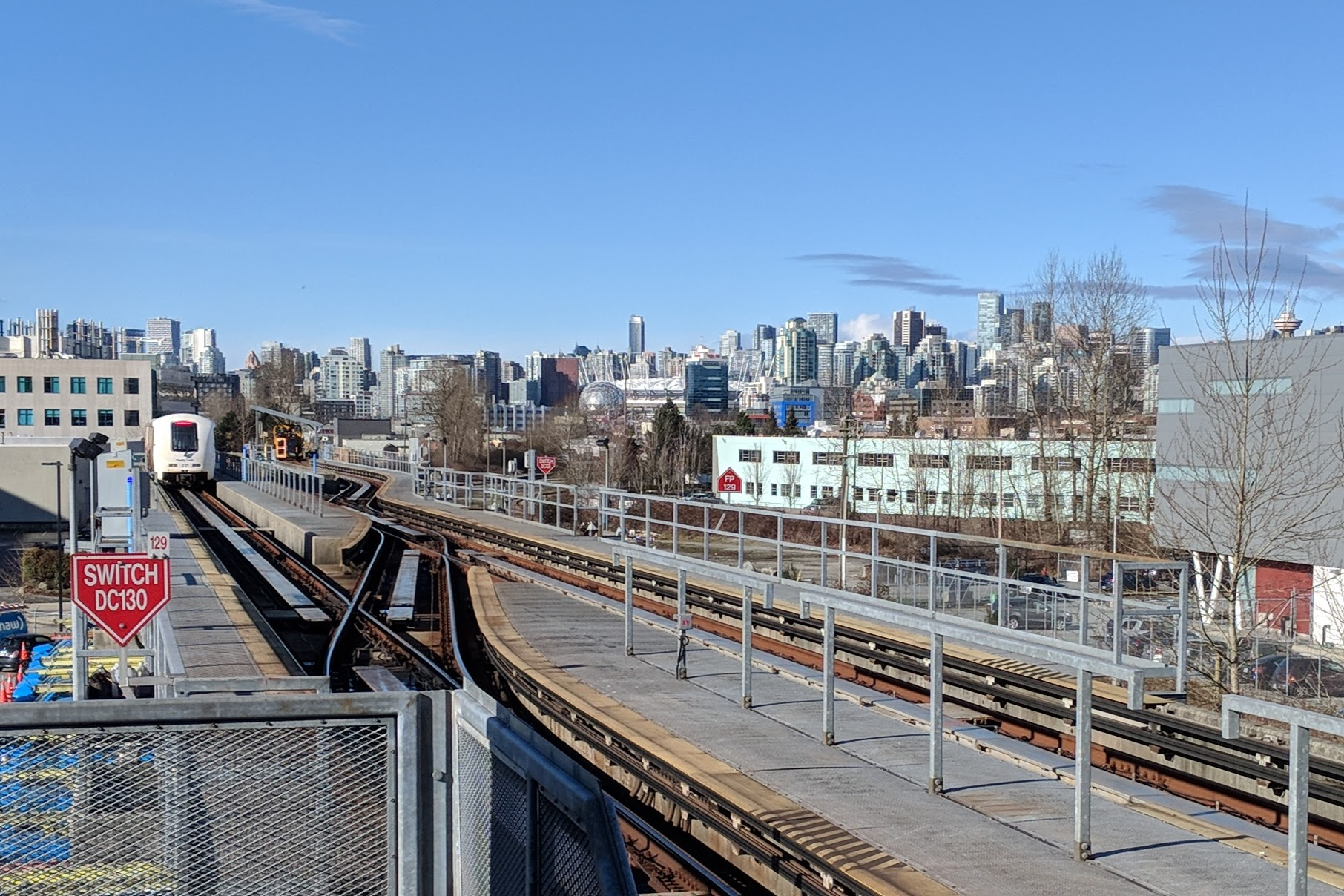
Tail tracks at VCC–Clark station. The Broadway Subway Project is a planned extension of the Millennium Line to be built west of this station to Arbutus Street.

Station	Line(s)	Municipality	Zone	Projected completion
Arbutus†	Millennium	Vancouver	Zone 1	2027
Great Northern Way–Emily Carr	Millennium	Vancouver	Zone 1	2027
Mount Pleasant	Millennium	Vancouver	Zone 1	2027
Oak–VGH	Millennium	Vancouver	Zone 1	2027
South Granville	Millennium	Vancouver	Zone 1	2027
152 Street	Expo	Surrey	Zone 3	2029
Bakerview–166 Street	Expo	Surrey	Zone 3	2029
Clayton	Expo	Surrey	Zone 3	2029
Fleetwood	Expo	Surrey	Zone 3	2029
Green Timbers	Expo	Surrey	Zone 3	2029
Hillcrest–184 Street	Expo	Surrey	Zone 3	2029
Langley City Centre†	Expo	Langley City	Zone 3	2029
Willowbrook	Expo	Langley Township	Zone 3	2029
