= Green Timbers =

Green Timbers may refer to:

== Canada ==
- Green Timbers station, a future rapid transit station in Surrey, British Columbia, Canada
- Green Timbers Elementary, a primary school in Surrey, British Columbia, Canada
- Green Timbers Urban Forest Park, an urban park in Surrey, British Columbia, Canada
- Surrey-Green Timbers, a former provincial electoral district in Surrey, British Columbia, Canada

== United States ==
- Green Timbers, Michigan, an unincorporated community in Corwith Township, Michigan, United States
