= Bakerview–166 Street station =

Metro Vancouver SkyTrain station

Bakerview–166 Street
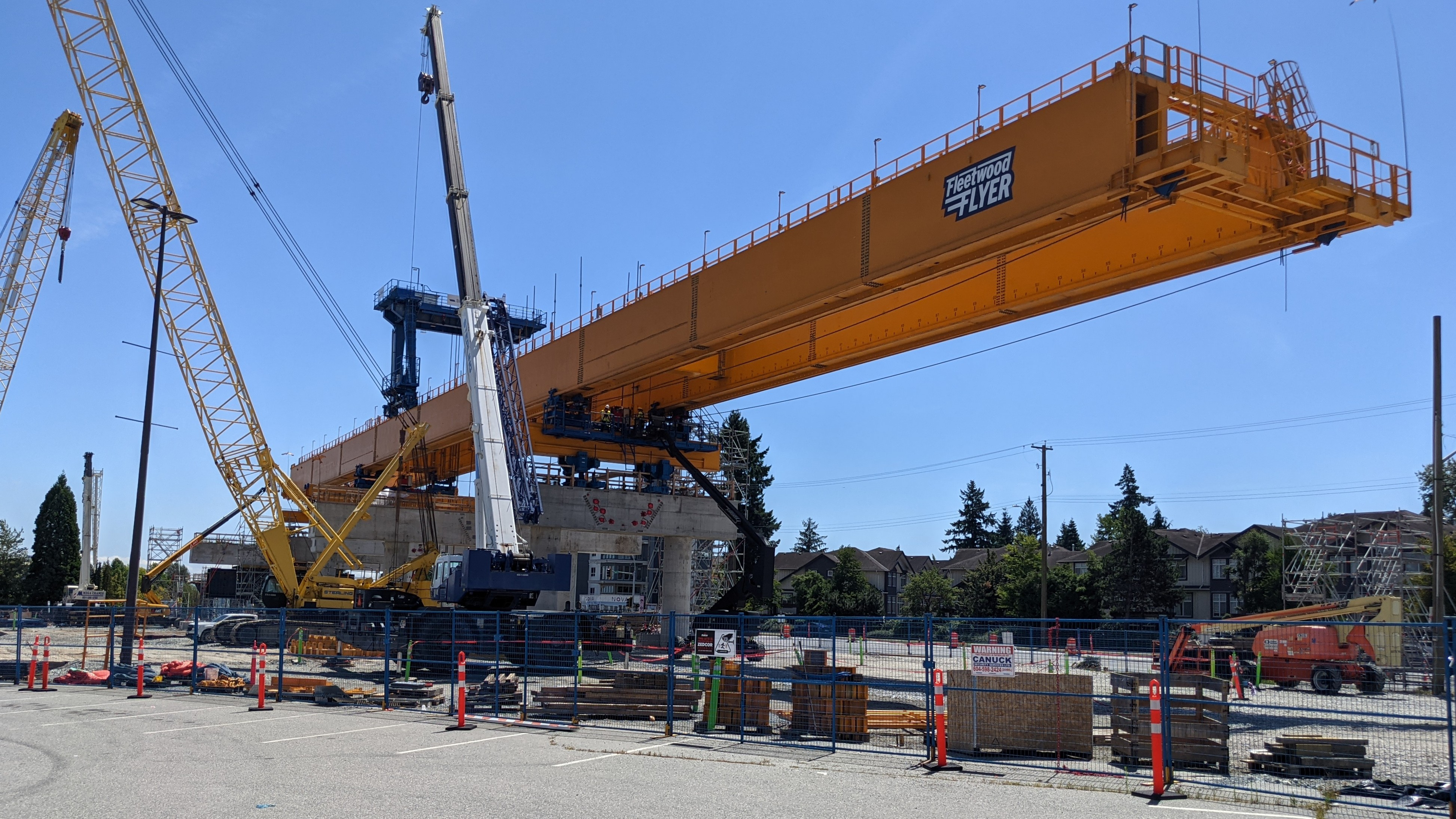
- Fleetwood Flyer launching gantry resting on the support columns of Bakerview–166 Street station in July 2025

General information
- Location: Surrey
- Coordinates: 49°09′04″N 122°45′44″W
- System: SkyTrain station
- Owner: TransLink
- Platforms: Side platforms
- Tracks: 2

Construction
- Structure type: Elevated
- Accessible: Yes

Other information
- Status: Under construction
- Fare zone: 3

History
- Opening: 2029 (3 years' time)

Services
Preceding station	TransLink	Following station
Fleetwood towards Waterfront	Expo Line Langley extension (opens 2029)	Hillcrest–184 Street towards Langley City Centre
Location

Bakerview–166 Street is an elevated station under construction on the Expo Line of Metro Vancouver's SkyTrain rapid transit system. It will be located at the northwest corner of the intersection of Fraser Highway and 166 Street in the Fleetwood town centre of Surrey, British Columbia, Canada. It is scheduled to open in 2029.

The station is named after the view of Mount Baker from the neighbourhood, and will be adjacent to Bonnie Schrenk Park and the Surrey Sport and Leisure Complex. Bakerview–166 Street station is the starting point for the Fleetwood Flyer launching gantry, which will construct the elevated guideway for the Surrey–Langley extension towards 152 Street station.
