= Willowbrook station =

Willowbrook station may refer to:

- Willowbrook station (SkyTrain), a future rapid transit station in Langley Township, British Columbia, Canada
- Willowbrook/Rosa Parks station, a light rail station in Willowbrook, California, United States

== Other uses ==
- Willowbrook (disambiguation)
