= Expo Line (SkyTrain) =

Rapid transit line in Metro Vancouver, Canada

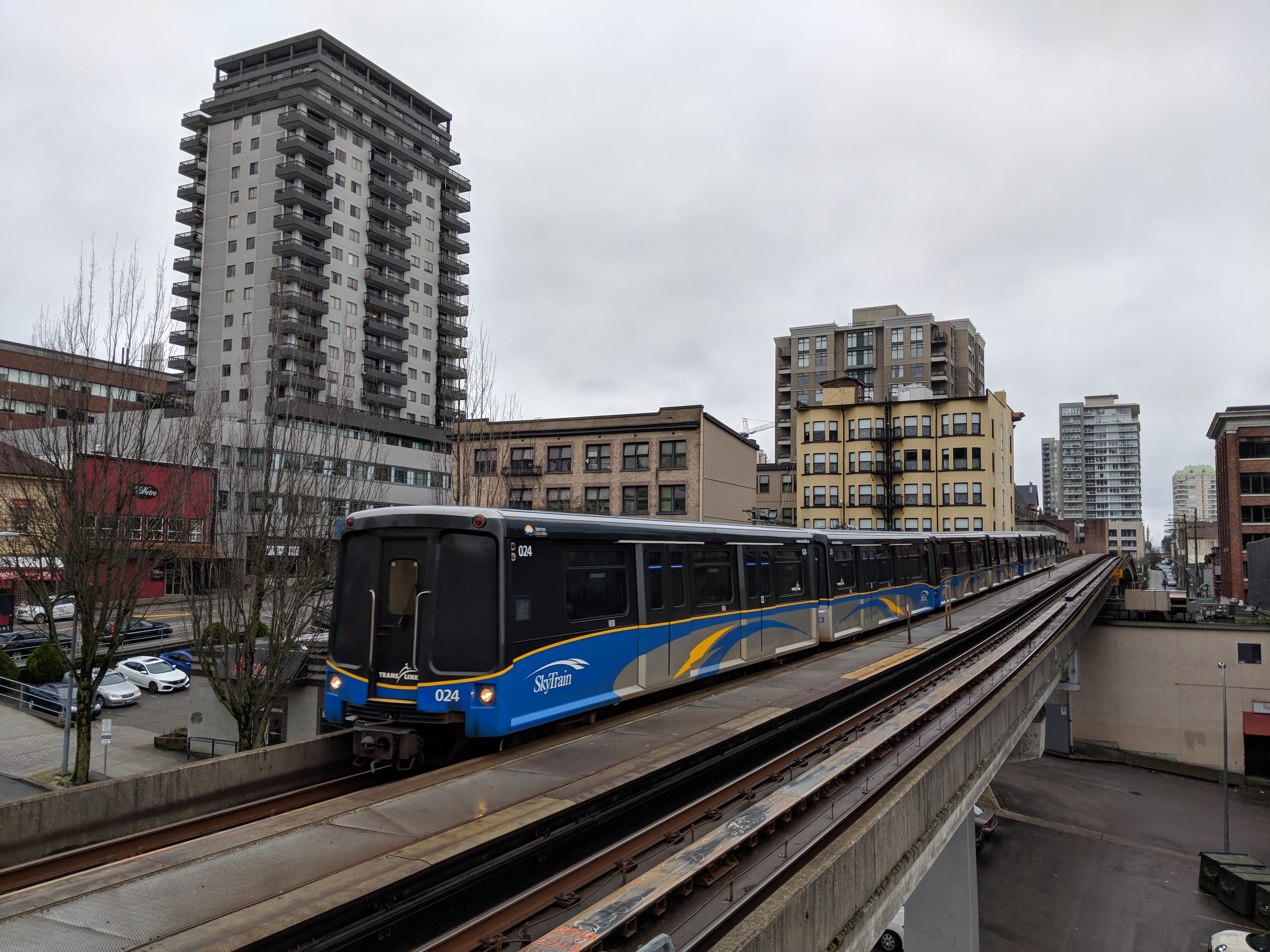
- An Expo Line train in New Westminster

Overview
- Owner: TransLink (South Coast British Columbia Transportation Authority)
- Locale: Metro Vancouver, British Columbia
- Termini: Waterfront; King George; Production Way–University
- Stations: 24 (8 under construction)

Service
- Type: Rapid transit
- System: SkyTrain
- Operator: British Columbia Rapid Transit Company
- Rolling stock: ICTS Mark I, 6 cars per trainset; ART Mark II/III, 4 cars per trainset; Alstom Mark V, 5 cars per trainset
- Daily ridership: 311,000 (2023) (Note: Combined with Millennium Line)

History
- Opened: December 11, 1985; 40 years ago
- Last extension: 2002

Technical
- Line length: 36.4 km (22.6 mi)
- Num of tracks: 2
- Track gauge: 1,435 mm (4 ft 8 1/2 in)
- Electrification: Third rail (linear motor)
- Operating speed: 80 km/h (50 mph)
Route map
Expo Line highlighted in navy

The Expo Line is the oldest line of the SkyTrain rapid transit system in the Metro Vancouver region of British Columbia, Canada. The line is owned and operated by BC Rapid Transit Company, a subsidiary of TransLink, and links the cities of Vancouver, Burnaby, New Westminster and Surrey.

The line was originally known only as "the SkyTrain" from its inception in 1985 until 2002, as it was the system's only line during this time. In 2002, after the opening of the system's second line, the Millennium Line, the original line was given the name "Expo Line". The new name was in recognition of Expo 86, the world's fair that Vancouver hosted in 1986, as the transit system had been built in large part as a showcase and an attraction for that fair.

== Route ==
The line is elevated from Stadium–Chinatown to New Westminster stations, except for short at-grade sections between Nanaimo and Joyce–Collingwood stations in East Vancouver, and around the SkyTrain yards at Edmonds station in Burnaby.

The line travels underground for a short stretch between New Westminster and Columbia stations. Just east of Columbia is a junction, one branch of which crosses the Fraser River, via the SkyBridge, and is elevated for the rest of its run through Surrey, with King George as its terminus station. The other branch continues through New Westminster, first through a tunnel and then elevated until it terminates at Production Way–University in Burnaby.

From just west of Nanaimo station all the way to New Westminster station, the Expo Line follows the BC Electric Railway's former Central Park Line, which carried interurbans between Vancouver and New Westminster from 1890 to the early 1950s.

== History ==
=== ICTS demonstration project (1983) ===
What is now known as SkyTrain began as a demonstration project to showcase the newly developed linear induction motor propulsion technology to Vancouver and other prospective cities throughout the world. Although Toronto's Scarborough RT was completed before the Expo Line in 1985, the Intermediate Capacity Transit System (ICTS) demonstration was the first system to use SkyTrain technology. The ICTS demonstration was built using the Advanced Rapid Transit (ART) technology developed by the Urban Transportation Development Corporation (now part of Bombardier). Construction began on March 1, 1982, and was completed in early 1983. The demonstration project consisted of just one station and about one kilometre of guideway with no switches. This original station was not named during this time as it was the only station, but then in 1985 opened as Main Street station.

As it was a showcase station, Main Street had a different initial design from other stations on the Expo Line that came after it. For example, glass was featured in the station's design, but was missing from other original Expo Line stations except Stadium station (now Stadium–Chinatown), since it was tied to the Expo grounds. Having preceded other stations on the line by three years, Main Street–Science World was visibly older, and signs of rust and wear were showing before extensive renovations to the station were completed in 2014.

The guideway for the showcase line was a straight section east of the station running over Terminal Avenue. It ended across from where the former Brussels Chocolate factory once was, located on Terminal. There was no guideway west of the station as the track ended immediately at the west end of the platform, where the Vancity head office now stands.

The ICTS guideway was built differently from the rest of the Expo Line. The columns were different, especially with how they were joined with the guideway. The walkway between the two tracks is of a different but also inferior design from rest of the Expo Line, and it is showing signs of rust that come with the older age of the guideway.

There was only a single two-car train running on the north westbound track. After passengers boarded, it ran east toward the end of the test guideway. At the eastern end, the train would stop and, after a pause, reverse directions and return to the station. Since there were no switches, only the northern track was used and the train would run back and forth on the same track. There was also a single-car mock-up parked on the south platform, what is now the eastbound platform. This car was not operational. The two-car train and single-car mock-up were of a unique design, different to all the production Mark I trains. The red tail lights were located on the bottom beside the headlights, instead of at the top. The end door and window were of a different design. As well, there were black panels on either side of the door that are not found in the production trains. The whereabouts of these trains is unknown.

The ICTS guideway was retrofitted during the construction of the Millennium Line to accommodate the heavier Mark II cars. This was done by adding additional steel-reinforced concrete beams to the columns where they support the guideway. These are clearly visible when driving or walking on Terminal Avenue under the guideway. With the exception of the original ICTS guideway, no other part of the Expo Line required retrofitting for strength in order to accommodate the Mark II cars.

After the 1983 preview closed, the single pair of demonstration cars were sent back to Ontario, which afterwards served as test trains for the UTDC. The subsequent trains ordered for Expo were designed slightly differently from the demo train set because of issues such as a lack of standardized parts, and the wish to introduce automated computer technology to drive the trains.

=== Phase I: Waterfront to New Westminster (1985) ===
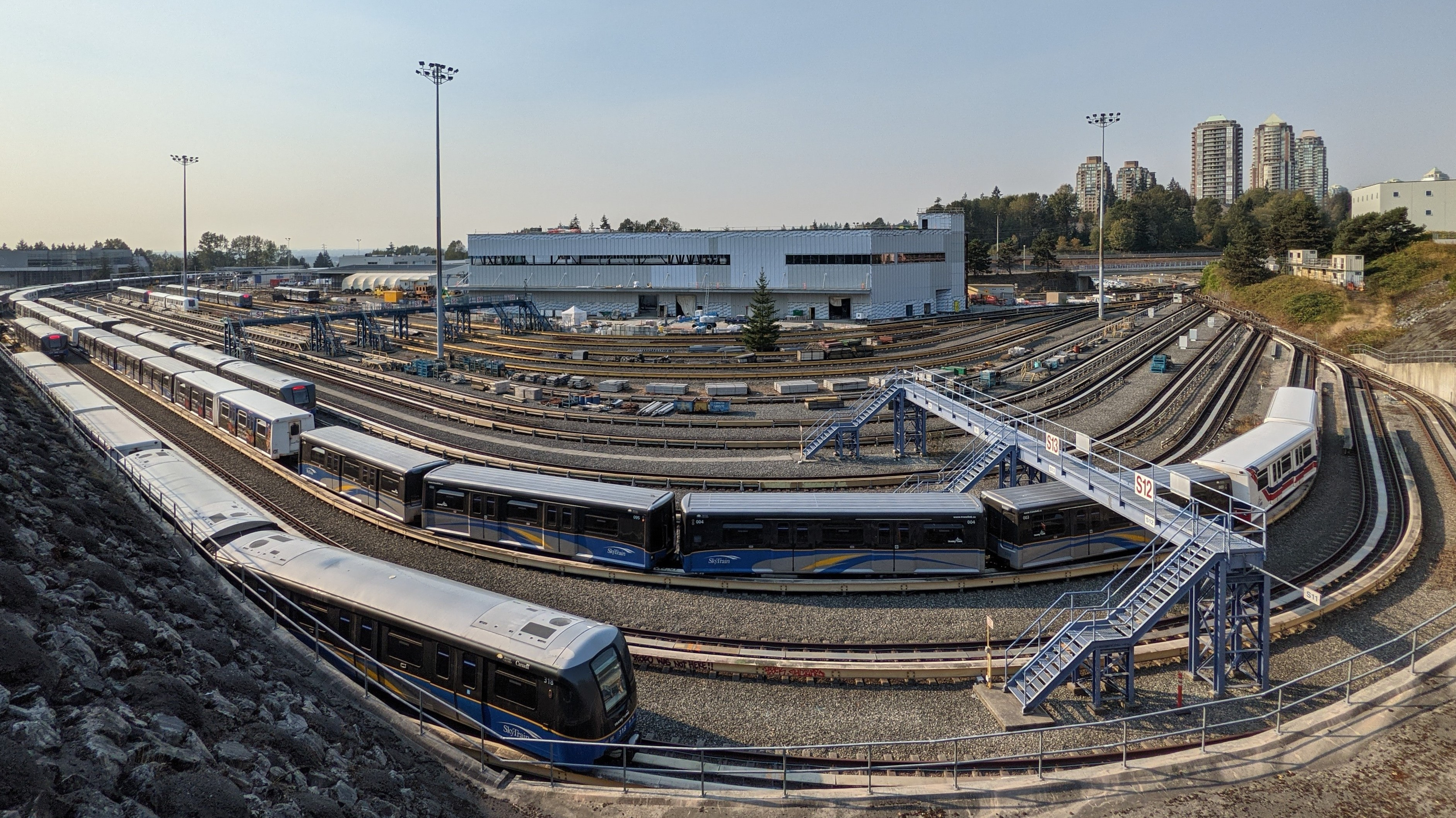
Operations and Maintenance Centre 1, located east of Edmonds station in Burnaby

Following the demonstration project, construction of the first phase of the Expo Line between Vancouver and New Westminster got under way in mid-1983, with guideway construction nearing completion by late 1984, and station construction beginning in early 1985. On December 11, 1985, SkyTrain began providing free weekend service, with full revenue service opening on January 3, 1986. Phase I was 21.4 kilometres (13.3 mi) in length, starting at Waterfront station and terminating at New Westminster station. The newly built system had limited Sunday service until 1990, and shorter revenue hours during weekdays than SkyTrain's current revenue schedule as of 2010.

During Expo 86, special shuttle trains ran from a third track at Stadium station, where there was a connection to the monorail serving the main site of the world's fair, to the Canadian pavilion at Waterfront station. Waterfront station was divided in two, with a fence going down the centre of the platform.

For the first few years of revenue service until the early 1990s, all trains were lined with carpeting, and train doors did not open automatically but rather at the push of buttons on the interior and exterior of the trains when in stations. This on-demand system reflected the small-scale ridership SkyTrain had before Vancouver experienced a major population boost.

=== Phase II: Columbia and Scott Road stations (1989–1990) ===
The first extension, or Phase II, was split into two parts. Construction began in 1987, with Columbia station opening on February 14, 1989, adding 600 metres (2,000 ft) of guideway in New Westminster. The second segment opened on March 16, 1990, and included Scott Road station in Surrey, crossing the Fraser River via the purpose-built, cable-stayed SkyBridge, adding 2.5 kilometres (1.6 mi) to the line.

=== Phase III: Surrey City Centre extension (1994) ===
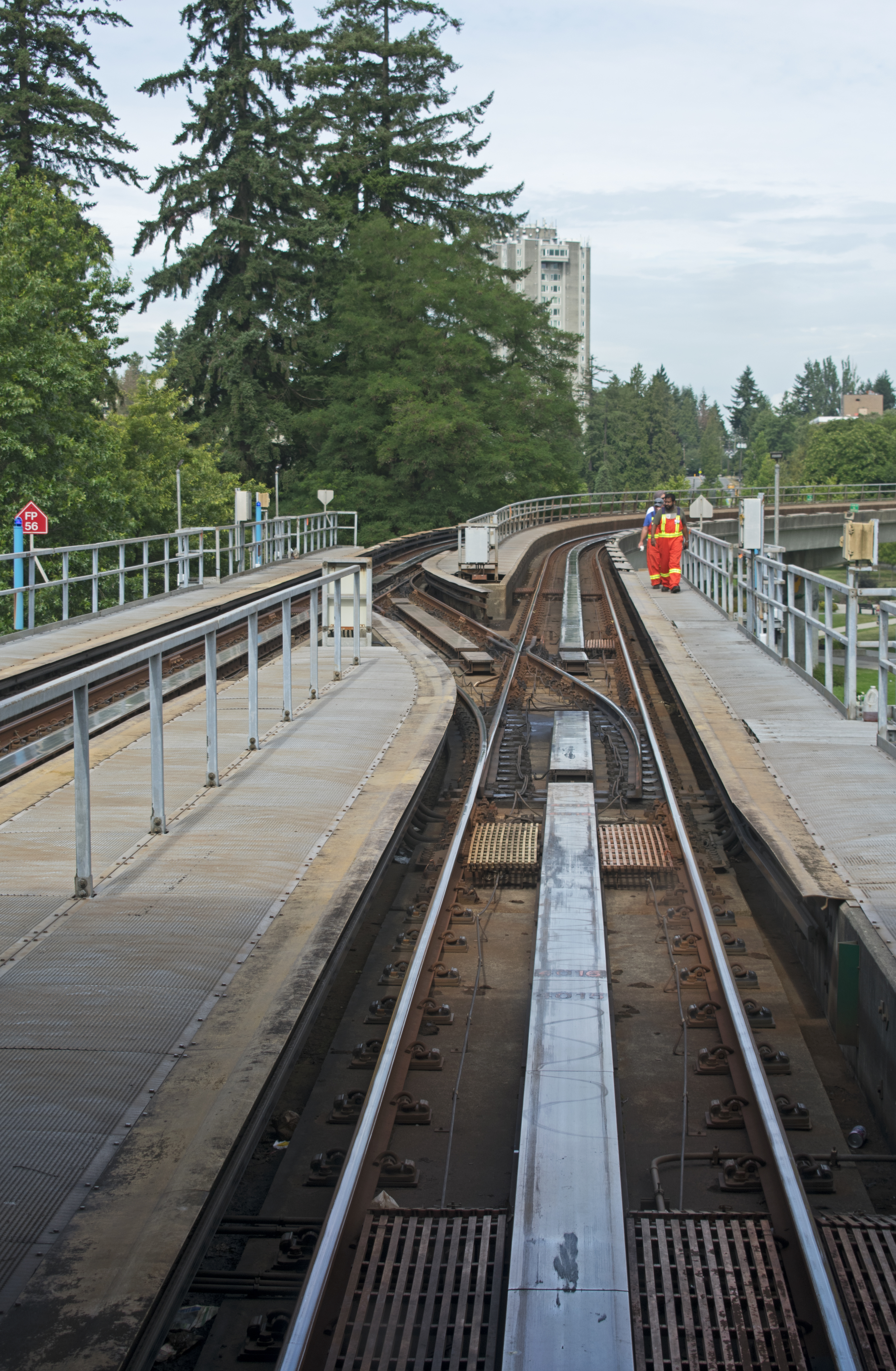
Crossover west of King George station

Construction of a 4-kilometre (2.5 mi) second extension, or Phase III, began in late 1991 and opened on March 28, 1994, adding three stations in Surrey's City Centre district in Whalley. Private partnerships with surrounding businesses in the community led to the then-new stations having a different appearance from the rest of the Expo Line. This extension set one of the Expo Line's current eastern terminus at King George station. It also added Gateway and Surrey Central stations.

=== Branch to Production Way–University (2016) ===
In 2002, the Millennium Line opened and shared the same track alignment with the Expo Line from Waterfront station in Downtown Vancouver to Columbia station in New Westminster. At Columbia, the two lines diverged, with the Expo Line crossing the Fraser River towards Surrey City Centre and the Millennium Line entering a short tunnel towards northeastern New Westminster and North Burnaby.

In late 2016, the SkyTrain system underwent a service change in preparation for the opening of the Evergreen Extension, resulting in a new branch of the Expo Line serving four stations that were originally built for the Millennium Line. On October 22, 2016, this branch began service from Columbia to Sapperton, Braid, Lougheed Town Centre, and Production Way–University stations, while the Millennium Line began running between VCC–Clark and Lougheed Town Centre (and later, Lafarge Lake–Douglas) stations, effectively ending nearly 15 years of Millennium Line service between Waterfront and Braid. The main Expo Line service between Waterfront and King George stations remained in place, operating at the same frequency levels.

== Technology ==
The Expo Line uses a fleet of Innovia ART and Innovia Metro trains built by Bombardier Transportation (now Alstom). Like the Millennium Line, the trains are powered by linear induction motors rather than the conventional electric (rotary) motors used on the Canada Line. Expo Line trains are operated by the same SelTrac automatic train control system used in the rest of the SkyTrain network.

The 2023 fleet consists of six-car Mark I trains using the Innovia ART 100, two- and four-car Mark II trains (operating in coupled pairs of two cars) using the Innovia ART 200, and four-car Mark III trains using the Innovia Metro 300. In July 2025, new five-car Mark V trains entered service.

== Expansions ==
=== Capacity upgrades ===
Before the purchase of some Mark II vehicles in 2009, the Expo line was operating at capacity while carrying 12,000 passengers per hour per direction (pphpd). Its ultimate design capacity was 19,400 pphpd using six-car Mark I trains operating at 93-second headways. However, exclusively operating a fleet of five-car trains would increase the capacity to 25,700 pphpd if Mark II trains were used.

Several options have been considered over the system's history to increase capacity on the Expo Line, including:

- Purchasing middle "C" cars to use with some of the Mark II trainsets to maximize available platform space. Current platforms can fit six-car Mark I trains and five-car Mark II/III trains. With its current fleet, TransLink can only create two-car and four-car Mark II trains (2 or 2+2). By adding a middle "C" car to some Mark II couplets to create three-car trainsets, longer five-car Mark II trains could have been used (2+3).
- Reducing SkyTrain operating headways to 75 seconds per train, down from the 108 seconds used in the early 2010s, which would have allowed for more trains to operate at peak times.
- After using longer trains and running trains at 75-second headways, the next option would be to lengthen the station platforms beyond 80 metres (260 ft) to accommodate even longer trains. This expansion option would be the most expensive as it would require heavy construction at all Expo Line stations.

In late 2020, TransLink ordered 41 Alstom Mark V trainsets in five-car configurations. These trains are based on the previous Mark III trains; however, each train will have an additional carriage and will have more internal space. Each five-car Mark V train will be able to hold 672 passengers regularly, both seated and standing, with a potential crush capacity of up to 1,207 passengers. The order will provide for both an increase in the number of trainsets and ultimately a total replacement of the mid-1980s to early 1990s Mark I rolling stock. Construction will be required at some stations to accommodate the 80-metre (260 ft) length of the Mark V trainsets, but no service interruptions will be necessary.

=== Surrey–Langley extension ===
The Surrey Langley SkyTrain Project is a 16-kilometre (9.9 mi) elevated extension of the Expo Line from King George SkyTrain Station in Surrey to 203 Street in Langley City, routed mostly along Fraser Highway. Construction began in November 2024 and was anticipated to be completed in 2029. The extension will be built in one phase (a change from earlier plans) and include the following eight stations:

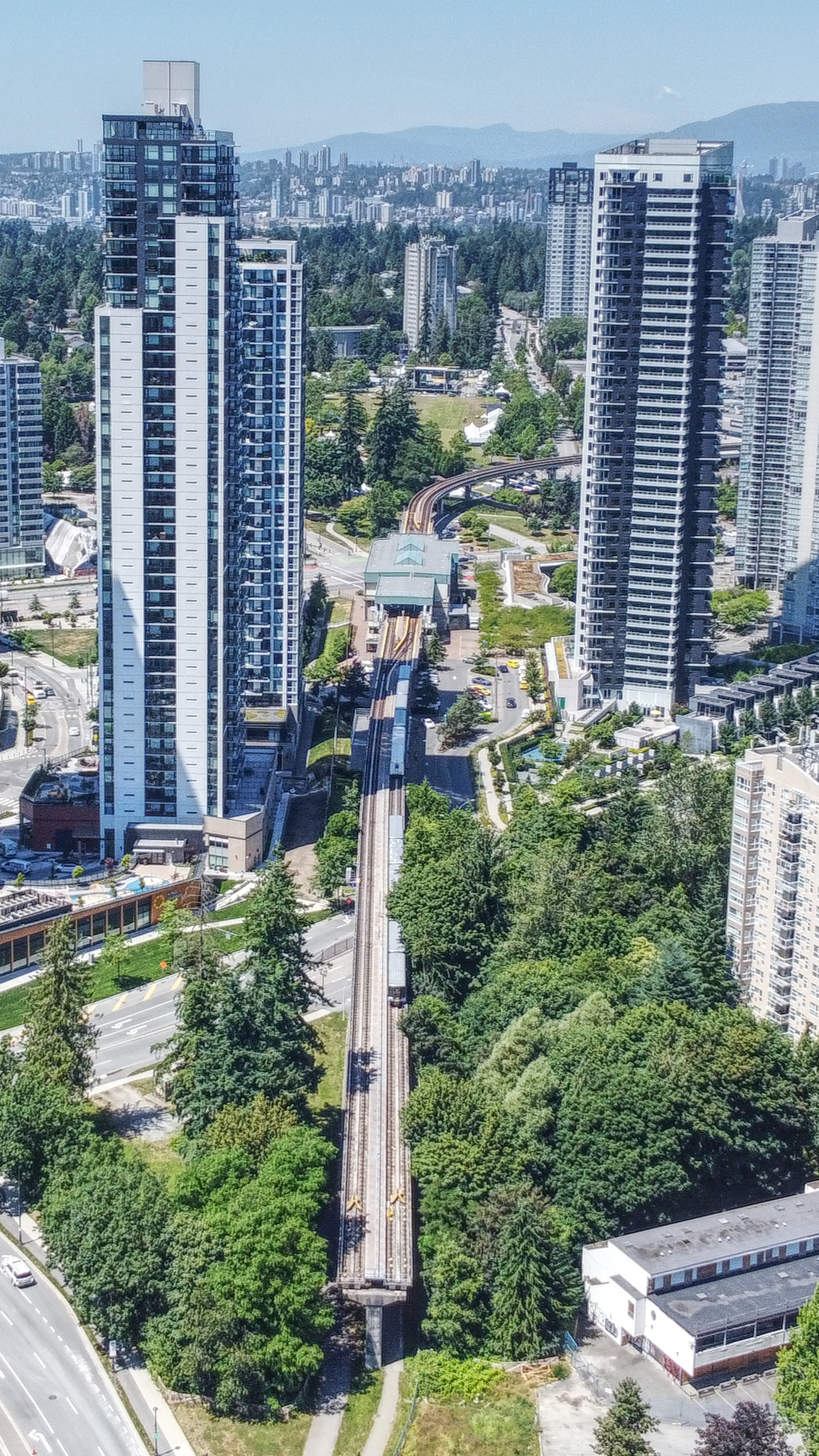
King George station has been an Expo Line terminus since 1994 and is the starting point of the Surrey–Langley extension.

Station	City	Location	Transit exchange
Green Timbers	Surrey	Fraser Highway at 140 Street	No
152 Street	Surrey	Fraser Highway at 152 Street	No
Fleetwood	Surrey	Fraser Highway at 160 Street	No
Bakerview–166 Street	Surrey	Fraser Highway at 166 Street	Yes
Hillcrest–184 Street	Surrey	Fraser Highway at 184 Street	No
Clayton	Surrey	Fraser Highway at 190 Street	No
Willowbrook	Langley Township	Fraser Highway at 196 Street	Yes
Langley City Centre	Langley City	Industrial Avenue at 203 Street	Yes

The 2008 Provincial Transit Plan included a 6-kilometre (3.7 mi) extension from King George station in Surrey east to Guildford, then along 152 Street to Fraser Highway and southeast to 168 Street; a further extension to Willowbrook Shopping Centre in Langley Township was also included in the plan. In 2011, as part of phase 2 of the Surrey Rapid Transit Study, different possibilities were examined for expanding rapid transit along multiple corridors in the South of Fraser region. In addition to SkyTrain, light rail and bus rapid transit were also in consideration. In 2016, TransLink was building dual business cases for LRT and SkyTrain technologies.

In November 2018, following a change of government in Surrey, the Metro Vancouver Mayors' Council voted to indefinitely suspend the at-grade Surrey light rail project in favour of extending the Expo Line from King George station to Langley City. This extension would be 16 kilometres (9.9 mi) long and add eight stations to the Expo Line. The $1.65 billion in funding that was earmarked for the light rail project was intended to be used to construct part of this extension to Langley but was insufficient to fund the entire extension, with $1.9 billion more needed to complete the project. The existing funding would extend the line 7 kilometres (4.3 mi) to Fleetwood in Surrey and add 4 new stations, terminating at 166th Street.

On July 25, 2019, the Mayors' Council voted to extend the Expo Line to Fleetwood using the existing funds. The council also voted to proceed with preparing a detailed business case for the full Surrey–Langley SkyTrain extension, which was expected to be completed by early 2020. If approved by the end of the third quarter of 2020, construction would have started in early 2022, with revenue service to Fleetwood projected to have started in late 2025.

On October 8, 2020, during the 2020 provincial election campaign, the BC NDP pledged to work with senior levels of government to obtain the $1.5 billion needed to complete the full extension to Langley.

On July 9, 2021, Prime Minister Justin Trudeau announced that the federal government would provide up to $1.3 billion to build the SkyTrain extension to Langley in a single phase. At that time, the cost of the project was estimated between $3.8 and $3.95 billion in total, more than $650 million in excess of the earlier $3.13 billion estimate from TransLink, with the rest of the funding being split between TransLink and the provincial government. The full extension to Langley was planned to be constructed as a single project, rather than in two phases, and open in 2028. In July 2022, the provincial government officially approved this one-phase plan. Procurement for contractors was slated to start later in 2022, with major construction expected to begin in 2024. On March 7, 2024, the provincial Ministry of Transportation announced that SkyLink Guideway Partners had been selected to build the elevated guideway for the extension. On August 15, 2024 the Ministry of Transportation stated that the extension was now expected to be completed in 2029, with an estimated cost of $6 billion.

== Stations ==
Station	Opened	City	Connections	Location
Waterfront	1985	Vancouver	SeaBus Canada Line West Coast Express R5 Hastings St	Cordova between Granville and Seymour
Burrard	1985	Vancouver	R5 Hastings St	Burrard between Melville and Dunsmuir
Granville	1985	Vancouver		Granville between Georgia and Dunsmuir; adjacent to Pacific Centre
Stadium–Chinatown	1985	Vancouver		Beatty at Dunsmuir; adjacent to Rogers Arena; near BC Place and Chinatown
Main Street–Science World	1985	Vancouver	Pacific Central	Main at Terminal; near Science World
Commercial–Broadway	1985/2002 (Note: Commercial–Broadway station was originally two separate stations—Broadway station and Commercial Drive station. Broadway station was completed in 1985, while Commercial Drive station was completed in 2002; the stations were merged in 2009.)	Vancouver	Millennium Line 99 B-Line	Commercial at Broadway
Nanaimo	1985	Vancouver		East 24th Avenue at Nanaimo
29th Avenue	1985	Vancouver		East 29th Avenue at Atlin
Joyce–Collingwood	1985	Vancouver	R4 41st Ave	Joyce at Vanness
Patterson	1985	Burnaby		Patterson between Beresford and Central
Metrotown	1985	Burnaby	R2 Marine Dr	Beresford and Central between Silver and Telford; adjacent to Metropolis at Metrotown
Royal Oak	1985	Burnaby		Beresford at Royal Oak
Edmonds	1985	Burnaby		18th Street near Griffiths
22nd Street	1985	New Westminster		22nd Street at 7th Avenue
New Westminster	1985	New Westminster		8th Street between Columbia and Carnarvon; integrated with Shops at New West
Columbia	1989	New Westminster		4th Street between Columbia and Carnarvon; branches split
King George branch
Scott Road	1990	Surrey	R6 Scott Rd	Scott Road near King George Boulevard
Gateway	1994	Surrey		108 Avenue at University Drive
Surrey Central	1994	Surrey	R1 King George Blvd	Central Avenue at City Parkway; adjacent to Central City
King George	1994	Surrey	R1 King George Blvd	King George Boulevard at Holland Commons; adjacent to King George Hub
Production Way–University branch
Sapperton	2002	New Westminster		Brunette at Spruce; adjacent to Royal Columbian Hospital
Braid	2002	New Westminster		Brunette at Braid; near Highway 1
Lougheed Town Centre	2002	Burnaby	Millennium Line	Lougheed Highway at Austin; adjacent to the City of Lougheed shopping centre
Production Way–University	2002	Burnaby	SFU	Lougheed Highway at Production Way

== See also ==
- SkyTrain (Vancouver) rolling stock
