= Fleetwood station (SkyTrain) =

Metro Vancouver SkyTrain station

Fleetwood
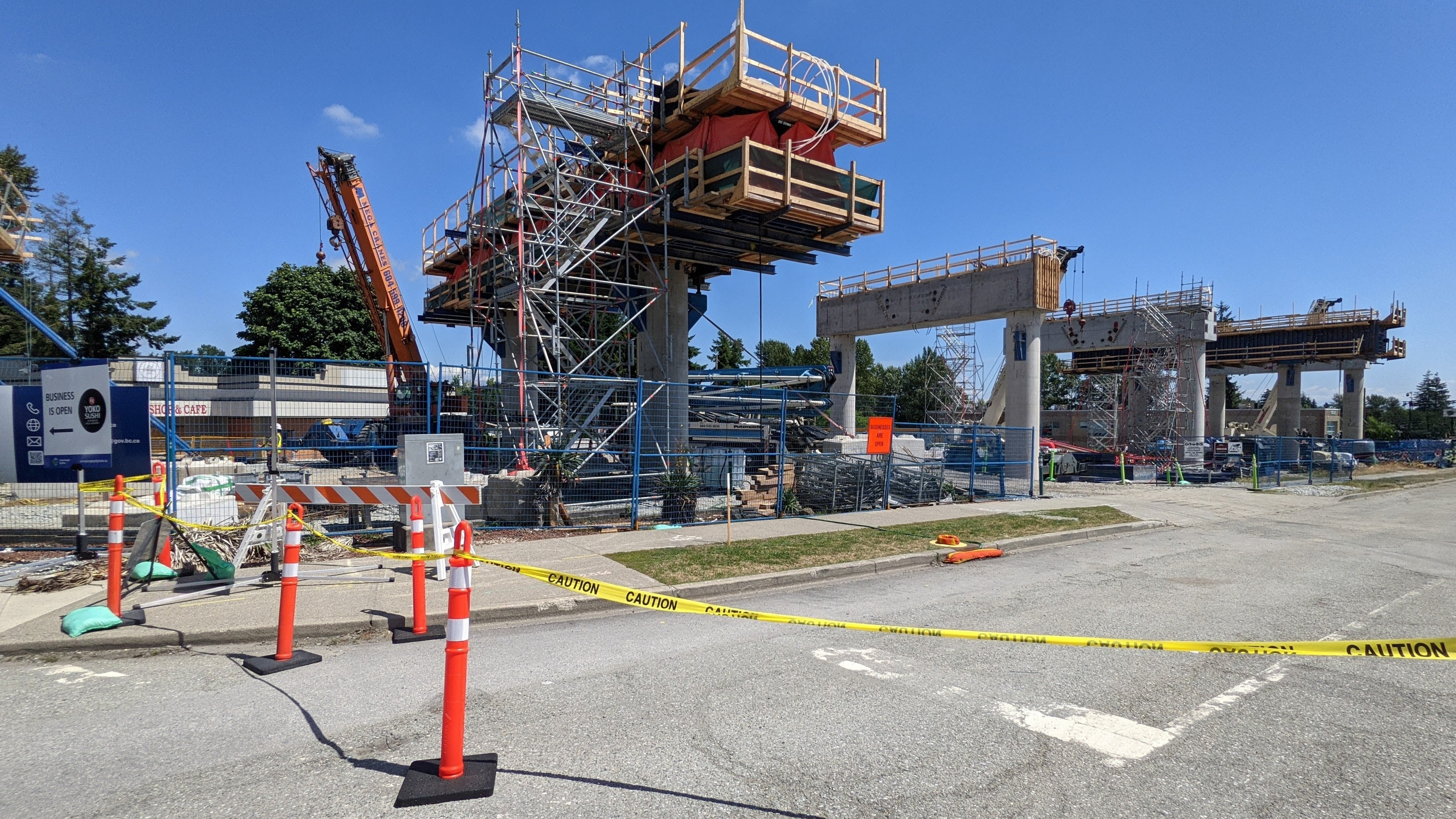
- Fleetwood station construction in July 2025

General information
- Location: Surrey
- Coordinates: 49°09′27″N 122°46′43″W
- System: SkyTrain station
- Owner: TransLink
- Platforms: Side platforms
- Tracks: 2

Construction
- Structure type: Elevated
- Accessible: Yes

Other information
- Status: Under construction
- Fare zone: 3

History
- Opening: 2029 (3 years' time)

Services
Preceding station	TransLink	Following station
152 Street towards Waterfront	Expo Line Langley extension (opens 2029)	Bakerview–166 Street towards Langley City Centre
Location

Fleetwood is an elevated station under construction on the Expo Line of Metro Vancouver's SkyTrain rapid transit system. It will be located at the northeast corner of the intersection of Fraser Highway and 160 Street in the Fleetwood town centre of Surrey, British Columbia, Canada. It is scheduled to open in 2029.

The station will be located in the core area of the City of Surrey's "Fleetwood Plan", which plans to densify the neighbourhood and create a high street. Upon completion, the station will be nearby to the Fleetwood Community Centre.
