= Fraser Highway =

Highway in British Columbia, Canada

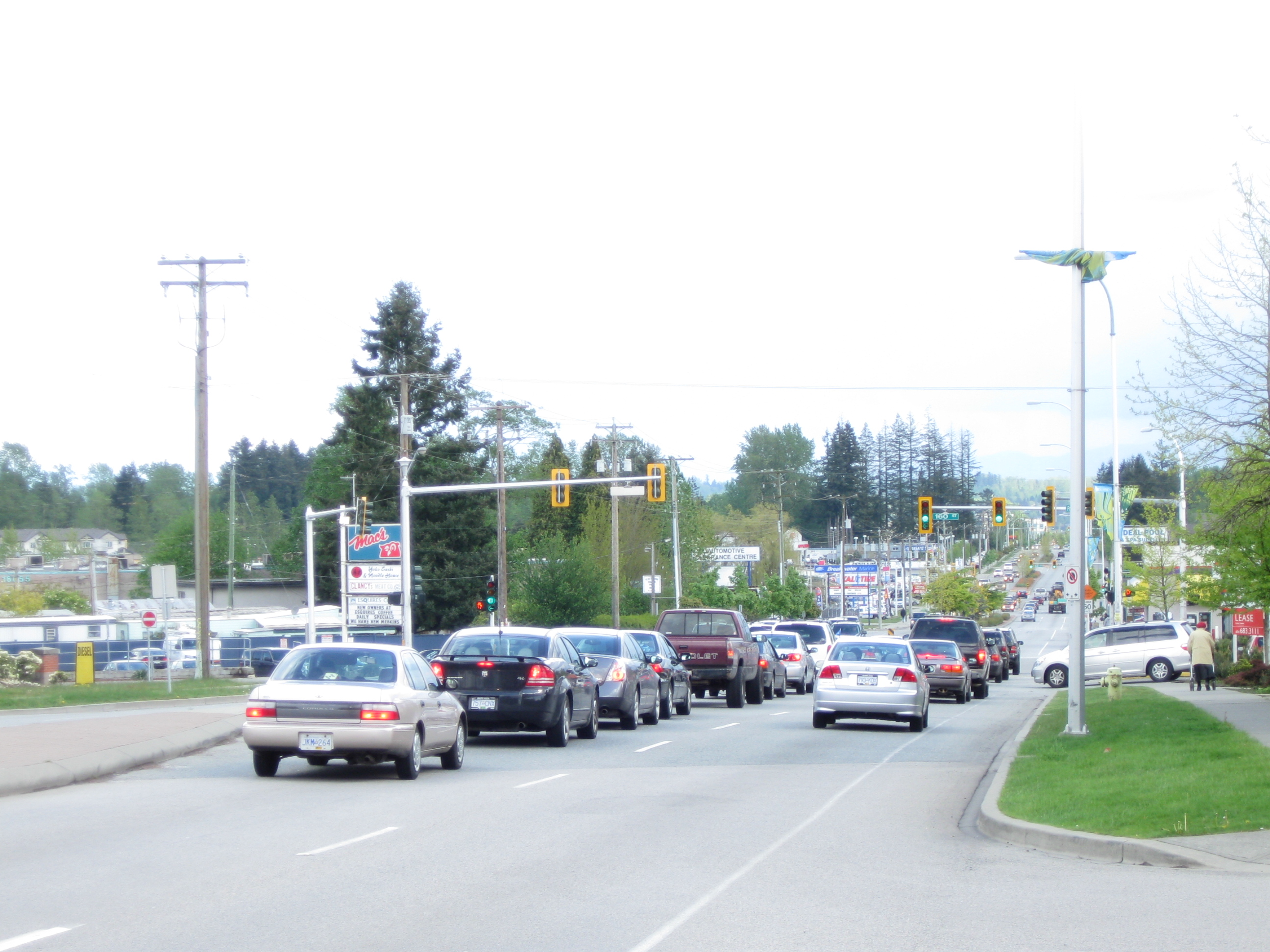
- Looking east along Fraser Highway near 160 Street
- Part of: Highway 1A (former)
- Maintained by: TransLink, City of Abbotsford
- Length: 38 km (24 mi)
- Location: Surrey, Langley (city), Langley (township), Abbotsford
- West end: King George Boulevard in Surrey
- Major junctions: Highway 15 (176 Street); Highway 10 (Langley Bypass); Highway 13 (264 Street)
- East end: Highway 1 (TCH) / Maclure Road in Abbotsford

Fraser Highway is a 38-kilometre-long (24 mi) major arterial road in the Lower Mainland of British Columbia. Connecting the cities of Surrey and Abbotsford, the highway formerly constituted a major portion of British Columbia Highway 1A until the latter was decommissioned in 2006. The highway is named for the Fraser River and the Fraser Valley, which are in turn named for the explorer Simon Fraser.

The road was one of the first motor highways in British Columbia, being formed from portions of the Old Yale wagon road in the 1920s, and was known as the Inter-Provincial Highway but its importance as an east-west corridor was diminished with the construction of the Trans-Canada Highway in the 1960s. Nonetheless, it remains an important thoroughfare. Running roughly parallel to the Trans-Canada Highway, it is often used as an alternative or feeder route for it.

== Route description ==
The Fraser Highway runs in a generally southeast-northwest direction, roughly paralleling the Trans Canada Highway to the north of it. It alternates back and forth between one lane each direction (total of 2 lanes) to two lanes each direction (total of 4 lanes) between rural and urban surroundings.

Its western terminus is at King George Boulevard and 98th Avenue in the Whalley Town Centre of Surrey, just south of the King George SkyTrain Station. From there, it passes through the mixed residential, commercial, and rural neighbourhoods of Green Timbers, Fleetwood, and Cloverdale.

Leaving Surrey, the route bisects the City of Langley, before entering the more rural neighbourhoods of Murrayville, and Aldergrove in Langley Township.

The eastern terminus is at the Trans-Canada Highway, just east of Mount Lehman Road, in the Clearbrook neighbourhood of Abbotsford.

== Major intersections ==
Regional District	Location	km	mi	Destinations	Notes
Metro Vancouver	Surrey	0.0	0.0	King George Boulevard / 98th Avenue	Former Highway 99A; former Highway 1A continued on King George Boulevard; continues as 98th Avenue; near King George station and King George Hub
Metro Vancouver	Surrey	0.9	0.56	140th Street	Near Green Timbers station (under construction)
Metro Vancouver	Surrey	1.4	0.87	96th Avenue	Passes through Green Timbers Urban Forest Park
Metro Vancouver	Surrey	3.6	2.2	152nd Street	Near 152 Street station (under construction)
Metro Vancouver	Surrey	4.3	2.7	88th Avenue	
Metro Vancouver	Surrey	5.6	3.5	160th Street	Near Fleetwood station (under construction)
Metro Vancouver	Surrey	7.0	4.3	166th Street	Near Bakerview–166 Street station (under construction)
Metro Vancouver	Surrey	9.4	5.8	Highway 15 (176th Street / Pacific Highway); Highway 1A begins	Current Highway 1A western terminus; west end of Highway 1A concurrency
Metro Vancouver	Surrey	11.3	7.0	184th Street	Near Hillcrest–184 Street station (under construction)
Metro Vancouver	Surrey	12.8	8.0	190th Street / 192nd Street Diversion	Intersection proposed; near Clayton station (under construction)
Metro Vancouver	Surrey–Langley (township) boundary	14.2	8.8	196th Street / Willowbrook Drive	Near Willowbrook station (under construction) and Willowbrook Shopping Centre
Metro Vancouver	Langley (township)–Langley (city) boundary	14.6	9.1	Highway 1A east / Highway 10 (Langley Bypass) to Highway 1 (TCH) – Hope, Surrey, Ferries, Airport (YVR)	East end of Highway 1A concurrency
Metro Vancouver	Langley (city)	15.2	9.4	200th Street	
Metro Vancouver	Langley (city)	16.0	9.9	203rd Street	Near Langley City Centre station (under construction)
Metro Vancouver	Langley (city)	16.3	10.1	Glover Road / 204th Street	West end of eastbound one-way
Metro Vancouver	Langley (city)	16.7	10.4	206th Street	East end of eastbound one-way
Metro Vancouver	Langley (city)	17.3	10.7	Highway 1A west (Langley Bypass) / 208th Street	West end of Highway 1A concurrency
Metro Vancouver	Langley (township)	18.8	11.7	216th Street	Near Langley Regional Airport
Metro Vancouver	Langley (township)	29.3	18.2	Highway 13 (264 Street) to Highway 1 (TCH) – U.S. Border, Bellingham; Highway 1A ends	Aldergrove; Highway 1A current eastern terminus; east end of Highway 1A concurrency
Fraser Valley	Abbotsford	37.4– 37.7	23.2– 23.4	Highway 1 (TCH) / Mount Lehman Road / Maclure Road – Vancouver, Hope, Airport (YXX)	Highway 1 exit 83; former Highway 1A eastern terminus; continues as Maclure Road
1.000 mi = 1.609 km; 1.000 km = 0.621 mi: Concurrency terminus; Incomplete access; Proposed
