= Willow Brook =

Willow Brook may refer to:

- Willow Brook (Otsego Lake tributary), a creek in New York
- Willow Brook (River Nene), Northamptonshire, England
- Willow Brook, Missouri, an unincorporated community
- Willow Brook (Utley Brook tributary), Pennsylvania, United States

== See also ==
- Willowbrook (disambiguation)
