= Green Timbers station =

Metro Vancouver SkyTrain station

Green Timbers
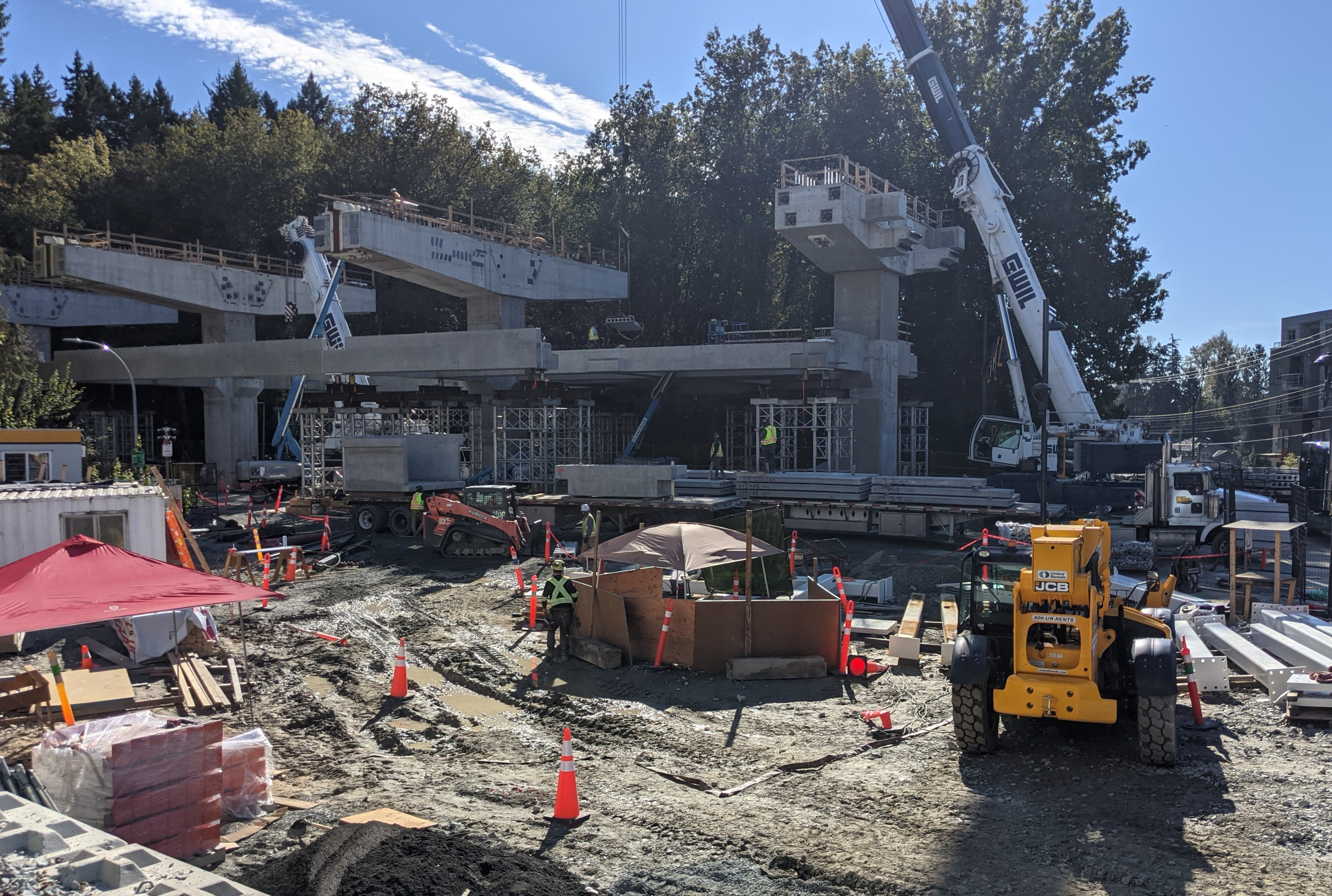
- Green Timbers station construction in October 2025

General information
- Location: Surrey, British Columbia
- Coordinates: 49°10′43″N 122°50′03″W
- System: SkyTrain station
- Owner: TransLink
- Platforms: Side platforms
- Tracks: 2

Construction
- Structure type: Elevated
- Accessible: Yes

Other information
- Status: Under construction
- Fare zone: 3

History
- Opening: 2029 (3 years' time)

Services
Preceding station	TransLink	Following station
King George towards Waterfront	Expo Line Langley extension (opens 2029)	152 Street towards Langley City Centre
Location

Green Timbers is an elevated station under construction on the Expo Line of Metro Vancouver's SkyTrain rapid transit system. It will be located above Fraser Highway on the east side of 140 Street in the Surrey City Centre district of Surrey, British Columbia, Canada.

The station is named after the nearby Green Timbers Urban Forest Park and will be adjacent to the Jim Pattison Outpatient Care and Surgery Centre. It is scheduled to open in 2029.

== Structure and design ==
Due to the protected Green Timbers Urban Forest Park zone, the station is built over the Fraser Highway, and access to the platform is done from underneath the platforms and from the side of the station. Immediately to the east of the station, a pocket track spanning to 96 Avenue is being constructed with the capacity to store several trains and allow for potential short turn service at Green Timbers.
