= Willowbrook Mall =

Willowbrook Mall may refer to:

- Willowbrook Mall (Houston), a shopping mall in Houston, Texas, United States
- Willowbrook Mall (New Jersey), a shopping mall in Wayne, New Jersey, United States
- Willowbrook Shopping Centre, a shopping mall in Langley Township, British Columbia, Canada (colloquially referred to as Willowbrook Mall)
