= Hillcrest–184 Street station =

Metro Vancouver SkyTrain station

Hillcrest–184 Street
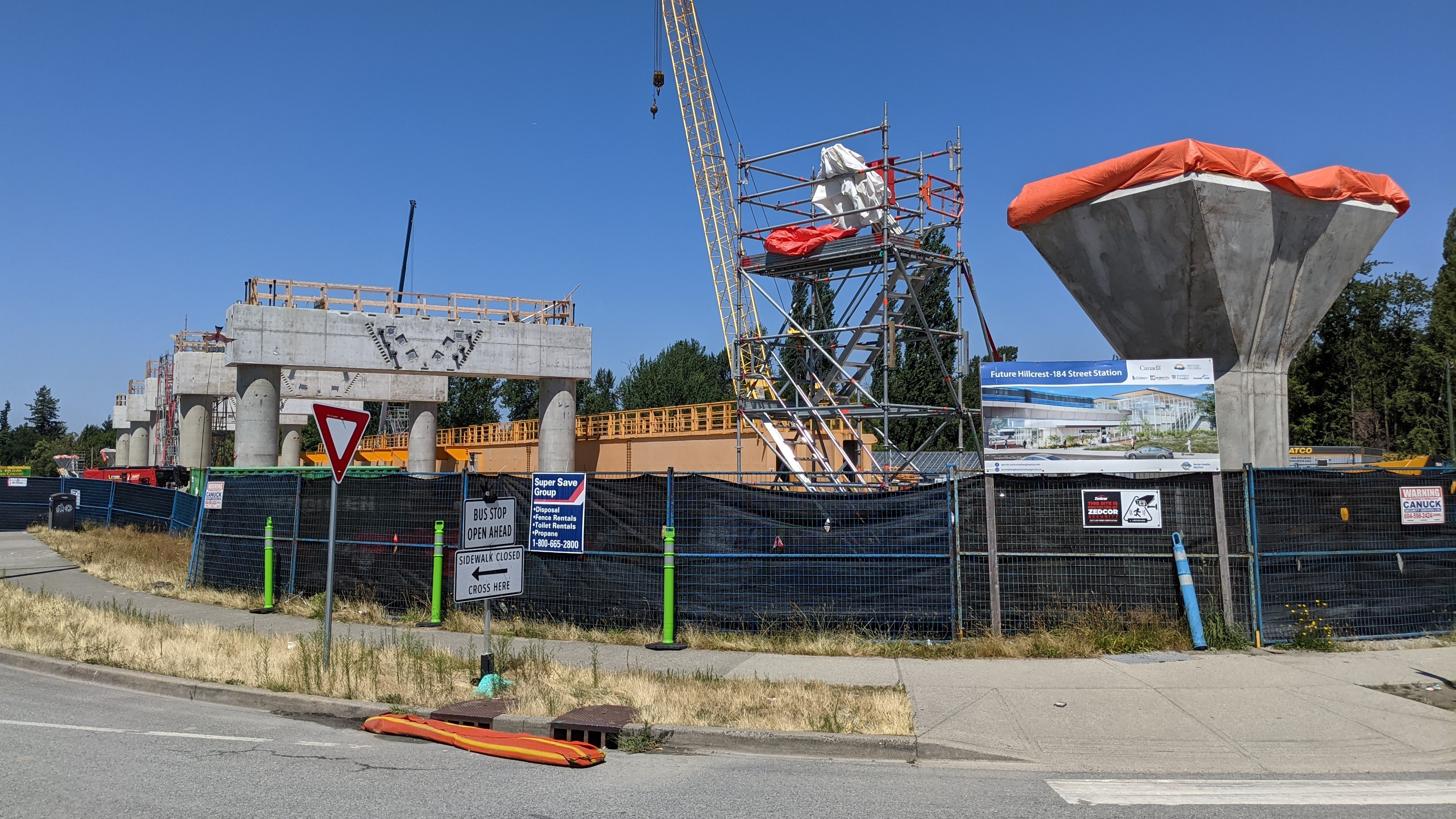
- Hillcrest–184 Street station construction in July 2025

General information
- Location: Surrey
- Coordinates: 49°07′45″N 122°42′47″W
- System: SkyTrain station
- Owner: TransLink
- Platforms: Side platforms
- Tracks: 2

Construction
- Structure type: Elevated
- Accessible: Yes

Other information
- Status: Under construction
- Fare zone: 3

History
- Opening: 2029 (3 years' time)

Services
Preceding station	TransLink	Following station
Bakerview–166 Street towards Waterfront	Expo Line Langley extension (opens 2029)	Clayton towards Langley City Centre
Location

Hillcrest–184 Street is an elevated station under construction on the Expo Line of Metro Vancouver's SkyTrain rapid transit system. It will be located at the northwest corner of the intersection of Fraser Highway and 184 Street, near the border between the Hillcrest and Clayton neighbourhoods of Cloverdale in Surrey, British Columbia, Canada. It is scheduled to open in 2029.

The station will be nearby to Clayton Park and Clayton Heights Secondary School. Hillcrest–184 Street station is the starting point for two launching gantries: the Clayton Clipper and the Langley Launcher, which will construct the elevated guideway for the Surrey–Langley extension towards Bakerview–166 Street station and Langley City Centre station, respectively.
