= Clayton station (SkyTrain) =

Metro Vancouver SkyTrain station

Clayton

General information
- Location: Surrey
- Coordinates: 49°07′18″N 122°41′48″W
- System: SkyTrain station
- Owner: TransLink
- Platforms: Side platforms
- Tracks: 2

Construction
- Structure type: Elevated
- Accessible: Yes

Other information
- Status: Under construction
- Fare zone: 3

History
- Opening: 2029 (3 years' time)

Services
Preceding station	TransLink	Following station
Hillcrest–184 Street towards Waterfront	Expo Line Langley extension (opens 2029)	Willowbrook towards Langley City Centre
Location

Clayton is an elevated station under construction on the Expo Line of Metro Vancouver's SkyTrain rapid transit system. It will be located at the northwest corner of the future intersection of Fraser Highway and 190 Street in the Clayton neighbourhood of Cloverdale in Surrey, British Columbia, Canada. It is scheduled to open in 2029.

The station will be located in Clayton Centre, one of the core areas of the City of Surrey's "Clayton Corridor Plan". As of 2024, the station site is located on a plot of undeveloped land in a rural section of Clayton.
