= 152 Street station =

Metro Vancouver SkyTrain station

152 Street
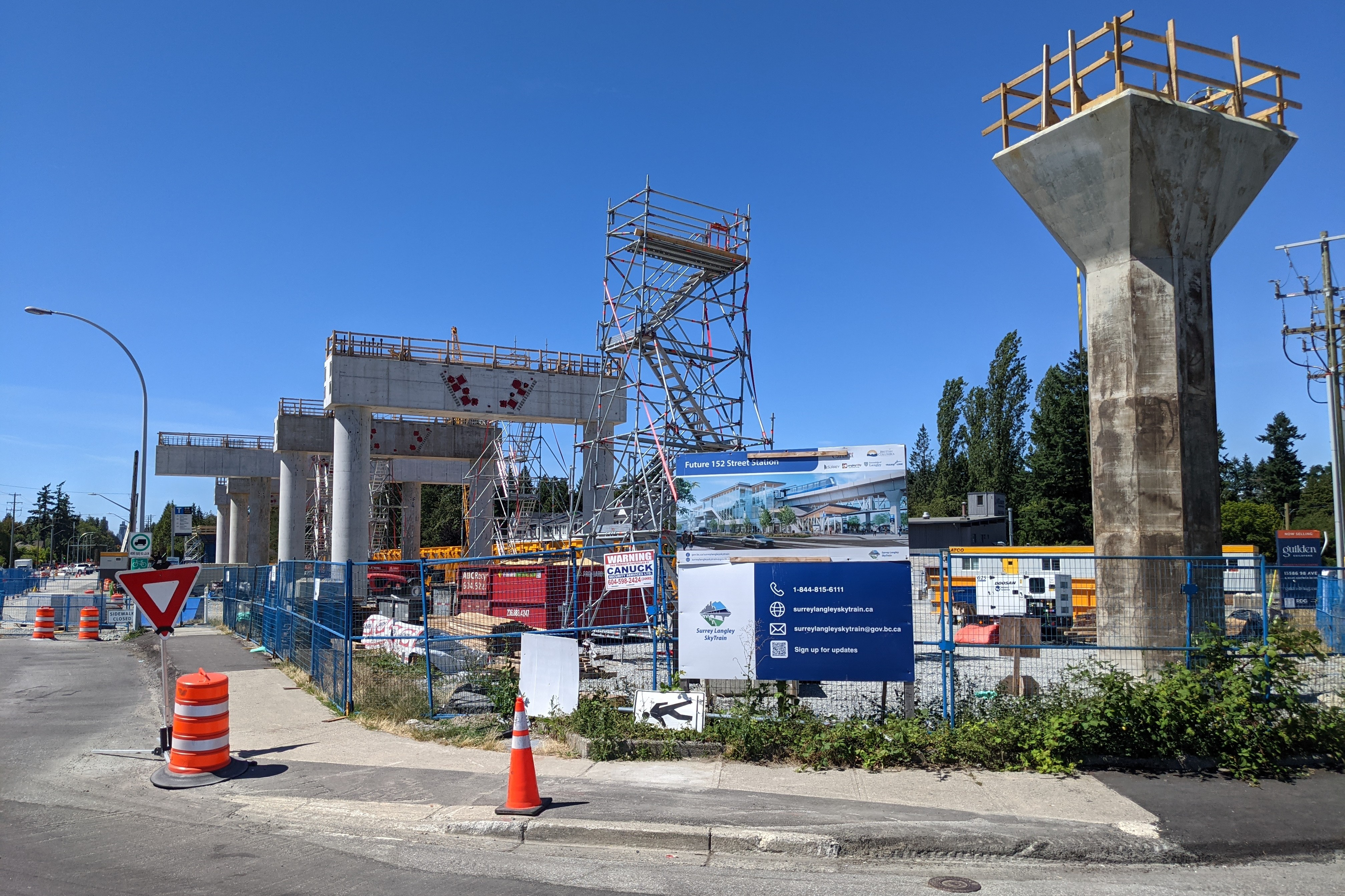
- 152 Street station construction in July 2025

General information
- Location: Surrey
- Coordinates: 49°09′59″N 122°48′07″W
- System: SkyTrain station
- Owner: TransLink
- Platforms: Side platforms
- Tracks: 2

Construction
- Structure type: Elevated
- Accessible: Yes

Other information
- Status: Under construction
- Fare zone: 3

History
- Opening: 2029 (3 years' time)

Services
Preceding station	TransLink	Following station
Green Timbers towards Waterfront	Expo Line Langley extension (opens 2029)	Fleetwood towards Langley City Centre
Location

152 Street is an elevated station under construction on the Expo Line of Metro Vancouver's SkyTrain rapid transit system. It will be located at the northwest corner of the intersection of Fraser Highway and 152 Street in the Fleetwood town centre of Surrey, British Columbia, Canada. It is scheduled to open in 2029.

The station will feature a pedestrian bridge that will connect to the east side of 152 Street. 152 Street station is the starting point for the Surrey Sprinter launching gantry, which will construct the elevated guideway for the Surrey–Langley extension towards King George station.
