= Willowbrook =

Willowbrook may refer to:

== Institutions ==
- Willowbrook High School in Villa Park, Illinois
- Willowbrook Museum Village, a museum in Newfield, Maine
- Willowbrook State School, a former state-supported institution for developmentally disabled children in Staten Island, New York

== Places ==
- Willowbrook, California
  - Willowbrook/Rosa Parks station
- Willowbrook, DuPage County, Illinois
- Willowbrook, Will County, Illinois
- Willowbrook, Kansas
- Willowbrook, Saskatchewan, Canada
- Willowbrook, Staten Island, a neighborhood of Staten Island, New York
- Willowbrook, Houston, Texas, a neighborhood in Texas
- Willowbrook (New Jersey), a shopping mall

== Other ==
- Willowbrook (bus manufacturer), a former vehicle body builder in England
- Willowbrook Rail Maintenance Facility, a GO Transit rail yard and rolling stock maintenance facility in Toronto, Canada
- Piper Willowbrook, main character of Nickelodeon's 2017 show Mysticons

== See also ==
- Willow Brook (disambiguation)
- Willowbrook Mall (disambiguation)
