= Willowbrook station (SkyTrain) =

Metro Vancouver SkyTrain station

Willowbrook
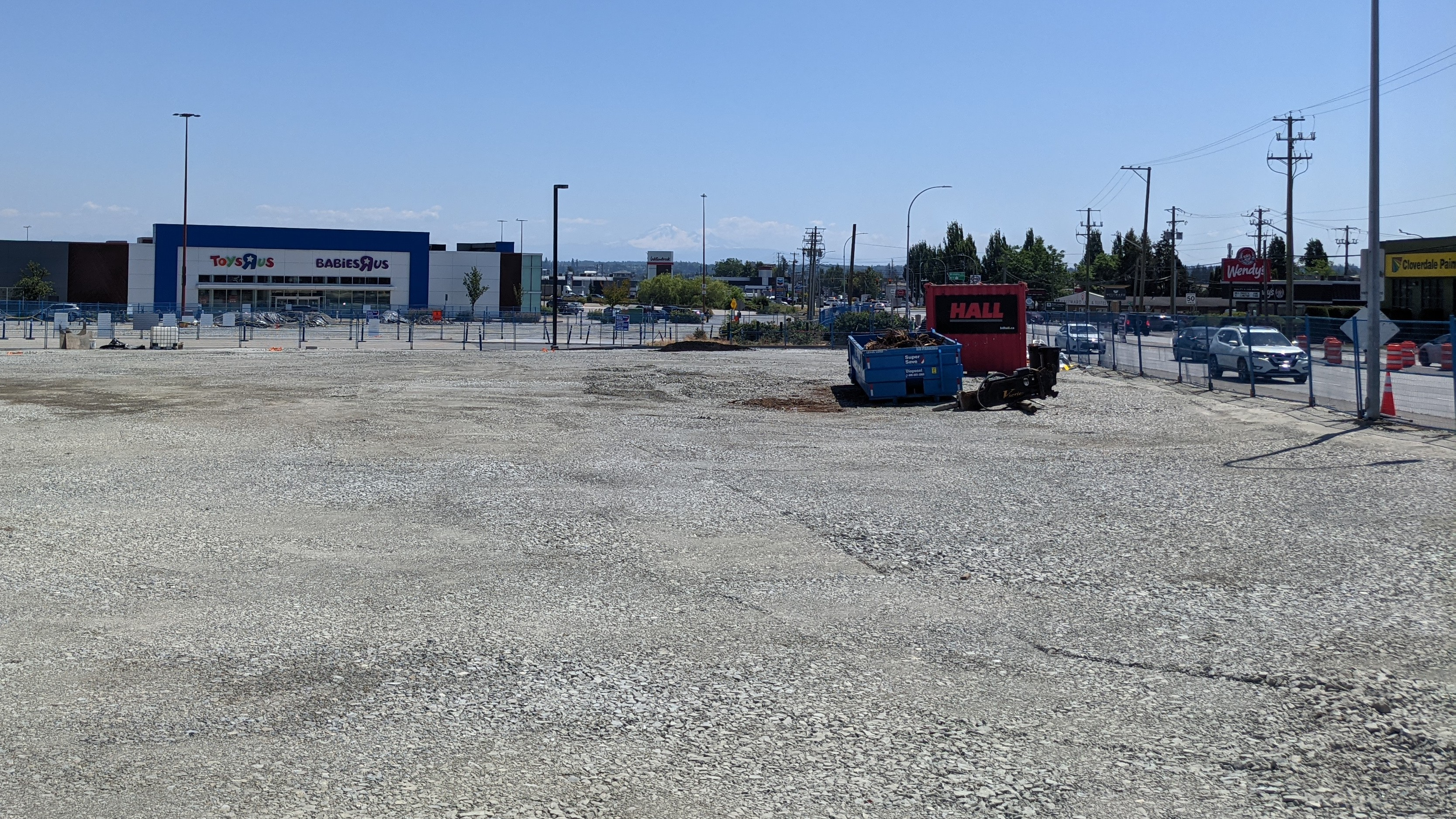
- Willowbrook station site in July 2025

General information
- Location: Langley Township
- Coordinates: 49°06′50″N 122°40′45″W
- System: SkyTrain station
- Owner: TransLink
- Platforms: Side platforms
- Tracks: 2

Construction
- Structure type: Elevated
- Accessible: Yes

Other information
- Status: Under construction
- Fare zone: 3

History
- Opening: 2029 (3 years' time)

Services
| Preceding station | TransLink | Following station |
|---|---|---|
| Clayton towards Waterfront | Expo Line Langley extension (opens 2029) | Langley City Centre Terminus |
Location

Willowbrook is an elevated station under construction on the Expo Line of Metro Vancouver's SkyTrain rapid transit system. It will be located on Fraser Highway at the northeast corner of the intersection between Willowbrook Drive and 196 Street in the Willowbrook neighbourhood of Langley Township, British Columbia, Canada. It is scheduled to open in 2029.

The station will be adjacent to the Willowbrook Shopping Centre and Westbrook Centre. Several high-rises have been proposed to redevelopment the area around the station. Willowbrook station will feature an off-street bus exchange and is the planned terminus for a future bus rapid transit service to Haney Place Exchange in Maple Ridge.
