= Fleetwood, Surrey =

Fleetwood
- Town centre of Surrey
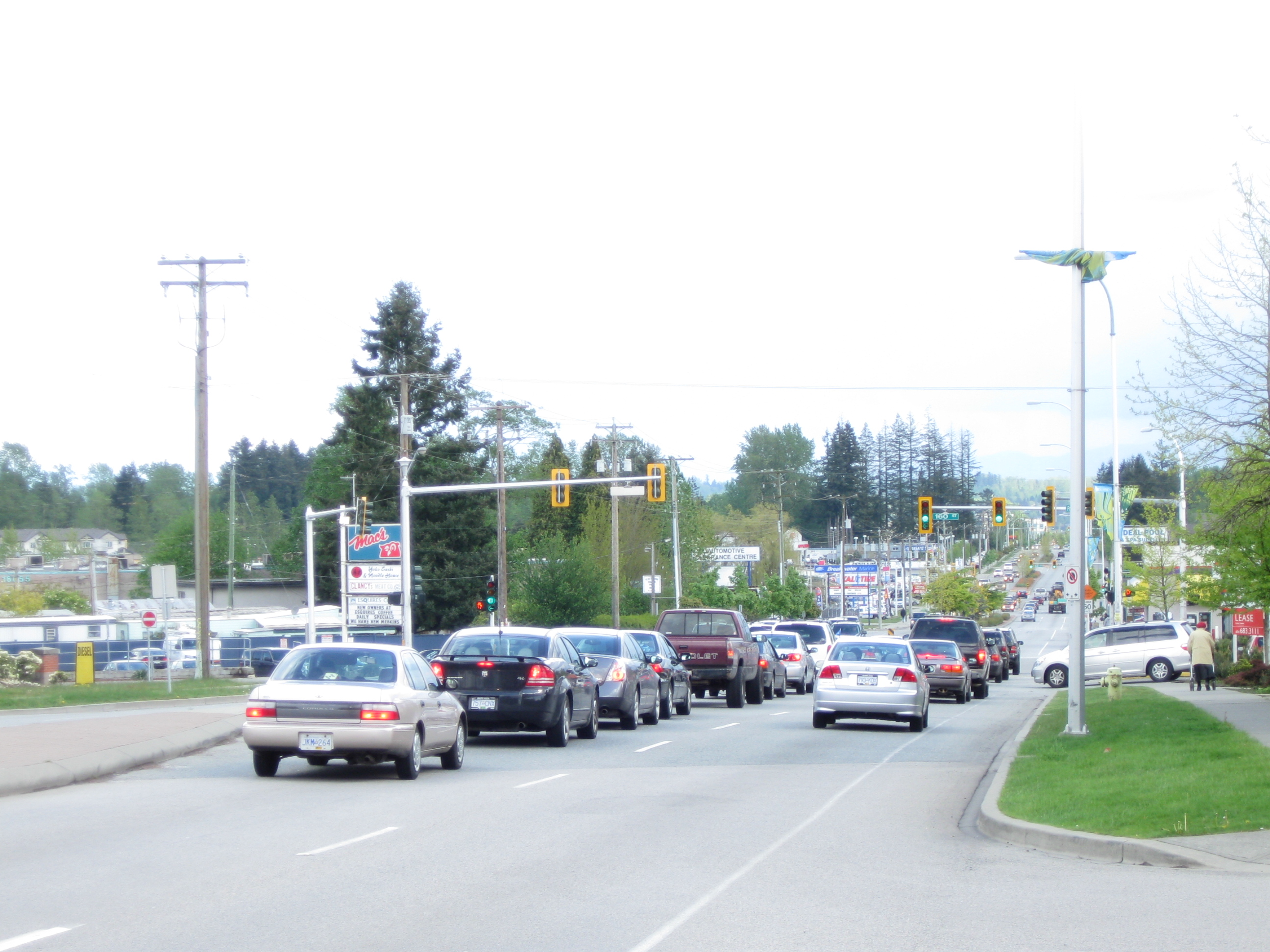
- An east-facing view of the core of Fleetwood along Fraser Highway & 160 Street

- Location of Fleetwood within Metro Vancouver
- Coordinates: 49°10′00″N 122°48′00″W
- Country: Canada
- Province: British Columbia
- Region: Lower Mainland
- Regional District: Metro Vancouver
- City: Surrey

Government
  - Mayor: Brenda Locke
  - MP (Fed.): Gurbux Saini (Liberal)
  - MLA (Prov.): Jagrup Brar (NDP)

Population (2016)
  - Total: 62,735
- Time zone: UTC−8 (PST)
  - Summer (DST): UTC−7 (PDT)

Fleetwood is a town centre of Surrey, British Columbia, Canada with a population of 62,735 as of 2016.

Fleetwood is bounded by 76 Avenue in the south (above Cloverdale) to 96 Avenue in the north and from 144 Street in the west to 172 Street in the east.

== Infrastructure ==
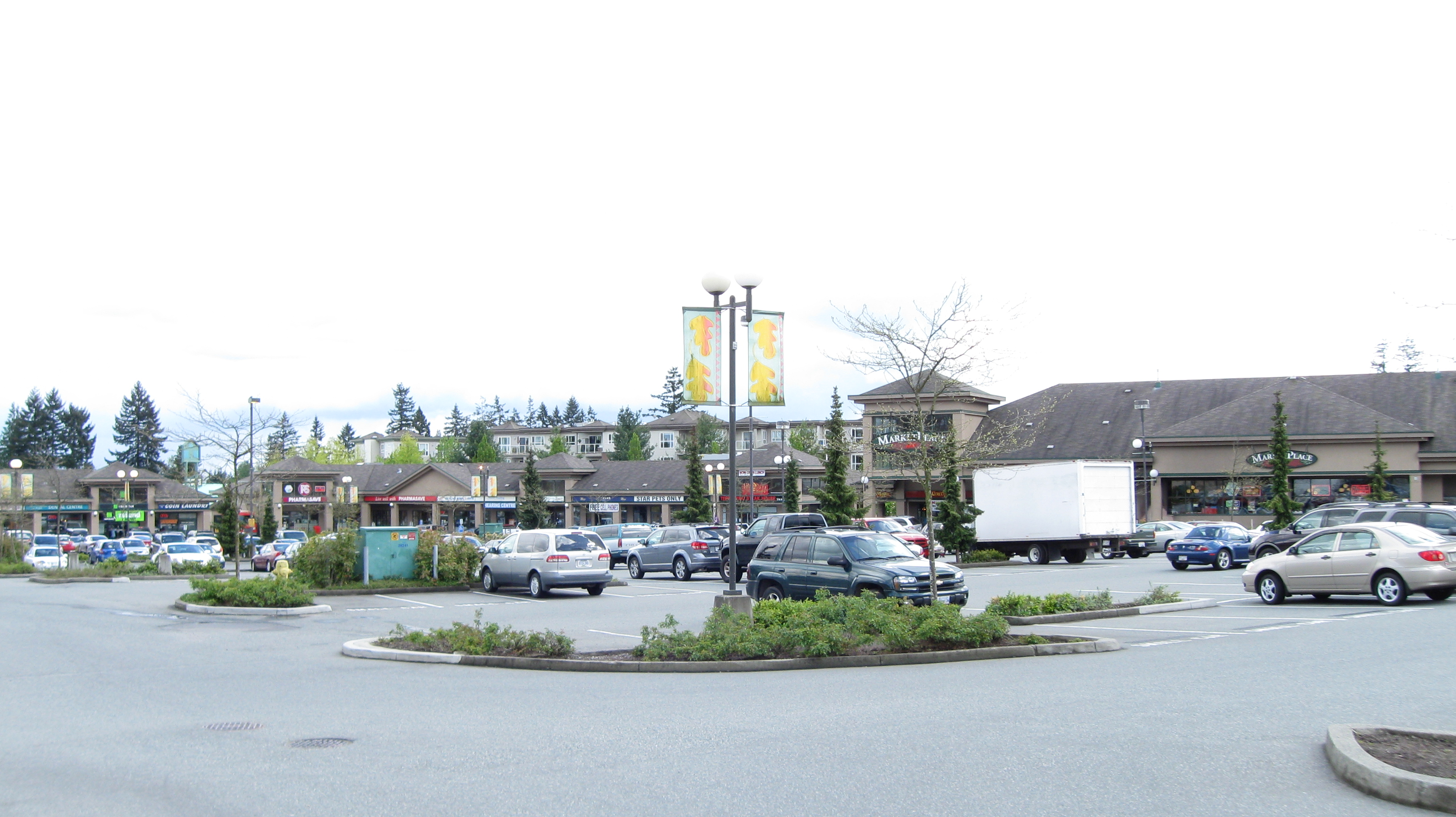
Fleetwood Town Centre mall along Fraser Highway near 160 Street

A branch of the Surrey Public Library, the Fleetwood Library, opened in 1995 as did the Fleetwood Community Center and the adjacent walking park, Francis Park (named after Edith Francis). The Surrey Sports and Leisure Center is managed by the manager of the Fleetwood Community Center.

== History ==
After the Yale Wagon Road (officially the Grand Trunk Road, now Old Yale Road) opened in the late 19th century, farming, logging and fishing became the primary industries of new settlers from New Westminster and Vancouver.

In 1907, Edith and James Francis settled near present-day 160 Street and Fraser Highway. Over the next decade, several of Edith's family — whose family name was Fleetwood — joined them. In August 1915, Edith's brother, Arthur Thomas Fleetwood (also known as Tom Fleetwood) joined the 46th Battalion of the Canadian Expeditionary Forces, and he was sent to France to fight in World War I. He died as a result of battle wounds on 8 September 1917.

Edith applied to the provincial government for a charter to name her community after her brother. In 1923, local residents formed the Fleetwood Community Association, with Edith as one of the founding members. The Fleetwood Community Hall was built in the 1930s, and is located across from the Fleetwood Community Centre, which opened in 1995.

During the Great Depression, population increased due to people seeking less-costly properties.

The Fleetwood Community Association commissioned a life-sized bronze sculpture of Thomas Fleetwood which was unveiled on 6 September 2008 at the Fleetwood Community Centre.

Rapid population growth beginning in the 1970s brought with it retail, commercial and multi-family residential developments. Residents turned down attempts to develop light industrial properties.

In December 2018, an extension of the regional rapid transit network Skytrain Expo Line was approved. The extension passed through Fleetwood and is planned to continue into Langley City by 2025.

== Demographics ==
Faith in Fleetwood, Surrey (2021)
1. Christian (35.0%)
2. No religion (26.6%)
3. Sikh (24.5%)
4. Hindu (5.20%)
5. Muslim (4.80%)
6. Buddhist (3.40%)
7. Jewish (0.10%)
8. Other (0.50%)

| Ethnic groups in Fleetwood (2021) Source: | | % |
|---|---|---|
| Ethnic group | South Asian | 34.6% |
| Ethnic group | European | 22.3% |
| Ethnic group | Chinese | 13.6% |
| Ethnic group | Filipino | 9.9% |
| Ethnic group | Korean | 4% |
| Ethnic group | Other | 15% |
| Total % | | 100% |

| Languages spoken in Fleetwood (2016) Source: | | % |
|---|---|---|
| Language | English | 62% |
| Language | Punjabi | 16% |
| Language | Mandarin | 5% |
| Language | Tagalog | 3% |
| Language | Korean | 2% |
| Language | Other | 12% |
| Total % | | 100% |
