= Green Timbers Urban Forest Park =

Public park in Surrey, British Columbia

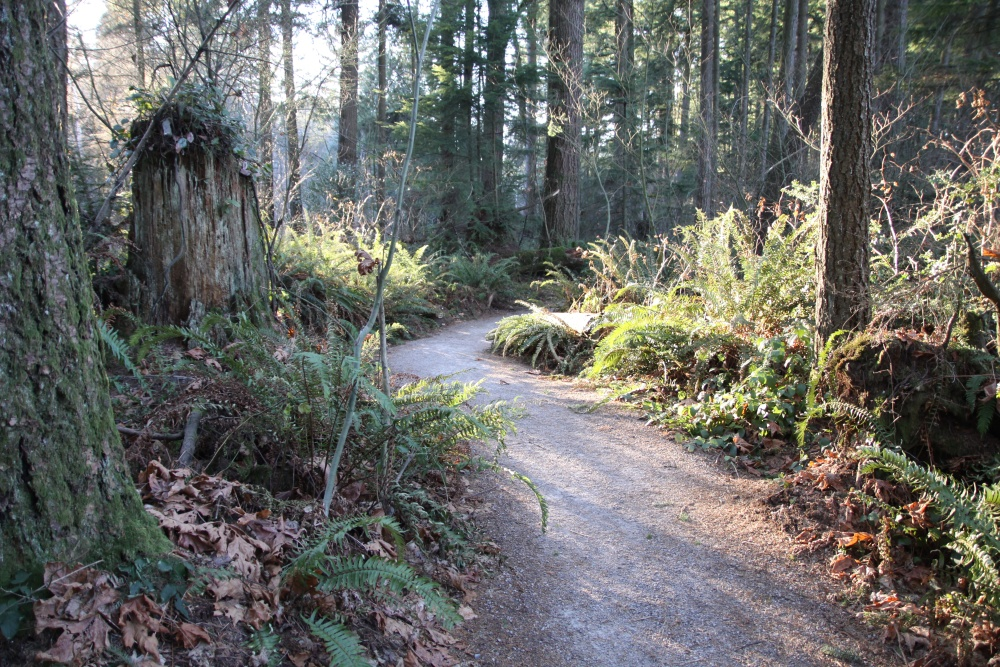
- A trail through the forest in 2013

- Location within British Columbia Location within Canada
- Type: Urban park
- Location: 14600 Block of, 100 Ave, Surrey, BC V3V 7Z2, Canada
- Coordinates: 49.1807°N 122.8194°W
- Area: 560 acres (230 ha)
- Created: 1974
- Website: www.greentimbers.ca

Green Timbers Urban Forest Park is a 560 acres (230 ha) urban park in Surrey, British Columbia. It contains an urban secondary forest with over 10 km (6.2 mi) of nature trails, a fishing lake, picnic areas, and a nature center.

== History ==
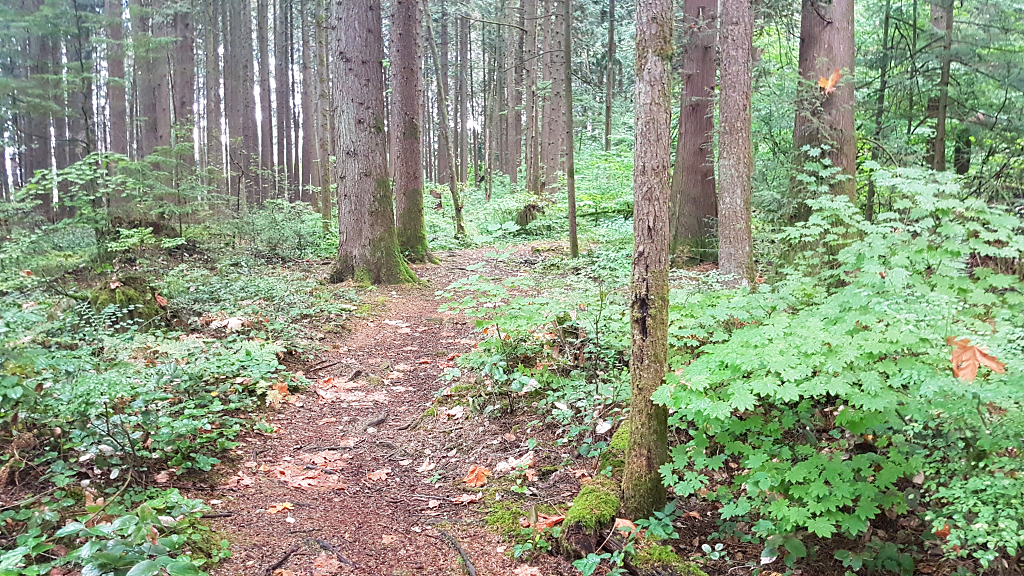
A trail through the forest in 2017

The land the park is on was originally a large forest of 5,000 acres (2,000 ha), and it was a popular tourist destination in the early 1900s because of the tall trees it contained and its proximity to the Pacific Highway. It was also known as the only old-growth forest near the highway on the West Coast. Attempts were made as early as 1860 to designate the park for conservation. The trees began to be cut down in 1923 by the King-Farris Company despite advocacy to protect them. The company was to use the logs for their sawmill in Newton, Surrey. After the area was completely cleared out in 1930, the BC Forest Service created an inaugural plantation to replant the trees on March 15 of that year. Foreign and non-native trees such as red pine were also planted. The area later functioned as a forestry school and nursery, being dubbed as British Columbia's "Birthplace of Reforestation".

In 1966, 33 acres (13 ha) of the forest was set aside to become the site of Douglas College; later, some parts of the forest were sold to the City of Surrey for residential housing. The forest became a park in 1974 and the Green Timbers Heritage Society (GTHS) was formed in 1987 to prevent the forest from becoming the site of a football stadium. Residents of Surrey voted to designate parts of the park as an urban forest in 1988 and 1996. In 2005, the headquarters of the E Division of the Royal Canadian Mounted Police was constructed in the park. The park also became the home of the Jim Pattison Outpatient Care and Surgery Centre in 2011.

== Features ==
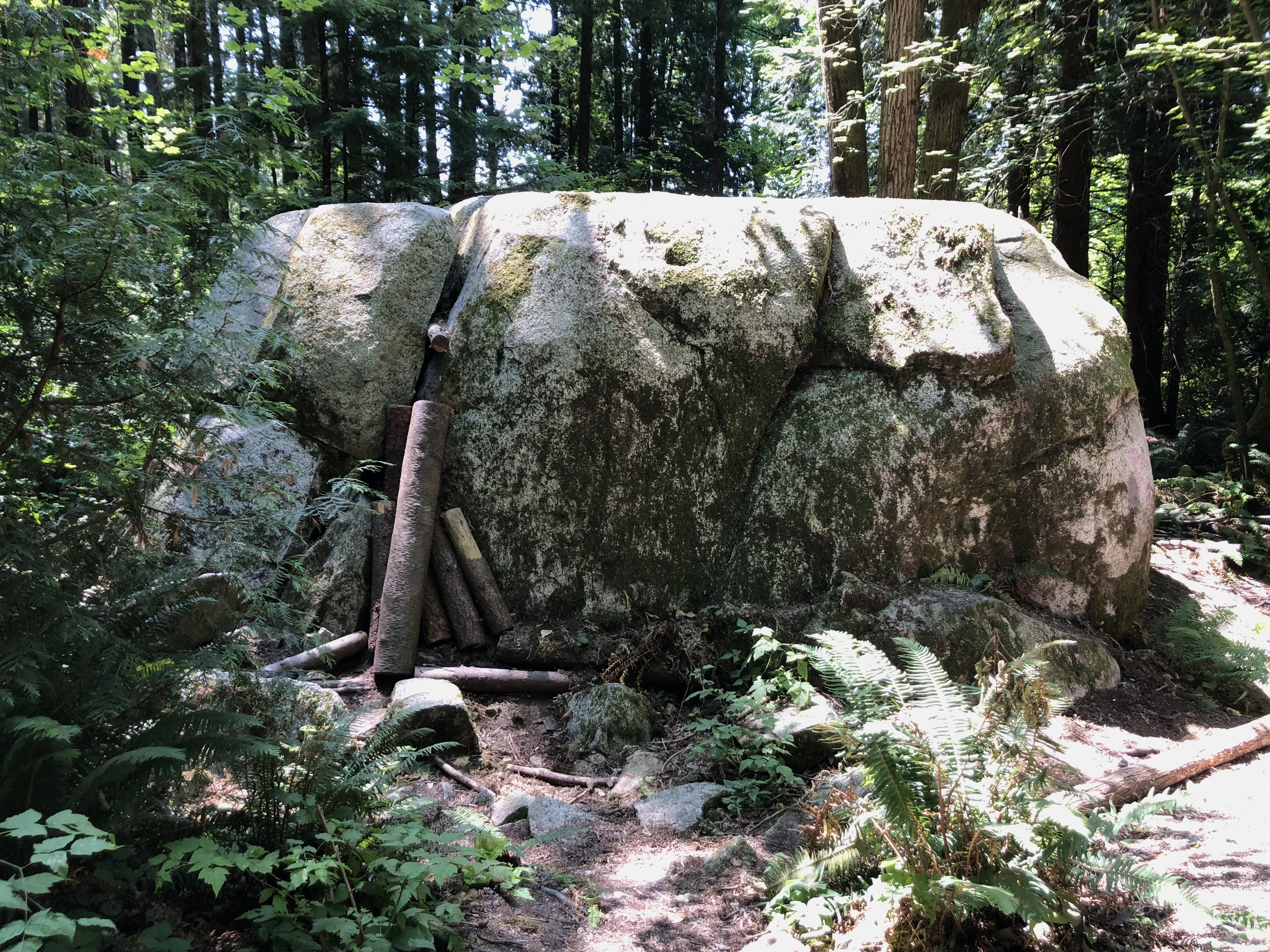
The glacial erratic in 2021

The park contains a glacial erratic, a rock that was carried a significant distance by glaciers. The ground has a slight slope downward from northeast to southwest. The park contains a clearing and meadow with a lake containing rainbow trout in the spring and fall.

=== Wildlife ===
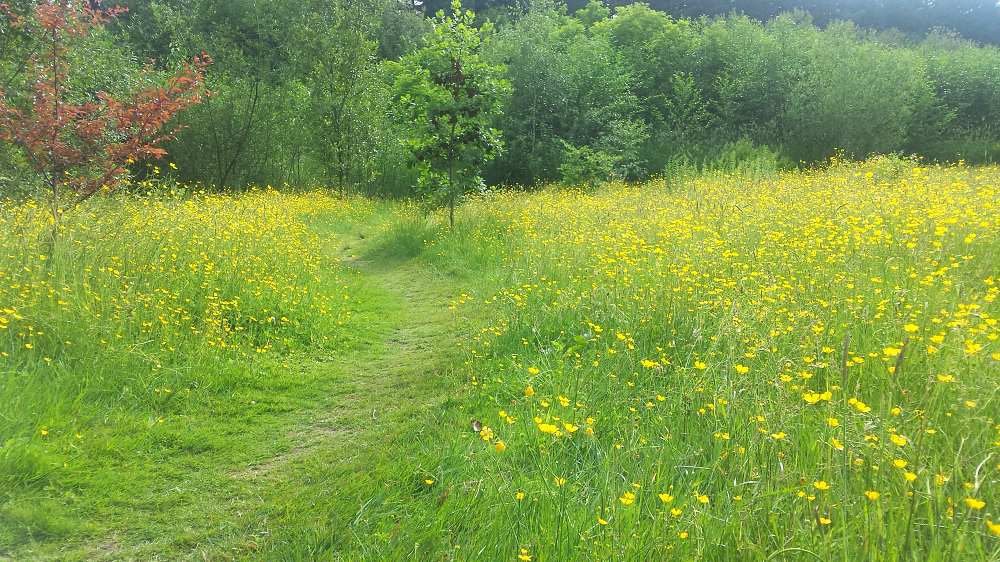
The meadow in 2016

Bird species that can be found in the park include American crows, American robins, bald eagles, barn swallows, Bewick's wrens, black-capped chickadees, buffleheads, Canada geese, dark-eyed juncos, downy woodpeckers, great blue herons, greater scaups, house finches, mallards, northern flickers, pine siskins, red-breasted sapsuckers, red-tailed hawks, red-winged blackbirds, spotted towhees, Steller's jays, western screech owls, and wood ducks. Other notable animals include coyotes, black-tailed jackrabbits, Western deer mice, Douglas squirrels, Virginia opossums, raccoons, Townsend's voles, Pacific banana slugs, Northwestern garter snakes, and Pacific tree frogs.

=== Vegetation ===
The park's soil is mainly composed of loam and clay, with some moist patches. The original layer of humus in the ground was eroded following the logging operations, and, as a result, many of the root systems of trees are shallow. The largest trees in the park are conifers, which were initially planted 10 ft (3.0 m) apart in rows. Douglas fir, grand fir, Sitka spruce, Western hemlock, Western redcedar, Western white pine, and Western yew can all be found. Deciduous trees include bitter cherry, black cottonwood, bigleaf maple, cascara, Garry oak, Pacific dogwood, red alder, Scouler's willow, vine maple, and white birch. Bracken, hard-fern, lady-fern, licorice fern, alpine buckler fern, and western swordfern and ferns that live in the park. Common flowers include Pacific bleeding heart, Canadian dwarf cornel, great mullein, spotted coralroot, fireweed, heart-leaved foamflower, foxglove, ghost plant, twistedstalk, sweet after death, snakeberry, and Pacific trillium. Shurbs are the most diverse species in the park, which includes bearberry honeysuckle, prickly wild rose, Devil's club, dwarf rose, rusty menziesia, Oregon boxleaf, hardhack, American hazelnut, red huckleberry, osoberry, rowan, Oregon grape, Alaska blueberry, Oregon crabapple, salal, cloudberry, saskatoon berry, common snowberry, stink currant, thimbleberry, and California blackberry. Aquatic plants include bulrush, rough horsetail, western skunk cabbage, common rush, and northern water plantain.
