= Willowbrook Shopping Centre =

Shopping mall in Metro Vancouver, Canada

Coordinates: 49.11451°N 122.67498°W

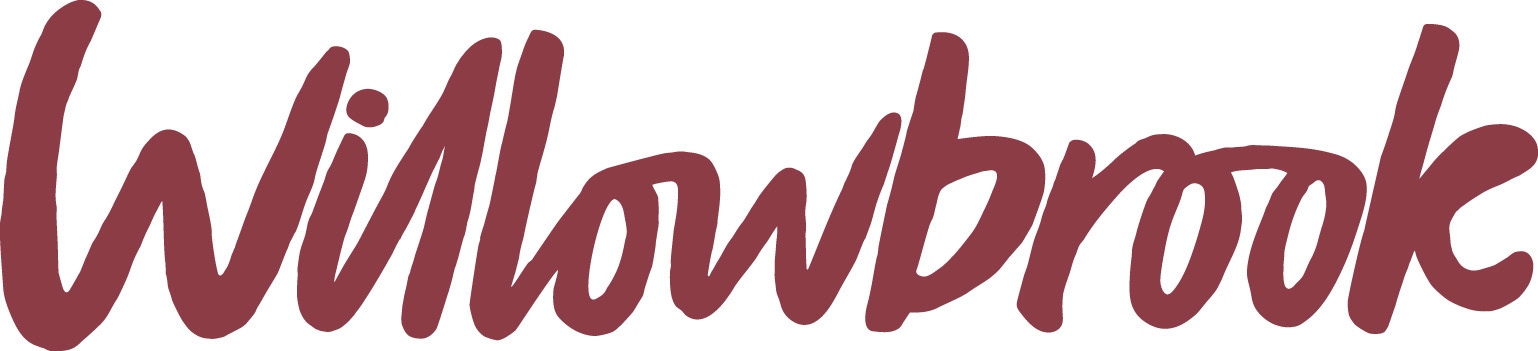

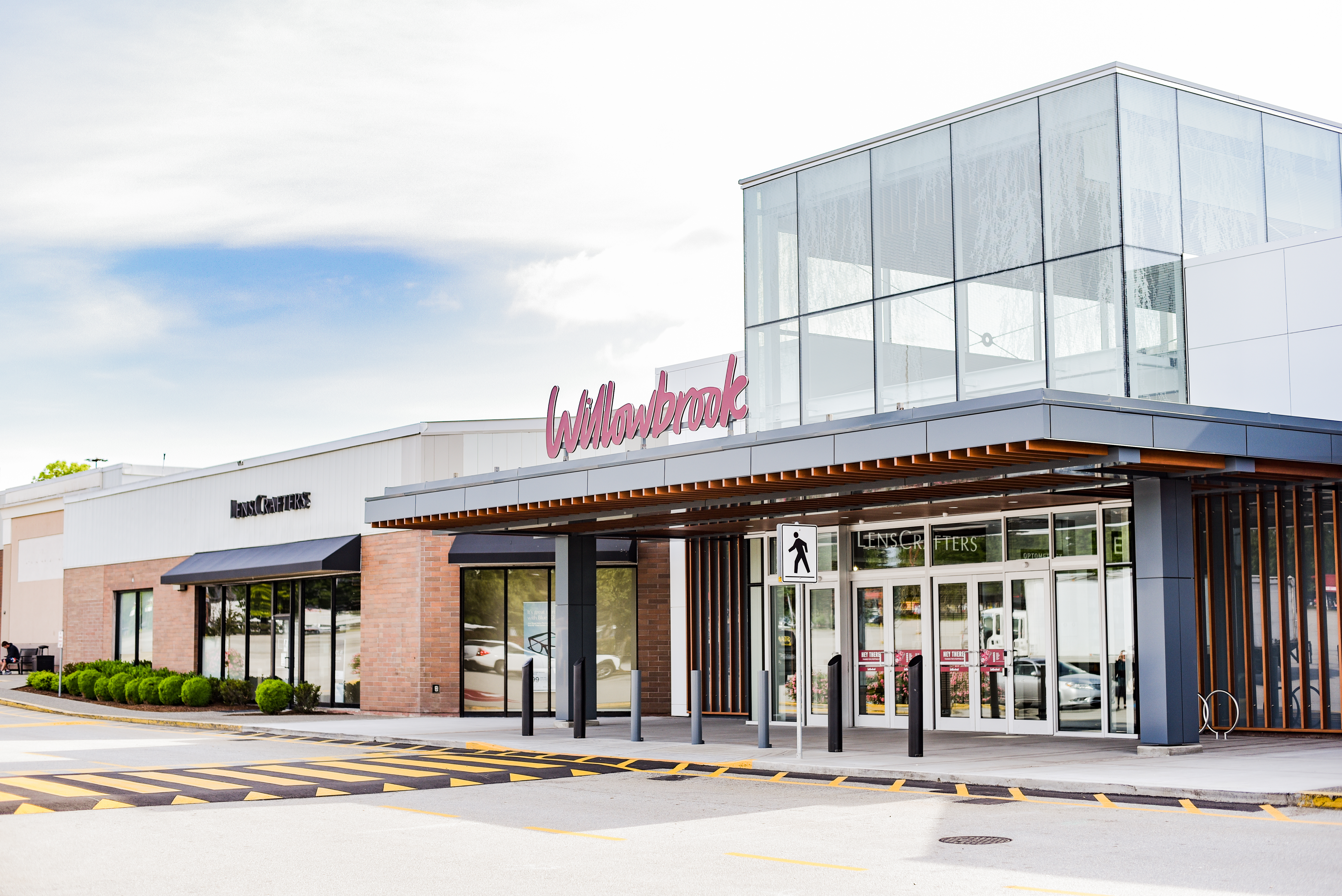
- Address: 19705 Fraser Highway; Langley, British Columbia; V3A 7E9
- Opened: 1979
- Manager: QuadReal Property Group
- Owner: QuadReal Property Group
- Num. of stores: 140
- Num. of anchor tenants: 6
- Floor area: 60,064 square metres (646,520 sq ft)
- Floors: 1
- Website: shopwillowbrook.com

Willowbrook Shopping Centre (sometimes referred to as Willowbrook Mall) is a shopping centre in the Fraser Valley area of Metro Vancouver, Canada. Situated on Fraser Highway at Highway 10 (Langley By-Pass), Willowbrook is located half in the City of Langley and half in the Township of Langley in British Columbia. The mall is 40 minutes southeast of Vancouver. As of January 2021, Willowbrook Shopping Centre has over 60,064 square metres (646,520 sq ft) of retail space.

== Expansion ==
The shopping centre opened in 1979 and has undergone a number of major expansions and renovations, with the most recent one being completed in 2023. This gave the shopping centre an additional 13,000 square metres (140,000 sq ft) of space which includes: a food precinct, an outdoor pedestrian shopping area and gathering spaces.

== Transportation ==
Willowbrook is served by the 320, 370, 501, 502, 503, 531 and the 564 bus routes operated by TransLink, the transportation authority serving Metro Vancouver. TransLink plans to build Willowbrook Exchange, along with a proposed SkyTrain station as part of the Expo Line extension to Langley Centre, to serve the shopping centre and surrounding community.

== See also ==
- List of shopping malls in Canada
