= Langley City Centre station =

Metro Vancouver SkyTrain station

Langley City Centre
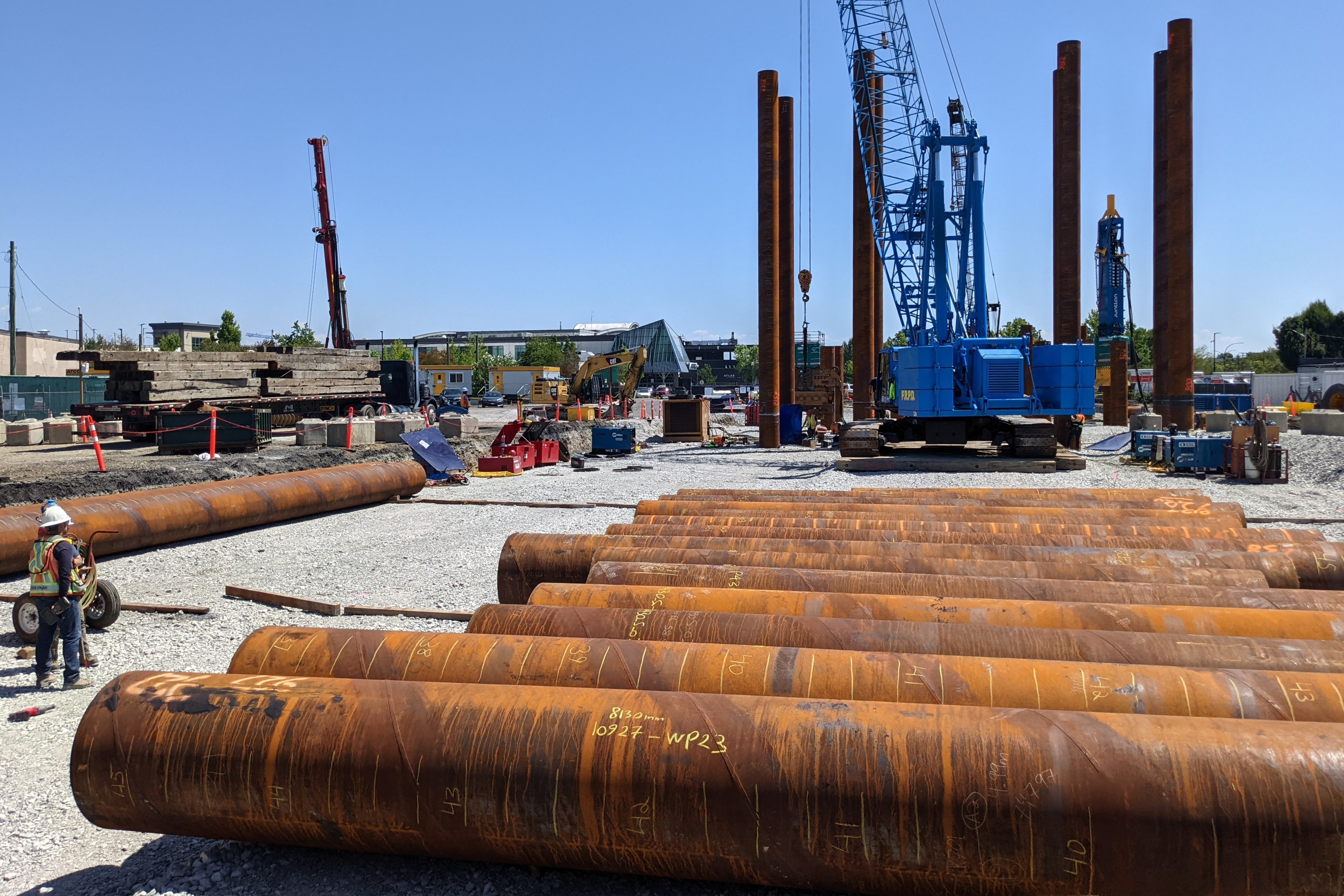
- Langley City Centre station construction in July 2025

General information
- Location: Langley City
- Coordinates: 49°06′23″N 122°39′35″W
- System: SkyTrain station
- Owner: TransLink
- Platforms: Centre platform
- Tracks: 2

Construction
- Structure type: Elevated
- Accessible: yes

Other information
- Status: Under construction
- Fare zone: 3

History
- Opening: 2029 (3 years' time)

Services
Preceding station	TransLink	Following station
Willowbrook towards Waterfront	Expo Line Langley extension (opens 2029)	Terminus
Location

Langley City Centre is an elevated station under construction on the Expo Line of Metro Vancouver's SkyTrain rapid transit system. It will be located at the southeast corner of the intersection of Industrial Avenue and 203 Street in Langley City, British Columbia, Canada, and will be the eastern terminus of the Expo Line when completed. It is scheduled to open in 2029.

The station will be adjacent to the Cascades Casino and nearby Langley City Hall. It is planned to include an office for the Metro Vancouver Transit Police, washrooms, and bicycle parking facilities. Langley City Centre station will feature an off-street bus loop and layover facility that will replace the nearby Langley Centre exchange.
