= Kevin Cherkas =

Canadian chef and owner of Cuca Restaurant in Bali, Indonesia (born 1978)

- Born: 15 January 1978 (age 48); Vancouver, British Columbia, Canada
- Education: Culinary arts
- Alma mater: Vancouver Community College
- Culinary career
- Cooking style: Western cuisine
- Current restaurant: Cuca Restaurant (2013 - Present)
- Previous restaurants: Metropolitan Vancouver Hotel (1998-2001); Daniel (2001-2003); La Belle Auberge Restaurant (2003 - 2004); Arzak (2004 - 2005); Shangri-La Kuala Lumpur (2006 - 2008); Shangri-La Hotel Singapore (2008 - 2012)
- Award won: Confrérie de la Chaîne des Rôtisseurs

Kevin Cherkas (born January 15, 1978, in Vancouver) is a Canadian chef and owner of Cuca Restaurant in Bali, Indonesia.

== Education ==
Cherkas graduated with a degree in culinary arts from Vancouver Community College in 1999 and in 2001 obtained his Red Seal Chef certification.

== Career ==
Cherkas started his professional career as an apprentice in Metropolitan Hotel in Vancouver, British Columbia, Canada. After 3 years he moved to New York City to work at the "Daniel" by Chef Daniel Boulud. In 2003, Cherkas moved to Spain and worked as a cook-trainee in Michelin 3 star "Arzak" in San Sebastián, La Broche, 2 Michelin Stars in Madrid, Spain and elBulli in Roses, Spain.

In 2006, Cherkas moved to Malaysia, where he helmed restaurant "Lafite" in Shangri-La Hotel, Kuala Lumpur.

After two years being a pioneer in Molecular gastronomy in Kuala Lumpur, Cherkas was appointed as Chef de Cuisine of "Blu", the fine dining restaurant of Shangri-La Hotel Singapore. In 2011, Cherkas was invited to present at Madrid Fusion. He was also asked to be a keynote speaker at Food Hospitality Asia (2012) and World Gourmet Summit in 2010 and 2012.

In 2012, he left Shangri-la Hotels and together with his wife and partner Virginia Entizne opened his own restaurant called "Cuca" in Jimbaran, Bali in July 2013. They serve unique tapas, cocktails and desserts and their focus on local produce has awarded them the Snail of Approval certification by Slow Food.

In 2016, Cherkas was invited to present at Madrid Fusion Manila.

== Awards ==
- Confrérie de la Chaîne des Rôtisseurs National Competition- Silver medal in 2003
- Confrérie de la Chaîne des Rôtisseurs Regional Competition- Gold medal in 2003
- Bocuse d'Or: Canadian apprentice representative- 5th place in 2001
- USA Chicago Culinary Salon Team Canada member- Gold medal in 2001
- Karl Sheir apprentice Culinary Competition- Gold medal in 2001
- B.C. chefs Association Hot Culinary Competition- 3 Gold medals in 2000
- Vancouver Culinary Salon - 2 Gold medals in 1999
- Thomas J. Lipton Achievement Culinary Arts Scholarship in 1996
