= Kevin Hanson (disambiguation) =

Kevin Hanson may refer to:

- Kevin Hanson (musician), Guitarist for Woe, Is Me
- Kevin Hanson (basketball coach), Canadian basketball coach
