= SkyTrain (Vancouver) =

Rapid transit system in British Columbia

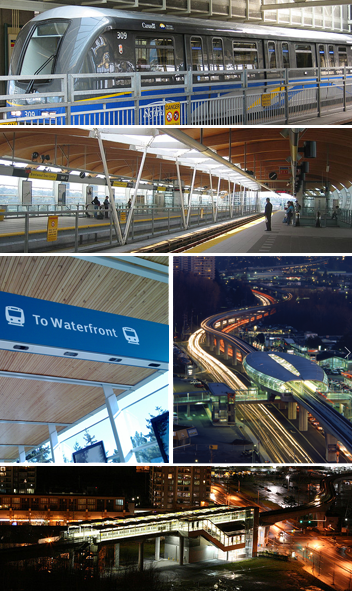

Overview
- Owner: Province of British Columbia
- Locale: Metro Vancouver, British Columbia
- Transit type: Medium-capacity rapid transit system
- Number of lines: 3
- Number of stations: 54 (13 under construction) (List of stations)
- Daily ridership: 450,400 (weekdays, Q2 2026)
- Annual ridership: 146,789,800 (2025)
- Website: TransLink

Operation
- Began operation: December 11, 1985; 40 years ago
- Operator: TransLink
- Character: Elevated, underground, and at-grade
- Number of vehicles: 298
- Train length: 2-, 4-, 5- or 6-car trainsets
- Headway: 2–10 minutes (Expo and Millennium Lines); 3–15 minutes (Canada Line)

Technical
- System length: 79.6 km (49.5 mi); 21.7 km (13.5 mi) under construction
- Track gauge: 1,435 mm (4 ft 8 1/2 in) standard gauge
- Electrification: 650 V DC third rail linear induction (Expo and Millennium Lines); 750 V DC third rail conventional traction motors (Canada Line)
- Average speed: 40 km/h (25 mph) (Expo and Millennium Lines); 32 km/h (20 mph) (Canada Line)
- Top speed: 80 km/h (50 mph)
System map
Key

SkyTrain is the medium-capacity rapid transit system serving the Metro Vancouver region in British Columbia, Canada. SkyTrain has 79.6 km (49.5 mi) of track and uses fully automated trains on grade-separated tracks running on underground and elevated guideways, allowing SkyTrain to hold consistently high on-time reliability. In 2025, the system had an annual ridership of 146,789,800, or about 450,400 per weekday as of the second quarter of 2026, making it the 7th busiest metro system in North America and the 5th busiest in Canada and the US.

The name "SkyTrain" was coined for the system during Expo 86 because the first line (Expo) principally runs on elevated guideway outside of Downtown Vancouver, providing panoramic views of the metropolitan area. It began operation in January 1986 as the world's first driverless urban rail system. SkyTrain uses the world's third-longest cable-supported transit-only bridge, known as SkyBridge, to cross the Fraser River.

With the opening of the Evergreen Extension on December 2, 2016, SkyTrain became the longest rapid transit system in Canada and the longest fully automated driverless system in the world. The total lengths of the automated lines of the Shanghai Metro, Singapore MRT, Kuala Lumpur Rapid KL, Dubai Metro and Riyadh Metro have since surpassed those of SkyTrain.

SkyTrain has 54 stations served by three lines: the Expo Line, the Millennium Line, and the Canada Line. The Expo and Millennium Lines are operated by British Columbia Rapid Transit Company under contract from TransLink (originally BC Transit), a regional government transportation agency. The Canada Line is operated on the same principles by the private concessionaire ProTrans BC under contract to TransLink and is an integrated part of the regional transport system. SkyTrain uses a fare system shared with other local transit services and is policed by the Metro Vancouver Transit Police who can enforce fares and write infraction tickets. SkyTrain attendants (STAs) provide first aid, emergency response, directions and customer service, monitor train faults, and operate the trains manually if necessary.

== Network ==
=== Expo Line ===
The Expo Line connects Waterfront station in Vancouver to King George station in Surrey, principally along a route established by the Westminster and Vancouver Tramway Company as an interurban line in 1890. The Expo Line (originally referred to as simply "SkyTrain" until the opening of the Millennium Line) was built in 1985 in time for Expo 86. It now has 24 stations. The Expo Line ran only as far as New Westminster station initially. In 1989, it was extended to Columbia station and in 1990, once the SkyBridge was finished, it continued across the Fraser River to Scott Road station in Surrey. In 1994, the terminus of the Expo Line became King George station in central Surrey. It was built on a budget of $854 million (1986 dollars). Effective October 22, 2016, Expo Line trains began operating on a new branch to Production Way–University station, taking over the previous Millennium Line service between Waterfront and that station. During peak periods, trains between Waterfront and Columbia arrive every 2 to 3 minutes. Between Waterfront and King George, trains arrive every 2 to 5 minutes during peak hours, while trains between Waterfront and Production Way arrive every 6 to 7 minutes in the peak hours.

=== Millennium Line ===
Prior to October 22, 2016, the Millennium Line shared tracks with the Expo Line from Waterfront station to Columbia station in New Westminster, then continued along its own elevated route through North Burnaby and East Vancouver, ending at VCC–Clark station, near Vancouver Community College's Broadway campus. It was built on a $1.2-billion budget and the final extension from Commercial Drive station (now Commercial–Broadway station) to VCC–Clark station was opened on January 6, 2006. From October 22, 2016, to December 1, 2016, the Millennium Line operated from VCC–Clark to Lougheed Town Centre station. As of December 2, 2016, the Millennium Line operates between VCC–Clark station in Vancouver and Lafarge Lake–Douglas station in Coquitlam. The Millennium Line has 17 stations, three of which are transfer stations with the Expo Line (Commercial–Broadway, Production Way–University, and Lougheed Town Centre) and two which connect with the West Coast Express commuter train (Moody Centre and Coquitlam Central). The original Millennium Line's stations were designed by British Columbia's top architects and are unlike those on the Expo Line. In 2004, Busby and Associates Architects, designers of the Brentwood Town Centre station in Burnaby, were honoured for their work with a Governor General's Medal in Architecture.

Construction on the Millennium Line's Evergreen Extension, from Lougheed Town Centre in Burnaby to Lafarge Lake–Douglas in Coquitlam, was completed in 2016 and it was opened for revenue service on December 2, 2016. This extension adds 11 km (6.8 mi) and 6 new stations to the Millennium Line.

=== Canada Line ===
The Canada Line begins at the Waterfront station hub, then continues south through Vancouver into the City of Richmond and Sea Island. From Bridgeport station, the Canada Line splits into two branches, one heading west to the YVR–Airport station at Vancouver International Airport and the other continuing south to the Richmond–Brighouse station in Richmond's city centre. Opened on August 17, 2009, the Canada Line added 15 stations and 19.2 km (11.9 mi) to the SkyTrain network. Waterfront station is the only station where the Canada Line directly connects with the Expo Line; however, Vancouver City Centre station is within a three-minute walk from Granville station via the Pacific Centre mall, making an unofficial transfer to the Expo Line. The Canada Line cost $1.9 billion, financed by the Governments of Canada and British Columbia, TransLink, and InTransitBC. The Canada Line's trains, built by Hyundai Rotem, are fully automated, but are of a different design from the Expo and Millennium Lines' Bombardier-built fleet. They use conventional electric motors rather than linear induction motor technology. Canada Line tracks do not interconnect with the rest of the SkyTrain network, and there is a separate fleet maintenance depot.

== Operations ==
Line	Opening year	Route length	Stations	Terminus stations		Travel time	Frequency		Combined frequency	
Line	Opening year	Route length	Stations	Terminus stations		Travel time	Peak	Off-peak	Peak	Off-peak
Expo Line	1985	28.9 km (18.0 mi) (Note: Expo Line service is interlined for 16 stations, accounting for 22.2 km (13.8 mi) of route, between Waterfront and Columbia.)	20	Waterfront	King George	40 min	2–5 min	6–10 min	2–3 min (Note: Additional peak hour only service operates between Waterfront and Commercial–Broadway.)	3–5 min
Expo Line	2016	29.7 km (18.5 mi) (Note: Expo and Millennium Line service is interlined for two stations, accounting for 1.8 km (1.1 mi) of route, between Lougheed Town Centre and Production Way–University.)	20	Waterfront	Production Way–University	41 min	12 min	12 min	2–3 min	3–5 min
Expo Line	2024 (Note: Temporary service change due to single tracking between Braid and Lougheed Town Centre for the construction of a future storage yard. Passengers can transfer at Braid to a Production Way-University bound train.)	25.9 km (16.1 mi)	18	Waterfront	Braid	36 min	12 min	—	—	—
Millennium Line	2002 (Note: Evergreen Extension started revenue service on December 2, 2016.)	25.5 km (15.8 mi)	17	VCC–Clark	Lafarge Lake–Douglas	36 min	3–4 min	6–10 min	—	—
Canada Line	2009	14.4 km (8.9 mi) (Note: Canada Line service is interlined for 10 stations, accounting for 11.1 km (6.9 mi) of route, between Waterfront and Bridgeport.)	14	Waterfront	Richmond–Brighouse	25 min	6 min	6–15 min	3 min	3–8 min
Canada Line	2009	15.1 km (9.4 mi)	13	Waterfront	YVR–Airport	26 min	6 min	6–15 min	3 min	3–8 min

=== Frequency ===
SkyTrain provides high-frequency service, with trains arriving every 2 to 6 minutes at all stations during peak hours. Trains operate between 5:07 a.m. and approximately 1:55 a.m. on weekdays, with reduced hours on weekends on the Expo and Millennium lines. The last eastbound trains leave the downtown terminus between approximately 12:40 a.m to 1:15 a.m on weekdays. SkyTrain has longer hours of service during special events, such as New Year's Eve, the Vancouver 2010 Olympics, and marathons.

Cash fares as of July 1, 2026
Fare class	One zone	Two zones	Three zones	Airport AddFare
Adult (cash)	$3.50	$5.10	$6.70	+$6.50
Adult (stored value)	$2.85	$4.20	$5.40	+$6.50
Concession (cash)	$2.30	$3.40	$4.60	+$6.50

=== Fares ===
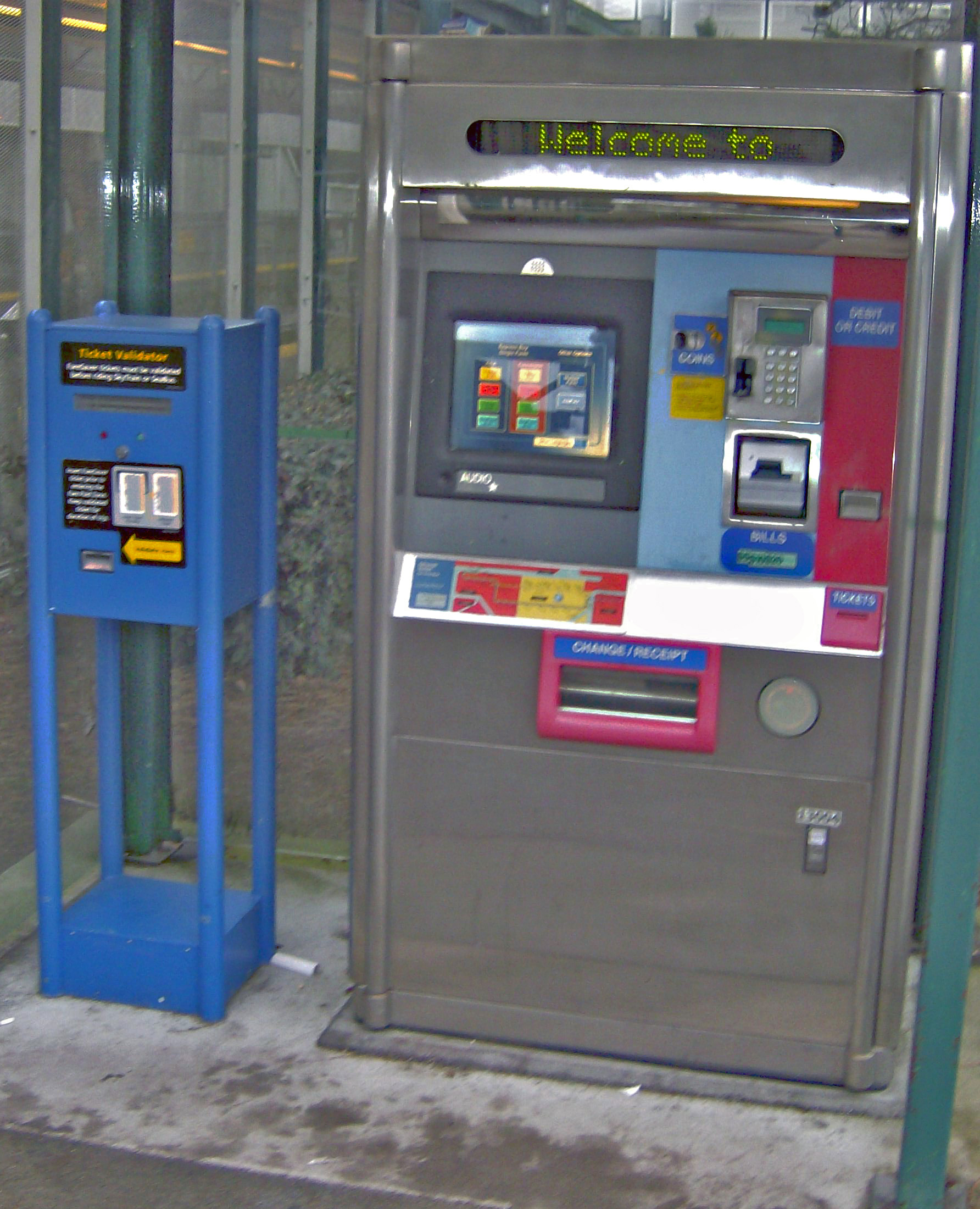
A ticket vending machine (right), next to an old faresaver validator (2006)

TransLink's SkyTrain service area is divided into three zones, with fares varying depending on how many zone boundaries are crossed during one trip (two- and three-zone passengers are charged the one zone rate after 6:30 pm rush hour, and on weekends and statutory holidays). Customers may purchase fares using cash, debit cards, or credit cards from self-serve ticket vending machines at the mezzanine level of each station. A variety of transit passes are available, such as the pre-paid FareSaver ticket, daily DayPass, monthly FareCard, annual EmployerPass, post-secondary student U-Pass, and other specialized passes. Canadian National Institute for the Blind identification cards are accepted without the need to be read by the fare box. One-time fares are valid for 90 minutes on any mode of transportation with any number of transfers, including all SkyTrain lines and bus and SeaBus routes. Concession fares are available for youth aged 13 to 18, seniors 65 and older, and HandyCard holders. Children under 12 have been able to ride the system for free since September 2021.

Until April 2016, SkyTrain's fare system was a proof-of-payment system; there were no turnstiles at the entrances to train platforms. Instead, fares were typically enforced by random ticket inspections – usually by police or transit security but occasionally by SkyTrain attendants – through trains and stations. This was supplemented by controlled access – with the payment of a fare or proof of payment required to pass through a staffed gate – at special events where extremely high ridership was expected, such as immediately after BC Lions or Vancouver Canucks games.

==== Fare gates ====
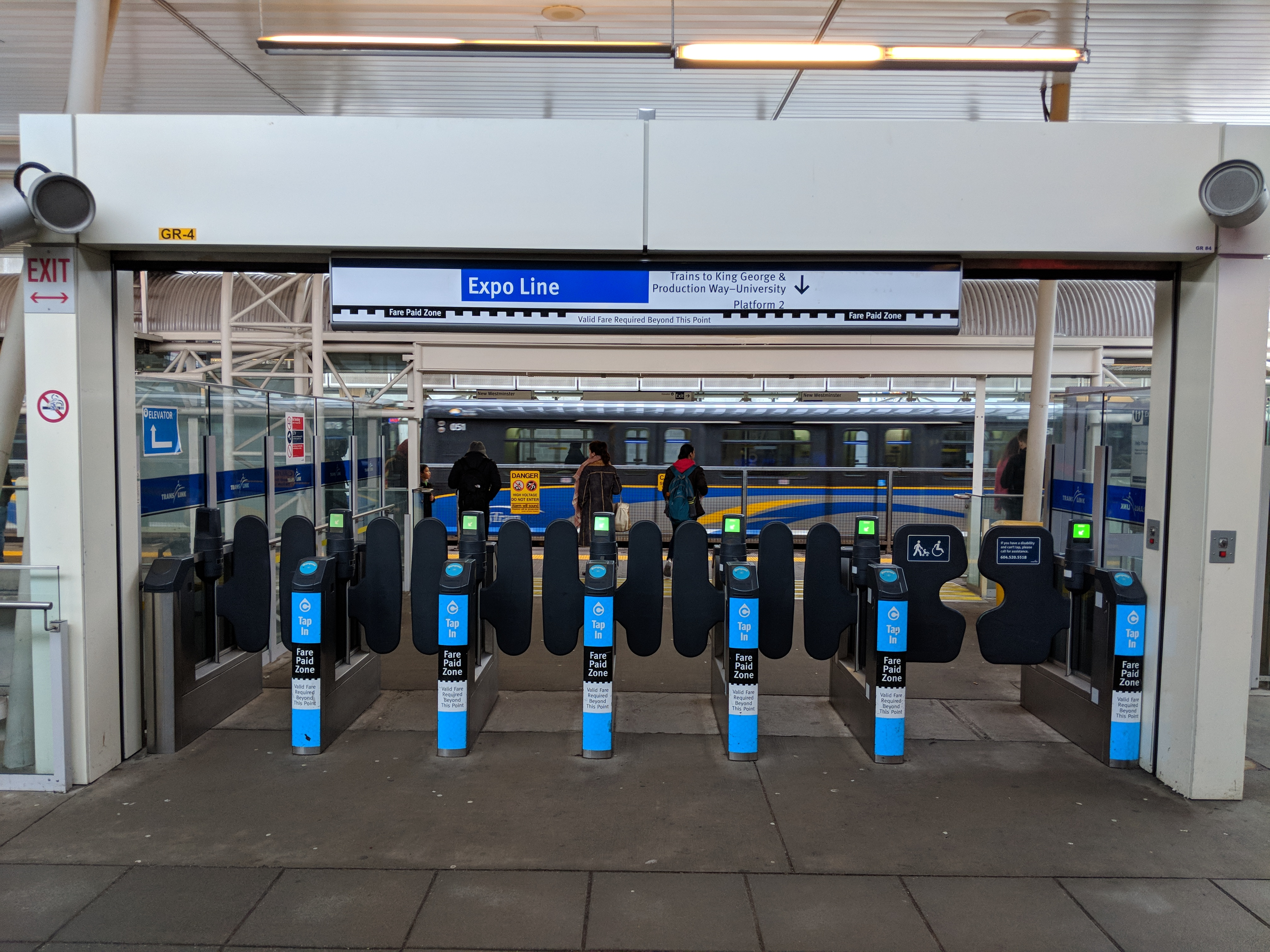
Fare gates at New Westminster station (2018)

Installing faregates to prevent fare evasion was considered as early as at the time of the system's opening, but was rejected multiple times because the expense of implementing, maintaining, and enforcing them would exceed the losses prevented. In 2005, TransLink estimated it was losing $4 million (5 percent of revenue attributed to SkyTrain) annually to fare evasion on SkyTrain. While the Canada Line stations, along with those on the Millennium Line, were designed to allow for future fare gates, the Canada Line opened in 2009 without them, despite stated intentions to include them. Expo Line stations have since been redesigned and retrofitted to accommodate the new fare gate system.

The 2008 Provincial Transit Plan outlined several SkyTrain system upgrades, including replacement of the proof-of-payment system with a gated-ticket system. According to Minister of Transportation Kevin Falcon, the gated-ticket system was to be implemented by a private company by 2010. In April 2009, it was announced that the provincial and federal governments would spend $100 million to put the gates in place by the end of 2010. However, in August 2009, a TransLink spokesman said the gates would not be installed before 2012, and that a smart card system would be implemented at the same time.

It was announced on August 14, 2013, that bus-issued transfers (magnetic strip paper cards) would continue to be issued for cash fares paid on buses, but that these transfers would not work at SkyTrain or SeaBus station fare gates, which require a Compass Card or a 90-minute paper Compass ticket to operate. This means that a bus rider paying cash is required to pay a second fare to transfer to SkyTrain or SeaBus. Those transit users paying cash but beginning their trips at a SkyTrain or SeaBus station are not subject to this second fare because they are issued Compass tickets which are accepted as valid transfers on TransLink buses.

Construction of SkyTrain fare gates was completed in May 2014, but they remained open until April 2016 owing to multiple system problems. While open for the nearly two-year period, holders of paper-based monthly passes, bus-issued transfers, and FareSaver tickets continued to pass through the gates into the stations' fare-paid zones unimpeded, although they were subject to having their fare inspected by transit security or transit police once inside the fare-paid zone. Starting in April 2016, they were initially fully closed only during peak hours, with one gate remaining open during off-peak times for people with accessibility issues who could not reach their Compass Cards to the fare gates to tap in or out. Full implementation of the fare gates was also delayed by problems with Compass Cards when riders were tapping out as they exited buses. The tapping-out process on buses was too slow and did not always record the tap which—because the system initially deducted a three-zone fare until a tap-out was recorded and a refund was issued to those having only travelled one or two zones—often resulted in customers being charged for travelling through three zones when in fact they had only travelled through one or two. This was a serious setback for TransLink as the entire system was supposed to be operational by 2013. A solution was finally implemented where the requirement to tap out of buses was removed and all bus travel was considered as within a single zone, creating significant savings for those travelling multiple zones using buses only and in some cases changing transit usage patterns. The last fare gates left open for users with accessibility issues were closed on July 25, 2016, and the system has been in full operation since.

==== Airport surcharge ====
Travel on the Canada Line is free between the three Sea Island stations near the Vancouver International Airport: Templeton, Sea Island Centre, and YVR–Airport.

Single-use Compass tickets purchased with cash at Compass vending machines in stations on Sea Island include a surcharge, the "YVR AddFare", of $6.50 on top of the normal fare. This charge is also added to trips initiated at Sea Island stations for travel east to Bridgeport station and beyond using Compass Card stored value or DayPasses. It is not applied to trips using monthly passes, nor to trips travelling to the airport using DayPasses or single-use Compass tickets which were purchased and activated off Sea Island. The YVR AddFare came into effect on January 18, 2010. The revenue collected from the AddFare goes back to TransLink.

=== Ridership ===
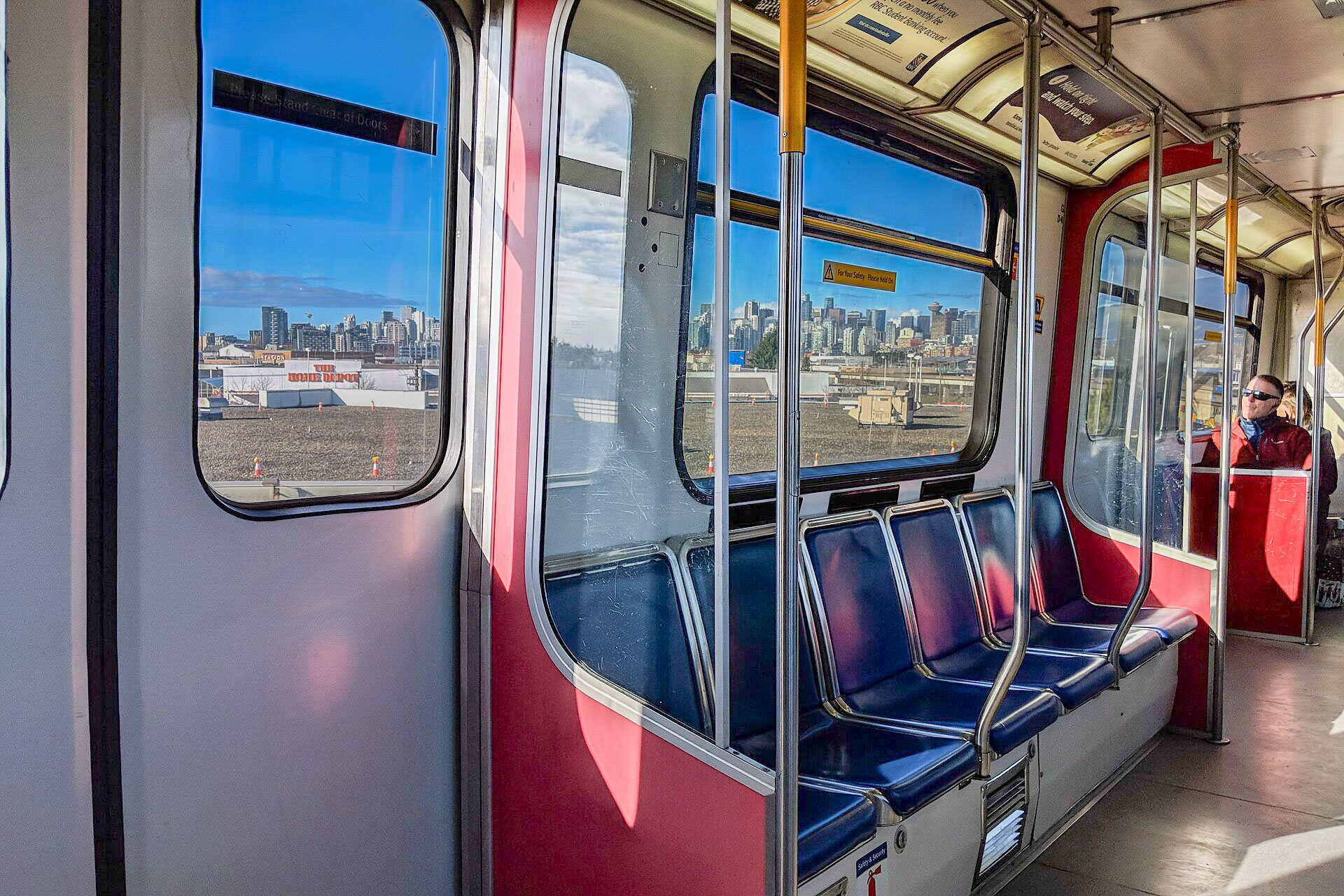
Interior of a Mark I train travelling along the Expo Line between Commercial–Broadway station and Main Street–Science World station (2019)

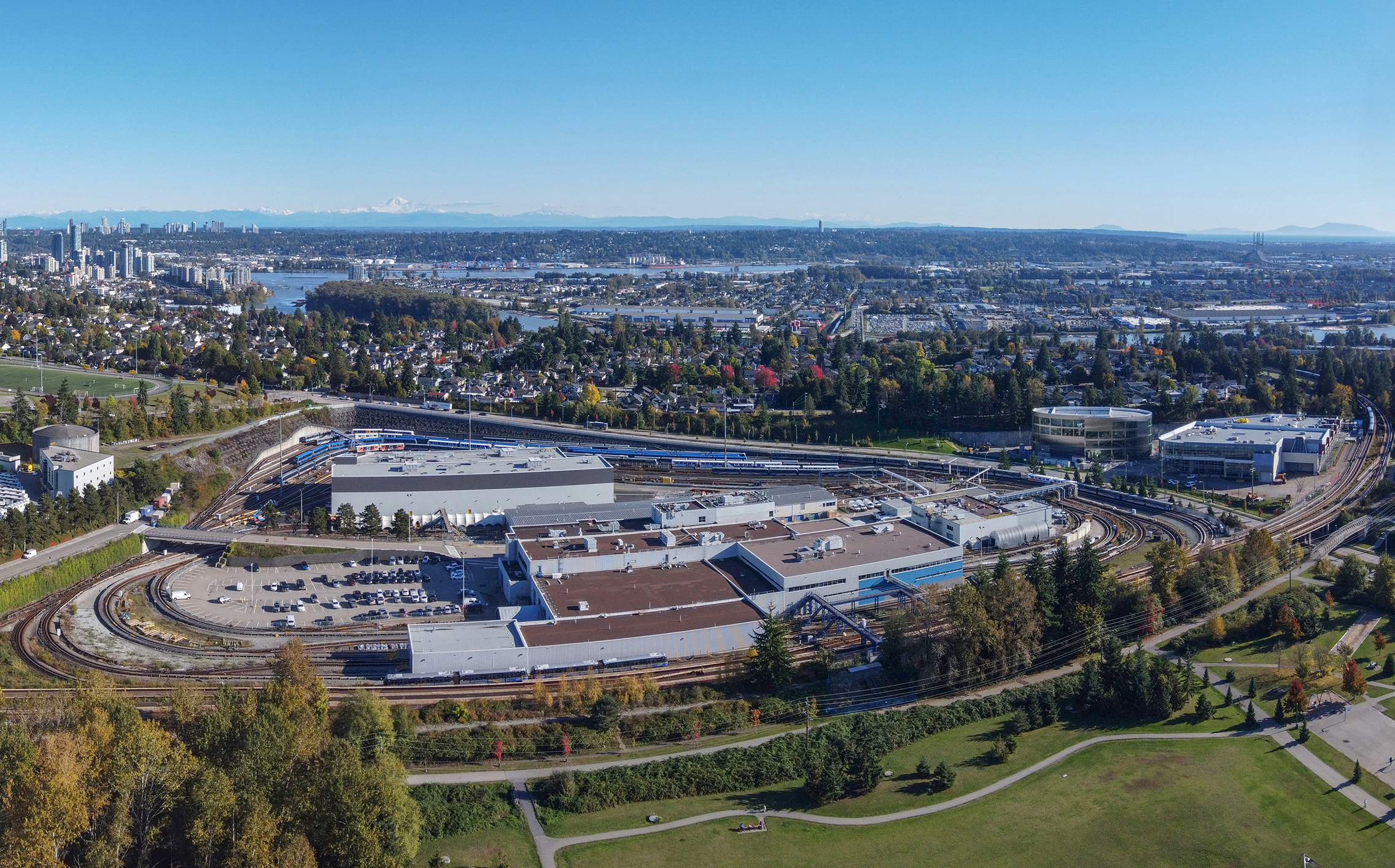
BC Rapid Transit Company depot in Burnaby

Passengers on SkyTrain made an average of 526,400 trips on weekdays by the end of September 2019. Overall in 2017, the network carried a total of 151 million passengers. This compares to 117.4 million passengers in 2010: 38,447,725 on the Canada Line and 78,965,214 on the interlined Expo and Millennium Lines. The Canada Line carried an average of 110,000 passengers per weekday in early 2011, and is three years ahead of ridership forecasts.

SkyTrain's highest ridership came during the 2010 Winter Olympics when each event ticket included unlimited day-of transit usage. During the 17-day event, Canada Line ridership rose 110 percent to an average of 228,000 per day, with a single-day record of 287,400 on February 19, 2010. Expo and Millennium Line ridership rose 64 percent to an average of 394,000 per day, with a single-day record of 567,000 on February 20, 2010. At times, every available train was in service on all three lines. After the Olympics ended, overall transit usage remained 7.8 percent above the previous year.

TransLink SkyTrain ridership by year
Year	2016	2017	2018	2019	2020	2021	2022	2023	2024
Trips (millions)	137.4	151.4	160.0	165.1	74.5 (Note: Represents a significant ridership decrease from pre-2020 period owing to the impact of the COVID-19 pandemic on public transport.)	76.32	116.6	141.3	149.1
View chart definition.

TransLink ridership by mode, 2024
Mode	Trips	% of total	View chart definition.
SkyTrain	149,066,500	37.00	View chart definition.
West Coast Express	1,559,100	0.39	View chart definition.
SeaBus	5,398,900	1.34	View chart definition.
Bus	246,877,500	61.30	View chart definition.
Total	402,902,000 (Note: Represents a significant ridership decrease compared to pre-2020 levels owing to the impact of the COVID-19 pandemic on public transport.)	100.00	View chart definition.

=== Funding ===
The cost of operating SkyTrain in 2008, with an estimated 73.5 million boardings, was $83 million. To cover this, TransLink draws mostly from transit fares, advertising ($360 million in 2008) and tax ($262 million from fuel taxes and $298 million from property taxes in 2008), funds which are also shared with bus services, roads and bridge maintenance, and other infrastructure and services. The capital costs of building the system are shared with other government agencies. Capital expenses were $216 million in 2008. For example, the cost of building the Canada Line was shared between TransLink ($335 million or 22 percent), the federal government (29 percent), the provincial government (28 percent), the airport authority (19 percent), and the City of Vancouver (2 percent). While TransLink has run surpluses for operating costs since 2001, it incurs debt to cover these capital costs. As a whole, TransLink had $1.1 billion in long-term debt in 2006, of which $508 million was transferred from the province in 1999 when responsibility for SkyTrain was given to TransLink. The province retained ownership of the causeway, bridge, certain services, and a portion of SkyTrain's debt.

=== Security ===
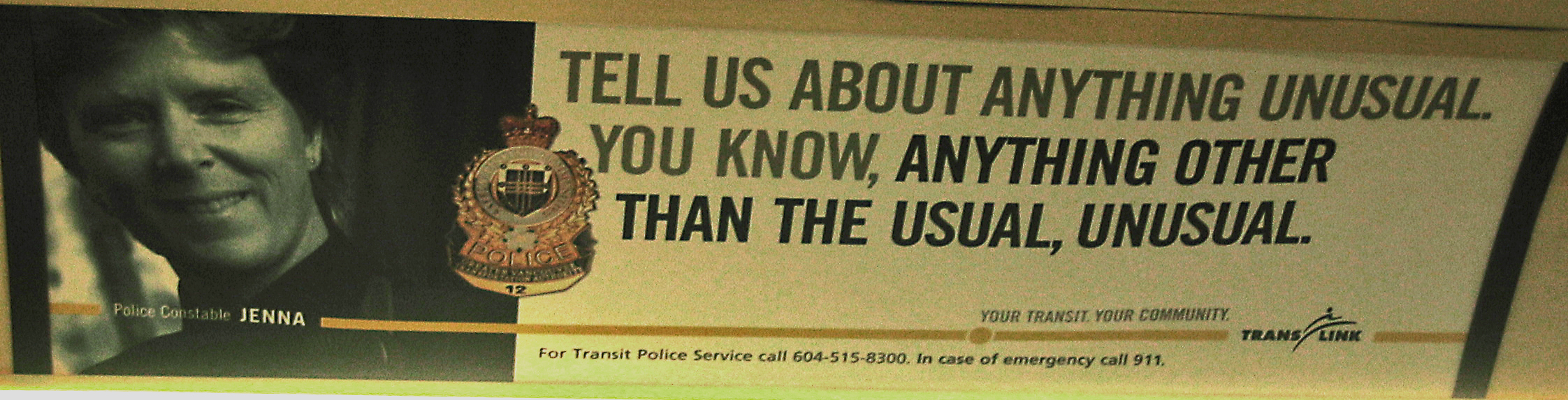
Bus advertisement for the Metro Vancouver Transit Police (2007)

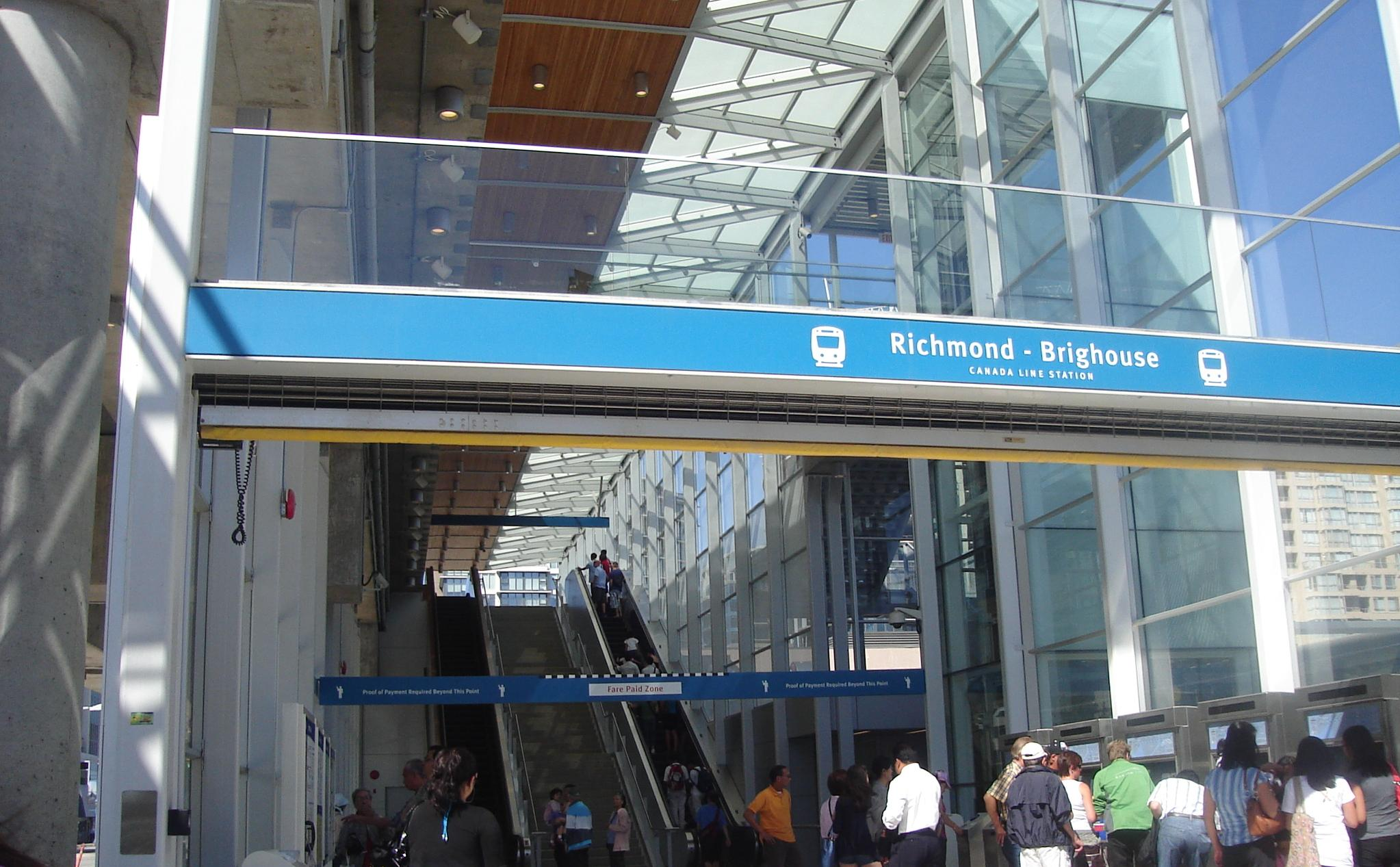
Canada and Millennium Line stations were designed for fare gates (2009).

Law enforcement services are provided by the Metro Vancouver Transit Police (MVTP). They replaced the old TransLink special provincial constables, who had limited authority.

On December 4, 2005, MVTP officers became the first and only transit police force in Canada to have full police powers and carry firearms. There was public concern in March 2005 when it was announced that transit police would carry firearms. Solicitor General of British Columbia John Les defended the move at the time, saying that it was necessary to enhance SkyTrain security. Transit officers receive the same training as officers in municipal and RCMP forces. They may arrest people for outstanding warrants, enforce drug laws, enforce the criminal code beyond TransLink property, and deal with offences that begin off TransLink property and make their way onto it. They issue tickets for fare evasion and other infractions on SkyTrain, transit buses, SeaBus, and West Coast Express.

Transit police officers and Transit Security officers inspect fares at Skytrain stations as part of TransLink's fare audit. Transit Security officers mostly focus their efforts on the bus system, bus loops, and SeaBus.

SkyTrain attendants provide customer service and first aid, troubleshoot train and station operations, and perform fare checks alongside the transit police force. SkyTrain attendants can be identified by their uniforms which say "SkyTrain" on them.

Over the years, violence and other criminal activities have been concerns at time, but TransLink maintains that the system is safe. In 2009, Inspector Kash Heed of the Vancouver Police Department said that little crime takes place in the stations themselves; however, criminal activity becomes more visible 400–700 metres (1,000–2,000 ft) outside them.

Each station is monitored with an average of 23 closed-circuit television cameras, allowing SkyTrain operators to monitor passenger and station activity. Designated waiting areas have enhanced lighting, benches, and emergency telephones. Trains have yellow strips above each window which, when pressed, silently alert operators of a security hazard. On-board speaker phones provide two-way communication between passengers and control operators.

In 2007, it was reported that the entire surveillance system was upgraded from analogue two-hour tape recording to digital technology, which was to allow police to retrieve previous footage for up to seven days. However, incidents since the upgrade have still limited police to a two-hour loop, resulting in loss of potential evidence.

By November 2008, at least 54 deaths had occurred on the platforms and tracks of the Expo and Millennium Lines. 44 of those deaths were suicides, while the remaining ten were accidental.

== History ==
A plaque commemorating the inauguration of the SkyTrain

=== Planning ===
Vancouver had plans as early as the 1950s to build a monorail system, with modernist architect Wells Coates to design it; that project was abandoned. The lack of a rapid transit system was said to be the cause of traffic problems in the 1970s, and the municipal government could not fund the construction of such a system. During the same period, Urban Transportation Development Corporation, then an Ontario crown corporation, was developing a new rapid transit technology known as an "Intermediate Capacity Transit System". In 1980, the "Advanced Light Rapid Transit" system was selected by the British Columbia provincial government for use on one of two planned corridors, connecting Vancouver to New Westminster in time for Expo 86.

=== Expo Line history ===
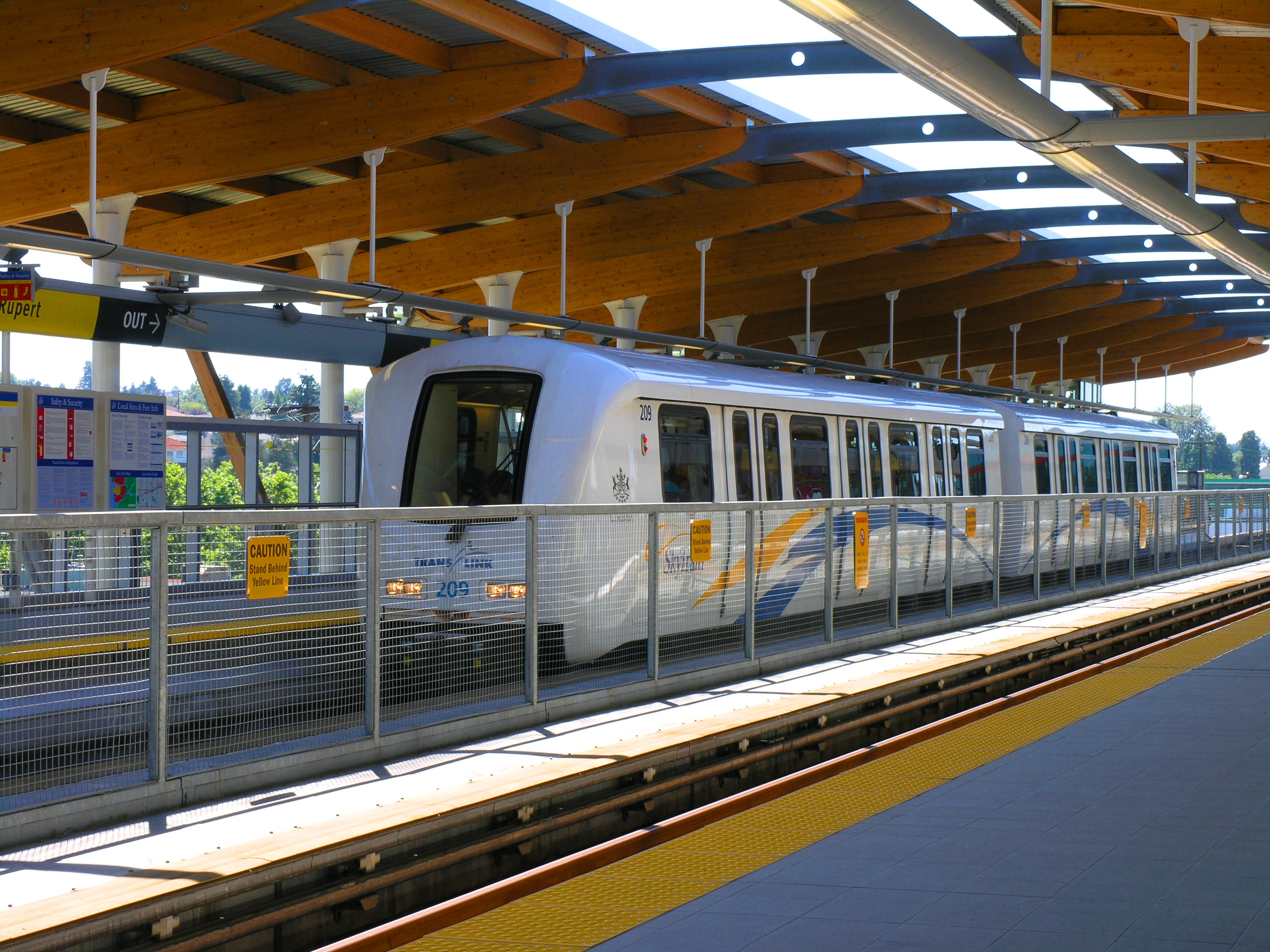
A first-generation Bombardier Mark II train at Rupert station (2005)

SkyTrain was conceived as a legacy project of Expo 86 and the first line was finished in time to showcase the fair's theme: "Transportation and Communication: World in Motion – World in Touch". Construction was funded by the provincial and federal governments and began in March 1982. It was built through the Dunsmuir Tunnel under downtown, which had originally been built for the Canadian Pacific Railway, to save costs.

The first 21.4 kilometres (13.3 mi) of the system, from Waterfront to New Westminster station, opened for limited and fare-free service on December 11, 1985. Revenue service began on January 3, 1986, and within its first year the line had carried over 30 million passengers—including visitors to Expo 86. The following year, construction began on an extension including the SkyBridge, Columbia station, and Scott Road station, extending service by 3.1 kilometres (1.9 mi) to Surrey; it opened on March 16, 1990. The line was expanded again in 1994 with the opening of Gateway, Surrey Central, and King George stations. SkyTrain is part of the 1996 Greater Vancouver Regional District's (GVRD) Livable Region Strategic Plan, which discusses strategies to deal with the anticipated increase of population in the region. These strategies include increasing transportation choices and transit use.

=== Millennium Line history ===
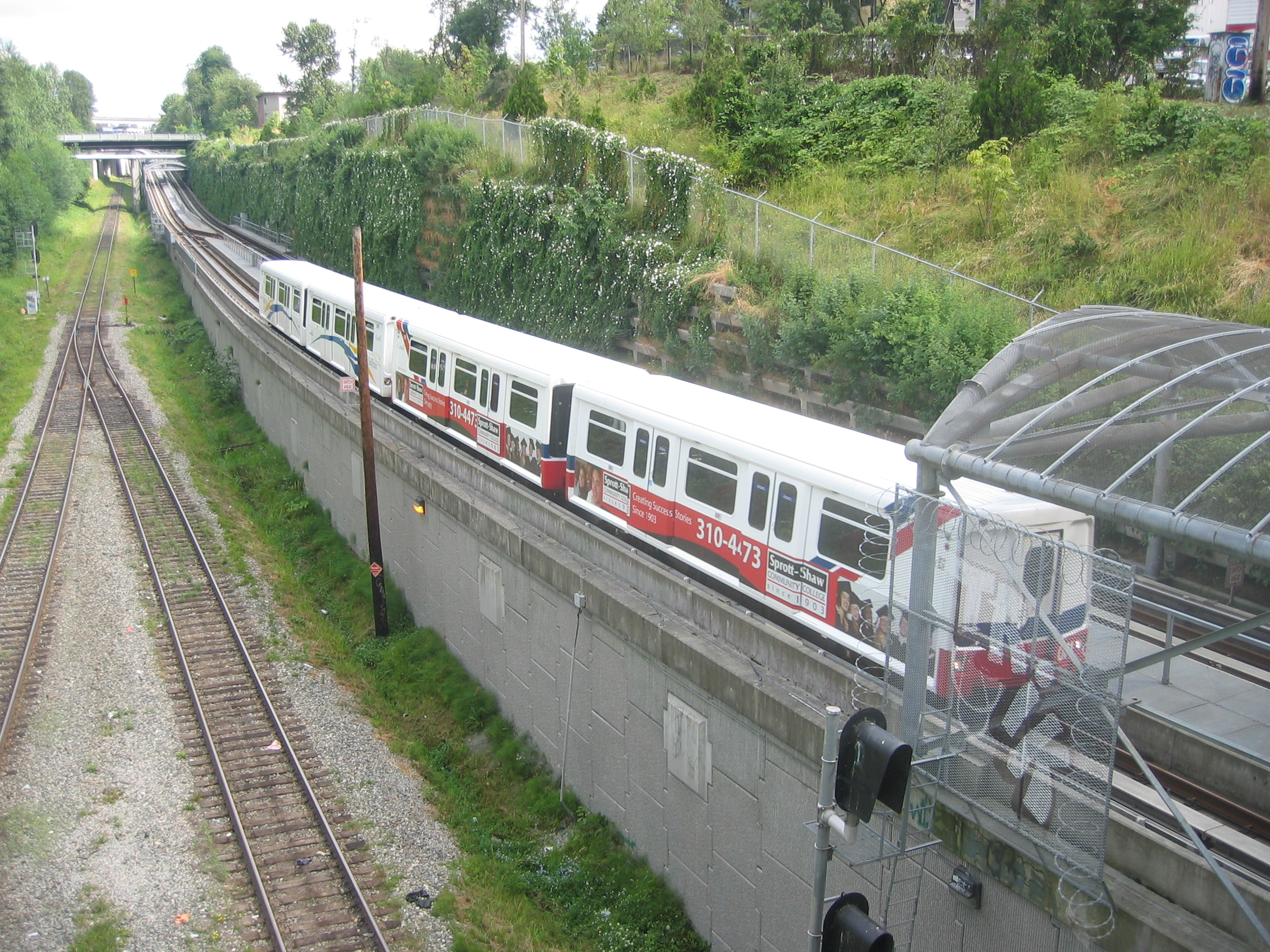
A Mark I train in the Grandview Cut between VCC–Clark and Commercial–Broadway stations (2006)

The first section of the Millennium Line opened in 2002, with Braid and Sapperton stations. Most of the remaining portion began operating later that year, serving North Burnaby and East Vancouver. Phase I of the Millennium Line was completed $50 million under budget. Critics of the project dubbed it the "SkyTrain to Nowhere", claiming that the route of the new line was based on political concerns, not the needs of commuters. One illustration of the legitimacy of this complaint is that the end of the Millennium Line is located in a vacant field, chosen because it was supposed to be the location for a new high-tech development and is close to the head office of QLT Inc., but additional development was slow to get off the ground. That station, VCC–Clark near Clark Drive and Broadway, did not open until 2006 due to the struggles of negotiating the right-of-way with BNSF, the owner of the freight tracks beside the station, but it is still five kilometres short of the original proposed Phase II terminus at Granville Street and 10th Avenue. At the time VCC–Clark station opened, it was revealed that the additional westward extension and its three stations was out of favour and "not a high priority anymore".

==== Evergreen Extension ====
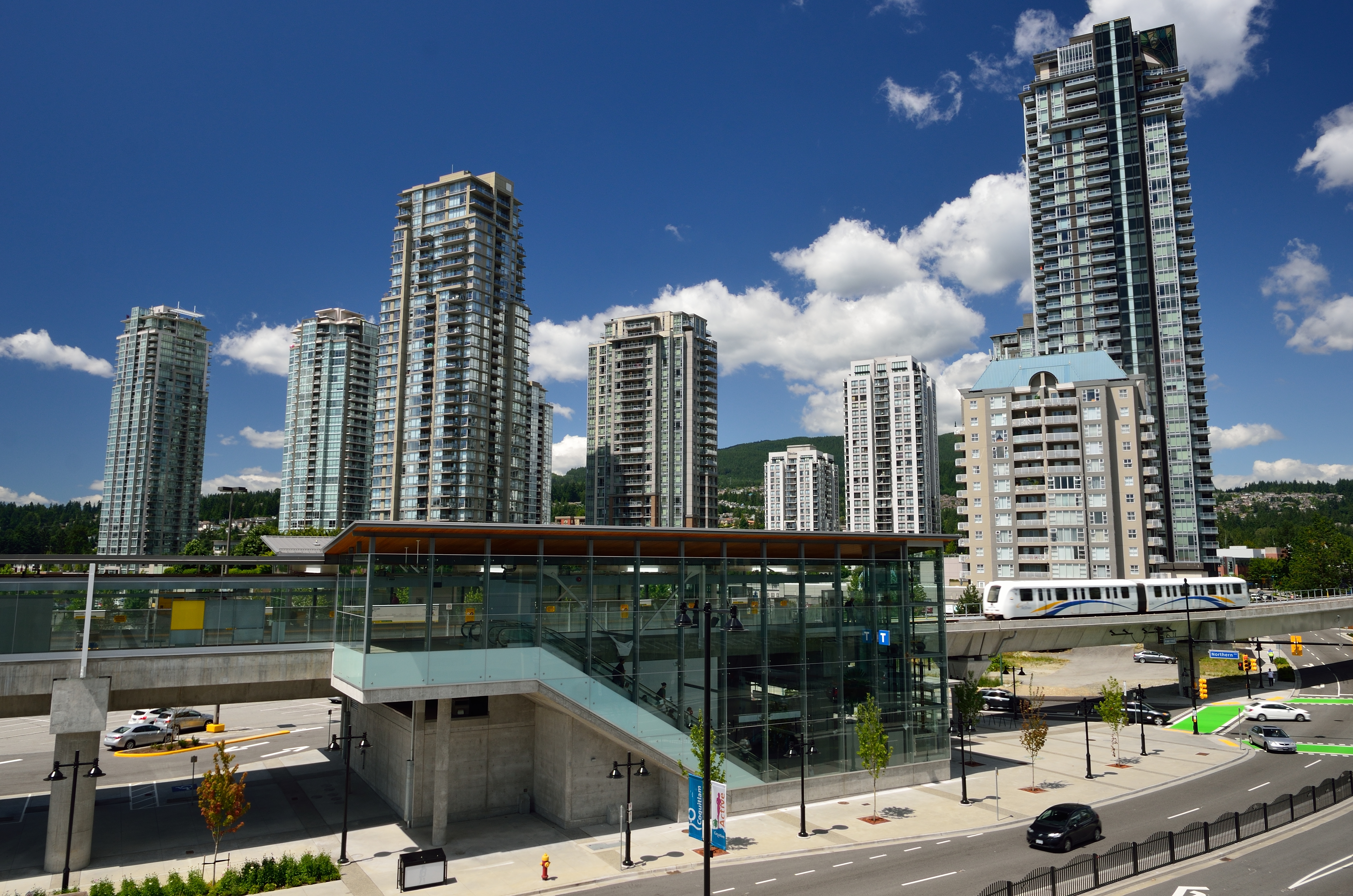
Coquitlam's Lincoln station on the Evergreen Extension of the Millennium Line (2017)

The Evergreen Extension, known as the Evergreen Line during construction, is the second phase of the Millennium Line, extending from Lougheed Mall in Burnaby to the Douglas College campus in Coquitlam. Originally referred to as the Port Moody-Coquitlam (PMC) Line, it provides a "one-seat ride" from Coquitlam to Vancouver. Switches to the PMC Line were installed to the east of Lougheed Town Centre station during its initial construction and a third platform at the station was roughed-in in anticipation of the extension. Phase II was postponed following a change in provincial government and a shuffling of priorities that led to prioritizing building the Canada Line due to Vancouver's hosting of the 2010 Olympics. Preliminary construction of the Evergreen Extension began in July 2012 and major construction started in June 2013 with the construction of support columns for the line. The extension began revenue service on December 2, 2016.

=== Canada Line history ===
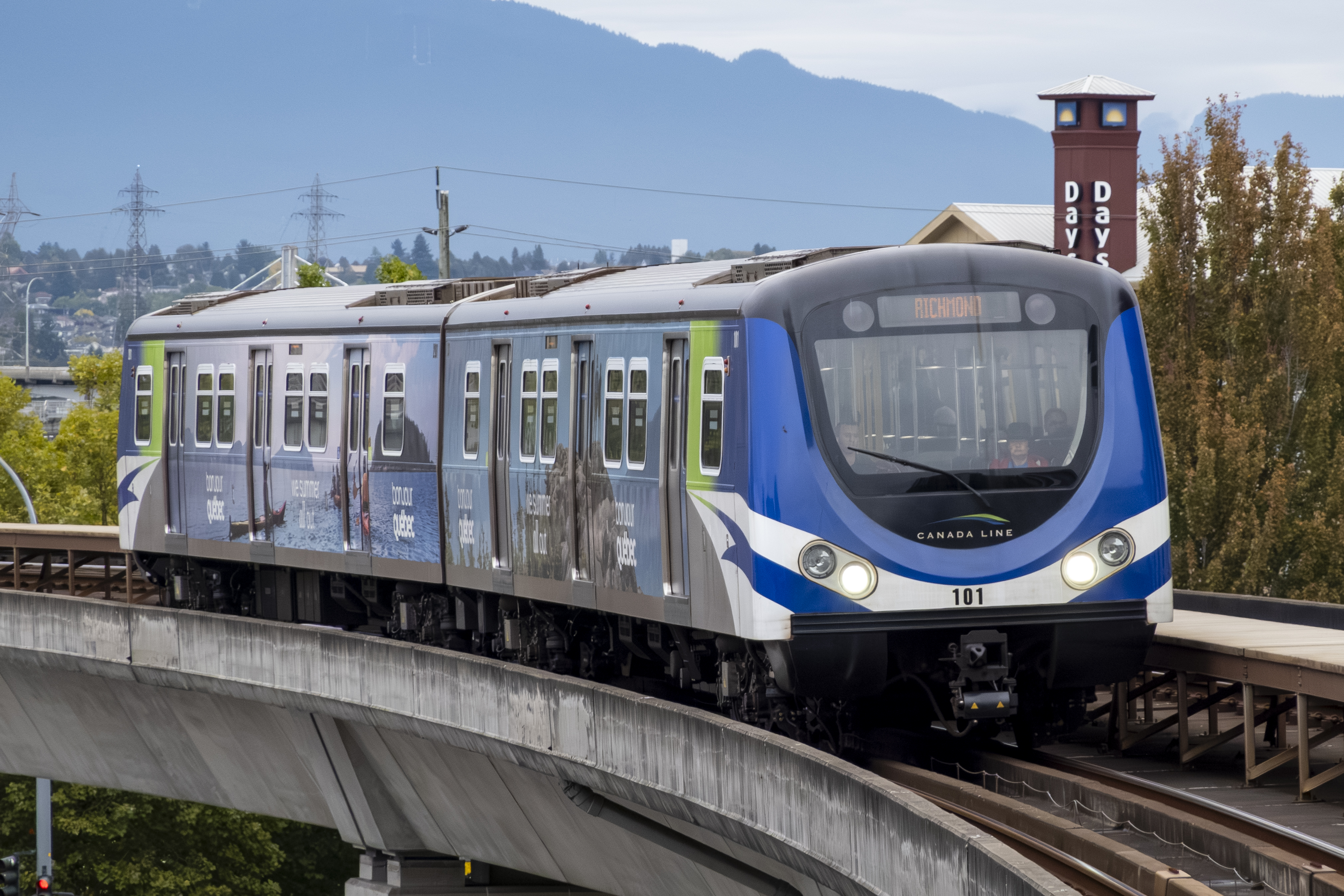
A Canada Line train pulling into Capstan station

The Canada Line was built as a public–private partnership, with the winning consortium (now known as ProTransBC), led by SNC-Lavalin, contributing funds toward its construction and operating it for 35 years. A minimum ridership was guaranteed to ProTransBC by TransLink. The Richmond–Vancouver corridor had been considered for a rapid transit line as early as 1979 but such a project was not funded until the early 2000s with the approval of the Canada Line. The line opened on August 17, 2009, 15 weeks ahead of schedule and on budget. Ridership rose three years ahead of forecasts, hitting 100,000 passengers per weekday in May 2010 and 136,000 passengers per weekday in June 2011. The Canada Line is operationally independent from the other SkyTrain lines, using different rolling stock (shorter overall train and station length, but wider cars) that is incompatible with the Expo and Millennium Lines.

=== Impact ===
SkyTrain has had a significant impact on the development of areas near stations, and has helped to shape urban density in Metro Vancouver. Between 1991 and 2001, the population living within 500 m (1,640 ft) of SkyTrain increased by 37 percent, compared to the regional average of 24 percent. Since SkyTrain opened, the total population of the service area rose from 400,000 to 1.3 million people. According to BC Transit's document SkyTrain: A catalyst for development, more than $5 billion of private money had been invested within a 10–15 minute walking distance of the SkyTrain and SeaBus. The report claimed that the two modes of transportation were the driving force of the investment, though it did not disaggregate the general growth in that area.

== Design ==
=== Routes ===
A schematic diagram of the SkyTrain network as of late 2020

There are three main routes: the Expo Line, Millennium Line and Canada Line. The Expo Line travels between Waterfront station in Downtown Vancouver and Columbia station in New Westminster, serving the cities of Vancouver, Burnaby, and New Westminster. From Columbia, the Expo Line splits into two branches. One branch travels through Surrey to King George station, while the other travels through New Westminster and Burnaby, terminating at Production Way–University station.

Millennium Line trains travel between VCC–Clark station and Lafarge Lake–Douglas station in the city of Coquitlam. Near the western end of the line is a major transfer point with the Expo Line at Commercial–Broadway station. Further east, Lougheed Town Centre station and Production Way–University station serve as two more transfer points with the Expo Line.

The Canada Line travels southward from Waterfront station in Downtown Vancouver to Richmond, where the track splits at Bridgeport station; trains alternate between a southern branch ending at Richmond–Brighouse station and a western branch ending at Vancouver International Airport.

Although most of the system is elevated, SkyTrain runs at or below grade through Downtown Vancouver, for the Vancouver portion of the Canada Line until just before it reaches Richmond at Marine Drive station, through the 2.1-kilometre (1.3 mi) tunnel used by the Millennium Line between Coquitlam and Port Moody, through the 0.6-kilometre (0.4 mi) tunnel between Columbia and Sapperton stations in New Westminster, and for short stretches in Burnaby and New Westminster.

SkyTrain's Expo Line uses the world's second longest bridge dedicated to transit services, the SkyBridge, which crosses the Fraser River between New Westminster and Surrey. It is a 616-metre-long (2021 ft) cable-stayed bridge, with 123-metre-tall (404 ft) towers. Two additional transit-only bridges, the North Arm Bridge and the Middle Arm Bridge, were built for the Canada Line. The North Arm Bridge is an extradosed bridge with a total length of 562 m (1844 ft), with shorter 47-metre (154 ft) towers necessitated by its proximity to the Vancouver International Airport, and also has a pedestrian/bicycle deck connecting the bicycle networks of Vancouver and Richmond. The Middle Arm Bridge is a shorter box girder bridge.

=== Technology ===
The signalling technology used on all three SkyTrain lines to run trains automatically was originally developed by Alcatel and loaded from a 3.5" diskette. There were initially four systems called the vehicle control computer (VCC) with three divided over the mainline and one for the storage yard. VCC1 controls trains from Waterfront to Royal Oak; VCC2 controls trains from Royal Oak to King George (it now also controls a portion of the Millennium Line); and VCC3 controls trains in the yard. Additional VCCs were added as Skytrain expanded. Each VCC is a cluster of three IBM Type 7588 rack-mount single-board computers with Intel-IA32 Pentium processors and proprietary hardware in a fault-tolerant configuration. For example, VCC3 is composed of CPU1, CPU2, and CPU3. For every command that is sent to a train, at least two of the CPUs must agree with the action, otherwise an error is generated and the command is ignored. The VCC communicates with the train's vehicle on board computer (VOBC), whose data is transmitted through coax cables laid along the tracks. There are up to two VOBCs per married-pair trains, i.e. 4-car train would have two VOBCs. If the VCCs fail or communication between the VCC and the VOBC is lost, the train will "time-out" and emergency-brake (EB) through a Quester Tangent brake assurance monitor (BAM) that controls propulsion and braking systems. The VCCs have a command-line-console, but normally the trains are controlled through a system known as the SMC, which also provides scheduling. All commands from the SMC are verified to be safe by the VCC before execution. However if the SMC fails, the system can still be operated through the VCC. This is known as "degraded mode". The SkyTrain health monitoring unit (HMU) developed by Quester Tangent provides monitoring and diagnostic functionality for vehicle maintenance by connecting to CAN vehicle network and providing a maintenance display in the Hostler Panel.

SkyTrain's signalling system later provided the basis of SelTrac, which is currently maintained and sold by Thales and has equipped many lines around the world. Largely as a result of this, the Expo and Millennium Lines have a combined punctuality record of over 96 percent; the principal cause of train delays is passenger interference with train doors. There have been two derailments during revenue service in the system's history.

=== Accessibility ===
The SkyTrain network is fully mobility-needs accessible, including vehicles and stations. Mark I train cars have one designated wheelchair position, Mark II, Mark III and Hyundai Rotem cars have two, and all stations have elevators. TransLink upgraded all Expo Line platform station edges to match those on the Millennium Line shortly after it was completed. The new, wider edges are brighter and are tiled to provide a safer environment for the visually impaired. The Canada Line also uses this safety feature in its stations. Since the opening of the Millennium Line, aside from platform tile upgrading, many Expo line stations have also been refitted with new signage and ticket vending machines. Accessibility is provided for deaf individuals through real-time English signage and displays at stations and on newer trains, although a reliance on verbal communication for service disruptions has been identified as a transportation barrier.

The distinctive three-tone chime used in the SkyTrain system was recorded in 1984–85 at Little Mountain Sound Studios in Vancouver. The automated train announcements have been voiced by Laureen Regan since the opening of the Millennium Line in 2002, and by Karen Kelm between 1985 and 2001.

== Rolling stock ==
=== Expo and Millennium Line stock ===
The Expo Line and Millennium Line use Alstom's Innovia Metro system, a system of automated trains driven by linear induction motors, formerly known as Intermediate Capacity Transit System (ICTS). These trains reach speeds of 90 km/h (56 mph); including wait times at stops, the end-to-end average speed is 45 km/h (28 mph), three times faster than a bus and almost twice as fast as a B-Line express bus. During cold weather, TransLink crews use hockey sticks to clear snow and ice from train doors, which would otherwise prevent some doors from being able to open. The trains are also slowed and staffed by TransLink attendants, who can manually override the automatic controls in the event of an obstruction caused by snow or ice.

==== UTDC ICTS Mark I fleet ====
An original Mark I train (2013)

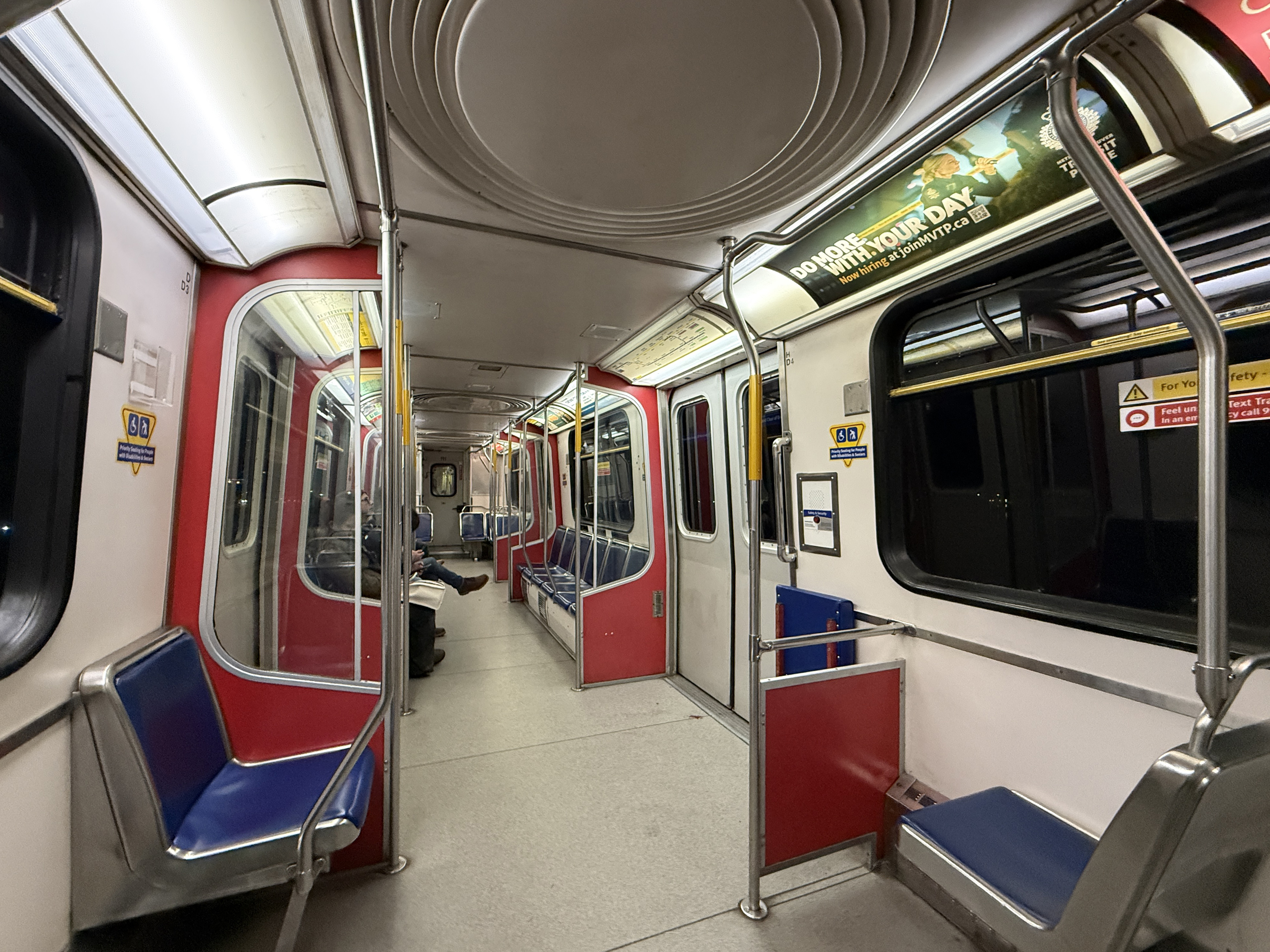
The interior of a Mark I train on the Expo line

The initial fleet consisted of 12.7 m (41 ft 8 in) lightweight Mark I ICTS cars from Urban Transportation Development Corporation, similar to those used by Toronto's Line 3 Scarborough and the Detroit People Mover. Mark I vehicles are composed of mated pairs and normally run as six-car trains and only on the Expo Line, but can be run in two-, four-, or six-car configurations. The maximum based on current station platform lengths is a six-car configuration, totalling 76.2 metres (250 ft). The SkyTrain fleet includes 150 Mark I cars. These trains have a mix of forward-, reverse- and side-facing seats; red, white, and blue interiors; and four doors per car, two per side.

==== Bombardier ART Mark II fleet ====
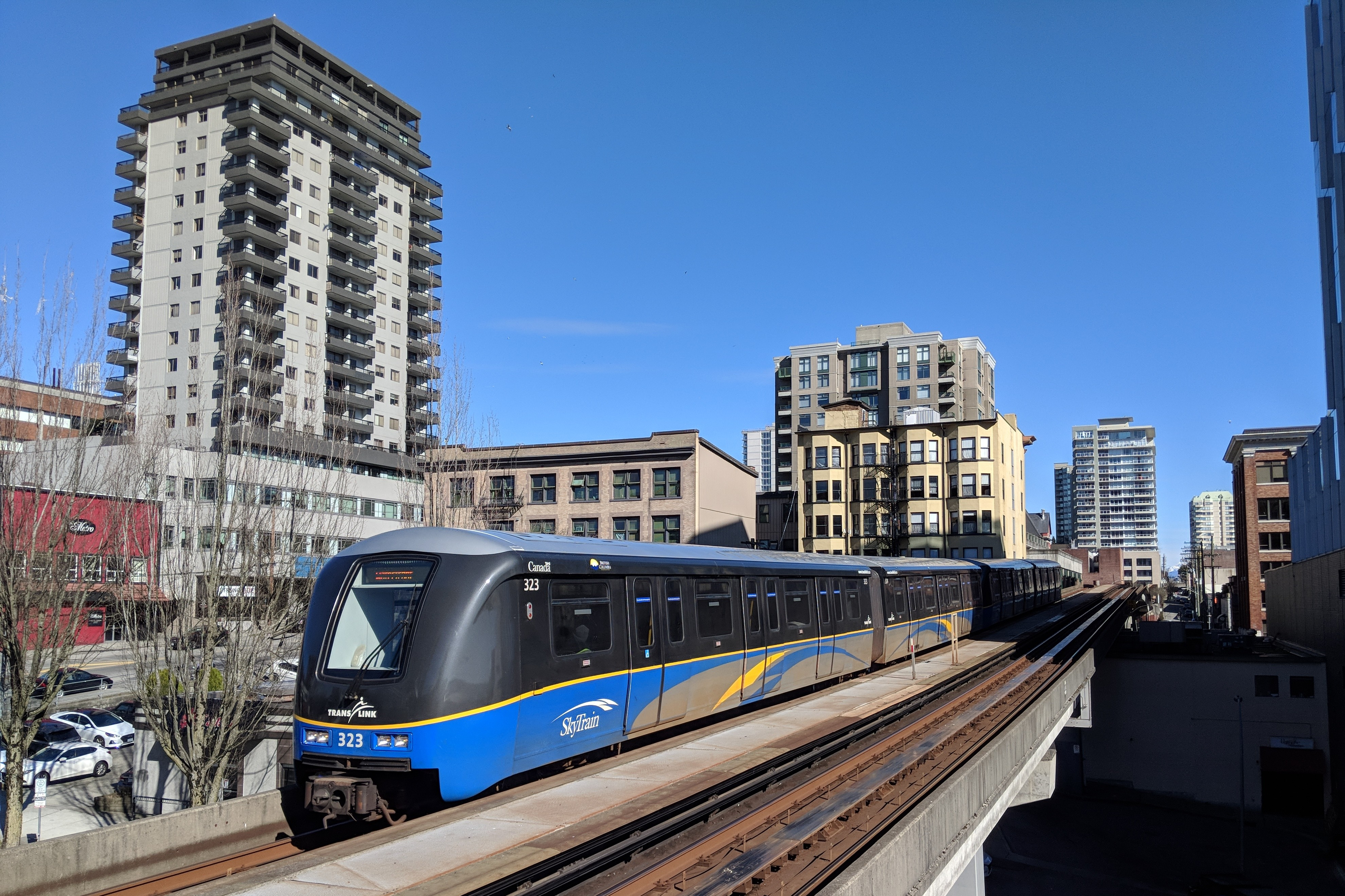
A second generation Mark II train in New Westminster (2019)

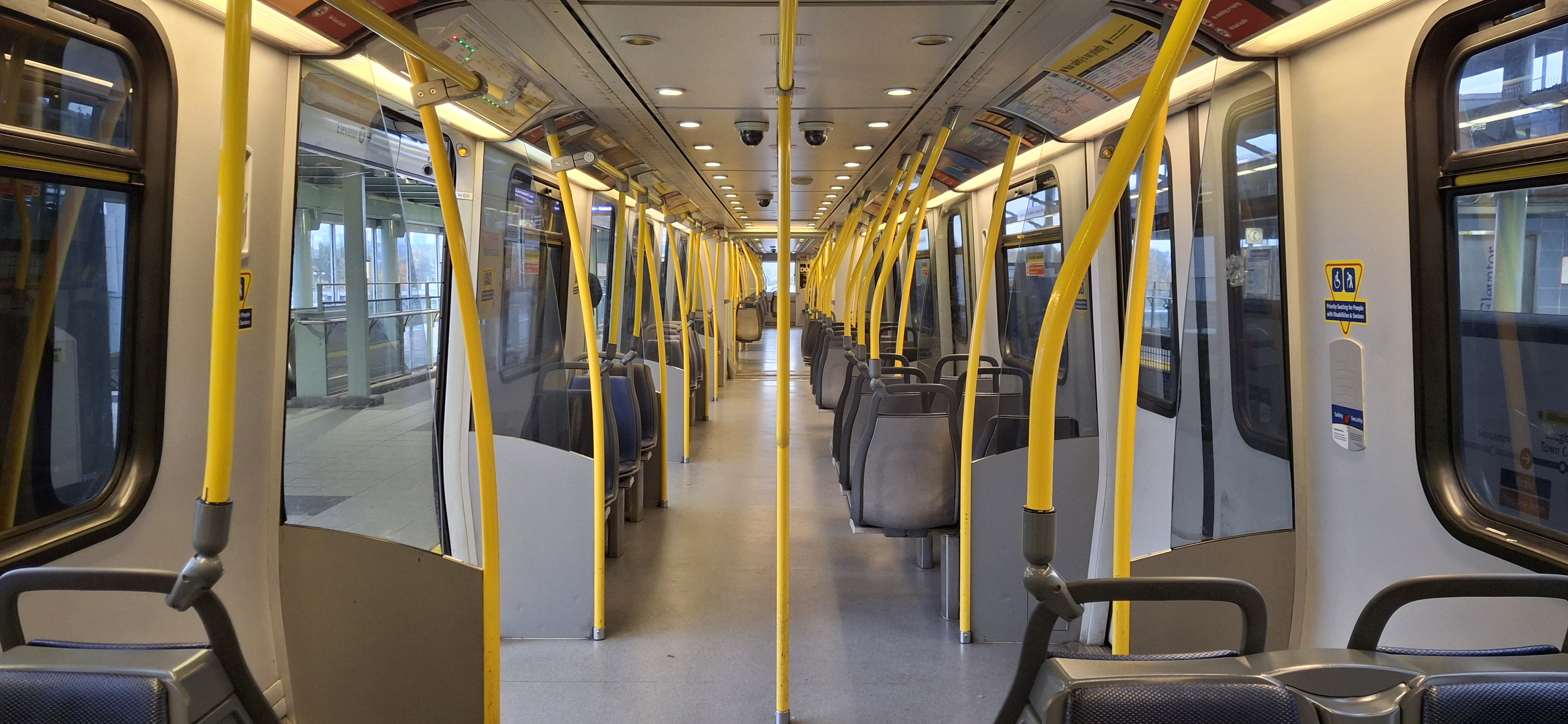
The interior of a Mark II train on the Expo Line

When the Millennium Line was built, TransLink ordered new-generation Mark II ART trains from Bombardier Transportation, some of which were assembled in a Burnaby factory. Similar trains are used in Kuala Lumpur's Kelana Jaya Line, New York's JFK AirTrain, and the Beijing Airport Express. These trains are run in four-car configurations on the Expo Line, and two-car configurations on the Millennium Line. Each pair of cars is semi-permanently joined together in a twin unit or "married pair", with a length of 33.4 metres (110 ft). Mark II trains have a streamlined front and rear, an articulated joint allowing passengers to walk the length of a married pair, white/grey/blue interior, and six doors per car, three per side. TransLink also ordered 48 Mark II ART cars (2009/2010 model) in 2009 to further supplement supply and integrate new features such as CCTV, new seats and stanchions in a different layout, destination signs at the ends, lower floor entrances, LED door indicators, and visual maps with LED lights.

==== Bombardier Innovia Metro 300 (ART Mark III) fleet ====
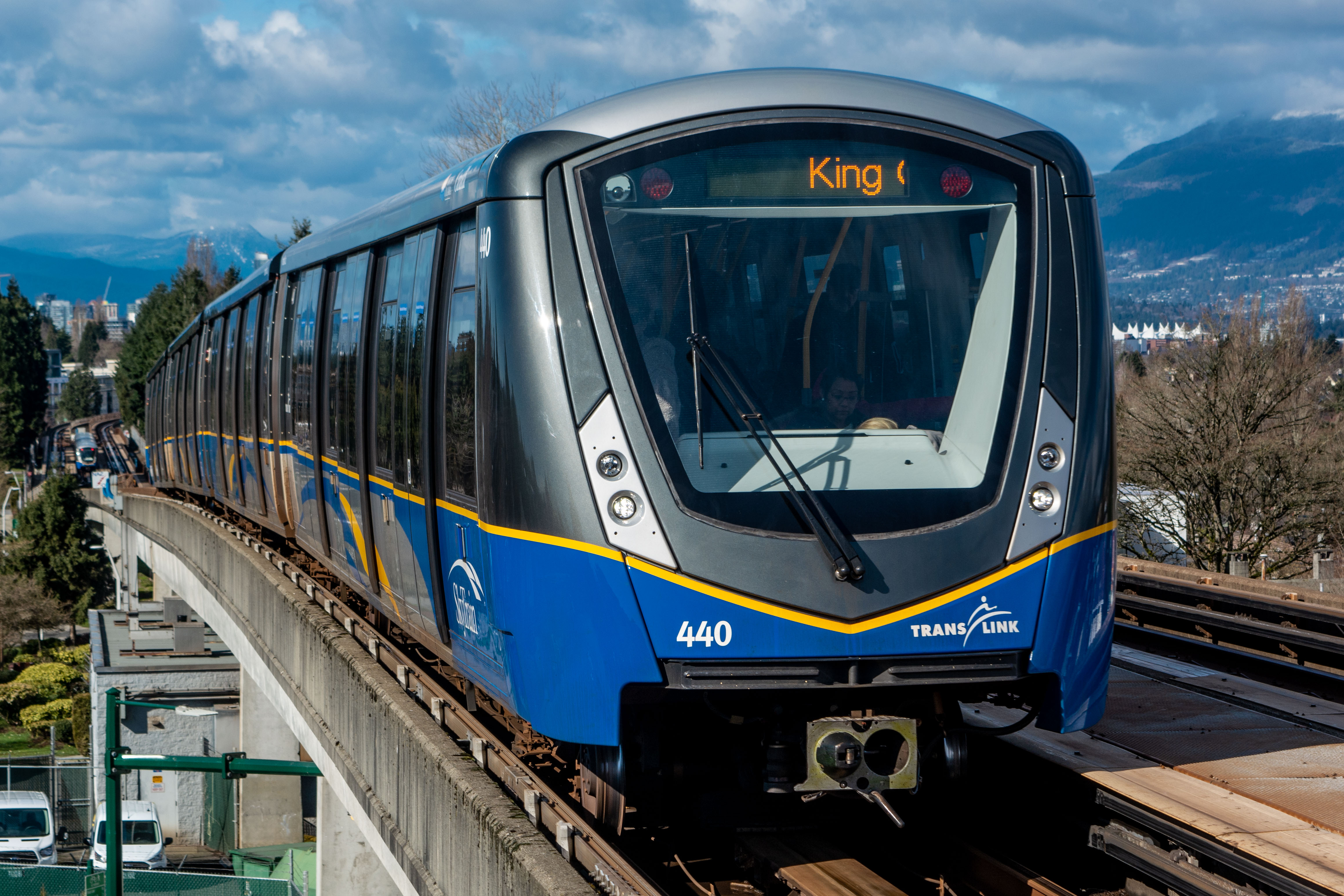
A Mark III train in Vancouver (2020)

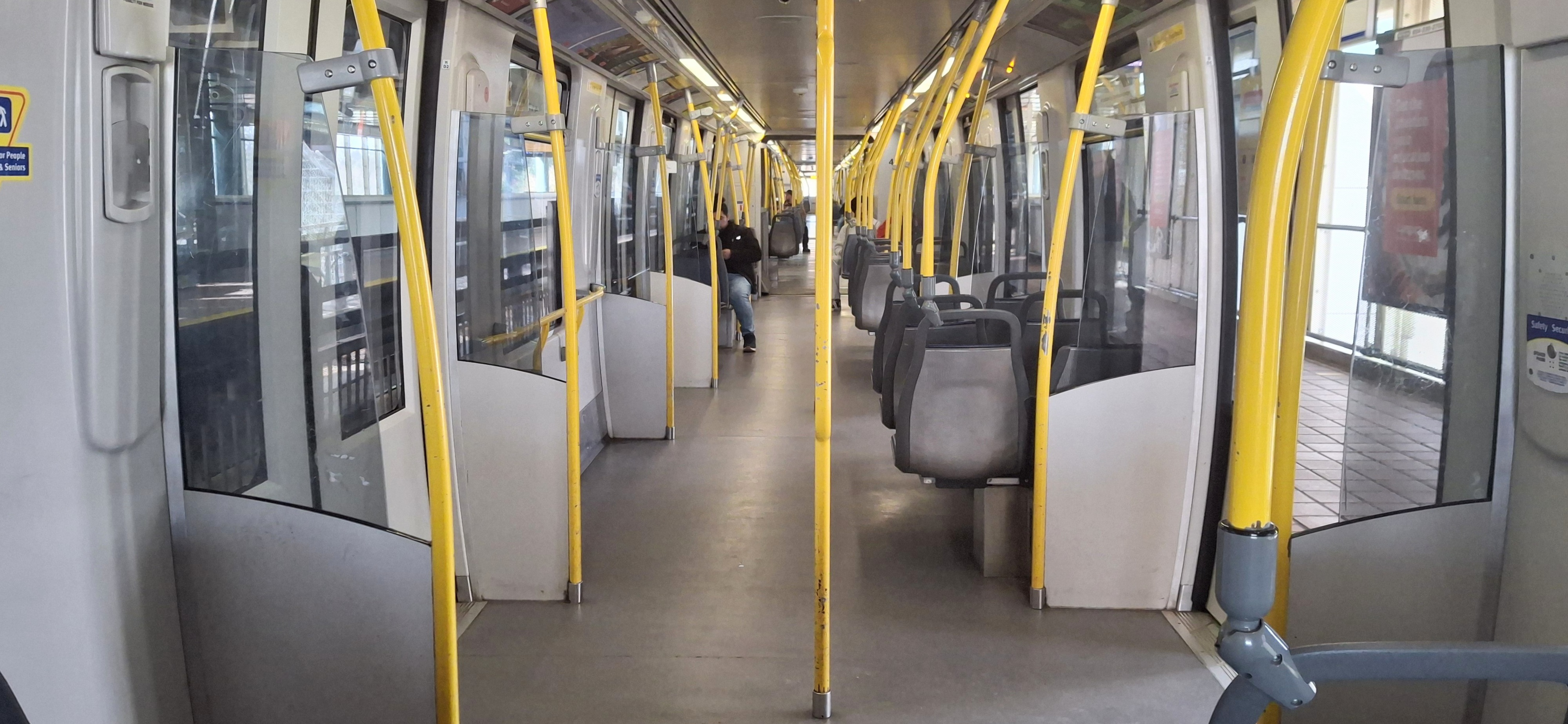
The interior of a Mark III train on the Expo Line

The Bombardier ART model has undergone several redesigns from the original UTDC ICTS model, and the Mark II design has been updated by Bombardier, with this newest offering being the Innovia Metro 300. Dimensions are similar to the Mark II, with capacity improvements offered over the outgoing model through redesigned car layout. TransLink ordered 28 Mark III cars, which began delivery in 2015, and went into service beginning in August 2016. The vehicles appear sleeker, with larger windows on the sides of the train, and redesigned windows and headlights on the ends of the cars. The interior is largely similar to the second generation of Mark II cars, with the some seats removed to better accommodate bicycles and strollers. TransLink has claimed that the interior of the Mark III offers better sound and heat insulation. TransLink ordered the cars for the Evergreen Extension in a 4-car articulated configuration, with two centre cars, to allow full-length train movements by passengers. However, due to a shortage of trains, the Mark IIIs are being used on the Expo Line, while 2-car Innovia 200 (Mk2) serve the Millennium Line. On December 16, 2016, TransLink ordered 28 more Mark III cars, bringing the total of Mark III cars to 56 by the end of 2019. On February 22, 2018, TransLink announced a further order of 28 Mark III cars, which will bring the total number of Mark III cars to 84 once all trains are in service by the end of 2020.

==== Alstom Mark V fleet ====
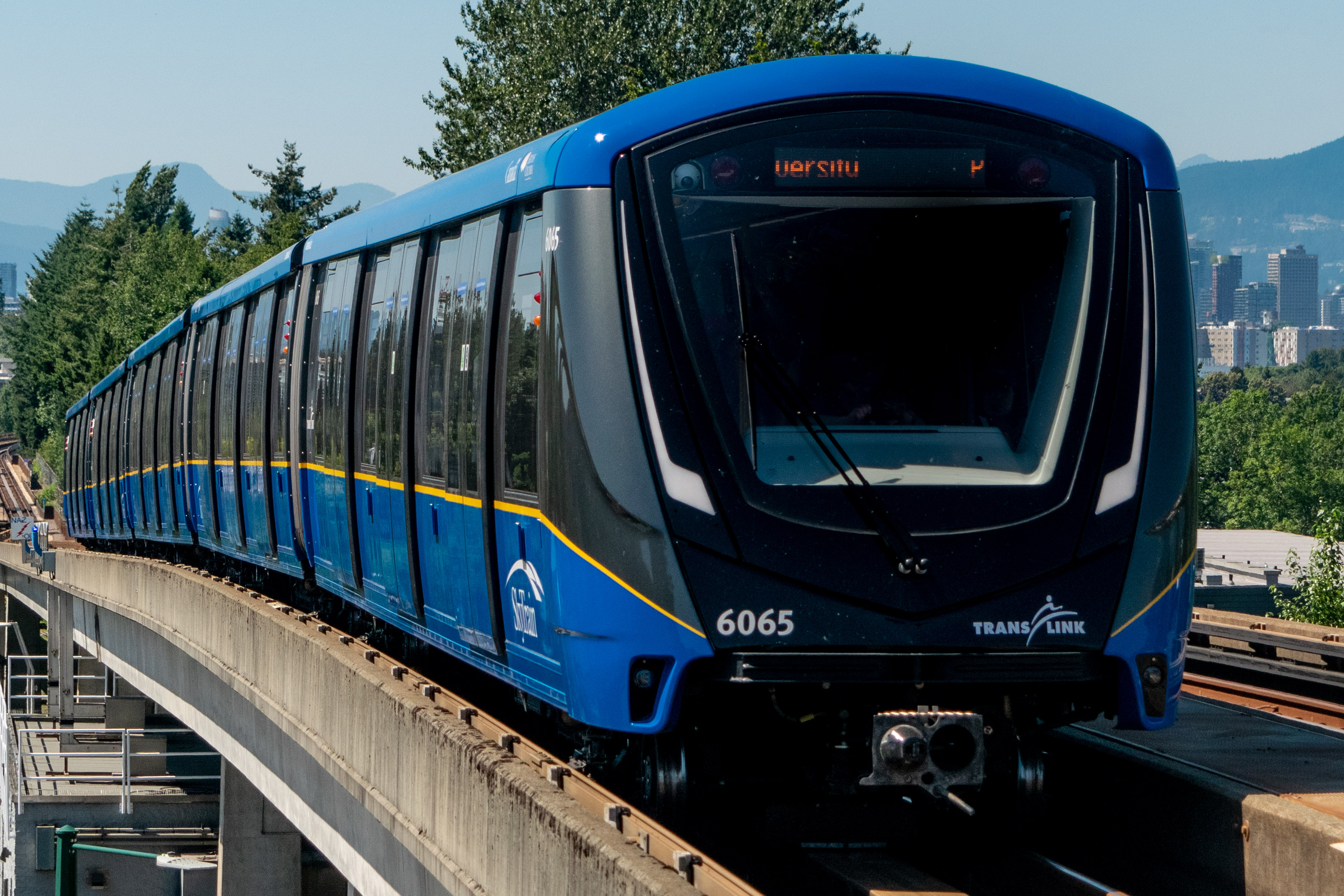
The Mark V trains are the longest trains on the network at 85 m (279 ft) long.

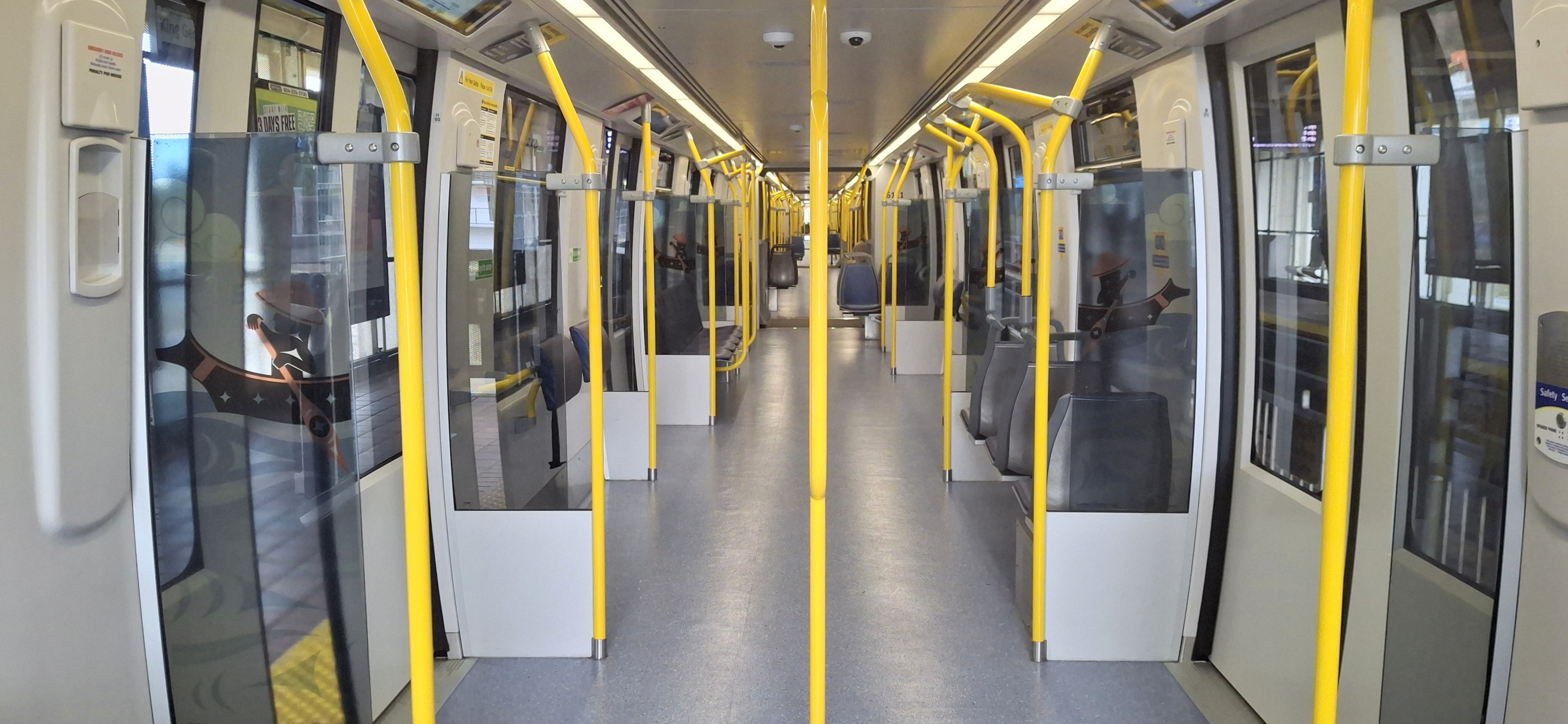
The interior of a Mark V train on the Expo Line

In 2020, TransLink ordered 205 new trains for $723 million. This was done in anticipation of the opening of the Millennium Line's Broadway extension and to replace the aging Mark I trains. Alstom, which bought Bombardier Transportation in January 2021, was contracted to build the Mark V trainsets. These trains come in sets of five cars, and they share a similar design to the Mark III trains. They are the longest trains in the system at 85 m (279 ft) long. Some new features include a new seating layout, replacing the LED signs used in second-generation Mark II and Mark III trains, LCD screens above the doorways, new door indicator lights, wider aisles for more standing space, more flex areas for wheelchairs, bikes, strollers, leaning pads, and improved HVAC. Some other notable features include the addition of Indigenous artwork decorating the interiors, side-facing seats, last seen in the Mark I models, and the return of the "driver's seat" at each train end, last seen in the Mark II models. Initial testing for Mark V trains on the SkyTrain network began in March 2025 during non-peak hours to assess safety and reliability and revenue service for the trains began that July.

=== Canada Line stock ===
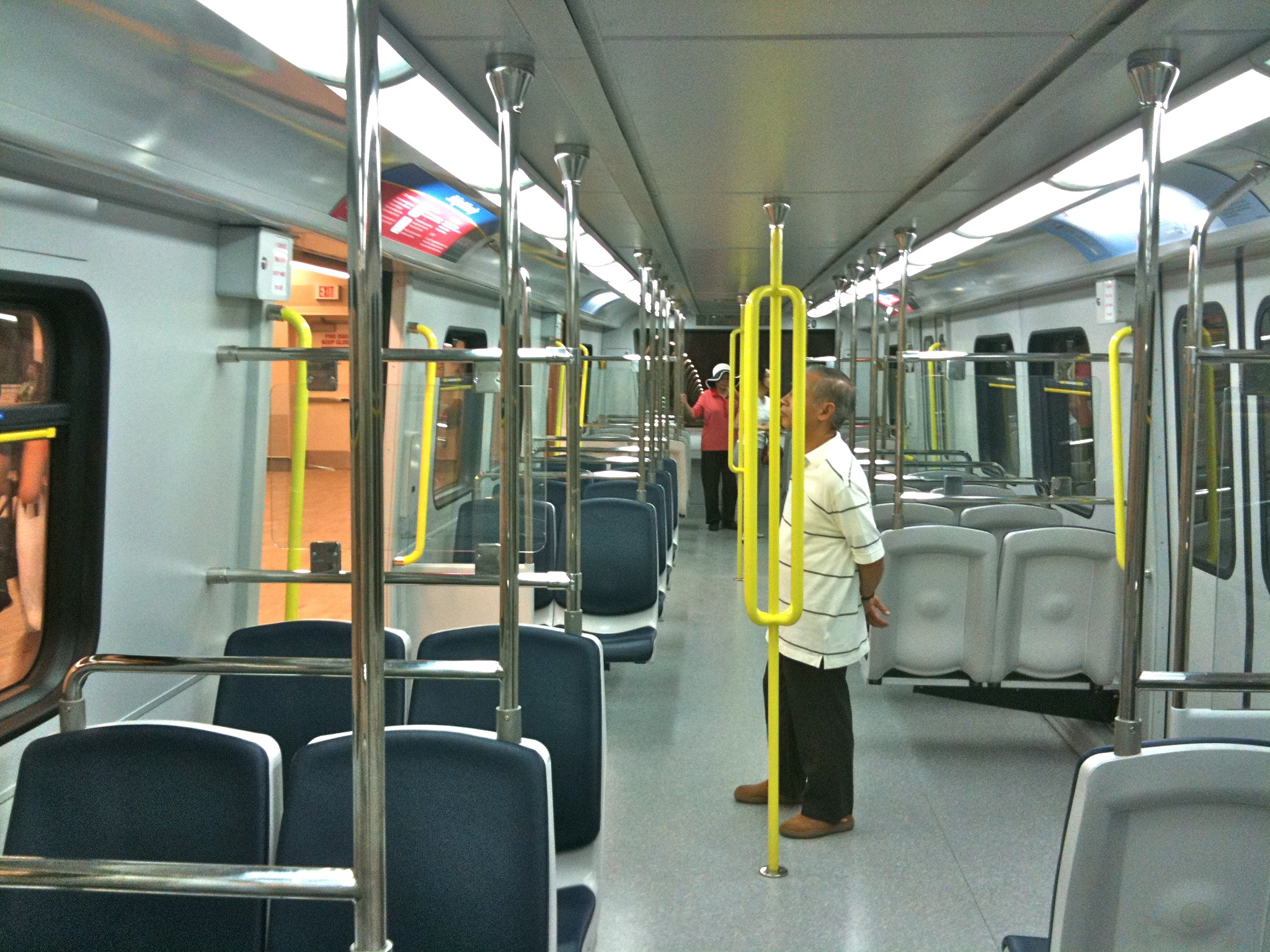
Canada Line's Hyundai Rotem trains are wider than Bombardier Mark II trains, with spaces assigned for wheelchairs, bicycles and luggage (2009).

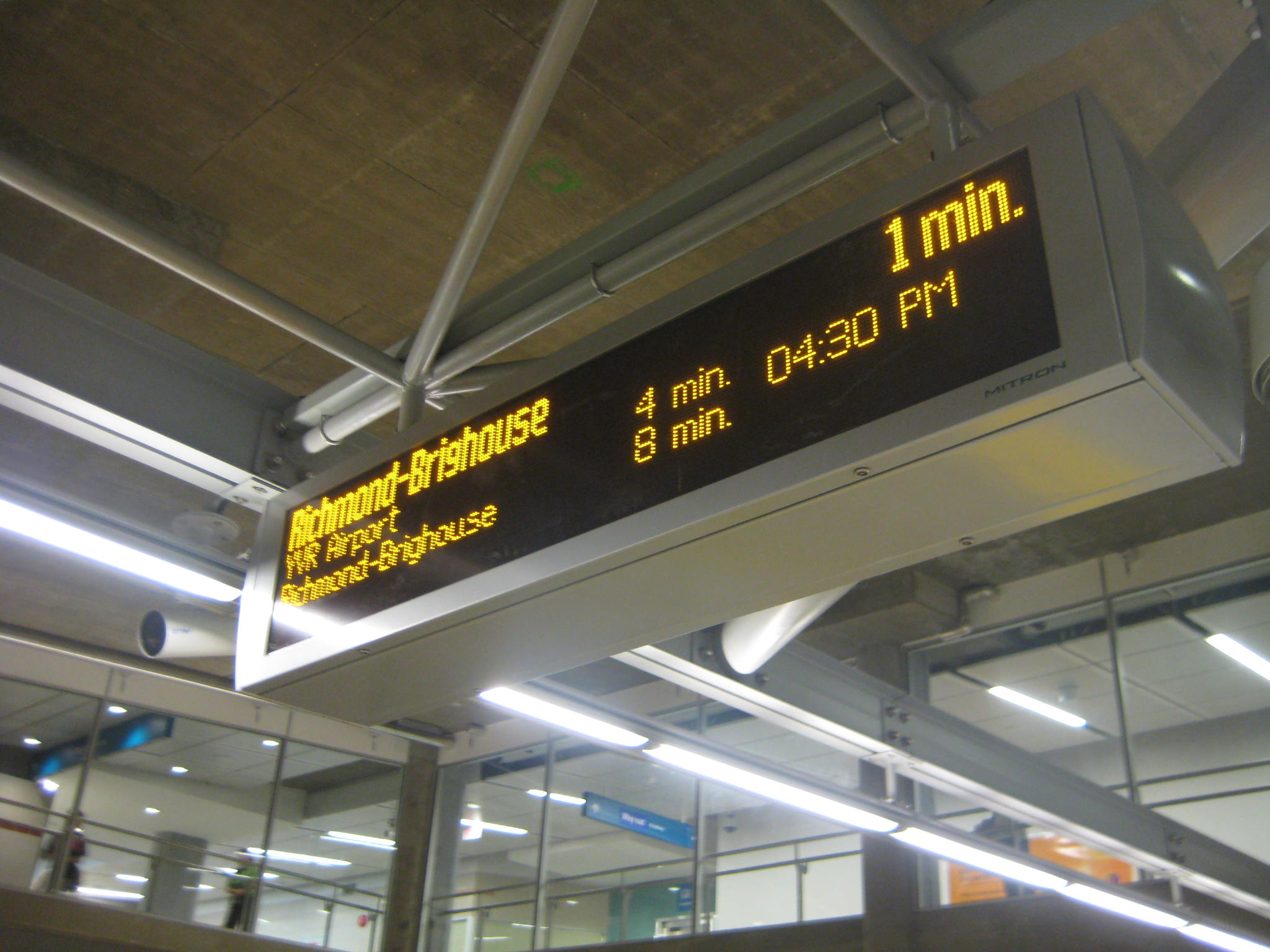
Real-time information is provided on every station platform on the Canada Line (2009).

The Canada Line uses Hyundai Rotem EMU vehicles, with cars powered by conventional electric motors instead of the linear induction motor (LIM) technology used by the Expo and Millennium Line vehicles; as a result, the Canada Line vehicles cannot be used on the Expo and Millennium Lines. There are 20 trains, which operate as two-carriage articulated units and can reach a speed of 80 km/h (50 mph). They are maintained at a yard next to Bridgeport station in Richmond.

On February 22, 2018, TransLink announced an additional order of 24 Canada Line cars to be brought into service by 2020, bringing the total to 32 trains operating as two-car units.

== Future expansion ==
Several possible expansions to the SkyTrain network have been announced. In 2005, TransLink released a ten-year outlook outlining a potential line to the University of British Columbia (UBC) and further expansion of the Expo Line into Surrey. In 2011, two separate rapid transit studies have given further examination and consultation into rapid transit options for expansion for the UBC–Broadway corridor, and Surrey and the South of Fraser region. Expo Line capacity upgrades are also being planned to meet future demand.

A pair of expansions—the Broadway corridor extension and the Expo Line to Langley—began construction in the early 2020s alongside the addition of 235 new cars and upgrades to SkyTrain facilities.

=== Broadway corridor extension ===
Early proposals planned to extend SkyTrain west along the Broadway corridor, but stopped well short of UBC because of the cost, estimated at $700 million in 1999. However, the Provincial Transit Plan, released in February 2008, included funding for the entire Broadway corridor to UBC. The line would replace the region's busiest bus routes, where over 100,000 trips are made daily. The line would also include an interchange with the Canada Line at Cambie Street. In 2008, the new line was estimated to cost $2.8 billion, with an expected completion date of 2020.

Government statements suggested that the UBC line would be an extension of the SkyTrain network from VCC–Clark station via elevated platforms or a tunnel along Broadway ending at University of British Columbia Vancouver. This would mean that riders travelling from Coquitlam to UBC would not need to change trains, as Millennium Line trains would continue to UBC from Lafarge Lake–Douglas station. Riders from the Evergreen Extension east of Commercial–Broadway station would also have a secondary route to downtown with the option of transferring to the Canada Line instead of the Expo Line. However, light rail and higher-capacity bus rapid transit were also proposed.

In 2011, with the UBC Line Rapid Transit Study, SkyTrain was evaluated as a possible technology for rapid transit expansion along the Broadway corridor to UBC, along with light rail transit and bus rapid Transit. The June 2014 plan proposes a first phase that would extend the Millennium Line from VCC–Clark station to Arbutus Street using SkyTrain technology, with an interchange with the Canada Line at Broadway–City Hall station; a second phase would see the line extended from Arbutus to UBC. A plebiscite to raise 25 percent of the funds required for the Broadway extension to Arbutus, among other transit expansion plans, was defeated in 2015.

On March 16, 2018, the provincial government approved the construction of an extension of the Millennium Line underneath Broadway, which will extend the line underground west to Arbutus Street, while adding six new stations. Early work was slated to begin in 2019 with a completion date set for 2025. On April 19, 2018, the UBC Board of Governors indicated it would consider contributing funds towards accelerating the extension of the Millennium Line from its new planned terminus at Arbutus to the university.

On January 30, 2019, Vancouver City Council endorsed building the line underground all the way to UBC.

On July 17, 2020, the British Columbia government announced that the Acciona–Ghella Joint Venture Company had been selected to receive the design–build contract for the Broadway extension. Premier John Horgan confirmed on September 4, 2020, that construction would proceed in the fourth quarter of 2020 despite the ongoing COVID-19 pandemic in British Columbia. Horgan also confirmed that the extension is expected to be in service by 2025. Transportation Minister Claire Trevena also stated that there were no immediate plans to extend the line towards the UBC campus.

The provincial government announced on November 24, 2022, that the opening of the extension would be pushed back to early 2026 owing to a labour dispute affecting concrete workers which took place that June. On May 24, 2024, the provincial government announced that the extension opening would be further delayed to late 2027, due to various delays which occurred during the tunnel-boring process.

=== Expo Line extension ===
The 2008 Provincial Transit Plan included a 6-kilometre (3.7 mi) extension of the Expo Line from King George station in Surrey east to Guildford, then along 152 Street to Fraser Highway and southeast to 168 Street; a further extension to Willowbrook Shopping Centre in Langley City was also included in the plan. After a period of time where SkyTrain, light rail transit, and bus rapid transit were considered for service expansion, federal funding was secured in 2021 to build a 16-kilometre (9.9 mi) SkyTrain extension to Langley City at a total cost (shared between the federal government, provincial government, and TransLink) between $3.8 and $3.95 billion. In July 2022, the extension received approval from the provincial government to be built in one single phase, opening in 2028 with eight stations. Procurement for private contractors began in October 2022 and was scheduled to end with the selection of winning bids by December 2023. The project was divided into three general contracts—the guideway, stations, and electrical systems. Construction began in November 2024 and is, as of 2025, expected to be completed in 2029.

=== Expo Line capacity expansion ===
Several options have been considered, planned, or implemented to improve capacity on the Expo Line, including operating longer trains, reducing operating headways, and extending station platforms beyond 80 metres (260 ft). In late 2020, TransLink ordered 41 Alstom Mark V trainsets in five-car configurations that will eventually replace older, lower-capacity trains. Six more Alstom Mark V trainsets were ordered in May 2024, bringing the total to 47 Mark V trainsets.

=== Coquitlam maintenance facility ===
In March 2021, it was announced that a new yard would be constructed to provide storage space and maintenance needed for the upcoming extensions of the Expo and Millennium lines. This new facility is to be located near the New Westminster–Coquitlam border along North Road. The land was purchased for $82.5 million, while the cost for the structure and additional tracks was estimated at an additional $300 million. The new yard was expected to provide additional maintenance and space in time for the opening of the Millennium Line's Broadway extension in early 2026. As of February 2024, the opening of the Coquitlam maintenance facility, which is expected to have a storage capacity of 145 cars, is scheduled to take place in 2027.

=== University of British Columbia extension ===
On January 14, 2008, the British Columbia provincial government announced a commitment to the expansion of the Millennium Line to the University of British Columbia (UBC) by 2020 as part of a $14-billion transit spending package to address climate change. It was not clear what route the new line would take, but it was hinted that there would be less use of cut-and-cover tunnelling to minimize disruption to businesses along Broadway and avoid the same problems seen during the Canada Line construction along Cambie Street. This expansion failed to materialize. On February 15, 2019, the TransLink Mayors' Council again approved an extension of the line to the UBC campus, although funding for this continuation past Arbutus Street had not yet been secured. In April 2022, TransLink assessed possible route options in the UBC area, including the provision of additional pocket storage tracks near the UBC terminus owing to the distance between the university and the nearest storage yard. As a result, the terminus at UBC would hypothetically be larger in size in order to accommodate the additional storage space and operational flexibility. In March 2023, it was announced that a contractor would be hired to put together a business case for the extension, which was to be presented in December 2024.

=== Port Coquitlam extension ===
When the Evergreen Extension was built, the first few metres of track and a track switch for an eventual eastward extension to Port Coquitlam were built at Coquitlam Central station. Such an extension would create two branches where trains would alternate between going east to Lafarge Lake–Douglas station or Port Coquitlam. A feasibility study was conducted, started during early 2020 and running for about six months. Both Port Coquitlam mayor Brad West, Port Coquitlam's city council, and Coquitlam's city council have stated support for the extension. However, as of 2022, no funding had been secured nor a formal plan created. Studying this extension was stated as a long-term goal by TransLink in the Access for Everyone Plan and Transport 2050 released in 2022.

=== North Shore connection ===
In 2019, the BC Ministry of Transportation and Infrastructure announced its intention to study a rapid transit link from Vancouver's city centre to the North Shore, possibly in the form of SkyTrain. By March 2020, the provincial government confirmed it had selected six possible routes for a "high-capacity, fixed-link, rapid transit crossing across Burrard Inlet between Vancouver and the North Shore". In 2022, TransLink suggested that a North Shore link would likely be created using bus rapid transit first while a concurrent feasibility study of a longer-term light rail transit or SkyTrain connection is conducted.

== See also ==
- List of metro systems
