= Surjeet Kalsey =

Canadian poet, writer, and translator

Surjeet Kalsey (born in Amritsar, Punjab, India) is a Canadian poet, dramatist, short story writer and translator who lives in British Columbia and writes in both Punjabi and English. She has published a dozen books.

== Life ==
After receiving a Master's Degree in English and Punjabi Literature from Punjab University, Chandigarh, she worked as the Punjabi Regional News Anchor for All India Radio. Kalsey earned a Master's in Creative Writing from the University of British Columbia and worked as a freelance writer, interpreter, and translator for several years. She earned a fourth master's degree in Counseling Psychology from the University of British Columbia, after which she has worked as a family therapist and bi-lingual instructor at the Vancouver Community College teaches Court & Health Interpreting Certification Program.

In 2014, Kalsey was awarded the University of British Columbia's Asian Studies Department lifetime achievement award for her literature.

== Works ==
- Paunan Nal Guftagoo - Punjabi Poetry - 1979
- Speaking to the Winds - Poetry English - 1982
- Foot Prints of Silence - Poetry English - 1988
- Saffron Leaves: an anthology of Canadian Punjabi Literature - 1992
- Glimpses of Twentieth Century Punjabi Poetry in English Translation - 1992
- Distant Women - Short Fiction - 1994
- Sat Parayian - Collection of Short Stories - 1994
- Behind the Palace Doors - Drama 1999
- Woman Words and Strength - Punjabi Poetry - 2000
- Aurat Shabad Te Shakti - Punjabi Poetry - 2000
- Daughters Behind the Palace Doors - Drama - 2000
- Mahlin Wasdiyan Dhian - Collection of One-Act Plays - 2000
- Prof. Mohan Singh (Punjabi poet) & Faiz Ahmed Faiz (Urdu Poet)- Identical and comparative Study - 2003
- Faiz Ahmed Faiz - Kav Sagar -Ed. Urdu Poetry in Gurmukhi Script, Tarlochan Publications - 2003
- Rom Rom Vich Jagdey Deevay - Punjabi Poetry, Lokgeet Publications - 2005
- Akas Barmala, Urdu poetry of Zahid Laeeq in Gurmukhi script by Ed. Surjeet Kalsey, 2006.
- Naam Tiharey - Punjabi Poetry, Akhar Publications - 2006
- Aurat Ton Aurat Tak - Surjeet Kalsey's Literary Journey - Ed. by Dr.Sharnajit Kaur, Tarlochan Publications - 2007
- Katha Teri Meri, Short Stories, Tarlochan Publications, 2008
- "Colours of My Heart" English poems, Tarlochan Publications,2011
- "Rung Mandal" poems in Punjabi, Tarlochan Publishers, Chandigarh 2013

== Sources ==
- Ryerson University - Asian Heritage in Canada: Authors - Kalsey, Surjeet - Accessed 07/07/08
- BC BookWorld Author Bank: KALSEY, Surjeet - Accessed 07/07/08
