= Quester Tangent Corporation =

North American supplier of train electronics and software

- Type: Private
- Industry: Manufacturing
- Founded: 1983
- Headquarters: 48°33′37″N 123°25′27.08″W, Saanichton, British Columbia, Canada
- Area served: Worldwide
- Products: Rail transit electronics
- Revenue: $10 million (2011)
- Number of employees: 75 (2015)
- Website: http://www.questertangent.com/

Quester Tangent Corporation (QTC) is an independent North American supplier of train electronics and software for the rail transit industry. Quester Tangent designs, develops and manufactures vehicle monitoring hardware and software for the global rail transit industry, including monitoring and control products, on-train displays, communication and data networks, and passenger information systems.

Quester Tangent facilities include 20,000 sq ft (1,900 m^{2}) of working space. The company has over 6,000 sq ft (560 m^{2}) of environmentally controlled manufacturing floor including 1,000 sq ft (93 m^{2}) for engineering prototyping, 2,500 sq ft (230 m^{2}) of inventory space and 3,000 sq ft (280 m^{2}) of testing space including a full electromagnetic compatibility/electromagnetic interference (EMI/EMC) lab.

== History ==
Founded in 1983, Quester Tangent Corporation initially served the marine sciences markets, providing equipment and systems for non-destructive, acoustic remote sensing of the seabed to assist with seabed classification and environmental monitoring. In 1994, Quester Tangent started producing monitoring and diagnostic systems for the rail transit industry.

In June 2013, Quester Tangent won the VIATeC Award for Technology Company of the Year.

Quester Tangent was a finalist in the Advancing Technology & Innovation category of the 2014 BC Export Awards.

On August 12, 2014 ownership of Quester Tangent's Marine Division - including all the assets, intellectual properties and patents of the QTC Seabed Classification Technologies - were transferred to Maritime Way Scientific Ltd.

== Overview ==
With over 7,000 products installed in revenue-service, Quester Tangent supplies train management, passenger information and fleet diagnostics systems for new builds, retrofits and overhauls.

Products include monitoring and control, on-train displays, event recorders, communication and data networks, passenger information systems, and wayside software. Quester has customers in many countries including Canada, France, China, and the USA; some notable clients using Quester products and services include the Massachusetts Bay Transportation Authority (MBTA), New York City Transit Authority, and the SkyTrain in Vancouver, BC.
