= Vancouver Community College =

Vocational training institute in Vancouver, British Columbia, Canada

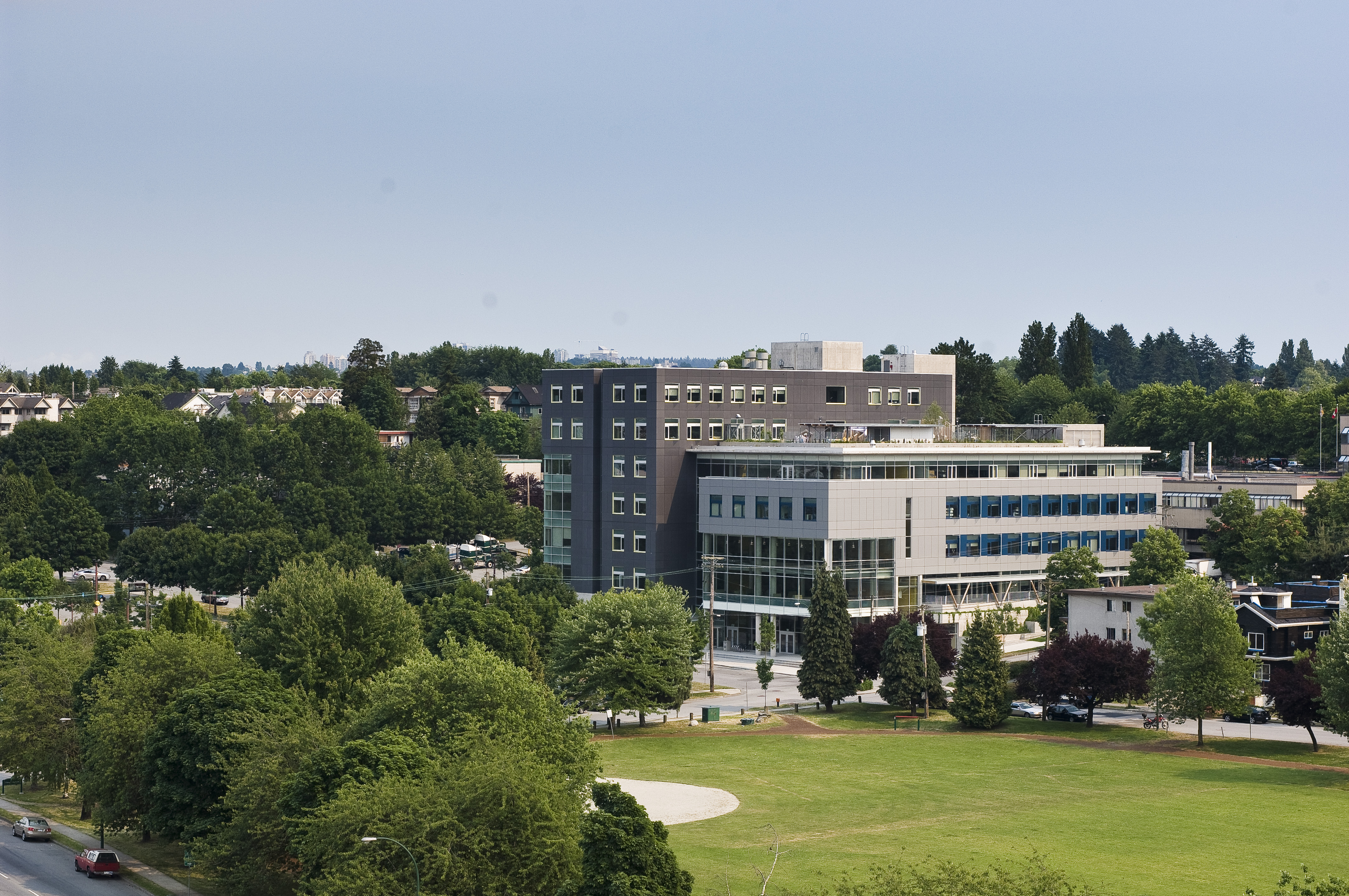
- Street entrance to VCC Broadway campus
- Motto: Latin: Carpe Diem
- Type: Public
- Established: 1965; 61 years ago
- Affiliations: CICan
- Endowment: $55,928,520
- Chair: Mahin Rashid
- President: Ajay Patel
- Provost: David Wells
- Administrative staff: 1,100
- Students: 3,994 FTE (2024-25 FTE)
- Location: Vancouver (2 campuses) in British Columbia
- Campus: Urban
- Colours: Dark green and light green
- Nickname: VCC
- Website: www.vcc.ca

Vancouver Community College (VCC) is a public community college in Vancouver, British Columbia, Canada. Founded in 1965, it is the oldest community college in British Columbia. VCC offers 79 certificate programs, 24 diploma programs, 9 award of achievement programs, 8 apprenticeship programs, 4 statement of completion programs, 3 bachelor's degree programs and 2 associate degree programs. VCC has two campuses: Broadway and Downtown.

The college accommodated 3,620 full-time equivalent students in 2022–2023, down from 6,122 in 2012–2013. International students comprise a growing percentage of VCC's enrolment, from 13.9% in 2019–2020 to 26.4% in 2022–2023, despite there being no on-campus student housing. In 2025 a reduction in international student revenued has led VCC to three rounds of staff layoffs.

== History ==
Vancouver Community College was established as Vancouver City College in 1965 through a merger of four local educational institutions: the Vancouver Vocational Institute, the Vancouver School of Art, the Vancouver School Board's Night School Program and the King Edward Senior Matriculation and Continuing Education Centre. Classes were initially held in the facilities of the King Edward Centre. In 1970, the college opened a campus in the Langara neighbourhood, which became an independent college in 1994.

Vancouver City College was renamed as Vancouver Community College in 1974, when it separated from the Vancouver School Board. In 1983, the main campus was moved from the King Edward Centre location at 12th Avenue and Oak Street to its current location at 1155 Broadway, now known as the Broadway campus. The present Downtown campus comprises the former facilities of the Vancouver Vocational Institute.

== Campus ==
Vancouver Community College has two campuses, which are accessible by Vancouver's SkyTrain. The Downtown campus is located at 200-block Dunsmuir at Hamilton (two blocks west of Stadium–Chinatown station) in Downtown Vancouver. VCC's second campus, known as the Broadway campus, is at 1155 East Broadway, by the VCC–Clark station. VCC also has nearly three dozen community outreach and learning centres.

January 2009 marked the opening of VCC's $55 million Broadway campus expansion project. $44 million was funded by the Government of British Columbia and the balance by VCC and community donors. The new building is 133,000 square feet (12,400 m^{2}) and seven storeys tall, home to VCC's health sciences training programs.

From 2014 to 2022, VCC shared facility space with BCIT on Annacis Island, where both institutions offered programming in heavy mechanical trades. In 2022, VCC closed programming at its Annacis Island campus, transitioning the majority of its heavy duty programs to BCIT and moving the remaining programs to its Broadway campus.

== Governance ==
Vancouver Community College is a public institution of post-secondary education administered by a Board of Governors, on behalf of the Government of British Columbia and the Ministry of Advanced Education and Labour Market Development. The board determines policy and reviews the college's performance as detailed in the College and Institutes Act. It also has primary responsibility for fostering the college's short- and long-term success.

The VCC Board of Directors consists of eight members appointed by government along with the VCC president, the Chair of Education Council and four elected Board members, including one faculty representative, one support staff representative and two student representatives. VCC was the only institution to hold the distinction of having the support staff representative act as board chair.

== Staff and faculty ==
CUPE Local 4627 Vancouver Community College Employees' Union (VCCEU), a trade union, not an association, represents approximately 600 support staff at Vancouver Community College and is covered by the CUPE Support Staff Collective Agreement (CUPE Local 4627). CUPE local 4627 workers provide services in: instruction, program assistance, finance, Aboriginal, administrative, bookstore, library, communication, food services, laboratory demonstration, research, IT, print and media technology. VCCEU was formed in 2003 and represents the technical employees, warehousemen, program assistants and cafeteria workers in the Food Trades division of the VCC. CUPE 4627 held their first strike in November 2012 with 96% support for a strike and successfully ratified a new agreement in March 2013 with no concessions and did not agree to the formulary.

On February 27, 1951, the Labour Board certified a bargaining unit of instructors, counselors and librarians in programs conducted by and at Vancouver Vocational Institute. That bargaining unit was called the Vocational Instructors' Association. This unit continues at VCC. The Vancouver Community College Faculty Association (VCCFA) represents approximately 750 instructors, counselors, librarians and health nurses working in Metro Vancouver. VCCFA is a member of the Federation of Post Secondary Educators of B.C. (FPSE Local 15). Employment for instructors, librarians, counselors and department heads is covered by the Faculty Association Collective Agreement.

== Academics ==
VCC offers career programs leading to one-year certificates, two-year diplomas and four-year bachelor's degrees in fields such as the arts, business, trades and health sciences. The college offers both full-time and part-time programs in spring, summer and fall terms. Individual courses are also available to supplement high school education or offer continuing education.

== Student life ==
Many of Vancouver Community College's programs require students to train in local businesses and facilities to gain practical skills. A number of these are located on campus, open to students and the general public. JJ's Dining Room at the downtown campus, is run by culinary arts students. The Four Corners restaurant and the Seiffert Market are run by VCC hospitality management students. The Broadway and Downtown campuses have several coffee and snack kiosks as well as full-service cafeterias. The VCC salon at the Downtown campus offers hairstyling and esthetics services from students learning in the Hair Design and esthetics programs.

=== Student government ===
The Students' Union of Vancouver Community College (SUVCC) was formed in 1974. Based at the Downtown campus, its goal is to provide and encourage access to recreation, events and opportunities for VCC students. SUVCC also offers students a health and dental plan and low cost access to student services. It is a member of the British Columbia Federation of Students and participates in the British Columbia U-Pass programme.

=== Student services ===
VCC is accessible to students with disabilities who study in either specialized programs or in mainstream programs. Access to equipment and braille or taped class material is available. VCC also provides sign language interpreting or TypeWell services for Deaf, hard-of-hearing and DeafBlind students for all educational needs. Advisors can provide exam accommodation, job search assistance and community resource referrals. The college also offers on-site licensed, non-profit child care, professional counselling and on-site health services with a doctor at each campus. International students can access educational planning, study permit extensions and obtain medical insurance and applications for work permits.

=== Aboriginal services ===
VCC is a member of the Coastal Corridor Consortium, which works to improve levels of participation and success for Aboriginal students. The Consortium includes the Lil'wat Nation, Musqueam Nation, shíshálh Nation, Squamish Nation, Tsleil-Waututh Nation, United Native Nations, Métis Nation British Columbia, Capilano University, Native Education College.

VCC has a specialized Aboriginal Education and Services department to provide a range of services for Aboriginal students including academic and personal support and referrals, cultural workshops and Elder support. The Broadway and Downtown campuses both have unique areas classified Aboriginal Gathering Spaces. Aboriginal Elders are on site at each campus to help students with studies and counseling.

== Notable alumni ==
- Rudwan Khalil Abubaker — actor and model, killed in Chechnya by Russian special forces
- David T. Alexander — painter
- Mary Barry — singer and songwriter
- Michael Blake — musician
- Kevin Cherkas — chef and owner of Cuca Restaurant
- Elaine Dagg-Jackson — curler, coach, and Olympian
- Gwaai Edenshaw — Haida artist and filmmaker from Canada
- Veda Hille — singer-songwriter, keyboardist and tenor guitar player
- Kerry Jang — politician
- Iain Lawrence — writer
- Keith Maillard — writer
- Aiyyana Maracle — Indigenous performance artist
- Âhasiw Maskêgon-Iskwêw — Canadian artist of Haida heritage
- Karen McPherson — swimmer and Paralympian
- Haruko Okano — artist, poet, and activist
- Christina Maria Rieder (Rykka) — singer and songwriter
- Jennifer Scott — singer and pianist
- Anthony Sedlak — chef and Food Network host
- Jay Simeon — artist
- Camille Thomas — singer in Carmen and Camille
- Benny Yau — actor and singer

== Notable staff ==
- Ujjal Dosanjh – Language Instruction for Newcomers to Canada (LINC), 33rd premier of British Columbia, politician and lawyer
- Kim Campbell – Political science, 19th Prime Minister of Canada
- Robert Creech – Founder and first chairman of VCC music department, musician and arts administrator
- Jerry Granelli – Master class instructor on jazz, drummer
- Peter Hannan – Music, composer
- Kevin Hanson – Assistant basketball coach, basketball coach at University of British Columbia (UBC)
- Antony Holland – VCC theatre arts program founder, actor, playwright, and theatre director
- Surjeet Kalsey – English and Punjabi instructor, writer and translator
- Kathy Kinloch – VCC president 2010-2013, executive
- Crawford Kilian – Teacher, novelist and professor
- John Korsrud – Music, composer and trumpeter
- Evelyn Lau – Writer-in-residence, poet and novelist
- Fraser MacPherson – Jazz and Commercial Music, jazz musician
- Anthony S. Manera – VCC president and CEO 1978-1985, president of Canadian Broadcasting Corporation 1993-1995
- Mark Takeshi McGregor Music, flutist, artist and educator
- Rachel Notley – Board member, 17th premier of Alberta, politician
- Morgan Nyberg – English as a Second Language, writer and educator
- Gayla Reid – Women's studies, writer
- Dave Robbins – Jazz and Commercial Music, trombonist, composer, educator
- Jane Shin – Associate Vice-President, member of BC Legislative Assembly 2013-2017.
- Alice Wong – English as a Second Language and Entrepreneurship, member of Parliament (MP) for Richmond Centre 2015–2021

== See also ==
- List of institutes and colleges in British Columbia
- List of universities in British Columbia
- Higher education in British Columbia
- Education in Canada
