= Rudwan Khalil Abubaker =

Canadian actor

- Born: 1978
- Citizenship: Eritrea
- Occupation: Actor

Rudwan Khalil Abubaker (1978–2004) was a Canadian independent film actor and amateur model from Vancouver, British Columbia, who was killed by Russian security forces in Chechnya on October 7, 2004.

His family came to Canada from Eritrea as refugees with their four children. Abubaker was accepted into Vancouver Community College to study information technology. A member of the Dar al-Madinah Islamic Society Mosque in Vancouver, He was a "gentle" man who loved soccer and hip hop music. He had just finished the Hajj and visiting relatives in Dubai and was headed to a wedding in Azerbaijan with his friend Kamal Elbahja.

I would like to see the Imams who send young people over to die charged.

— Phil Rankin, lawyer for Abubaker's family

While in Dubai, Abubaker phoned his family to tell them that he was considering staying in the region to open a hip-hop storefront, and that Elbahja was going to head off to Russia.

Abubaker's body was identified by his driver's license and Canadian passport, which showed that he had been to London and Amsterdam. When his family asked for his body, Russia refused stating that it had been buried where he fell. Russia claims he was an explosives expert. His family was represented by lawyer Phil Rankin, who had earlier defended Essam Marzouk during his application for refugee status.
