= Kevin Hanson =

Canadian basketball coach (born 1964)

Kevin Lyle Hanson (born January 18, 1964) is a Canadian basketball coach, who served as head men's basketball coach at the University of British Columbia from 2000 to 2025.

== Career ==
=== Player ===
Hanson played at Seaquam Secondary School in North Delta, British Columbia before joining the Falcons of Langara College. He earned Langara outstanding male athlete and CCAA All-Canadian honours in 1984. After two years at Langara, he transferred to the University of British Columbia in 1984. He reached the CIAU Championship Game with UBC in 1987, falling short to Brandon, while Hanson earned Tournament All-Star Team that year.

=== Coach ===
Hanson began his coaching career with assistant coaching stints at Vancouver Community College (1987–88), Simon Fraser University (1988-89) and the University of British Columbia (1990–91). During his nine-year tenure as head coach of Langara College (1991-2000), Hanson steered the Falcons to two CCAA National Championships (1998, 1999), two CCAA silver medals (1992, 1995), Pacwest Provincial Championships in 1992, 1995, 1997, 1998 and 1999 as well as to a total of 261 wins.

He was appointed head coach of the University of British Columbia men's basketball team in 2000. He guided UBC to the CIS Championship Game in 2009 and 2010, where his Thunderbirds fell short to Carleton and Saskatchewan respectively. In 2003, 2007, 2008, 2011, 2013 and 2020, he coached UBC to Canada West Championships. Hanson was presented with the Stuart W. Aberdeen Memorial Trophy (CIS Coach of the Year) in 2006 and 2010 and earned Canada West Coach of the Year distinction in 2002, 2006, 2009, 2010, 2011 and 2017.

Hanson retired as University of British Columbia head coach in May 2025. In his 20-year stint, he led the team to 614 victories, including a record-breaking 378 in Canada West regular season play. In 2025, he was inducted into the Canadian Collegiate Athletic Association Hall of Fame. After stepping down as head coach, Hanson was named Senior Advisor, Basketball Operations at the University of British Columbia.

==== National team ====
Hanson was the head coach of Team Canada at the 2003, 2005, 2011 and 2017 University Games, guiding the squad to silver in 2011 and a bronze medal in 2003. In the summer of 2006, he served as guest coach at Canada's men's national team camp. In 1997, he coached the British Columbia under-19-boys team to gold at the Canada Summer Games. As an assistant coach of the Canadian team, he won a silver medal at the 2018 Commonwealth Games in Gold Coast, Australia.

== Personal life ==
His wife Theresa held senior leadership positions within the athletics department at the University of British Columbia, before being named senior director of athletics and recreation at Simon Fraser University in October 2015.
