= Metropolitan Vancouver Hotel =

Hotel in Vancouver, British Columbia, Canada

Metropolitan Hotel Vancouver
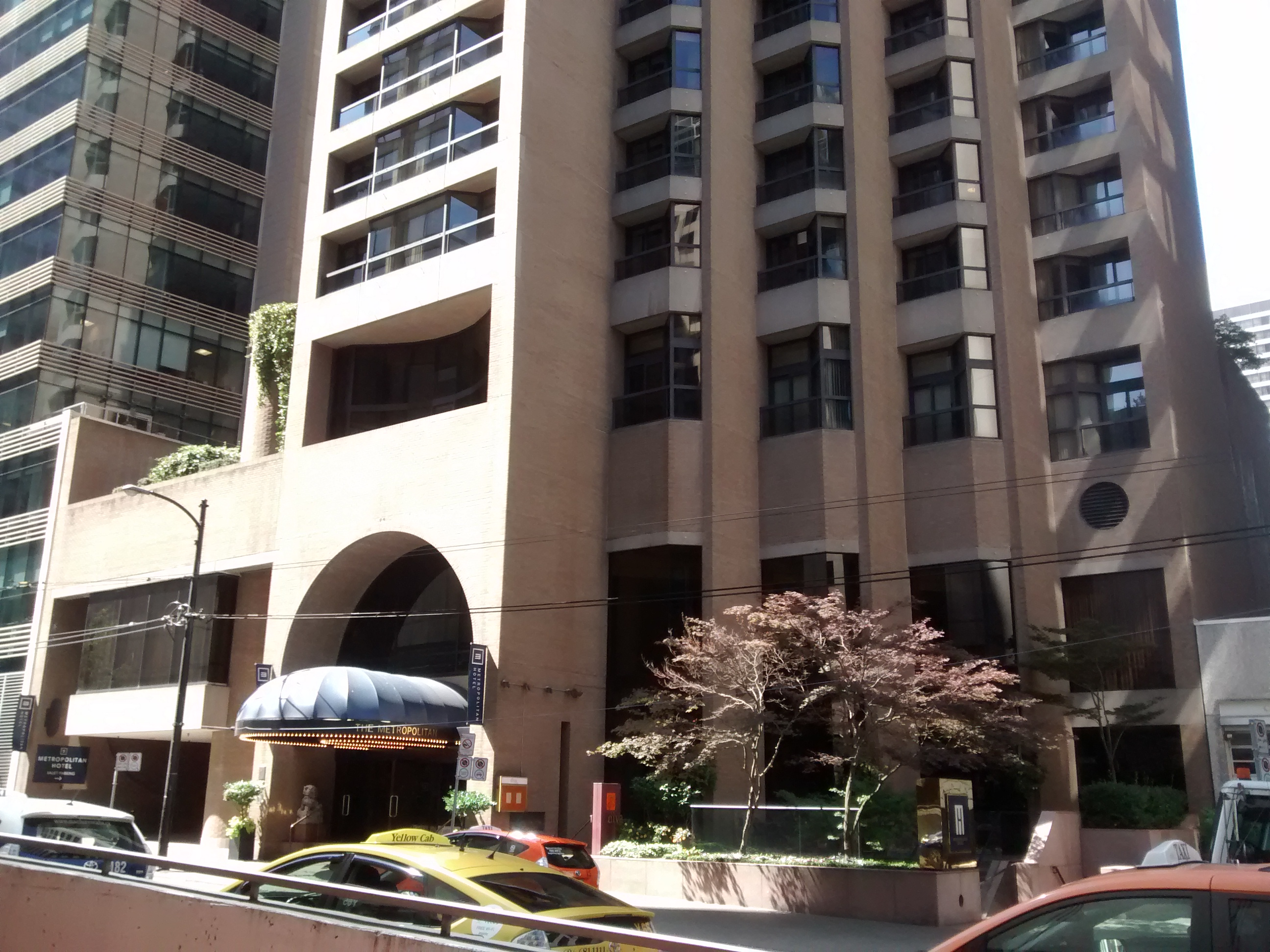

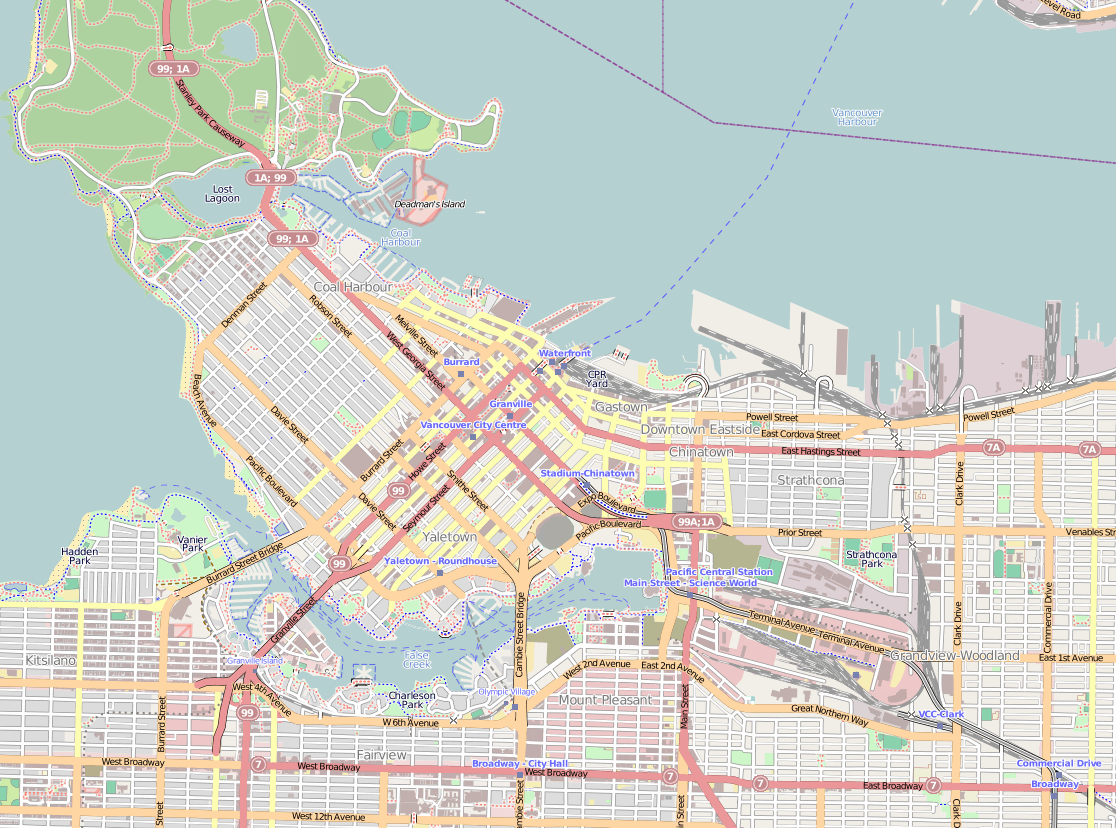
- Location within Downtown Vancouver

General information
- Location: 645 Howe Street; Vancouver, British Columbia; V6C 2Y9
- Coordinates: 49°17′2″N 123°7′5″W

Other information
- Number of rooms: 197

Website
- www.marriott.com/en-us/hotels/yvrbr-metropolitan-hotel-vancouver/overview/

The Metropolitan Hotel Vancouver is a hotel in Vancouver, British Columbia, Canada.

The hotel opened on May 2, 1984 as The Mandarin Vancouver, the first North American property of the Hong Kong–based Mandarin International Hotels chain.

The hotel has 197 rooms and 7,600 square feet of conference and banquet rooms, and its restaurant, Diva, is critically acclaimed, and is headed by chef Dino Renaerts. The hotel, between the financial district and the shopping area of downtown Vancouver, is popular with businesspersons. The decor is French-inspired, with dark wood beams and high ceilings.
