= Shangri-La Kuala Lumpur =

Luxury hotel located in Jalan Sultan Ismail, Kuala Lumpur, Malaysia

- 吉隆坡香格里拉大酒店
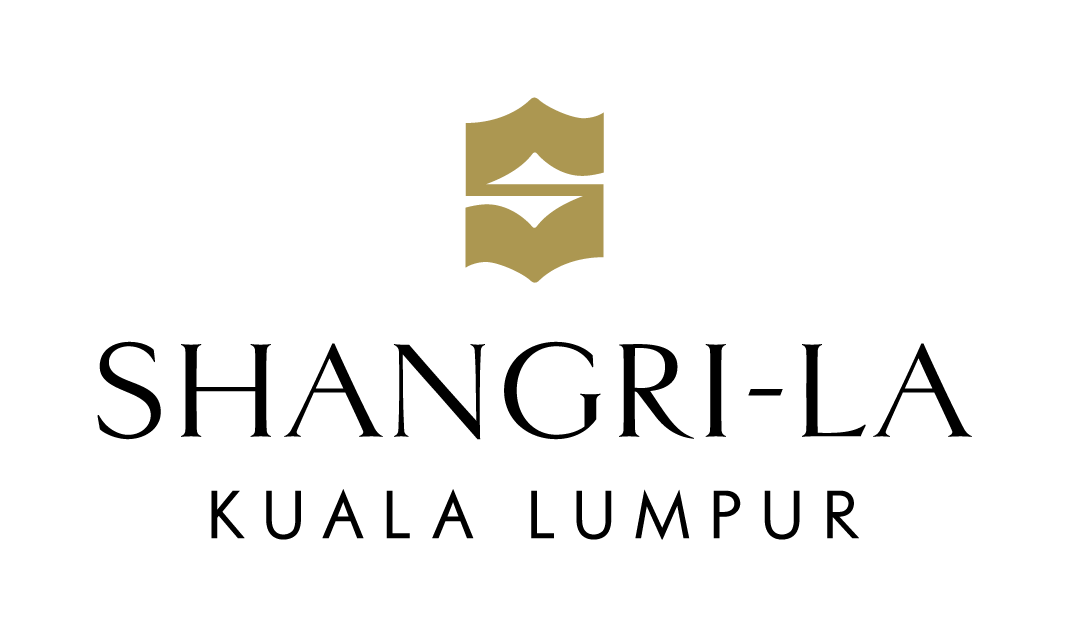

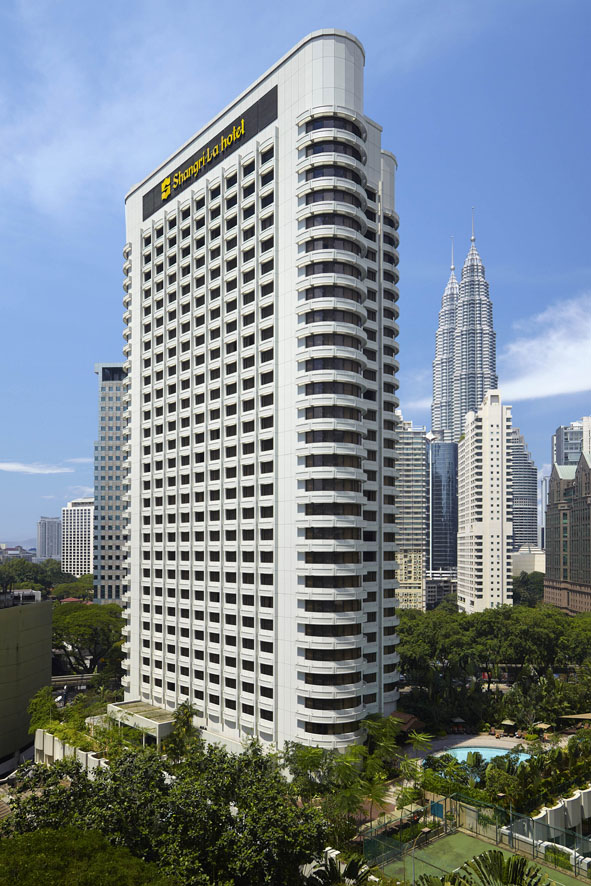
- Shangri-La Kuala Lumpur with the Petronas Towers behind

- Location within Malaysia

General information
- Status: Completed
- Type: Hotel
- Architectural style: High-rise
- Location: 11 Jalan Sultan Ismail, Kuala Lumpur, 50250, Malaysia
- Coordinates: 3°9′15″N 101°42′23″E
- Completed: 1985
- Opening: 20 April 1985
- Management: Shangri-La International Hotel Management Limited

Technical details
- Floor count: 28

Design and construction
- Architect: Kanko Kikaku Sekkeisha Jurubena Bertiga International
- Other designers: Graham Solano

Other information
- Number of rooms: 561
- Number of suites: 101

Website
- Shangri-La Kuala Lumpur

Shangri-La Kuala Lumpur (Chinese: 吉隆坡香格里拉大酒店) is a hotel located in Jalan Sultan Ismail, Kuala Lumpur, Malaysia. It is managed by Shangri-La Hotels and Resorts. The hotel has 662 rooms and suites.

Construction was completed on 19 September 1984 with the opening held on 20 April 1985.

It was voted the best hotel in Kuala Lumpur by public vote at the Kuala Lumpur Mayor's Tourism Awards 2014.

== Design and construction ==
Shangri-La Kuala Lumpur was designed by architects Jurubena Bertiga International of Malaysia, and Kanko Kikaku Sekkeisha of Japan as part of the UBN Complex in the center of the city. It was the first of three buildings in the complex to open, on 20 April 1985, ahead of the 140m 35-floor UBN Tower which open the following year, and the UBN apartments. The original interior design was created by Graham Solano, and the landscape gardening was completed by Belt Collins.

The hotel was refurbished in 2002.

== Features ==
The hotel has 662 rooms of which 101 are suites. The hotel also has seven restaurants and a ballroom.

== Location ==
Shangri-La Kuala Lumpur is on Jalan Sultan Ismail, also known as Treacher Road, in central Kuala Lumpur. The area is named after Sultan Ismail Nasiruddin Shah, the fourth Yang Di Pertuan Agong, and is part of the Kuala Lumpur Inner Ring Road.

== Charitable Works ==
The hotel began a project titled "Gift of Life" in 1985 and has received media attention and the recognition of the Malaysian government for its support of Nor Fatihah Sewah, a girl born without her lower limbs. Through the project, Shangri-La Hotel Kuala Lumpur adopted Nor Fatihah Sewah in 1997 and has sponsored the replacement of her limbs with prosthetics every five years, with the most recent fitting in November 2012.

Malaysia's Tourism Minister Ng Yen Yen brought attention to the hotel's charitable works in 2012 by presenting a check for RM180,000 raised by the hotel to seven children in need of assistance, including Nor Fatihah Sewah. Minister Ng Yen Yen stated that such financial assistance for children in need of aid in Malaysia required the help of non-Governmental organisations such as the Shangri-La Hotel's initiative.

== See also ==
- Shangri-La Hotels and Resorts
- Shangri-La Far Eastern, Taipei
