= Columbia Street (New Westminster) =

Street in New Westminster, British Columbia, Canada

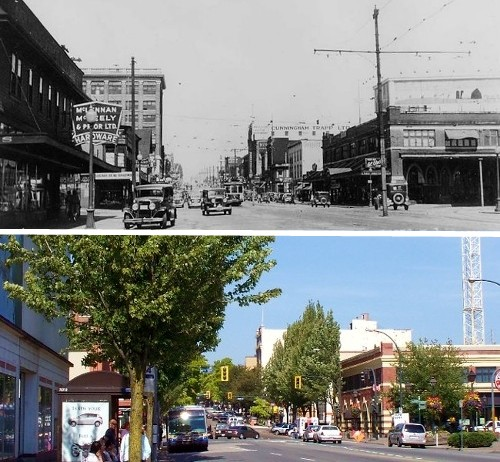
- Contrasting views of Columbia Street in 1932 and 2008
- Length: 5.3 km (3.3 mi)
- Location: New Westminster
- Southwest end: Royal Avenue (becomes Stewardson Way)
- Major junctions: McBride Boulevard (Hwy 1A; Hwy 99A)
- Northeast end: Brunette River (becomes North Road)

Construction
- Construction start: 1850s or 1860s

Columbia Street is the main street in the downtown neighbourhood of New Westminster, British Columbia. It runs parallel to the Fraser River, emerging from Stewardson Way in the southwest portion of New Westminster, travelling through Downtown New Westminster and Sapperton, before crossing the Brunette River and becoming North Road. The section of the street northeast of McBride Boulevard is called East Columbia Street for numbering purposes. The downtown portion of the street is a historic commercial area, and has been nicknamed the Miracle Mile and the Golden Mile.

The 600 and 700 blocks of Columbia Street are home to a large number of bridal stores and galleries, and are occasionally referred to as the Bridal Capital of British Columbia or Wedding Row.

The eastern portion of Columbia Street in Sapperton passes the former site of the British Columbia Penitentiary, the Sapperton Brewery District, and the Royal Columbian Hospital.

== History ==
Columbia Street started to emerge as a transportation corridor and townsite in the 1850s as the city of New Westminster was being developed. It was initially referred to as Richards Street after George Henry Richards, a British hydrographer who surveyed the Fraser River. As the street was lengthened and improved during the 1860s, it was named Columbia Street after the Columbia Detachment of the Royal Engineers, who were responsible for constructing the early British settlements in British Columbia. The street and its buildings were almost entirely destroyed during New Westminster's great fire of 1898, and had to be rebuilt at the beginning of the 20th century. Despite the setback, the area quickly emerged as New Westminster's main commercial and business district.

The famous Wait for Me, Daddy photograph was taken at the corner of Columbia Street and the perpendicular 8th Street, although the photograph does not capture any length of Columbia Street.

New Westminster's first city hall was located at the corner of Columbia Street and 6th Street, prior to its relocation in the 1950s. 502 Columbia Street was the home of an Eaton's until 1977 and was an Army & Navy Store from 1978 until the company's dissolution in 2020.

== Major intersections ==
The entire route is in New Westminster.

km	mi	Destinations	Notes
−2.4	−1.5	Marine Way west – Burnaby Highway 91A south – Richmond, Delta	Continues as Marine Way; becomes Stewardson Way
−2.1	−1.3	20th Street	Near 22nd Street station
−0.2	−0.12	12th Street (becomes Kingsway)	
0.0	0.0	Royal Avenue	Stewardson Way becomes Columbia Street
0.7	0.43	8th Street	Near New Westminster station and Shops at New West
1.0	0.62	6th Street	Near the New Westminster Police Station
1.3	0.81	4th Street	Near Columbia station
2.2	1.4	McBride Boulevard – stal̕əw̓asəm Bridge, Surrey	Becomes E. Columbia Street; former Highway 1A / Highway 99A
2.9	1.8	Richmond Street	Near the former British Columbia Penitentiary
3.5	2.2	Brunette Avenue to Highway 1 (TCH)	Near Sapperton station
4.0	2.5	Royal Columbian Hospital	
4.6	2.9	Braid Street	
5.3	3.3	Crosses Brunette River	
5.3	3.3	North Road north – Coquitlam	Continues as North Road
1.000 mi = 1.609 km; 1.000 km = 0.621 mi: Route transition
