= Royal Oak station (SkyTrain) =

Metro Vancouver SkyTrain station

Royal Oak
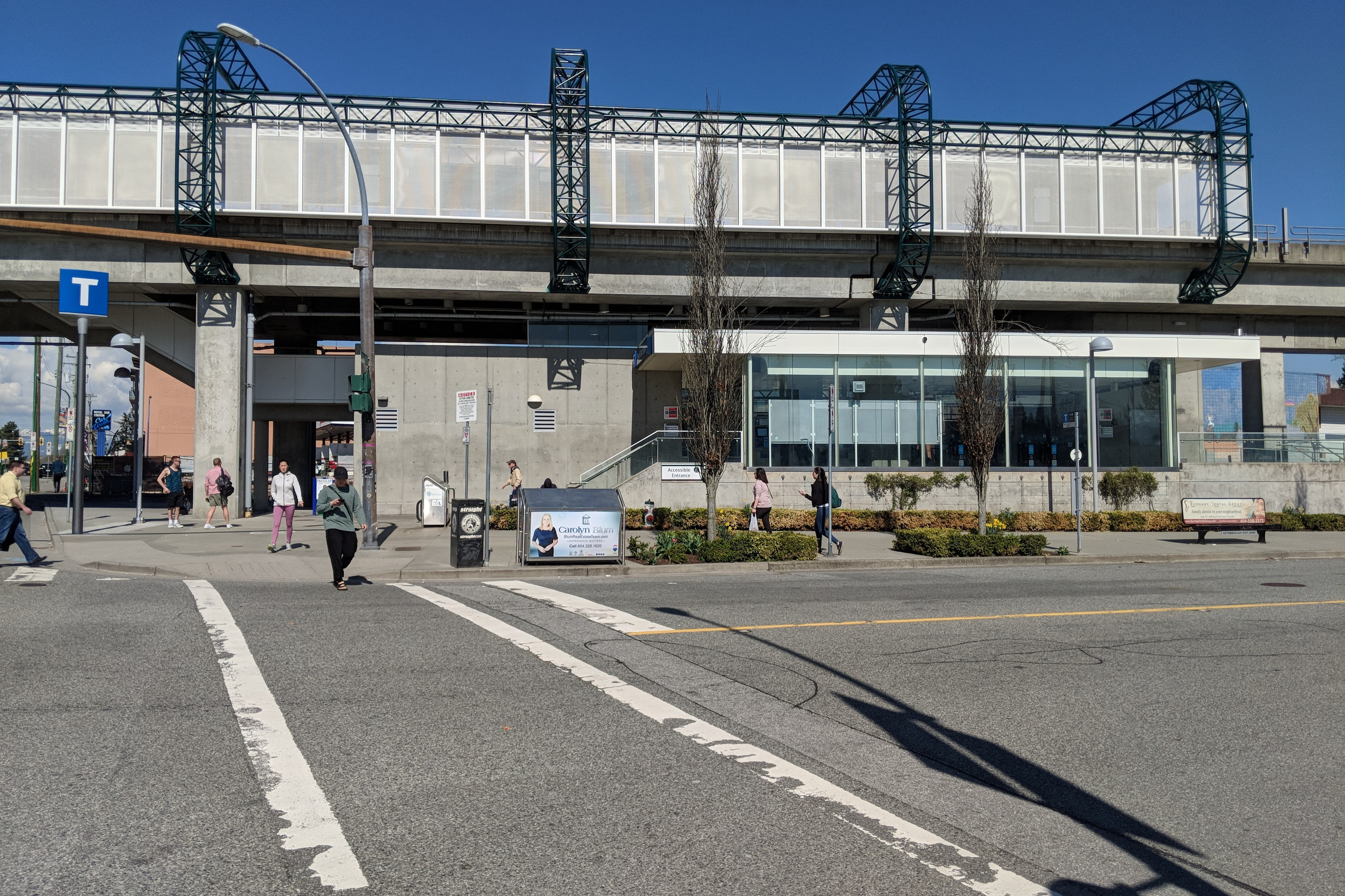
- Station entrance viewed from the southeast corner of Royal Oak Avenue and Beresford Street

General information
- Location: 5199 Beresford Street, Burnaby
- Coordinates: 49°13′12″N 122°59′18″W
- System: SkyTrain station
- Owner: TransLink
- Platforms: Centre platform
- Tracks: 2

Construction
- Structure type: Elevated
- Accessible: yes
- Architect: Architektengruppe U-Bahn

Other information
- Station code: RO
- Fare zone: 2

History
- Opened: December 11, 1985; 40 years ago

Passengers
- 2025: 1,773,000 ▼1.3%
- Rank: 30 of 54

Services
Preceding station	TransLink	Following station
Metrotown towards Waterfront	Expo Line	Edmonds towards King George or Production Way–University
Location

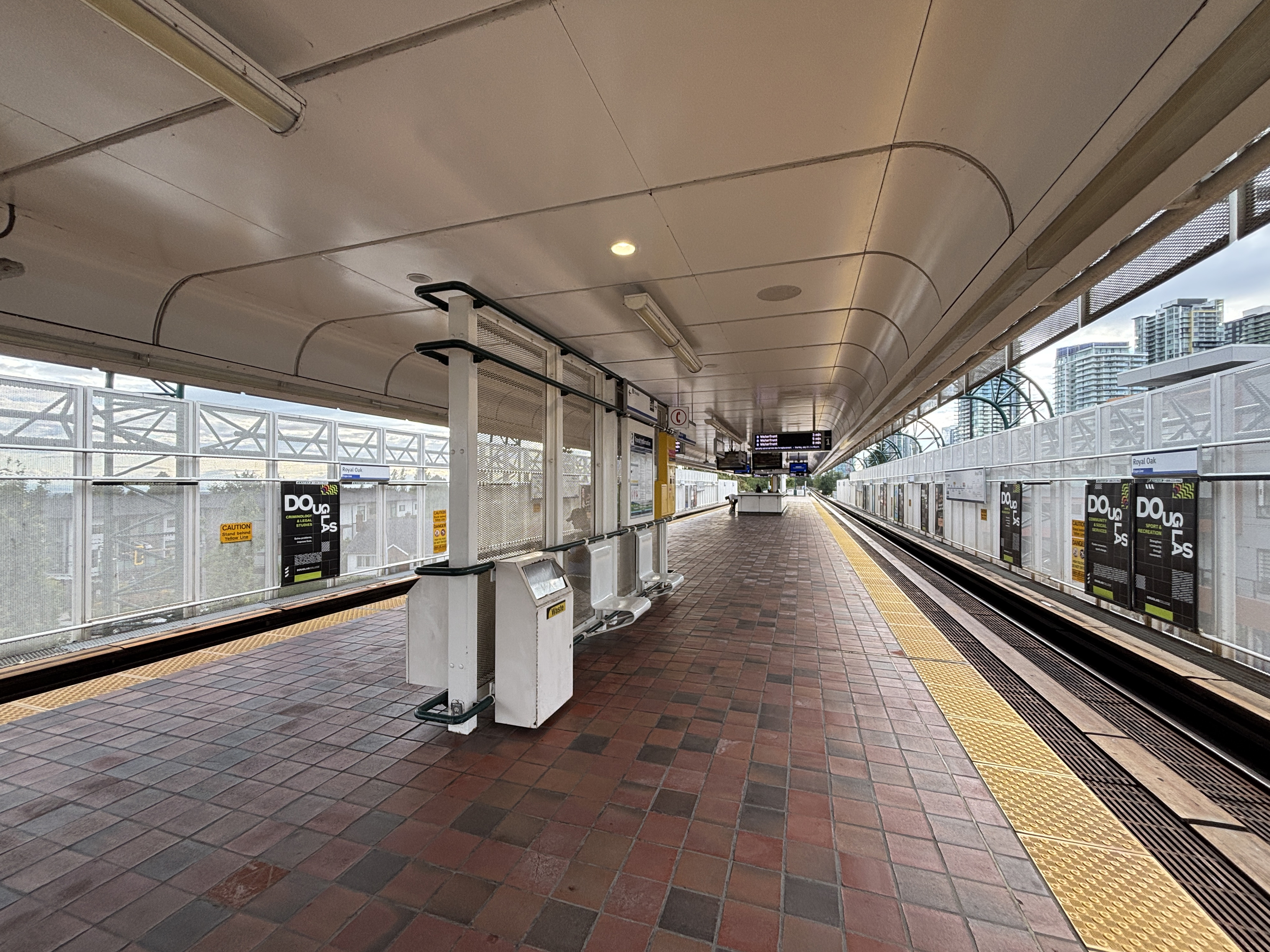
Platform level looking towards Metrotown town centre

Royal Oak is an elevated station on the Expo Line of Metro Vancouver's SkyTrain rapid transit system. The station is located at the intersection of Beresford Street and Royal Oak Avenue in Burnaby, British Columbia, a short walk south of Kingsway and Imperial Avenue.

== History ==
Royal Oak station was opened in 1985 as part of the original SkyTrain system (now known as the Expo Line). The Austrian architecture firm Architektengruppe U-Bahn was responsible for designing the station.

In 2002, Millennium Line service was introduced to the station, which provided outbound service to VCC–Clark station (originally Commercial–Broadway) via Columbia station in New Westminster. This service was discontinued and replaced with an Expo Line branch to Production Way–University station in 2016.

== Station information ==
=== Entrances ===
Royal Oak is served by a single entrance located on the south side of the station at the corner of Beresford Street and Royal Oak Avenue. An elevator is available however there is no escalator to the platform level.

=== Transit connections ===
Royal Oak is served by one bus connection: a community shuttle route to Edmonds station.

Stop number	Routes
59781	148 Edmonds Station
