= Edmonds station (SkyTrain) =

Metro Vancouver SkyTrain station

Edmonds
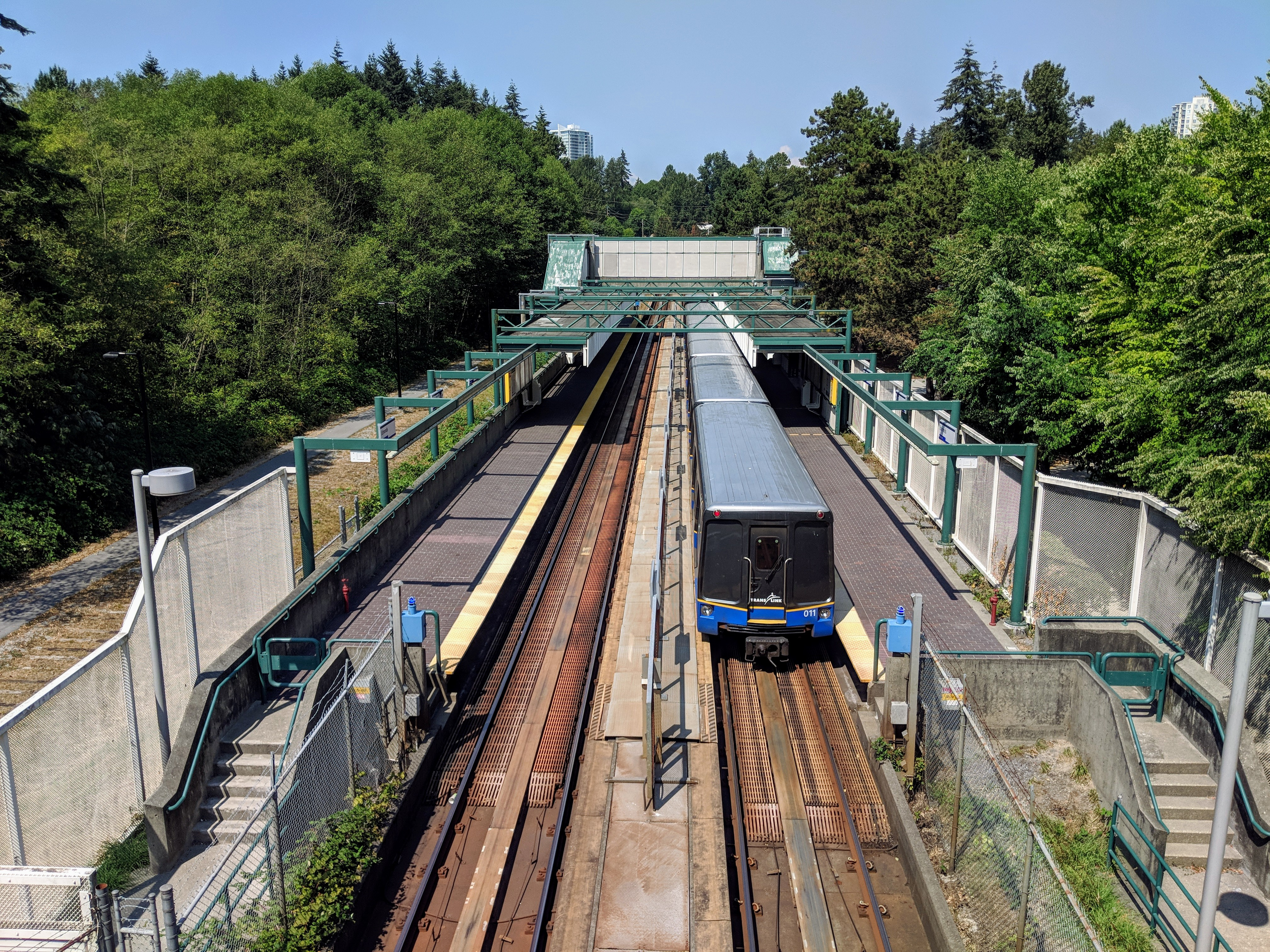

General information
- Location: 6944 18th Avenue, Burnaby
- Coordinates: 49.212054°N 122.959226°W
- System: SkyTrain station
- Owner: TransLink
- Platforms: Side platforms
- Tracks: 2

Construction
- Structure type: At grade
- Accessible: yes

Other information
- Station code: ED
- Fare zone: 2

History
- Opened: December 11, 1985; 40 years ago

Passengers
- 2025: 3,408,000 ▼2.3%
- Rank: 17 of 54

Services
Preceding station	TransLink	Following station
Royal Oak towards Waterfront	Expo Line	22nd Street towards King George or Production Way–University
Location

Edmonds is an at-grade station on the Expo Line of Metro Vancouver's SkyTrain rapid transit system. The station is located southwest of the intersection of Griffiths Drive and 18th Avenue, near Edmonds Street, south of Kingsway in the Edmonds area of Burnaby, British Columbia.

SkyTrain's maintenance and storage facility serving both the Expo and Millennium lines is one block east of this station, linked to and from the main guideway by multiple switch tracks.

== History ==
Edmonds station was built in 1985 as part of the original SkyTrain system (now known as the Expo Line). In 2002, Millennium Line service was introduced to the station, which provided outbound service to VCC–Clark station (originally Commercial) via Columbia station in New Westminster. This service was discontinued and replaced with the Expo Line branch to Production Way–University in 2016.

== Services ==
- Edmonds station bus loop provides services to a number of TransLink bus routes serving Burnaby and New Westminster. It replaced the former Edmonds Loop located northeast of the station, at the intersection of Kingsway and Edmonds.
- Due to the proximity to the maintenance and storage facility, the station serves as the starting point for some early morning outbound Expo trains toward King George station and Production Way–University station.
- The station also serves as a temporary terminus for SkyTrain when trains are taken out of service at the end of morning rush hours.

== Station information ==
=== Entrances ===
The main entrance to the station is located near the northeast end of the platform. It is directly attached to the inbound platform (Platform 1). Passengers using the outbound platform (Platform 2) must use an overhead walkway to cross the tracks. There is no escalator available for the walkway.

Prior to the installation of fare gates, a secondary entrance was located southeast of the main entrance, which also gave access to the inbound platform. It was built by opening up an emergency exit after the station was in operation. Access to the outbound platform had to use the same walkway as the main entrance.

=== Transit connections ===
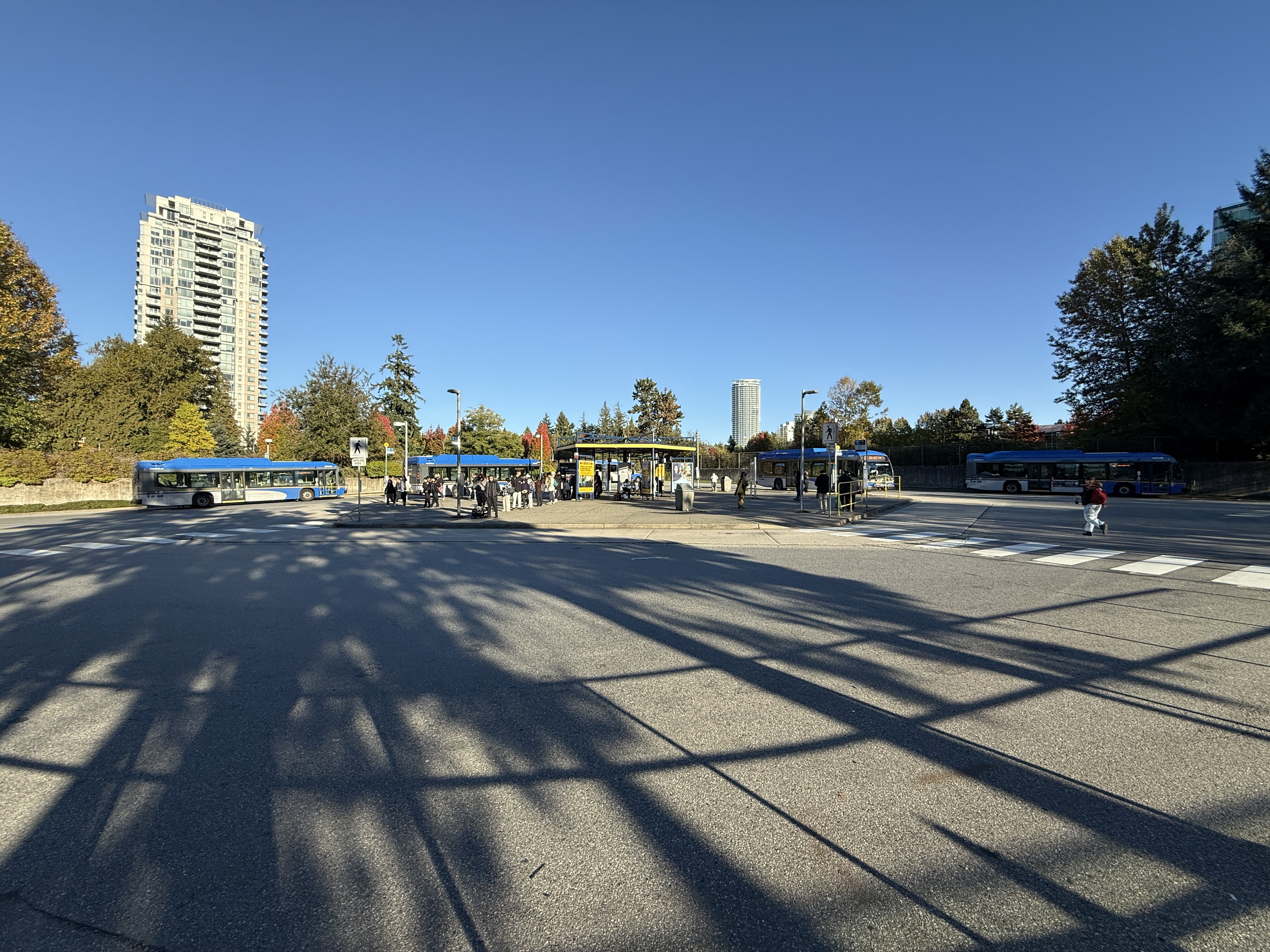
Edmonds station bus loop

Edmonds station provides an off-street transit exchange at the northeast side of the station, at the end of 18th Avenue. Bus bay assignments is as follows:

Bay	Routes	Destinations
1		Unloading only
2	133	Holdom Station
3	119	Metrotown Station
4	106	New Westminster Station
5	112	New Westminster Station
6	116	Metrotown Station
7	147 148	Metrotown Station Royal Oak Station
	HandyDART	
