= 22nd Street station (SkyTrain) =

Metro Vancouver SkyTrain station

22nd Street
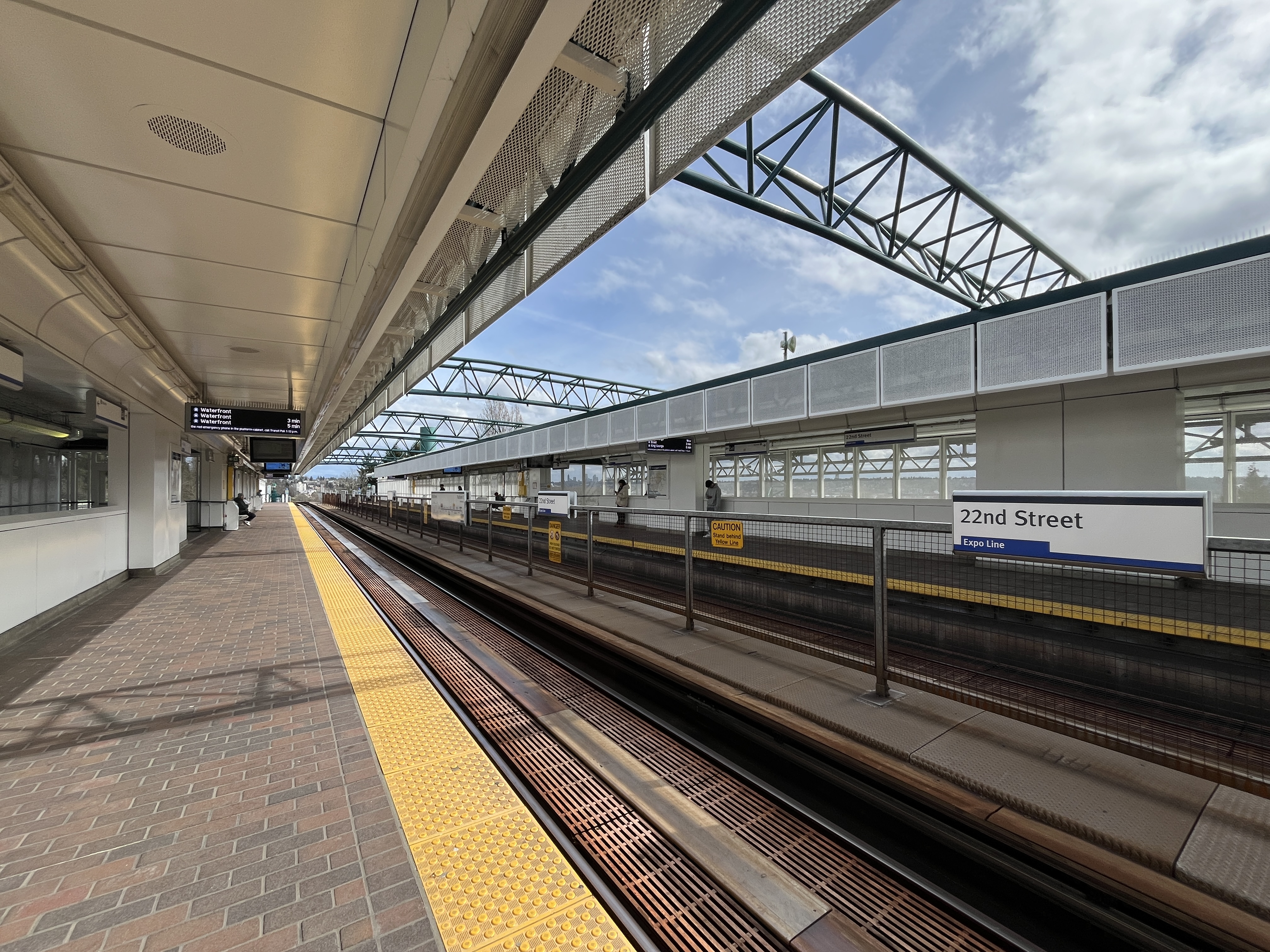
- Platform level at 22nd Street station in 2026

General information
- Location: 649 22nd Street, New Westminster
- Coordinates: 49°12′00″N 122°56′57″W
- System: SkyTrain station
- Owner: TransLink
- Platforms: Side platforms
- Tracks: 2

Construction
- Structure type: Elevated
- Accessible: yes
- Architect: Architektengruppe U-Bahn

Other information
- Station code: TS
- Fare zone: 2

History
- Opened: December 11, 1985; 40 years ago

Passengers
- 2025: 3,205,000 ▼6.5%
- Rank: 19 of 54

Services
Preceding station	TransLink	Following station
Edmonds towards Waterfront	Expo Line	New Westminster towards King George or Production Way–University
Location

22nd Street is an elevated station on the Expo Line of Metro Vancouver's SkyTrain rapid transit system. It is located on 7th Avenue and 22nd Street in the Connaught Heights neighbourhood of New Westminster, British Columbia, Canada. Due to its proximity to the Queensborough interchange, where the Queensborough Bridge meets with Stewardson and Marine Ways, the station serves as a hub for regional bus routes.

== History ==
22nd Street station was opened in 1985 as part of the original SkyTrain system (now known as the Expo Line). The Austrian architecture firm Architektengruppe U-Bahn was responsible for designing the station.

In 2002, Millennium Line service was introduced to the station, which provided outbound service to VCC–Clark station (originally Commercial Drive) via Columbia station in New Westminster. This service was discontinued and replaced with an Expo Line branch to Production Way–University station in 2016.

In February 2019, upgrades began on the station's bus exchange, which included adding enhanced lighting and a larger waiting area to reduce overcrowding. In April 2019, TransLink installed its first-ever charging station for its future fleet of battery electric buses at the station's bus exchange. Construction on the $2.8-million upgrade was completed in July 2019.

== Services ==
- 22nd Street bus loop is the terminus for a number of various regional bus routes serving Vancouver, Surrey, North Delta, Richmond and Langley.
- Local connections to Queensborough Landing and Uptown New Westminster are also available at this station.

== Station information ==
=== Entrances ===
22nd Street station is served by a single entrance facing west. The entrance, along with the bus loop that surrounds the stationhouse, is at a level slightly below 7th Avenue and is connected to the street by a ramp and stairs. An up escalator is provided for the westbound (inbound) platform only. Both platforms are wheelchair accessible via elevator.

=== Transit connections ===
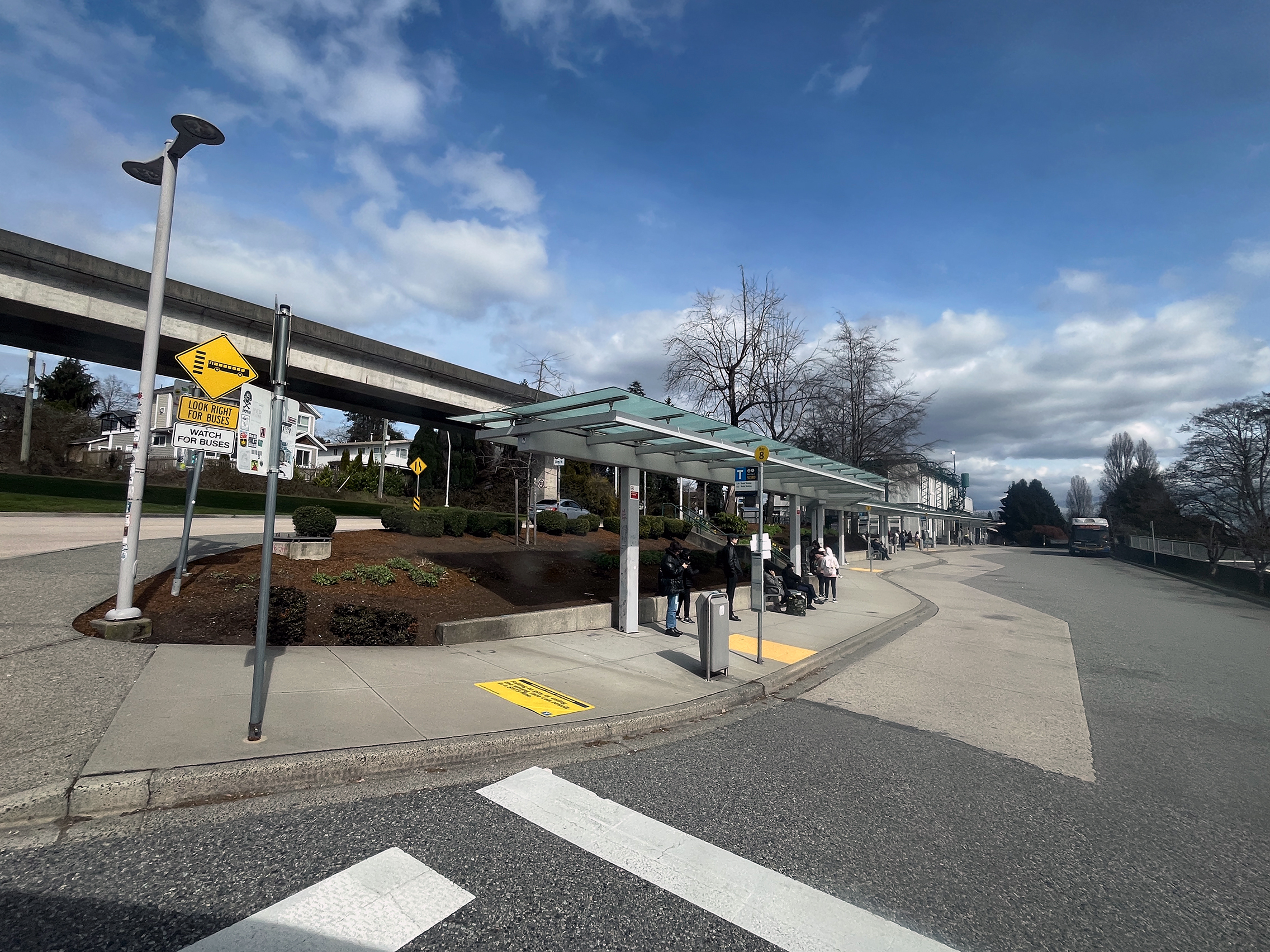
Off-street bus exchange outside station

22nd Street station offers an off-street transit exchange with on-street stops for HandyDART and bus drop-offs eastbound on 7th Avenue. Bus bay assignment is as follows:

Bay	Route	Destination	Notes
1			Electric buses only
2			Electric buses only
3	104	Annacis Island	
4	410	Brighouse Station	
4	418	Kingswood	Peak hours only (Monday to Friday only; first and third bus to Gifford only)
5	101	Lougheed Station	
6	100	Marpole Loop	
7	340	Scottsdale	
7	388	Carvolth Exchange	Peak hours only (Monday to Friday only)
8	128	Braid Station	Via 8th Avenue
8	155	Braid Station	Via Hospital and 6th Avenue
9			Unloading only (no layover)
9			HandyDART
