= Sapperton, New Westminster =

Neighbourhood in British Columbia, Canada

Sapperton
- Neighbourhood
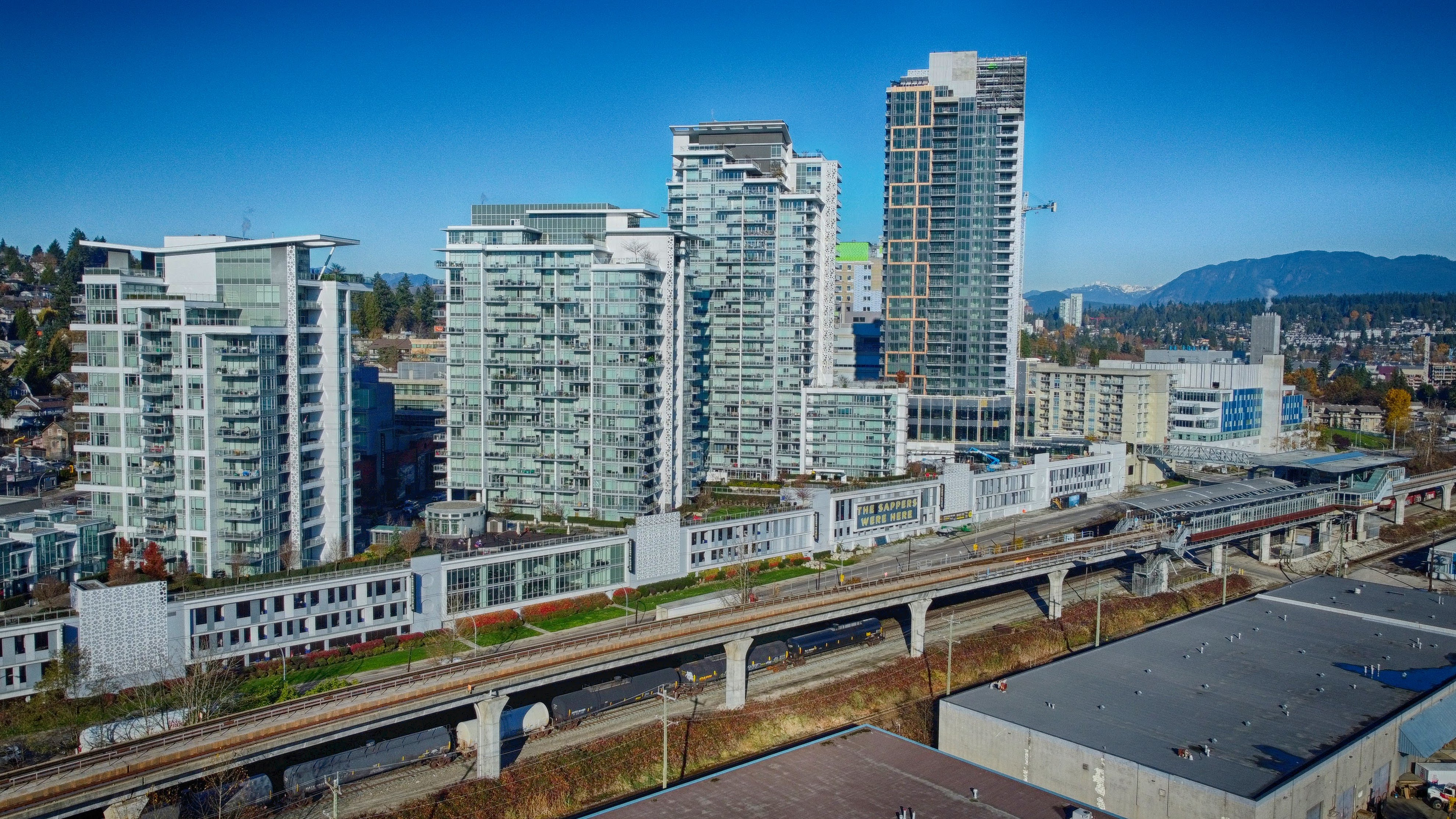
- Brewery District in Sapperton
- Etymology: The Royal Engineers, who were often referred to as "Sappers".
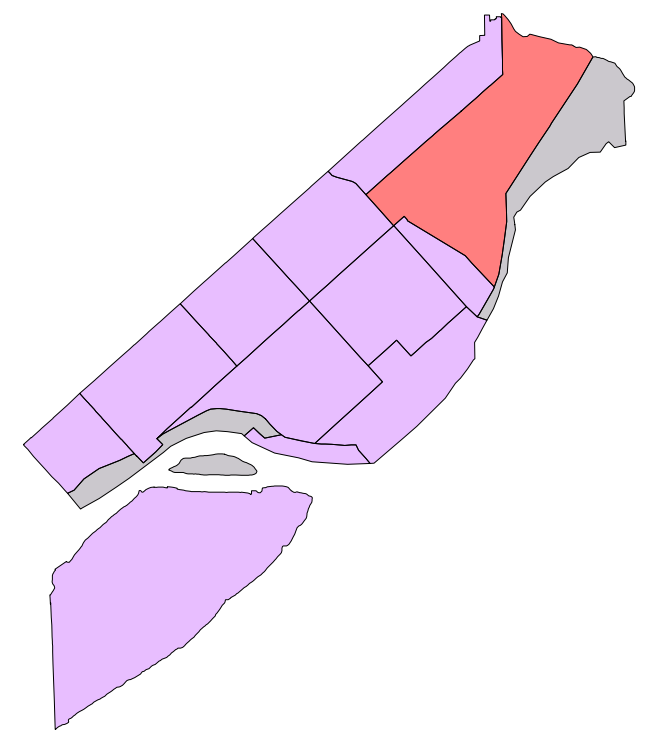
- Location of Sapperton shown in red

- Sapperton in Greater Vancouver
- Country: Canada
- Province: British Columbia
- Regional District: Metro Vancouver
- City: New Westminster
- Established: 1860; 1889 (incorporated into New Westminster)
- Founder: Colonel Richard Moody

Sapperton is a neighbourhood within the City of New Westminster, British Columbia, Canada, located in the northeastern part of the city, which borders the areas of Coquitlam and Burnaby. It is located on the slope above the Fraser River, which is mainly concentrated on Brunette Avenue and Columbia Street and is also northeast of the former British Columbia Penitentiary.

The neighbourhood was the location of the barracks and other housing for the Royal Engineers, Columbia Detachment, otherwise known as “sappers”. The Royal Columbian Hospital is located in Sapperton. The neighbourhood of Sapperton consists of Sapperton and Hume Park, that has a forested area leading to the Brunette River. Sapperton is also located close to two SkyTrain stations, Sapperton station and Braid station.

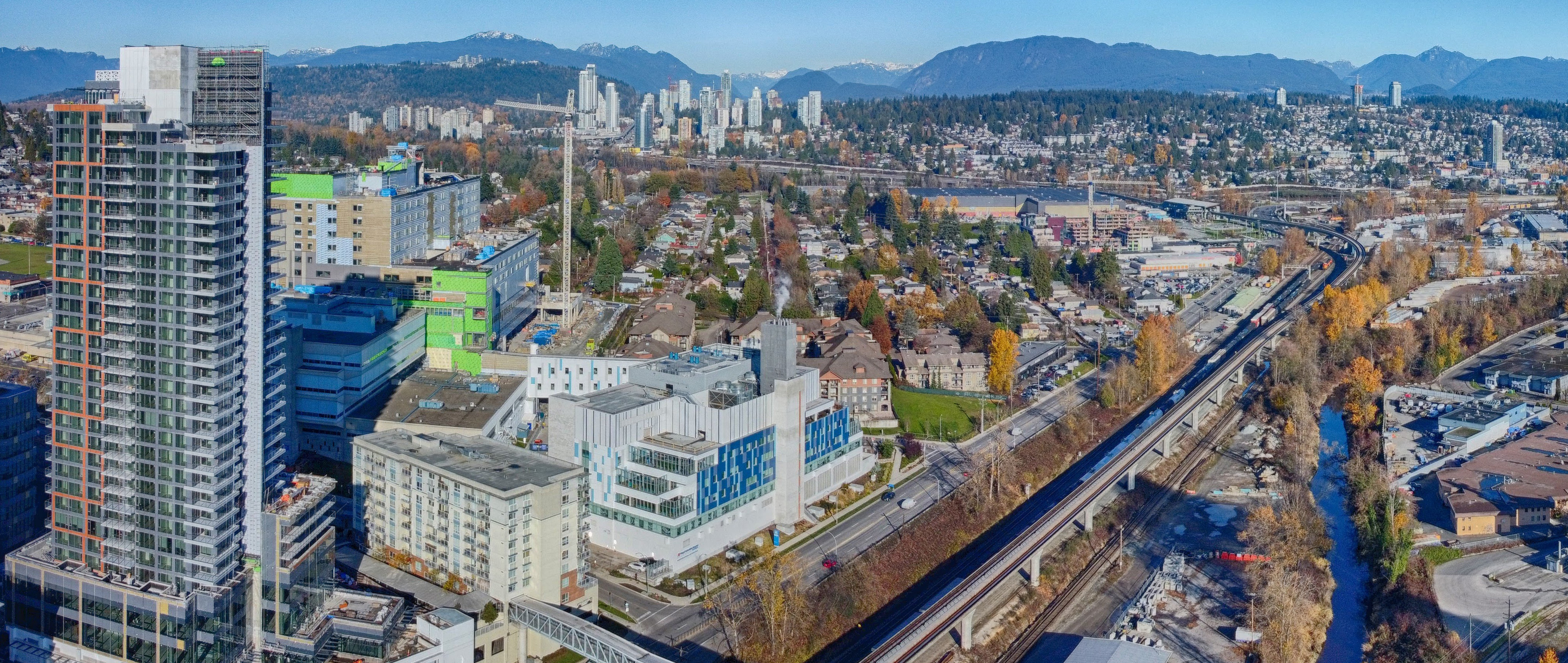
Aerial view of Sapperton in 2023
