= Columbia Street =

Columbia Street may refer to:

- Columbia Street (New Westminster), a street in New Westminster, British Columbia, Canada
- A section of Avenue D in Manhattan, New York
- Columbia Street Waterfront District, a neighborhood in Brooklyn, New York City
