= Sapperton station =

Metro Vancouver SkyTrain station

Sapperton
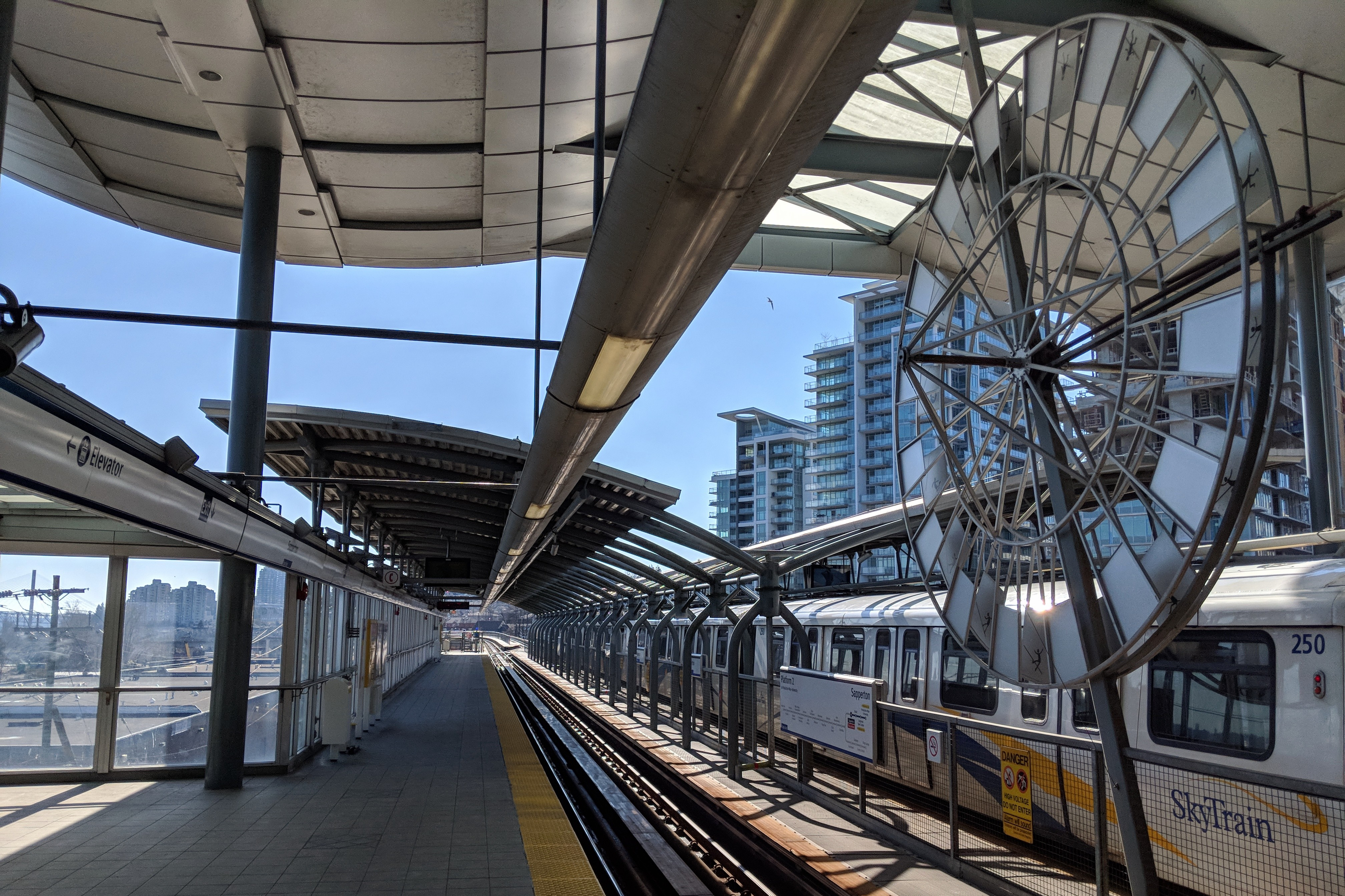
- Platform level at Sapperton station

General information
- Location: 20 Spruce Street, New Westminster
- Coordinates: 49.22443°N 122.88964°W
- System: SkyTrain station
- Owner: TransLink
- Platforms: Side platforms
- Tracks: 2

Construction
- Structure type: Elevated
- Accessible: yes
- Architect: Hancock Bruckner Eng & Wright

Other information
- Station code: SA
- Fare zone: 2

History
- Opened: January 2, 2002

Passengers
- 2025: 979,000 ▲0.8%
- Rank: 44 of 54

Services
Preceding station	TransLink	Following station
Columbia towards Waterfront	Expo Line Lougheed branch	Braid towards Production Way–University
Location

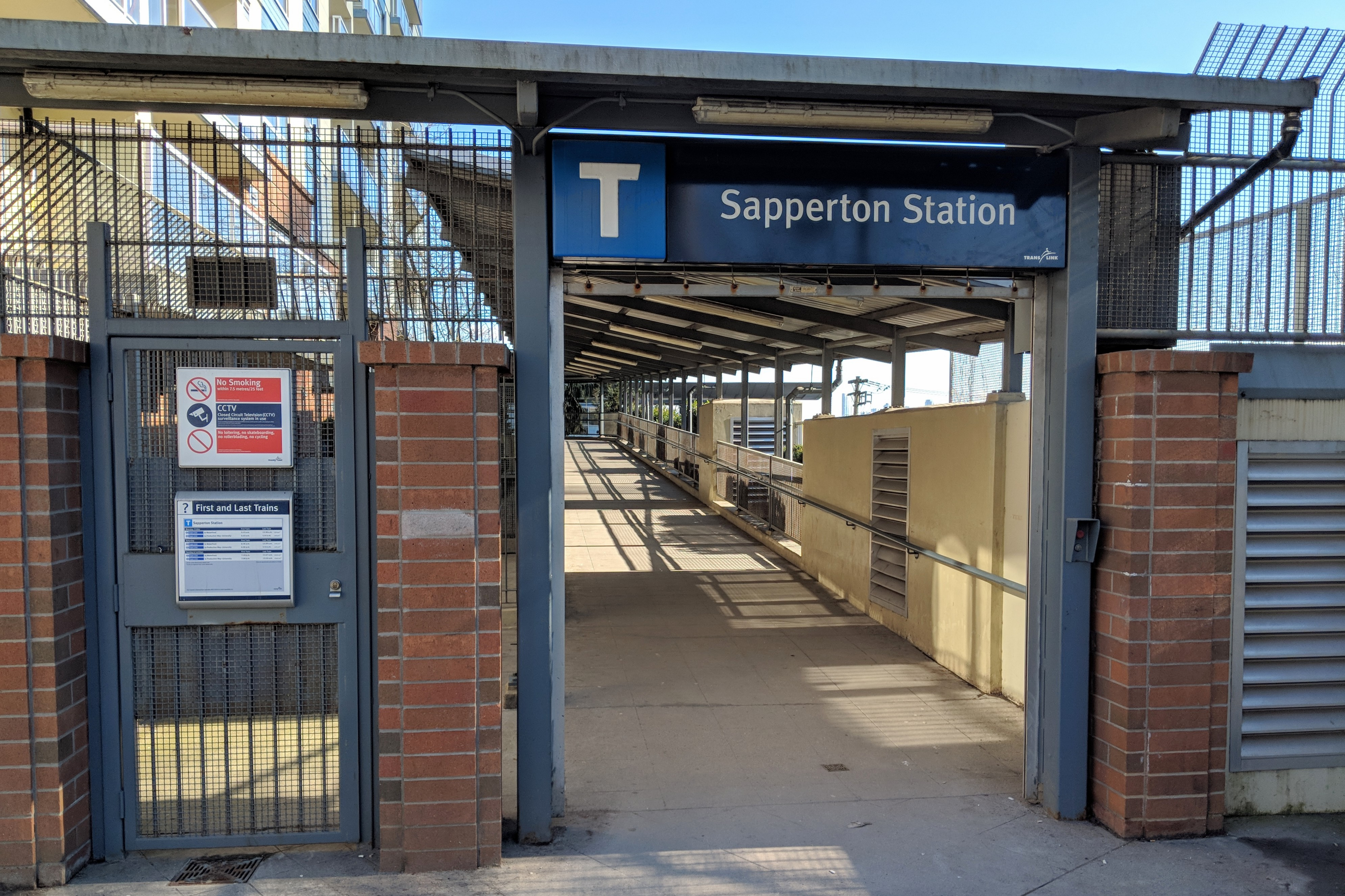
Keary Street entrance

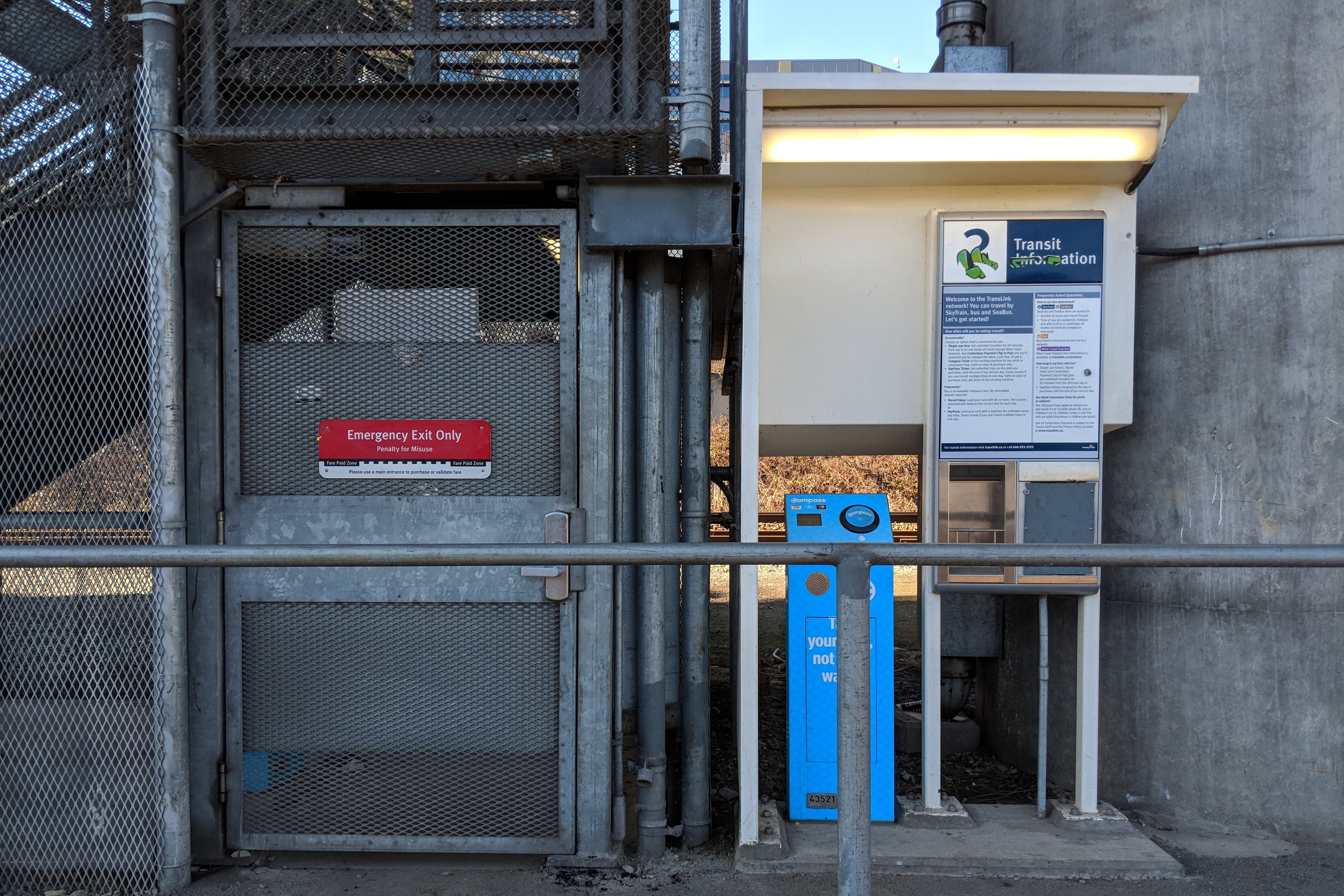
Spruce Street entrance

Sapperton is an elevated station on the Expo Line of Metro Vancouver's SkyTrain rapid transit system. The station is located on Brunette Avenue, above a Canadian Pacific Kansas City rail right-of-way in the Sapperton neighbourhood in New Westminster, British Columbia, Canada. Located nearby is the Royal Columbian Hospital. TransLink's head offices are also located within the vicinity of the station.

== History ==
The station was opened in 2002 as part of the original Millennium Line project. Before the first phase of the line was completed, a short spur from Columbia station was opened in eastern New Westminster as a test track; this spur included Sapperton and Braid stations.

In 2004, work was done on the platform tiles to make the surface less slippery.

In 2016, SkyTrain service was reconfigured in anticipation of the opening of the Evergreen Extension; as a result, Millennium Line service was discontinued at Sapperton station. Since October 22, 2016, Sapperton has been served by an Expo Line branch with service between Waterfront and Production Way–University stations.

== Structure and design ==
Sapperton station was designed by the architecture firm Hancock Bruckner Eng & Wright and, like all stations constructed as part of the original Millennium Line, has a unique design. The elevated station contains a mezzanine level connected to the platform level by stairs, escalators and elevators. There are two side platforms, separated by an artwork wheel. There was previously a stationary bike on the mezzanine level which would rotate the artwork wheel when ridden, but it was removed after it was vandalized.

== Station information ==
=== Entrances ===
Sapperton station is served by one official entrance. It is located at the northeast end of the station. This entrance is connected to ground level by a walkway over Brunette Avenue that exits on Keary Street, across from the Royal Columbian Hospital.

A second, unofficial entrance is at the south end of the station and is not wheelchair accessible. This entrance is technically an emergency exit that leads down from platform 1, but people commonly use it as a safe way to access the station from Spruce Street, which is next to the station but not accessible using the main entrance. TransLink nevertheless installed Compass card readers at the site.

=== Transit connections ===
Sapperton station is not served directly by any bus routes. Connections can be made to the 109 bus route, a short walk from the station at the intersection of Columbia Street and Keary Street:

Stop number	Routes
53111	109 Lougheed Station
53218	109 New Westminster Station
