= Mary Steinhauser =

Canadian social worker

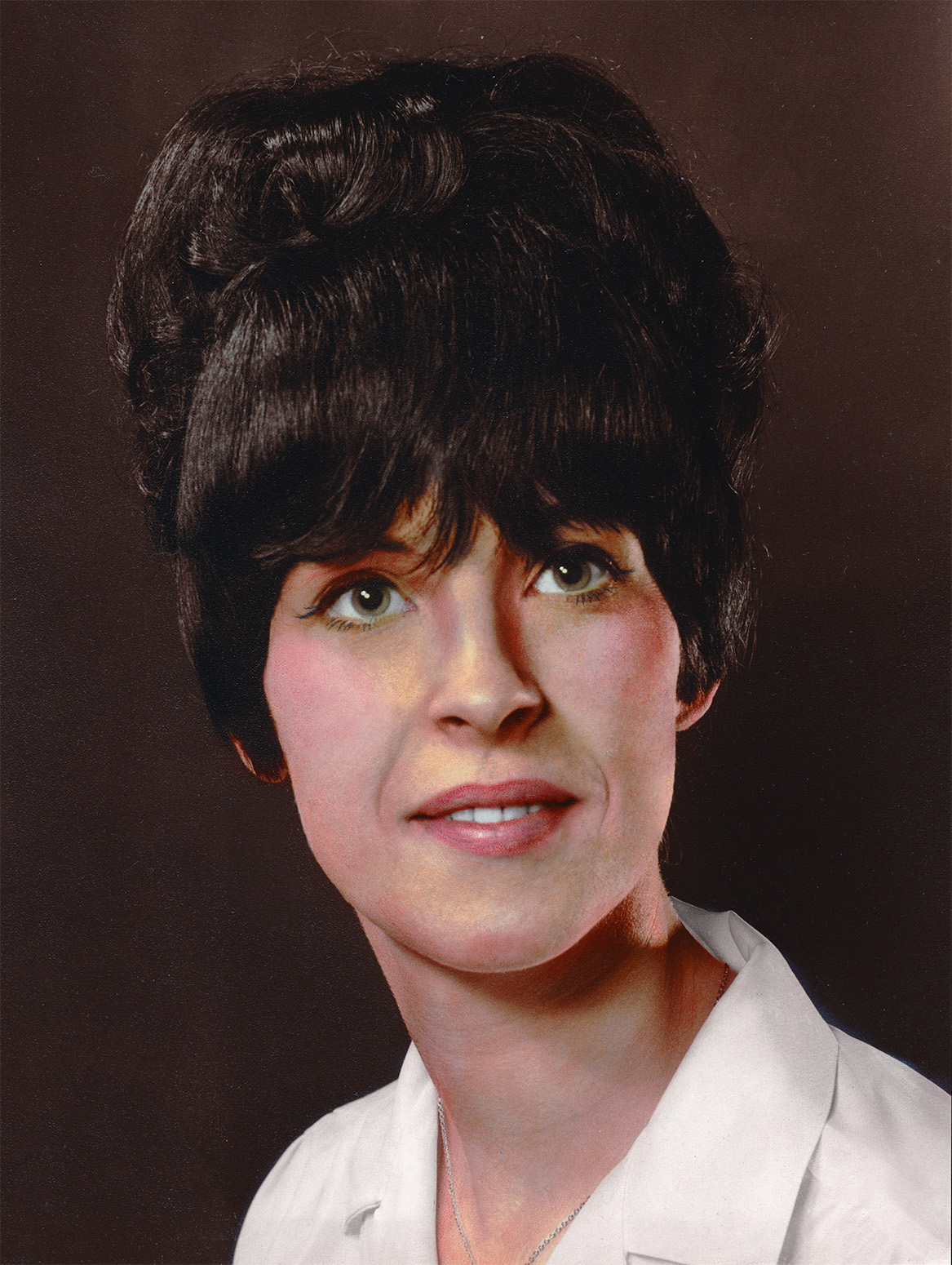
- Born: Mary Elizabeth Steinhauser; August 25, 1942; Duncan, British Columbia, Canada
- Died: June 11, 1975 (aged 32); New Westminster, British Columbia, Canada
- Education: BA in Psychology, Simon Fraser University; MA in Social Work, University of British Columbia
- Occupations: Psychiatric nurse, social worker, prison classification officer, Canadian Peace Officer
- Known for: Prison Justice Advocacy
- Relatives: Margaret (sister), Louisa Franz and Erica Franz (nieces

Mary Steinhauser (August 25, 1942 – June 11, 1975) was a Canadian social worker and prison classification officer who was killed during a hostage-taking at the British Columbia Penitentiary in 1975. On June 9, 1975, Steinhauser was one of fifteen people that were taken hostage by three inmates—Andy Bruce, Dwight Lucas and Claire Wilson—who were attempting a prison breakout. Prior to the hostage-taking and her death, Steinhauser was an outspoken advocate against solitary confinement.

A bursary was opened in Steinhauser's name and benefits Simon Fraser University Aboriginal Undergraduate Students in Arts & Social Sciences.

== Personal life ==
Mary Steinhauser was born in Duncan, British Columbia, on August 25, 1942, to August Steinhauser and Johanna Reisner. She was the eldest daughter of two children. Her father emigrated to Canada in 1925 from Ravensburg, Germany, and made a living as a farmer in Edmonton, Alberta, and subsequently moved to Lake Cowichan, British Columia, where he worked in the sawmill. Her mother immigrated to Canada in 1939 from Vienna. Steinhauser's parents married in 1941.

Steinhauser grew up in Lake Cowichan until she was five years old, when she moved with her family to the town Burton, in the West Kootenays, where her parents had purchased a farm. Upon graduation from secondary school in Nakusp, she began her training as a psychiatric nurse at Essondale. After working at Essondale for two years, Steinhauser moved to Toronto and worked as a nurse at the Queen Street Mental Health Hospital for one year. Following this employment, she returned to British Columbia and took up nursing duties at Tranquille School for the mentally handicapped in Kamloops, holding this job for two years.

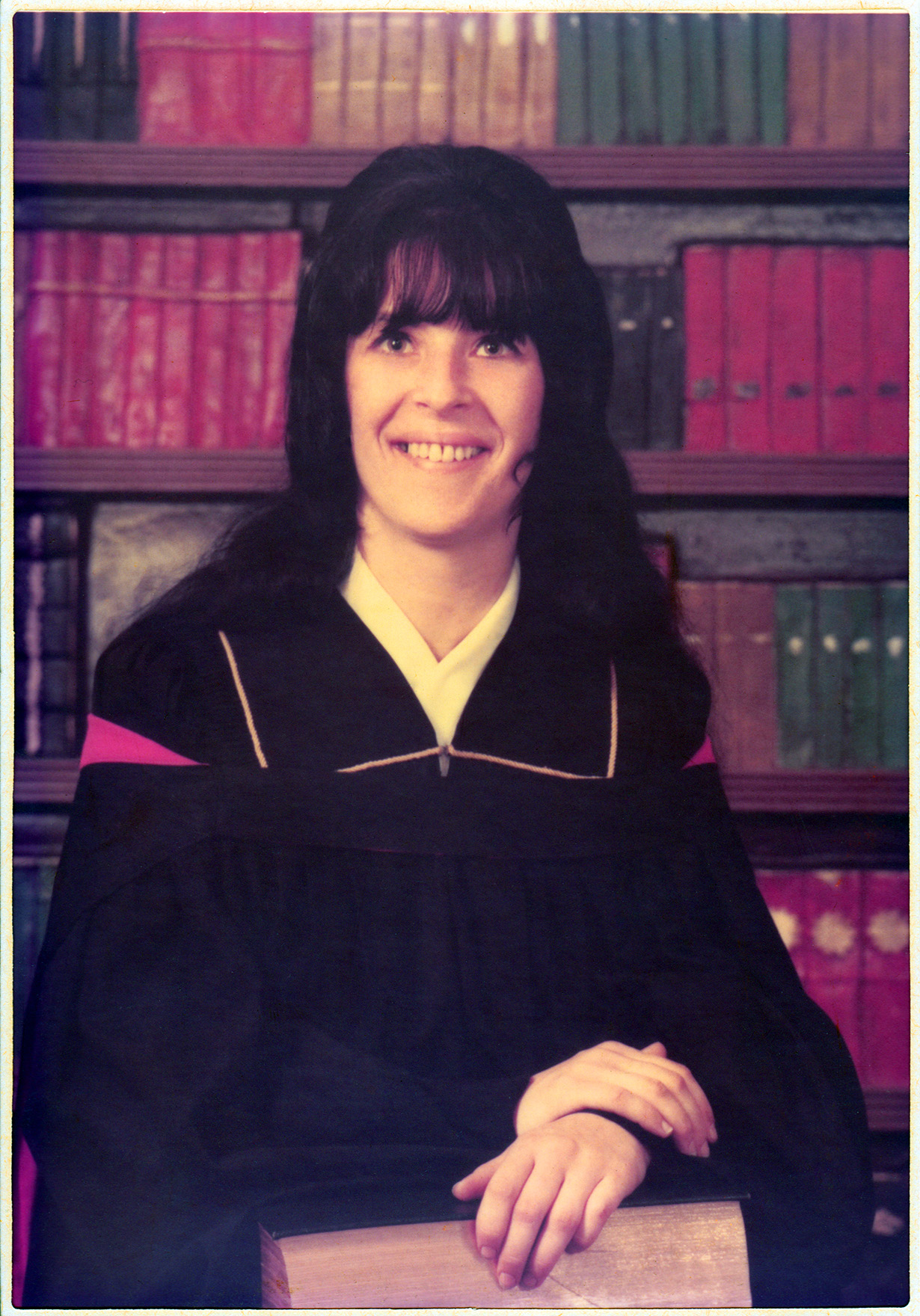
Steinhauser on her graduation from the University of British Columbia in 1973

Steinhauser eventually began work as a psychiatric nurse for the Matsqui Institution, a newly opened medium security prison in Matsqui. From 1967 to 1970 she studied psychology and sociology at Simon Fraser University, where she graduated in 1971 with a BA (Honours) in Psychology and Sociology. Immediately after attaining her degree, she began graduate studies at the University of British Columbia in social work; Mary was awarded her Master of Social Work degree in May 1973.

== Hostage-taking incident ==
On June 9, 1975, inmates Andy Bruce, Dwight Lucas and Claire Wilson, inmates at the British Columbia Penitentiary, made an unsuccessful attempt to escape from prison and took fifteen people hostage. Steinhauser, who was taken captive at knifepoint, volunteered to be the principal hostage, which meant that she was held in a room outside the vault area where the other hostages were kept. The three inmates made several demands, including medical examinations for Lucas and Bruce, access to hot and cold water in isolation cells and restoration of recreation yard privileges for segregated prisoners. They also demanded safe passage out of the country.

The hostage stand-off lasted for forty-one hours. During this time, the inmates kept their hostages in the penitentiary's vault, with the exception of Mary. At approximately 1 A.M. on June 11, one of the hostages tried to overpower the inmates in an attempt to escape, after which point all of the hostages except Steinhauser retreated to the vault, where they locked themselves inside. Soon after, a tactical squad of prison officers attempted to rescue the hostages and fired upon the hostage-takers. Steinhauser, who was being held as a human shield in front of Bruce, was fatally shot in the process.

Police Chief Rod Keary initially informed reporters that prior to her shooting, Steinhauser had been stabbed by the inmates, per reports from the other hostages. This was proven to be erroneous by the coroner's report, which stated that Steinhauser had received two bullet wounds and also had abrasions, bruising and recent needle marks in both forearms.

At the inquest following the shooting, it was alleged that prison guard Albert Hollinger (who was identified by Bruce) was the officer who shot Steinhauser. It was also alleged that Hollinger had deliberately switched up the tactical team's guns in an attempt to keep from being identified as the shooter while claiming that he was collecting the guns in order to keep them away from prisoners.

In January 1976, Bruce appeared in a New Westminster provincial court, where he gave his account of the hostage-taking to Judge Philip Govan. Bruce said that after the tactical squad arrived all of the hostages except for Steinhauser shut themselves inside the vault. According to Bruce, the other hostages "acted out of fear; their only concern was to get that vault door shut and keep it shut." Bruce went on to allege that, after being shot twice in the jaw by a prison guard he identified as Hollinger, Steinhauser crawled in front him, where "she screamed, 'Don't shoot him.'" After this, according to Bruce's testimony, Hollinger shot and killed Steinhauser.

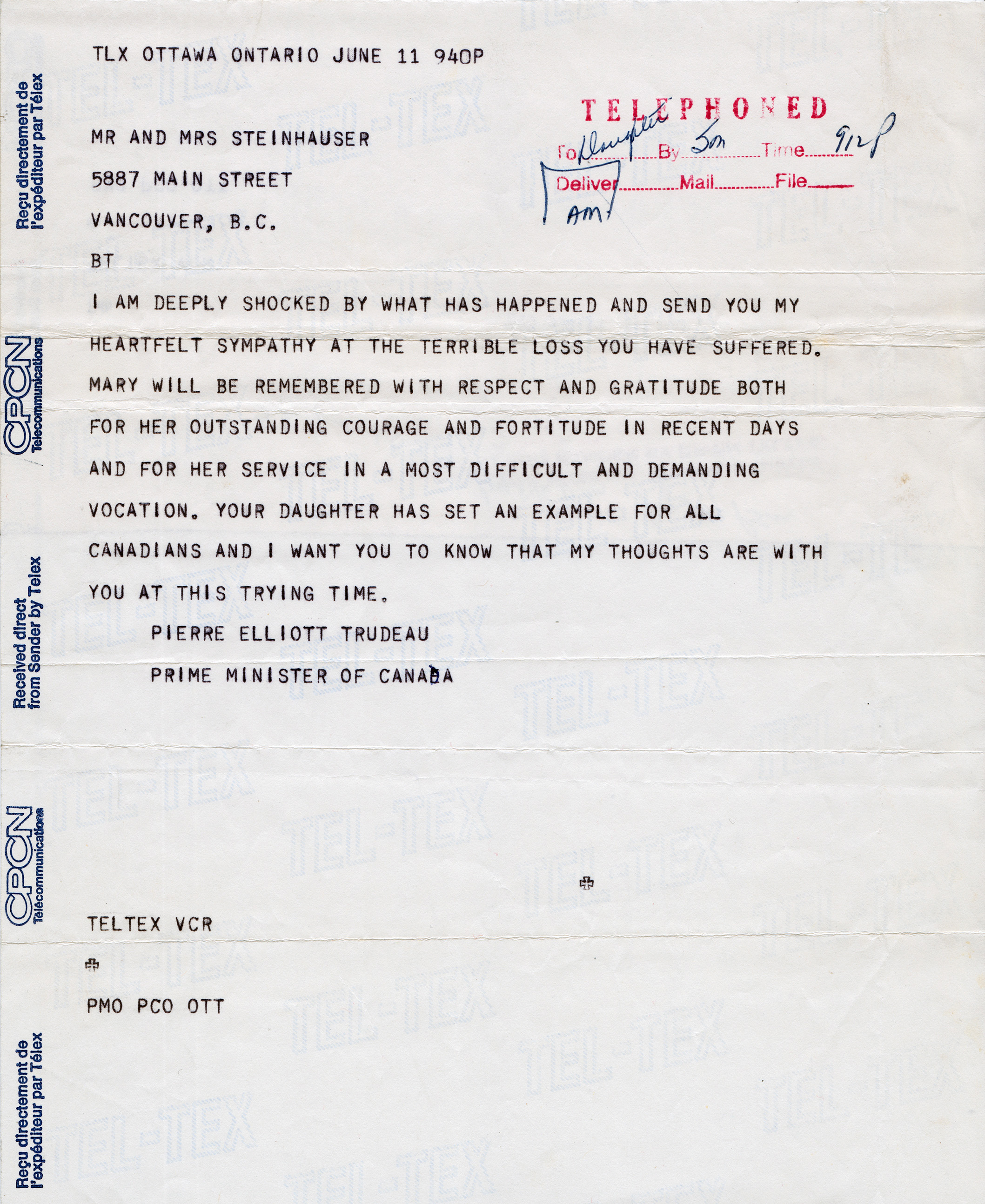
The telegraph sent on June 11, 1975 by then Prime Minister Pierre Elliott Trudeau to Mary Steinhauser's parents in response to the news of Mary's death.

== Government response ==
In an interview on June 11, 1975, Canadian Prime Minister Pierre Trudeau commented on the hostage-taking incident, stating how "very sorry" he felt about Steinhauser's death and discussing the federal government's commitment to not letting the inmates escape: "To make sure these guys wouldn't get off with anything...we would hound them wherever they were."

== Legal consequences ==
In July 1976, a jury ruled that the shooting was not intentional and that the guards, including Hollinger, were acting under the belief that Steinhauser's life was actively being threatened by the inmates. The jury further recommended that future, similar incidents be handled by outside teams that have been trained in hostage situations.

== In media ==
- The play One Tiger to a Hill by Sharon Pollock is loosely based on the incident.
- The incident was fictionalized in Christian Bruyère's play Walls and its film adaptation Walls. The Steinhauer role in those works was given the name Joan Tremblay, and was played by Andrée Pelletier in the film.
- In 2014 a stage performance entitled Brave: The Mary Steinhauser Legacy was held at the Terry Fox Theatre in Port Coquitlam.
