= New Westminster station =

Metro Vancouver SkyTrain station

New Westminster
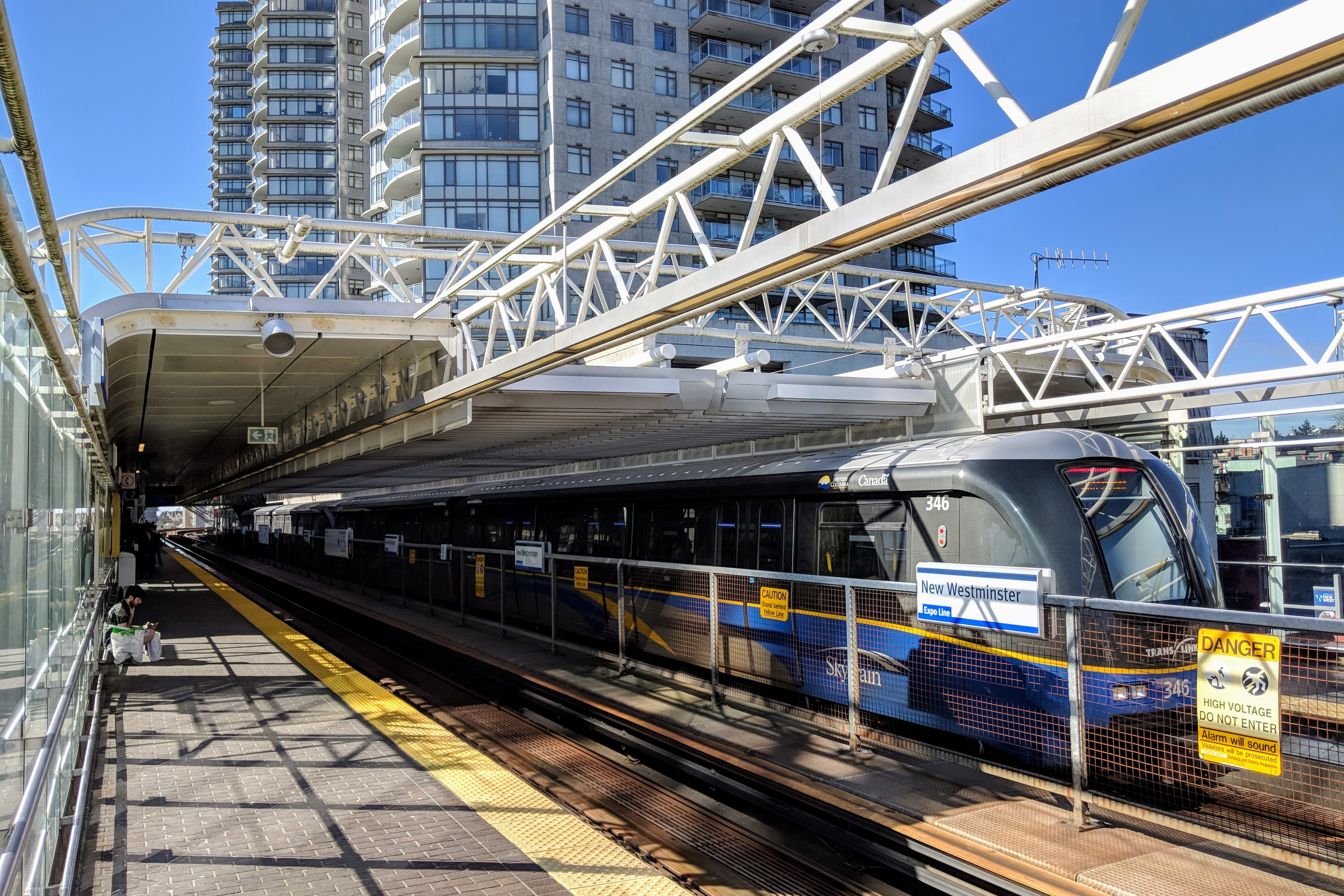
- Platform level at New Westminster station

General information
- Location: 32 8th Street, New Westminster
- Coordinates: 49.201354°N 122.912716°W
- System: SkyTrain station
- Owner: TransLink
- Platforms: Side platforms
- Tracks: 2

Construction
- Structure type: Elevated
- Accessible: yes
- Architect: Architektengruppe U-Bahn

Other information
- Station code: NW
- Fare zone: 2

History
- Opened: December 11, 1985; 40 years ago
- Rebuilt: 2012, 2015–2016; 10 years ago

Passengers
- 2025: 4,584,000 ▲0.5%
- Rank: 11 of 54

Services
Preceding station	TransLink	Following station
22nd Street towards Waterfront	Expo Line	Columbia towards King George or Production Way–University
Location

New Westminster is an elevated station on the Expo Line of Metro Vancouver's SkyTrain rapid transit system. The station is located at the intersection of Columbia Street and 8th Street in New Westminster, British Columbia. In 2012, the station was incorporated into the Shops at New West complex, making it the first train station in Canada to have a direct connection to a shopping centre at the platform level.

== History ==
New Westminster station was built in 1985 as part of the original SkyTrain system (now known as the Expo Line), providing a transportation link to Expo 86 being held in the city of Vancouver. The Austrian architecture firm Architektengruppe U-Bahn was responsible for designing the station. The station also served as part of a strategy for redeveloping the districts along the New Westminster Quay.

Upon opening, New Westminster station was the original eastern terminus of the SkyTrain system, and remained so until the completion of Columbia station in 1989. The station still serves as a temporary terminus for the Expo Line towards closing hours of revenue service. During the station's period as terminus station, a temporary platform had been built over the westbound guideway with trains thus arriving and departing on the eastbound track.

At its inception, New Westminster served as the major transfer point for buses servicing Coquitlam, Langley, Port Coquitlam, Port Moody and Surrey. After the Expo Line extension in 1990, Langley and Surrey buses were rerouted to terminate at Scott Road station. Coquitlam, Port Coquitlam and Port Moody buses were eventually rerouted after the completion of Millennium Line in 2002; these routes now terminate at either Braid, Lougheed Town Centre, or Burquitlam stations.

In 2012, the Shops at New West shopping centre was integrated into the station. The shopping centre was a major component of the mixed-use development of Plaza 88.

Between May 2015 and November 2016, the station received $12 million in upgrades which included better integration with the Shops at New West complex that was built as part of Plaza 88 project. Broader plans to upgrade the station and Expo Line were put forth by TransLink and the British Columbia Rapid Transit Company (BCRTC).

== Services ==
- The station connects to local bus and shuttle services to Quayside and Uptown areas, as well as regional bus connections to Burnaby.
- Select late-night Expo Line trips from Production Way–University and King George terminate at this station.
- The station houses the "New Westminster Smoke Shoppe", a small convenience store that opened with the opening of SkyTrain's formal revenue service in 1986.
- New Westminster Quay and River Market are two blocks south of the station, across railway tracks. Pedestrians can access the Quay via a pedestrian overpass or via a ground-level crossing.
- A pedestrian overpass across the SkyTrain tracks connects the upper levels of the station.
- The Shops at New West, along with a 10-screen Landmark Cinemas theatre, are directly accessible from the station.

== Station information ==
=== Entrances ===
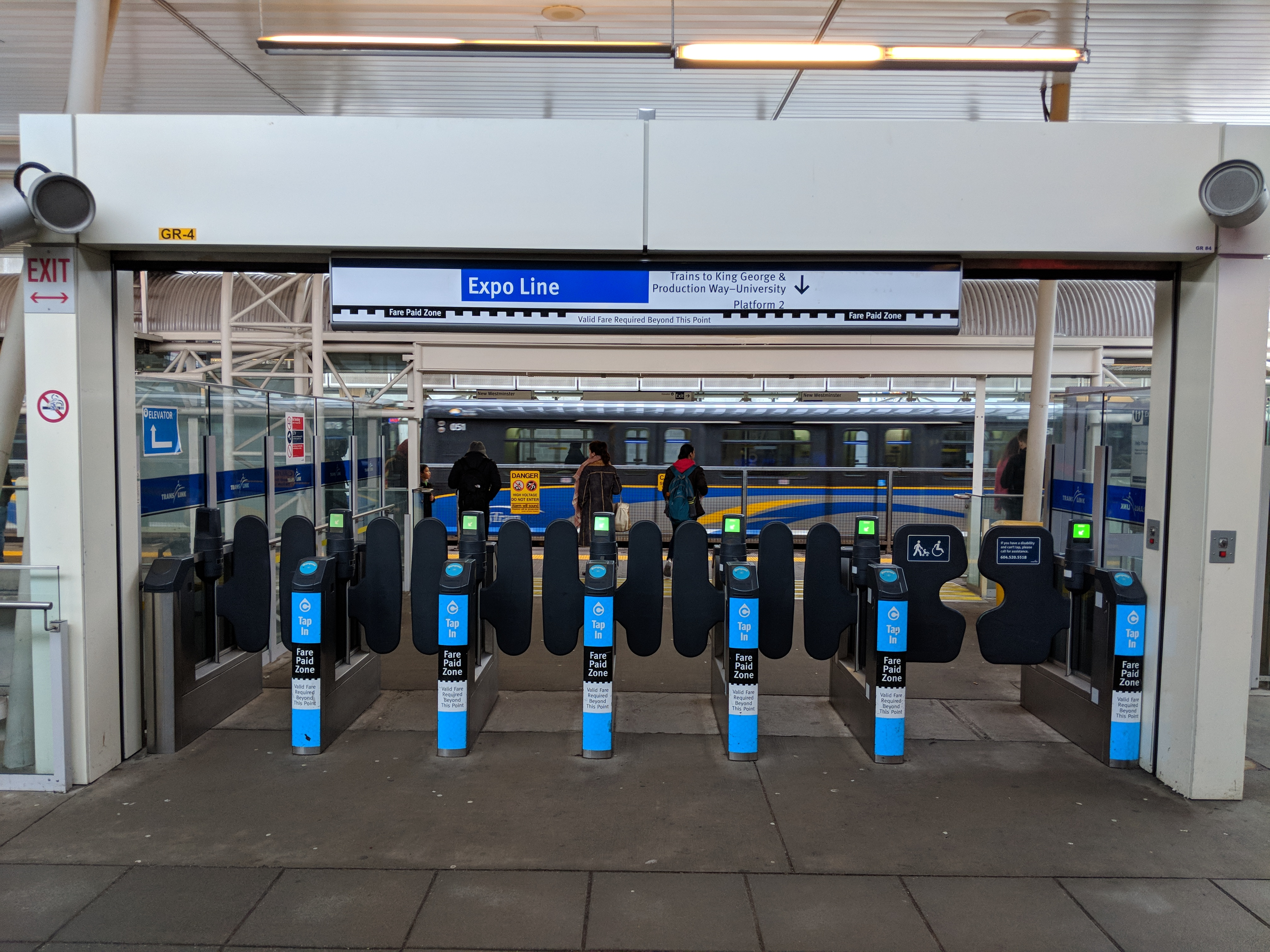
Platform level entrance with service to King George and Production Way–University

- 8th Street entrance: This is the east entrance of the station, located on 8th Street between Columbia Street and Carnarvon Street. Of the three entrances to the station, the 8th Street entrance has the higher pedestrian activity. Bicycle racks are available at this entrance. Temporary connections to the New Westminster community shuttles are provided at Bay 6 and 7 near this entrance.
- McNeely Street entrance: This entrance served the original off-street bus loop and serves the current temporary on-street temporary transit exchange for conventional buses (bays 1 to 5) on Carnarvon Street. It is located at the west end of the station and is connected to the other two entrances at the concourse level.
- Quayside Drive entrance: This entrance was opened in December 2011 as part of the Plaza 88 development. It offers a connection between the concourse level of the station and the Quayside overpass through the Shops at New West.

=== Transit connections ===
The bus loop at New Westminster station is located under the Shops at New West between Carnarvon Street and Columbia Street, west of 8th Street. Bus bay assignments of the exchange are as follows:

Bay	Location	Routes
1	8th Street; Southbound	Unloading only
2	Columbia Street; Westbound	103 Quayside
3	Columbia Street; Westbound	Unloading only
4	Bus loop	123 Brentwood Station; 321 White Rock Centre (limited service); N19 Downtown NightBus; N19 Surrey Central Station NightBus
5	Bus loop	105 Uptown; 109 Lougheed Station
6	Bus loop	HandyDART service
7	Bus loop	106 Edmonds Station
8	Carnarvon Street; Eastbound	Unloading only
9	8th Street; Southbound	102 Victoria Hill
10	Carnarvon Street; Eastbound	112 Edmonds Station
