= Braid station =

Metro Vancouver SkyTrain station

Braid
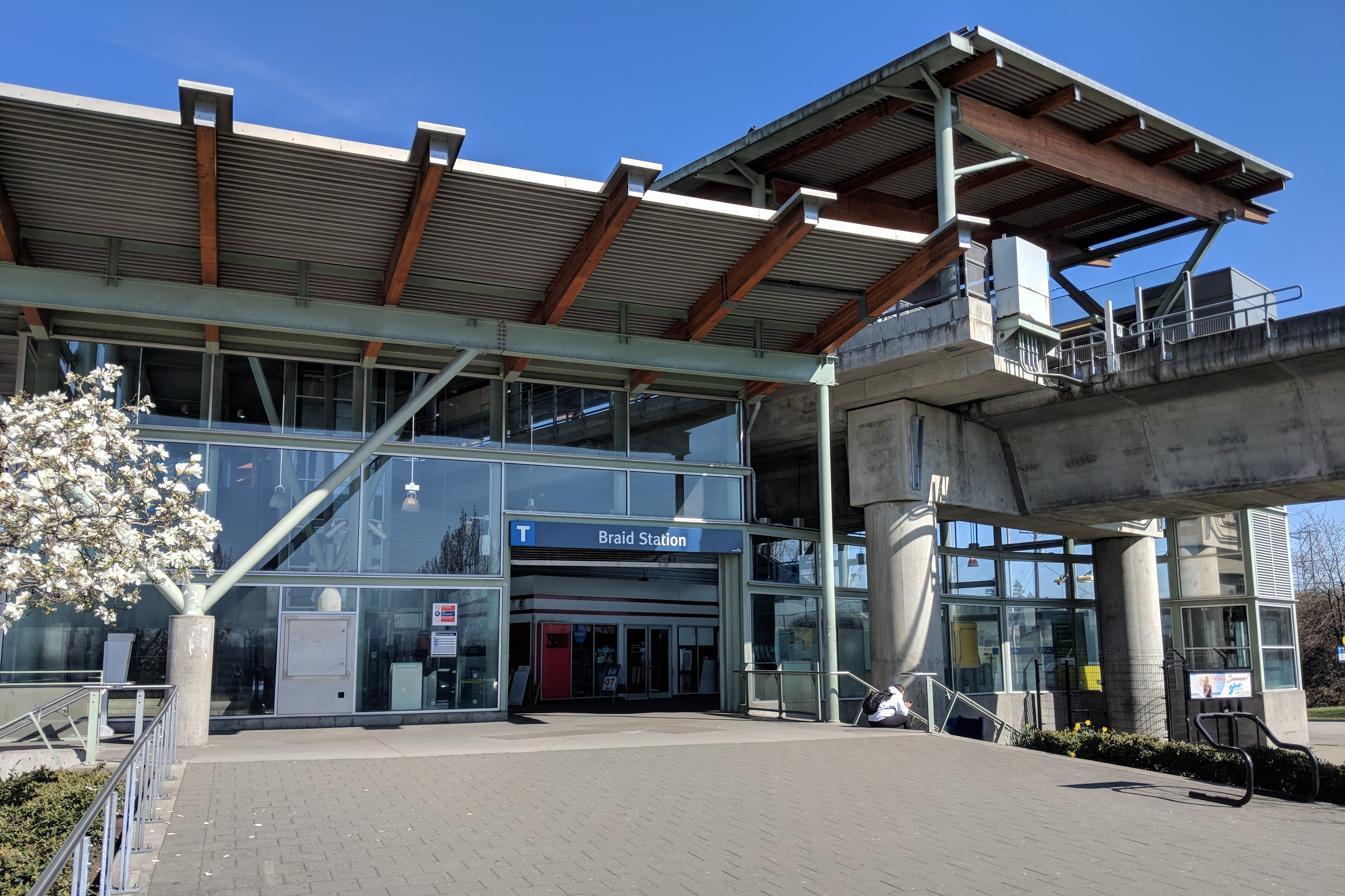
- Braid station is served by a single entrance

General information
- Location: 81 Braid Street, New Westminster
- Coordinates: 49.23322°N 122.88283°W
- System: SkyTrain station
- Owner: TransLink
- Platforms: Side platforms
- Tracks: 2

Construction
- Structure type: Elevated
- Accessible: yes
- Architect: Francl Architecture; Stantec Architecture

Other information
- Station code: BD
- Fare zone: 2

History
- Opened: January 2, 2002

Passengers
- 2025: 1,364,000 ▼7.1%
- Rank: 37 of 54

Services
Preceding station	TransLink	Following station
Sapperton towards Waterfront via Columbia	Expo Line Lougheed branch	Lougheed Town Centre towards Production Way–University
Location

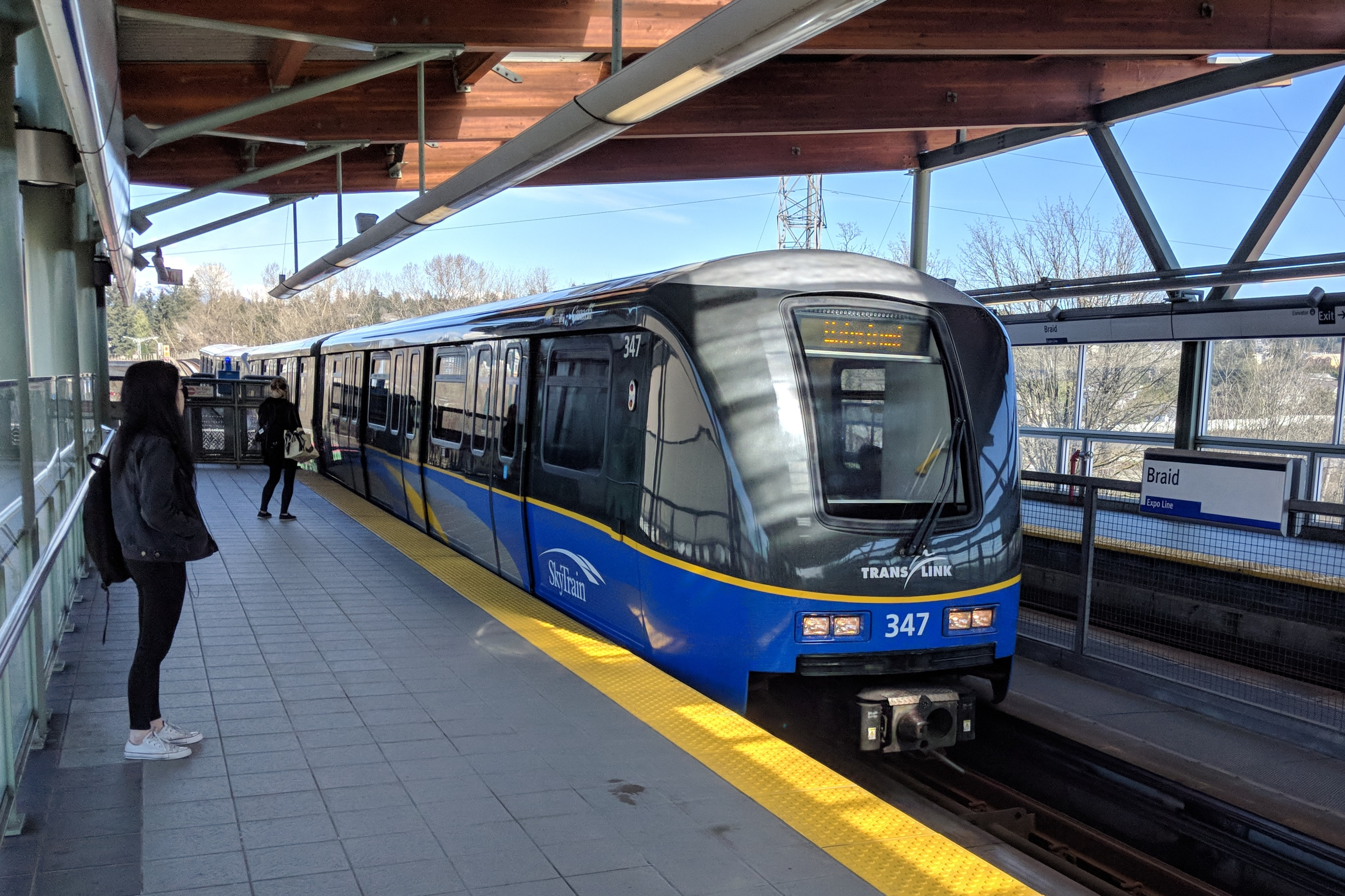
Platform level at Braid

Braid is an elevated station on the Expo Line of Metro Vancouver's SkyTrain rapid transit system. The station is located near the intersect of Braid Street and Brunette Avenue in the Brunette Creek neighbourhood of New Westminster, British Columbia, Canada. Positioned near the Coquitlam border, the station is a major transfer point for bus routes serving the Tri-City area.

== History ==
The station was built in 2002 as part of the original Millennium Line project. Before the first phase of the line was completed, a short spur from Columbia station was opened in eastern New Westminster, as a test track; Braid station was the temporary terminus of this spur until the line to Commercial–Broadway station was completed.

In 2016, SkyTrain service was reconfigured in anticipation of the opening of the Evergreen Extension; as a result, the Millennium Line service was discontinued at Braid station. Since October 22, 2016, Braid has been served by an Expo Line branch with service between Waterfront and Production Way–University stations.

== Structure and design ==
Braid, like all stations constructed as part of the original Millennium Line route, has a unique design. Artwork at the station features wooden timbers inside the platform level, and pavers with inspirational words that imply positive things installed into the station lobby floor. The architecture firms Francl Architecture and Stantec Architecture were responsible for designing the station.

== Station information ==
=== Entrances ===
Braid is served by a single entrance located at the south end of the station. Vehicular access to the entrance is available via an access road connected to Rousseau Street.

=== Transit connections ===
This station is a major transfer point for TransLink bus routes serving the northeast sector of the Metro Vancouver; these buses serve Coquitlam, Port Coquitlam and New Westminster. There is a convenience store located at the ground level. The SkyTrain station is located geographically within fare zone 2. However, as of October 5, 2015, no additional fare is required in switching from bus to SkyTrain and vice versa.

Bus bay assignments:

Bay	Route number	Destination
1	169	Coquitlam Central Station
2	159	Coquitlam Central Station
3	791	Haney Place (Note: Express in Coquitlam and Port Coquitlam) (Note: Weekdays only) (Note: No evening service)
4	153	Coquitlam Central Station
5	156	Lougheed Station
6	128	22nd Street Station
6	155	22nd Street Station
