= Shops at New West =

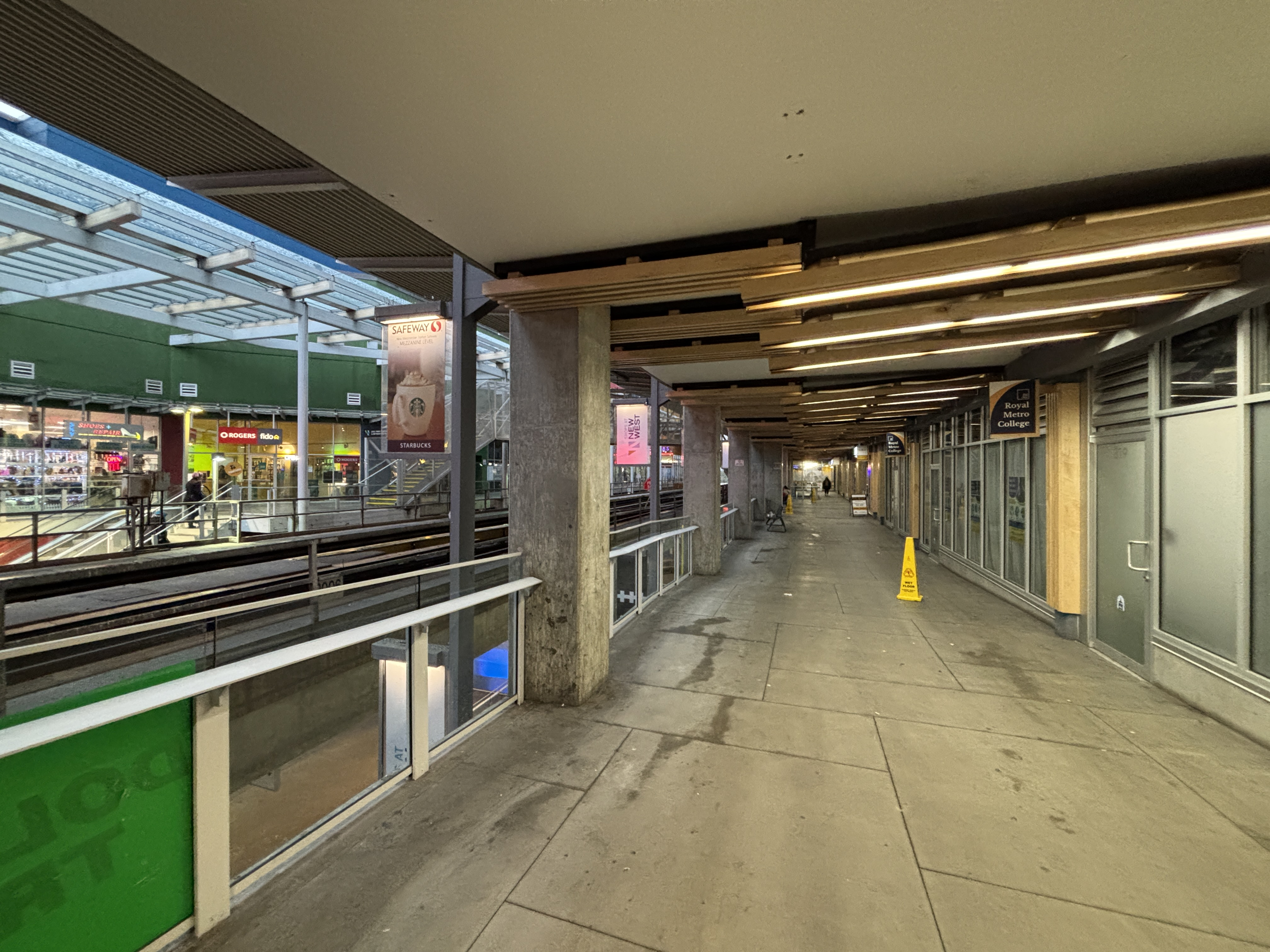
- Shops at New West in 2024
- Location: New Westminster, British Columbia, Canada
- Coordinates: 49.201354°N 122.912716°W
- Address: 800 Carnarvon Street
- Opened: November 17, 2012; 13 years ago
- Developer: First Capital Realty
- Manager: First Capital Realty
- Owner: First Capital Realty
- Num. of stores: 35
- Num. of anchor tenants: 3 (Landmark Cinemas, Safeway, Shoppers Drug Mart)
- Floor area: 20,578 square metres (221,500 sq ft)
- Floors: 3
- Public transit: New Westminster
- Website: shopsatnewwest.com

Shops at New West is a shopping centre in New Westminster, British Columbia, Canada. The complex is unique for its integration into New Westminster station, a SkyTrain station on Metro Vancouver's metropolitan rail system. The shopping centre opened on November 17, 2012 and is owned by First Capital Realty.
