= British Columbia Penitentiary =

Prison in British Columbia, Canada (1878–1980)

- Interactive map of British Columbia Penitentiary
- Location: New Westminster, British Columbia, Canada; 49.2182°N 122.8946°W
- Security class: Maximum security
- Population: 765
- Opened: September 28, 1878
- Closed: May 10, 1980
- Managed by: Correctional Service of Canada

The British Columbia Penitentiary (BC Penitentiary, commonly referred to as the BC Pen and the Pen) was a federal maximum security prison located in New Westminster, British Columbia, Canada. The BC Penitentiary operated for 102 years, from 1878 until it was decommissioned in 1980. It was the first federal penal institution west of Manitoba.

== History ==
After British Columbia joined the Canadian Confederation in 1871 and with the population of western Canada increasing, the need for a federal prison in western Canada became apparent. The fact that the transcontinental railroad had not yet been constructed made transporting prisoners long distances east to other federal institutions costly and difficult, which further exacerbated this need.

Planning and construction for the BC Penitentiary began in 1874. The site selected was a hillside overlooking the Fraser River in the Sapperton neighbourhood of New Westminster. The prison received its first inmates in 1878 and opened without fanfare.

The buildings and structures that made up the BC Penitentiary site were added gradually. The original complex comprised the main gate house and a few brick and wooden buildings. The large cell blocks, which housed most of the inmates, were constructed between 1904 and 1914.

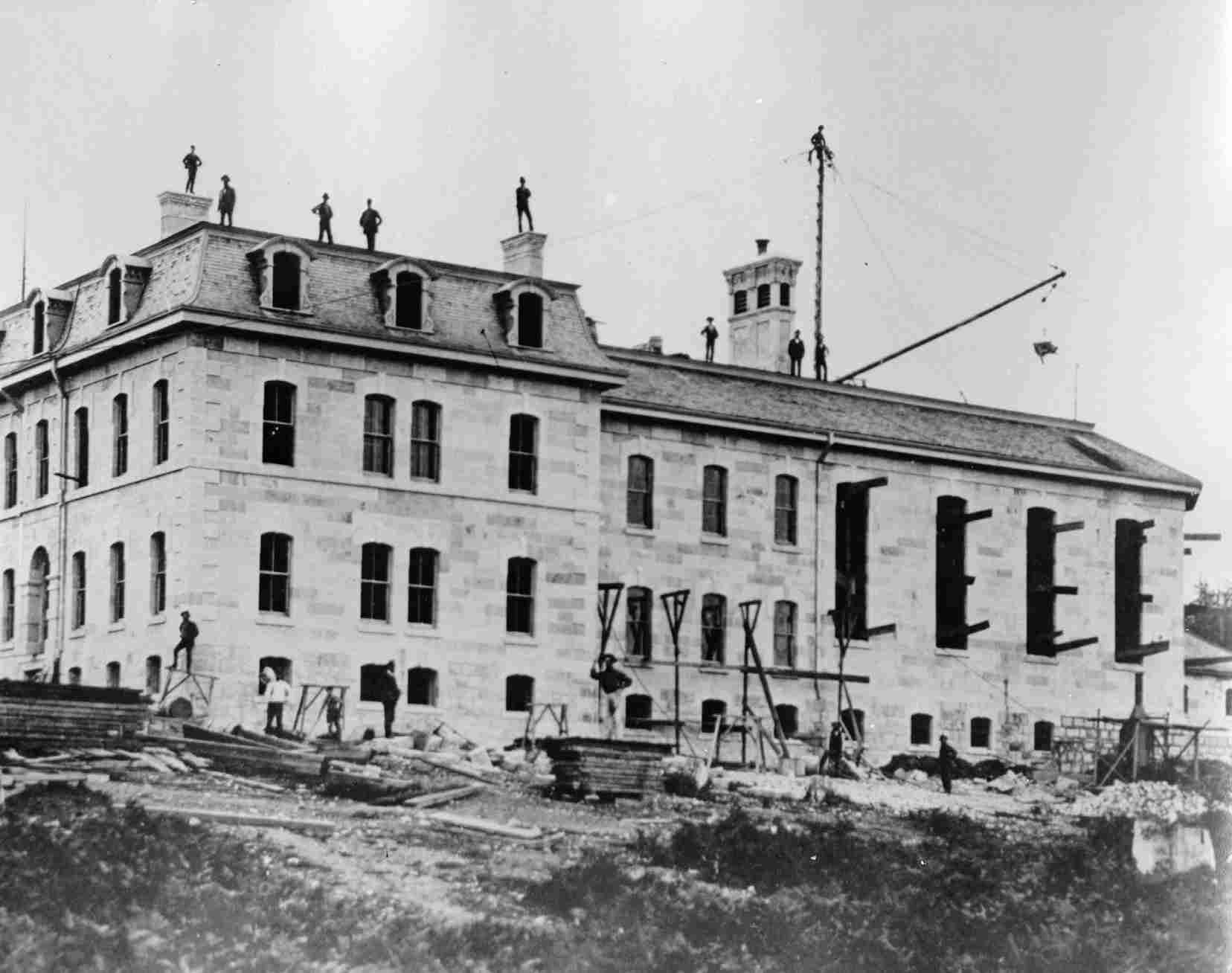
BC Penitentiary under construction in 1877

BC Penitentiary was replete with structural problems when it opened, including flooding of the basement, faulty plumbing and heating, bars either missing from windows or not properly affixed to the walls, and the lack of proper medical facilities. Major repairs and renovations were conducted over several years to remedy these issues, with most of the work performed by inmate work crews.

The site was initially fenced by a wooden fence, which was soon upgraded to 30-foot rock walls, and finally 40-foot concrete walls. Guard towers were located on each corner.

Until 1961, the prison incorporated a farm, located across the street from the penitentiary, where some inmates would be assigned to work. The farm produced a sizeable portion of the food used use in the institution's kitchen. The farm was economically viable into the late 1950s. However, increasing costs of its operation, decreasing costs of buying food from outside sources, the perceived decline in the usefulness of providing agricultural training to inmates, and the increasing urbanization of the surrounding area, led to the decision to close the farm and sell the farmland to the City of New Westminster.

Staffing requirements increased over time in accordance with standards dictated by the Canadian Penitentiary Service. They were 171 in the mid-1950s, and had increased to 363 in 1976, despite a decrease in the prison population during this period.

BC Penitentiary experienced severe overcrowding starting in the 1950s holding as many as 765 prisoners in 1958. The Canadian Penitentiary Service attempted to alleviate this by transferring inmates to other institutions, such as the recently opened William Head Institution. By the mid-1960s, the population had been reduced to around 500 inmates. However, this did not prevent the series of violent riots and hostage-takings that plagued BC Penitentiary in its final years.

On March 12, 1979, Correctional Service of Canada announced that British Columbia Penitentiary would close. Inmates were gradually transferred to Kent Institution, with the last inmate leaving on February 15, 1980. For two weeks in May, 1980, the prison was opened to the public for the first time; over 80,000 attended the open house. Although BC Penitentiary had opened with no ceremony or fanfare whatever 102 years earlier, a formal ceremony, attended by various dignitaries, was held to mark its closing on May 10, 1980.

Most of the buildings on the former BC Pen site have been demolished and replaced by residential housing and parkland. Only four parts of the original prison still remain: the Gatehouse (which is now a sports bar), the Coal House, the original Centre Block (which has been converted to offices), and the cemetery.

== Daily routine ==
In its latter years of operation, the daily routine for inmates in the general population was as follows: rise at 7:00 am; clean cell, shave and wash-up; get breakfast from the kitchen and eat it in the cell; report for work at 8:00 am; leave work at 11:30 am; pick-up lunch and return to cell for count and lock-up; eat lunch in the cell; work from 1:00 pm until 3:30 pm; collect dinner from kitchen; return to cell for count and lock-up; eat dinner in cell; leisure period from 6:00 pm until 9:00 pm in winter/10:00 pm in summer; must be back in cell block at 11:00 pm.

== Facilities ==
BC Penitentiary contained the standard features of a maximum security prison of its era. These included, among other things, cell blocks, offices, a hospital, a kitchen, work and school facilities, and two chapels (one Catholic, one Protestant). One peculiarity was that there was no dining hall; the inmates thus had to eat their meals in their cells.

== Cemetery ==
The BC Penitentiary site included a prison cemetery called Boot Hill. The remains of most inmates who died at BC Penitentiary were claimed by their families; those that were not were buried at Boot Hill. All work relating to the cemetery such as digging graves, site maintenance, and the construction of grave markers and coffins, was performed by inmates. The cemetery officially opened in 1913, but was probably in use in 1912.

The remains of approximately 50 inmates are still buried there. During the cemetery's early years, records were not carefully taken or preserved, and are unreliable. Most graves are marked by small concrete gravestones engraved only with the inmate's prison number. Some inmates are buried in unmarked graves.

Although most of the prison has since been demolished, the cemetery still remains (49.21687°N 122.89897°W) in what is now Glenbrook Ravine Park. After BC Penitentiary closed, the federal government ceded the cemetery to the City of New Westminster. Very few people know that the cemetery is there, it is maintained by the City of New Westminster and has an information plaque with prisoner grave information. The cemetery is mentioned in the history section of Glenbrook Ravine Park.

== The Doukhobors ==
BC Penitentiary was heavily involved in government conflict with the Sons of Freedom sect of British Columbia Doukhobors in the mid 20th century. Throughout this period, the Sons of Freedom protested against perceived government interference or injustice through acts of public nudity and arson; as a result they were frequently subject to mass arrests, which resulted in mass convictions.

In 1931, over 600 BC Doukhobors were sentenced to three-year prison terms for public nudity. BC Penitentiary was unable to handle such a spike in the inmate population, so a satellite prison under the authority of the BC Penitentiary was constructed on Piers Island specifically to house these prisoners. When the majority of these sentences expired, the prison camp was closed and the remaining Doukhobor inmates were transferred to the main penitentiary.

In 1950, there was another mass-conviction of Doukhobors relating to arsons. In response, BC Penitentiary set up a self-contained compound for these prisoners adjacent to the main penitentiary. Whereas the experience on Peirce Island was mostly peaceful, this time things were different. The prisoners set the compound on fire twice in 1951, the latter time mostly destroying it. The Doukhobor prisoners were then moved to the main prison, where they participated in a 35-day hunger strike that ended with forced-feedings.

Another mass conviction occurred in 1953 relating to another arson and public nudity incident. New huts were constructed at BC Penitentiary, but this time they were used to house members of the general prison population in order to free up space to move the Doukhobors into fire-proofed cells in the main cellblocks.

Another round of arsons in 1961 and 1962 prompted the creation of the Agassiz Mountain Prison as a satellite of BC Penitentiary. This prison was specifically designed to house Doukhobor prisoners. Since the Doukhobors refused to do any work while incarcerated, there were no work programs and no privileges for the inmates at the new institution. The entire prison was designed to avoid incendiarism, with everything, including furniture, being made of concrete or metal. All fabrics, such as clothing and bedding, were fireproofed. The leaders of the Sons of Freedom were kept segregated, as were the younger men. The inmates began a hunger strike in August 1962, which carried on for over a year and resulted in one death due to malnutrition, despite forced-feedings.

The last Doukhobor prisoner was released in 1970. Agassiz Mountain Prison was turned into a prison for elderly inmates from BC penitentiary, and eventually split off as a separate medium security institution.

== Discipline and punishment ==
Methods of punishment for violations of prison rules employed within BC Penitentiary evolved along with the times. Corporal punishment was initially the preferred method for a number of infractions, with flogging being the most common. Corporal punishment was gradually phased out until it was banned outright in 1972. Other common form of punishment included working on the chain gang, punitive diets of bread and water, and solitary confinement.

In BC Penitentiary's more modern incarnation, punishments tended to be much more bureaucratically managed. The most common forms of punishment were loss of privileges, and solitary confinement.

=== Solitary confinement ===
Solitary confinement (officially called "dissociation"; commonly referred to as "segregation") was a common form of punishment at BC Penitentiary. Prisoners could be placed in segregation for three reasons: at their own request; as punishment for up to 30 days; or for administrative purposes for an unlimited amount of time. In practice, administrative segregation was often used to punish prisoners; controls on the use of administrative segregation were extremely discretionary and thus open to misuse. It was common for prisoners to be kept in solitary confinement for months or even years at a time. For example, an inmate named Jack McCann spent 1421 days – 754 of those consecutive – in solitary confinement between 1970 and 1974.

Formally known as the Special Correction Unit (SCU), the solitary confinement cells were commonly called "the Penthouse" by inmates and staff, partly due to their location on the top floor of one of the cell blocks. (The Penthouse had been built in 1963 to replace the old solitary confinement cells that were in the basement, which were known as "the Hole".) BC Penitentiary's solitary confinement cells were known as being particularly brutal for a modern prison.

The cells were extremely small, with three concrete walls with no windows, and a solid steel door with a five-inch square window facing the corridor. The cells contained only a wash basin/toilet combination (cold water only), and a radio selector (there were two channels), and a concrete pad covered with a sheet of plywood four inches off the floor on which the inmates slept. Inmates could not control the volume of the radio nor the temperature of the cell. The lights in the cell remained on 24 hours a day, but were dimmed to 25 watts at night.

Inmates who were in the SCU for disciplinary or administrative reasons would be confined to their cells for 23.5 hours per day. They would be given half an hour of exercise, which consisted of walking alone in the corridor between cells in the SCU. A rubber pad and blanket would be delivered in the evening and collected each morning. The inmates would not have any opportunity to see the outdoors. Inmates who were in the SCU for protective custody would be allowed to retain the rubber pad and blanket throughout the day, and would sometimes be permitted to exercise outdoors for half an hour per day. Inmates were not permitted to speak to one another, work, attend school, visit the library, watch TV, or engage in any other interactive activities.

In addition to the harsh conditions, harassment and abuse by the guards in the SCU was widespread and endemic.

=== Executions ===
Only one execution was ever carried out at BC Penitentiary. Before the abolition of the death penalty in Canada, executions were carried out at provincial gaols rather than federal prisons. An exception was made in the case of Joseph Smith, aged 24, who was executed by hanging on January 31, 1913.

Smith and another inmate at BC Penitentiary, Herman Wilson, killed a guard during an escape attempt on October 5, 1912. Wilson was injured during the attempt and died from his injuries before his trial; Smith was tried and convicted of murder.

The official reasoning for conducting the execution at BC Penitentiary was that it was easier to continue to house Smith there rather than transfer him to a provincial institution. However, it is likely that this was intended to serve as an example to the other inmates at BC Penitentiary. A scaffold was specially constructed for the execution, near the spot where the guard had been killed during the failed escape attempt. Smith was interred in the prison cemetery.

== Riots and hostage-takings ==
Like most maximum security prisons of its vintage, BC Penitentiary experienced a number of inmate suicides, self-mutilations, assaults, stabbings, escape attempts and murders throughout its history. In its later years, BC Penitentiary became known for its riots and hostage-takings.

BC Penitentiary had few major violent incidents in its early history. It did not experience its first riot until 1934, its 56th year of operation. However, it began to experience exponentially more of these major incidents as the facility aged and became less suitable as a modern prison. Most of BC Penitentiary's major violent incidents occurred in its final 10 years of operation in the 1970s. During the 1970s, BC Penitentiary was one of the most violent federal institutions in Canada. The worsening of conditions and increasing number of violent incidents at BC Pen contributed to its decommissioning in 1980.

=== 1934 riot ===
Rioting began on September 1, 1934, when seven prisoners refused to do their assigned work. By September 10, 73 prisoners were striking. Furniture and toilets were smashed, as well as 182 windows. The riot ended on September 12 when its leaders were paddled. The inmates were protesting generally poor conditions, and were also demanding that they be paid for the work that they did. The riot was instrumental to the Canadian government implementing a policy of paying its federal inmates five cents per day.

=== 1963 riot and hostage-taking ===
On April 20, 1963, a guard found three prisoners attempting to escape. The guard fired at the prisoners and they responded by throwing Molotov cocktails. The three inmates, led by inmate Gerry Casey, took guard Pat Dennis hostage and, along with 15 other inmates, locked themselves in the auditorium. Other prisoners then began starting fires and destroying the prison.

The inmates insisted on negotiating through local broadcaster Jack Webster. "The mad ringleader, Gerry Casey, his lean face suffused with anger, struck the knife against Dennis' throat and screamed at me," Webster wrote in a story for the Vancouver Sun. "Tell Warden Tom Hall if the bulls break in here, the guard dies first. You'll die too Webster! We all die. Get on that telephone!"

Royal Canadian Mounted Police and the Canadian Army restored order to the prison, except for the auditorium. The hostage-takers' only demand was that they be transferred out of BC Pen; the incident ended after this demand was acceded to.

=== 1973 riot ===
A three-day riot started on October 5, 1973. Twenty-three cells were destroyed.

=== 1975 hostage-takings ===
In February 1975, a staff member was held hostage for four hours.

On June 9, 1975, at approximately 8:00 am, 15 prison staff were taken hostage by three inmates. The incident lasted until June 11 at 1:00 am, a total of 41 hours, when an armed tactical squad of prison officers stormed the prison. One of the inmates, convicted murderer Andy Bruce, grabbed a hostage, classification officer Mary Steinhauser, to use as a human shield. The 32-year-old Steinhauser was killed by friendly fire, while Bruce was shot twice, but survived. A Commission of Inquiry was appointed to determine the causes of the incident. Its findings included:

- Prior to the riot, each of the three hostage-takers had spent considerable time in solitary confinement, which was known for being "inhumane;" and that the inmates were released directly from the SCU into the general population without adequate supervision
- Deplorable conditions at BC Pen contributed to high staff turnover; in 1974, the rate of turnover for correctional officers was 61.2%. There was also a major backlog in training for correctional officers. Many staff who were on duty when the riot started were not adequately experienced nor trained
- The facilities were ancient and not suitable as a modern prison, which contributed to an environment with a high potential for further incidents
- Serious overcrowding
- Lack of cooperation and communication between staff
- Poor control of knives in the kitchen
- Lack of an alarm system in certain buildings

On July 4, a prison staff member was held hostage by one prisoner for eight hours.

=== 1976 riot and hostage-takings ===
In February, three prisoners took three guards hostage for almost 15 hours.

In April, four prisoners took three guards hostage for 13 hours. Two prisoners were also found dead that month.

In June, prisoners attempted to take two guards hostage; they escaped with minor injuries.

On August 31, one prisoner briefly took a guard hostage.

Starting September 9, there was a 12-day state of emergency when guards refused to work overtime. Three inmates died during this period.

The largest major incident in BC Penitentiary's history started on September 27, 1976. A large percentage of the inmate population started rioting as they were released from their cells for showers. Over the next few days, the inmates destroyed most of the cellblocks and several other parts of the prison. They destroyed the internal walls between cell blocks – which had stood for nearly a century – in many cases with their hands. The principal complaints were abuse by the guards, and the refusal by the guards to follow new, more humane directives. Two guards were taken hostage. Police riot control squads, and Canadian Army soldiers surrounded the perimeter of the prison. After the newly formed Citizens' Advisory Committee arrived on site and began participating in negotiations, the hostage-takers released one hostage in a show of good faith, and a nine-point deal was eventually struck on October 2, peacefully ending the riot and hostage-taking.
