= Brunette River =

River in British Columbia, Canada

Coordinates: 49.230350°N 122.875271°W

The Brunette River runs through East Burnaby, New Westminster and Coquitlam, flowing out of Burnaby Lake and to the Fraser River. It is the final outflow of the Central Valley Watershed, which consists of most streams between the Ulksen and Burnaby Heights. According to a map and materials by Heritage Advisory Committee and Environment and Waste Management Committee of the City of Burnaby (1993), the number of native campsites discovered on the shores of the Fraser River, Burrard Inlet and Deer Lake and some petroglyphs suggest that the area was used extensively by local aboriginal peoples such as the Squamish, Musqueam and Kwantlen for hunting and fishing before the arrival of European settlers.

The earliest known European immigrant who settled on the banks of the Brunette River near the present-day North Road in 1860 was William Holmes. According to his daughter Charlotte, local native people gathered at their farm each season to catch and dry their winter supplies of salmon. She remembers that the salmon runs were so huge on the Brunette River that the fish actually crowded each other out of the water and if they had remained stationary "you could have walked across the stream without getting your shoes wet." The river was named by Holmes for its peaty brown colour.

== See also ==
- List of rivers of British Columbia
- List of tributaries of the Fraser River
