= Columbia station (SkyTrain) =

Metro Vancouver SkyTrain station

Columbia
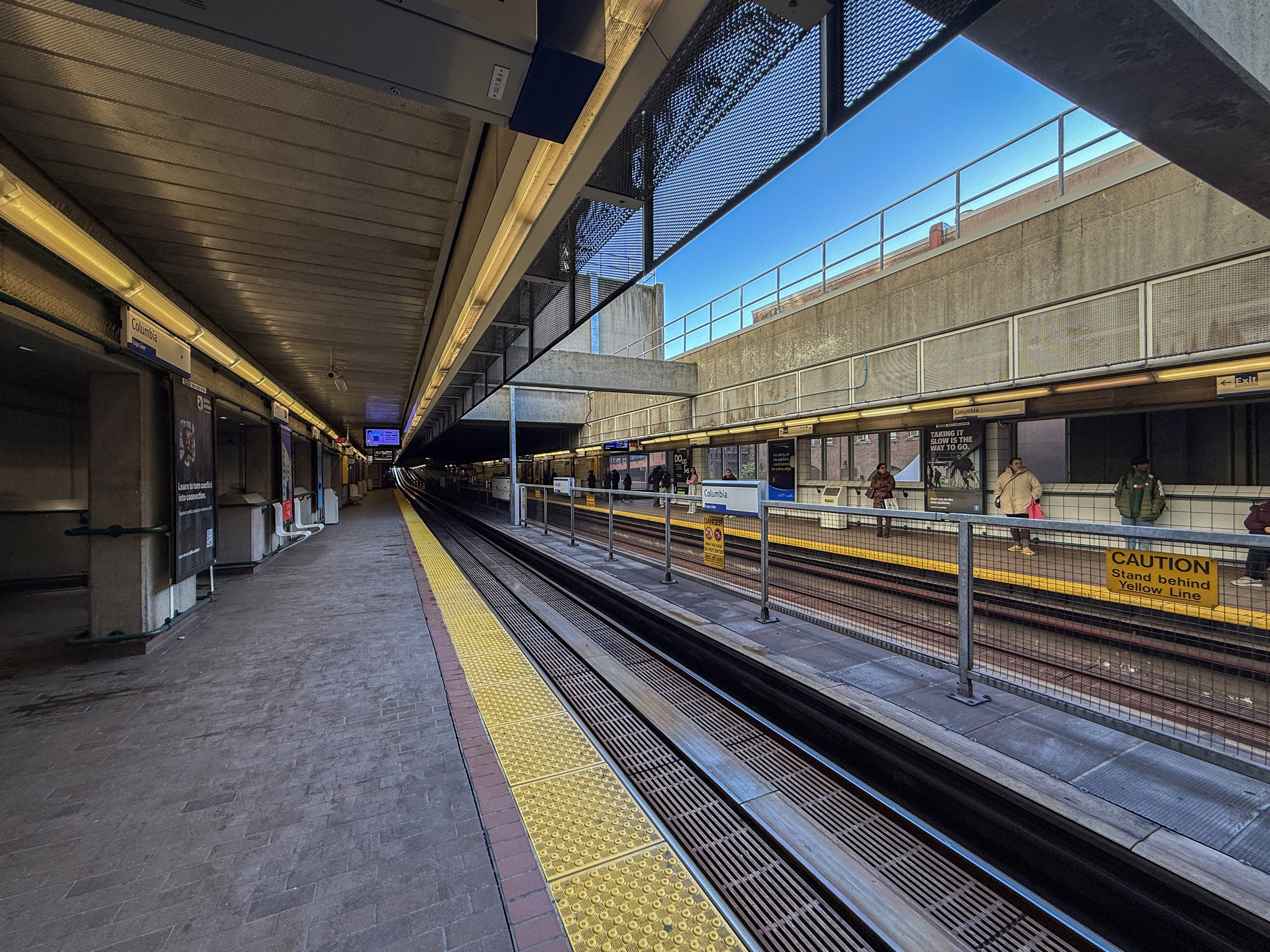
- Platform level at Columbia station

General information
- Location: 435 Columbia Street, New Westminster
- Coordinates: 49.20476°N 122.906161°W
- System: SkyTrain station
- Owner: TransLink
- Platforms: Side platforms
- Tracks: 2

Construction
- Structure type: Underground
- Accessible: yes

Other information
- Station code: CO
- Fare zone: 2

History
- Opened: February 14, 1989; 37 years ago
- Former names: 4th Street (planning)

Passengers
- 2025: 1,392,000 ▼3%
- Rank: 35 of 54

Services
Preceding station	TransLink	Following station
New Westminster towards Waterfront	Expo Line Surrey branch	Scott Road towards King George
New Westminster towards Waterfront	Expo Line Lougheed branch	Sapperton towards Production Way–University
Location

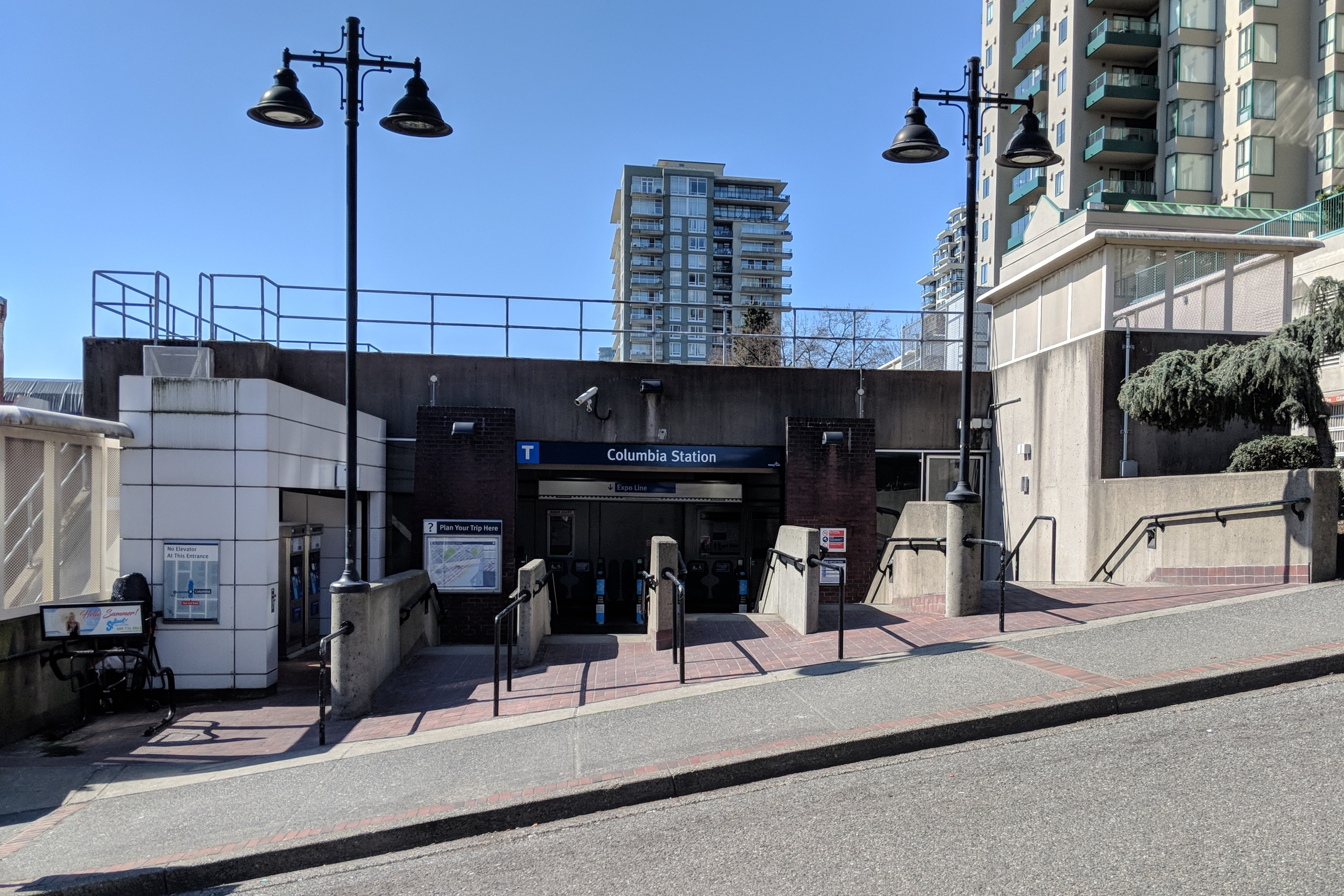
4th Street entrance

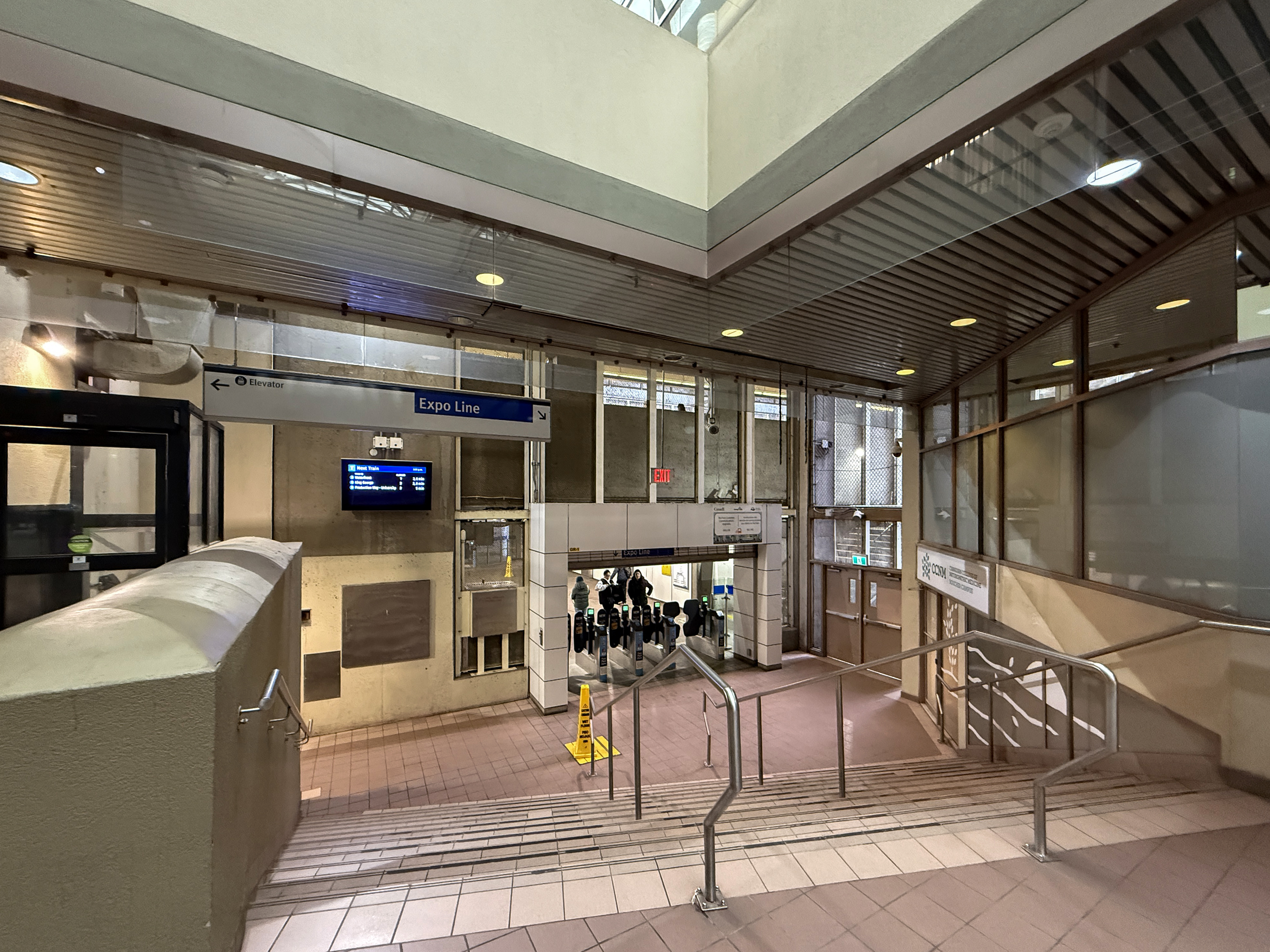
Columbia Street entrance in the Boucher Centre mall

Columbia is an underground station on the Expo Line of Metro Vancouver's SkyTrain rapid transit system. The station is located on Columbia Street in New Westminster, British Columbia, and is a major transfer point between the two branches of the Expo Line, which separate from the main line at the flying junction just east of the station, with one terminating at King George station in Surrey and the other at Production Way–University station in Burnaby.

== History ==
Columbia station was built between 1988 and 1989, and served as the system's temporary terminus (replacing New Westminster station) until it was extended to Scott Road station the following year, following the completion of the SkyBridge. During planning and construction, it was known as "4th Street", but was ultimately named after Columbia Street.

In 2002, the station became a major transfer point between two SkyTrain lines as the Millennium Line was interlined with the portion of the Expo Line that ran between Waterfront station and this station. At the same time, the transfer point for regional buses from Coquitlam, Port Coquitlam, and Port Moody was moved north to Braid and Lougheed Town Centre stations. In 2016, the original Millennium Line service than ran between Waterfront and VCC–Clark via Columbia was replaced by an Expo Line branch with service between Waterfront and Production Way–University. In February 2020, TransLink announced preliminary plans to overhaul Columbia station to improve accessibility and passenger flow.

== Structure and design ==
Columbia station was built horizontally on a slope, so that the inbound platform in the north is underground, while the outbound platform in the south is predominantly at grade. The track at both ends of the station dips underground below Clarkson Street.

During construction, the station was not planned to be a major transfer point and was built with side platforms, which prevents cross-platform transfers. There is also only one escalator at the station, which leads up to the inbound platform. A second up escalator to the outbound platform is proposed as part of Expo Line upgrades.

== Station information ==
=== Entrances ===
- 4th Street entrance: located at the east side of the station. Unlike the other two entrances, the entrance from 4th Street is located above the platform level. There is no elevator or escalator at this entrance.
- Clarkson Street entrance: connects Clarkson Street with the station through a series of stairs. The entrance is located at the north end of the lower street level, at the opposite end from the Columbia Street entrance.
- Columbia Street entrance: connects the west side of the station with Columbia Street, half a level above, through a small shopping mall. An elevator is provided by the mall for station access. However, since this elevator is not a property of TransLink, the reliability of this accessible entrance is not guaranteed and it had been reported that the elevator can be out of service for an extended amount of time. An up escalator is provided between the lower street level and the inbound platform only. Passengers accessing the outbound platform must climb up a full flight of 36 stairs.

=== Transit connections ===
The following local bus routes can be found in close proximity to Columbia:

Bay	Location	Routes
1	Columbia Street; Westbound	102 New Westminster Station; 105 New Westminster Station; 109 New Westminster Station; N19 Downtown (NightBus service)
2	Columbia Street; Eastbound	109 Lougheed Station
3	4th Street; Northbound	102 Victoria Hill; 105 Uptown
