= Production Way–University station =

Metro Vancouver SkyTrain station

Production Way–University
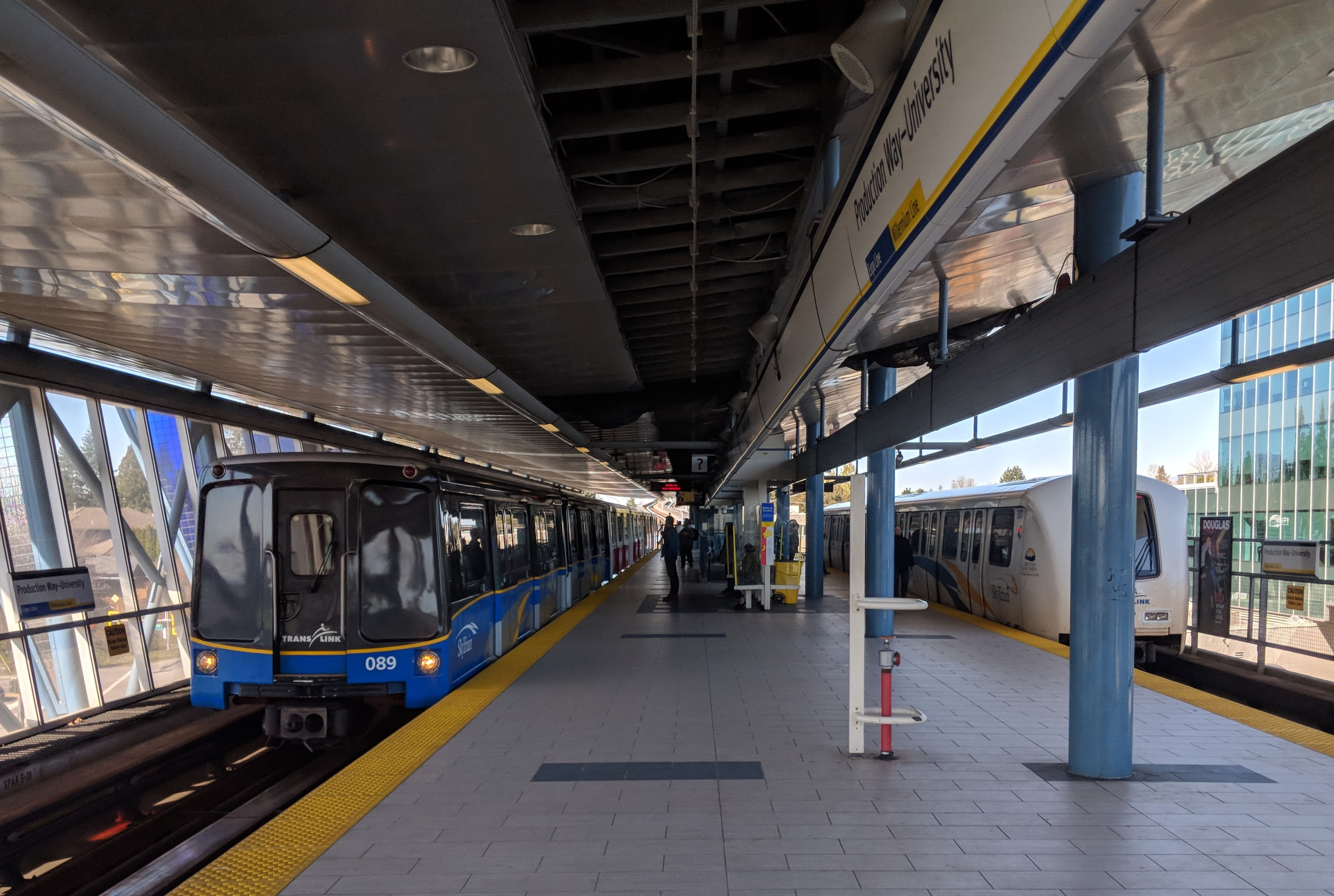
- Platform level at Production Way–University

General information
- Location: 3298 Production Way, Burnaby
- Coordinates: 49.25337°N 122.91815°W
- System: SkyTrain station
- Owner: TransLink
- Platforms: Centre platform
- Tracks: 2

Construction
- Structure type: Elevated
- Parking: 220
- Accessible: yes
- Architect: Hotson Bakker Architects

Other information
- Station code: PW
- Fare zone: 2

History
- Opened: August 31, 2002

Passengers
- 2025: 1,374,000 ▼4%
- Rank: 36 of 54

Services
Preceding station	TransLink	Following station
Lougheed Town Centre towards Waterfront via Columbia	Expo Line Lougheed branch	Terminus
Lake City Way towards VCC–Clark	Millennium Line	Lougheed Town Centre towards Lafarge Lake–Douglas
Location

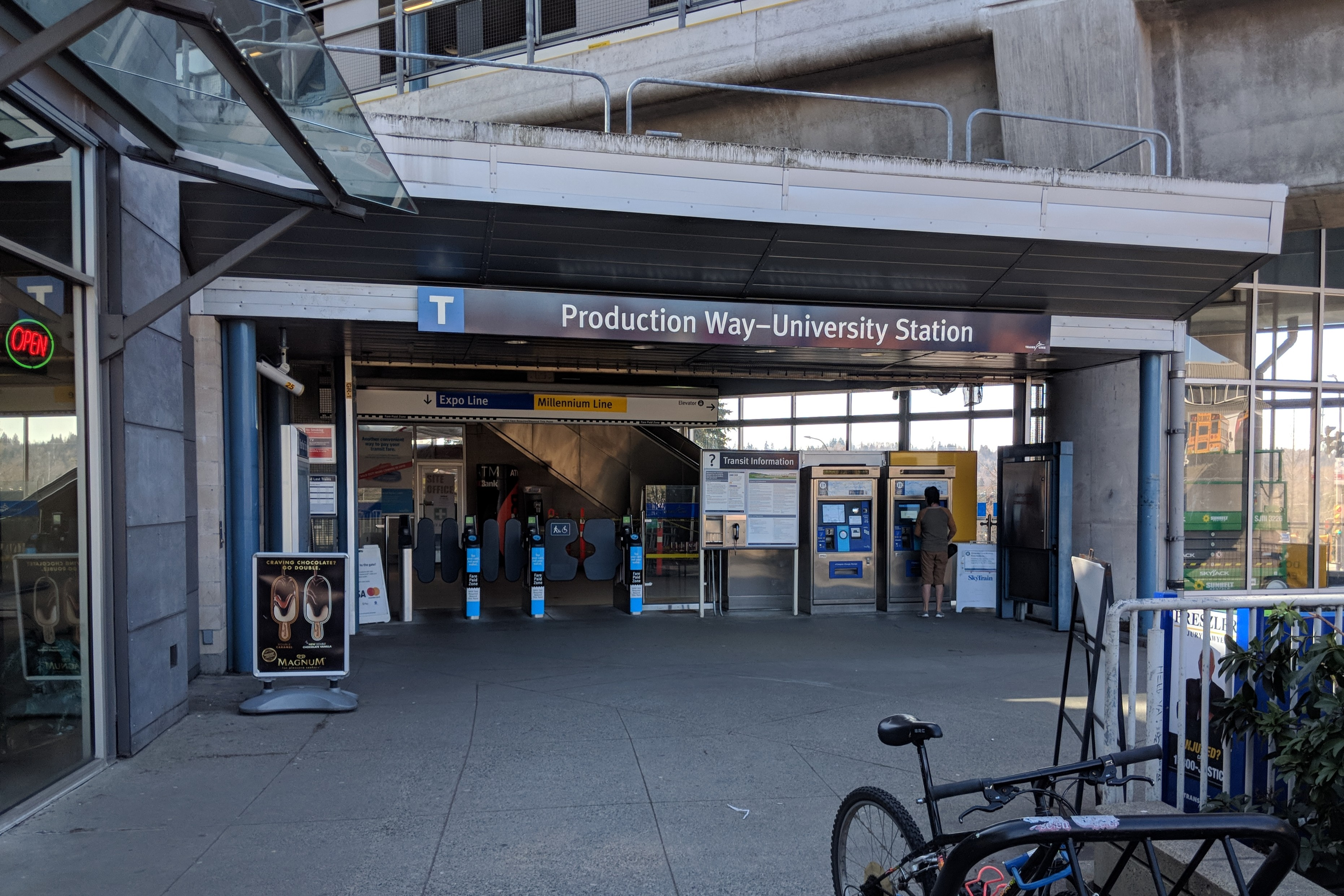
Production Way entrance

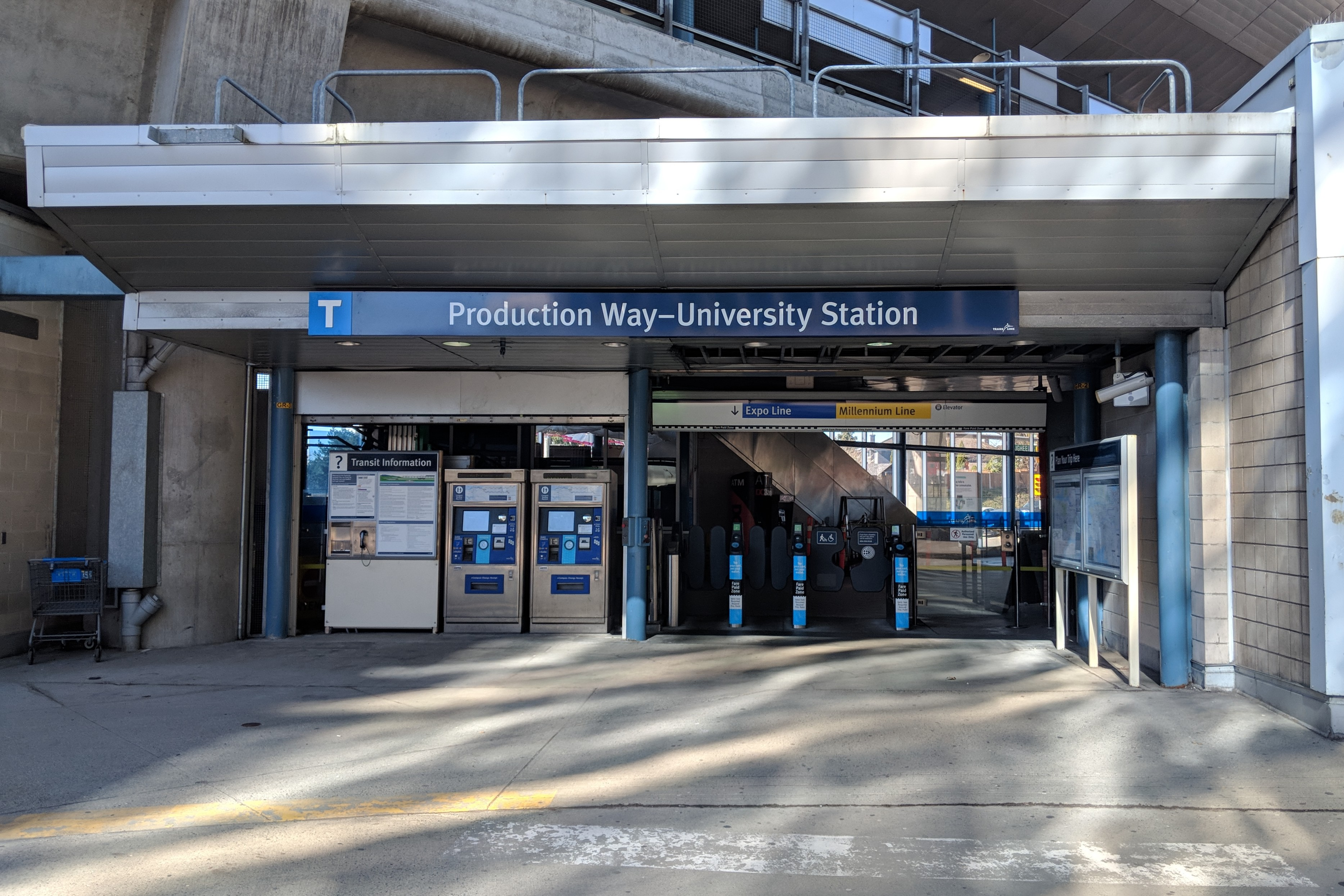
Bus exchange entrance

Production Way–University is an elevated station on the Expo and Millennium Lines of Metro Vancouver's SkyTrain rapid transit system. The station is located at the intersection of Lougheed Highway and Production Way in Burnaby, British Columbia, Canada. Initially a Millennium Line station, a reorganization of SkyTrain service patterns in 2016 made Production Way–University a terminus for a branch of the Expo Line.

== History ==
Production Way–University station was opened in 2002 as part of the original Millennium Line project. The station was designed by the architecture firm Hotson Bakker Architects.

In 2016, SkyTrain service was reconfigured in anticipation of the opening of the Evergreen Extension; as a result, Production Way–University station became a terminus station of an Expo Line branch running between this station and Waterfront station in downtown Vancouver. At the same time, the Millennium Line service was altered with trains running between VCC–Clark and Lougheed Town Centre stations – later extended to Lafarge Lake–Douglas station when service began on the Evergreen Extension – instead of the previous service between VCC–Clark and Waterfront stations.

== Services ==
Production Way–University station is a major transfer point for Simon Fraser University, as well as providing connections to local suburban buses. It is the terminus of the 145 bus route running to SFU, which carries just over half of all bus traffic to the university. The station's commercial spaces include a convenience store and several restaurants. The station also has a 220-space parking lot.

=== Proposed gondola ===
The SFU Community Trust has proposed extending the TransLink system from this station through the installation of a tri-cable gondola lift that would travel up Burnaby Mountain to the SFU Transit Exchange. The proposed lift would use a 30-passenger Doppelmayr Garaventa 3S Gondola, the same model as the Whistler Blackcomb Peak 2 Peak Gondola. The Trust has proposed the gondola because it felt the system is not weather-dependent like buses, cheaper to maintain, and more environmentally friendly. The provincial government commissioned a feasibility study for the proposal, but in 2012, a business case concluded that building and operating a gondola would cost $12 million more compared to continuing to serve the SFU campus by bus. Therefore, the construction of a gondola was shelved. In December 2018, Kevin Desmond, TransLink's CEO, indicated that while a gondola to SFU had been added to the second phase of the TransLink 10-Year Investment Plan in 2018, its construction hinged on funding from senior levels of government.

== Station information ==
As there is no crossover at the station itself, terminating Expo Line trains proceed to a crossover located 650 metres (2,130 ft) west of the station to reverse.

=== Entrances ===
The main point of entry to Production Way–University station is located on the western side of the stationhouse at the northeast corner of Production Way and Lougheed Highway. A secondary entrance is located adjacent to the stations bus exchange.

=== Transit connections ===
Bays 1 to 3 are located inside the loop while bay 4 is located on Lougheed Highway, westbound.

Bay	Route number	Destination
1	145	SFU; Loading only
2	110	Metrotown Station
2	136	Lougheed Station
2	N9	Coquitlam Station; NightBus
3	110	Lougheed Station
3	136	Brentwood Station
4	145	Production Way Station; Unloading only
4	N9	Downtown; NightBus
