= Chudnovsky =

Chudnovsky is an Ashkenazi Jewish surname of Ukrainian origin (meaning "from/born in Chudnov"). It may refer to

- Chudnovsky brothers, David and Gregory, mathematicians
  - Chudnovsky algorithm is a fast method for calculating the digits of π
- David Chudnovsky (politician) in Canada
- Maria Chudnovsky, mathematician
- Chudnofsky, the main villain of The Green Hornet (2011 film)
