= Ladian, Phillaur =

Ladian
- Village
- Location in Punjab, India Ladian (India)
- Coordinates: 30.9530457°N 75.7930094°E
- Country: India
- State: Punjab
- District: Jalandhar
- Tehsil: Phillaur

Government
  - Type: Panchayat raj
  - Body: Gram panchayat
- Elevation: 246 m (807 ft)

Population (2011)
  - Total: 575
- Sex ratio 288/287 ♂/♀

Languages
  - Official: Punjabi
- Time zone: UTC+5:30 (IST)
- PIN: 144502
- Telephone code: 01826
- ISO 3166 code: IN-PB
- Vehicle registration: PB 37
- Post office: Dosanjh Kalan
- Website: jalandhar.nic.in

Ladian or Ladhian is a village in the Phillaur tehsil of Jalandhar district, Punjab, India. It is located 36 km (22 mi) from the postal head office of Dosanjh Kalan, 9.8 km (6.1 mi) from Ludhiana, 53.4 km (33.2 mi) from Jalandhar and 108 km (67 mi) from the state capital Chandigarh. The village is administrated by a Sarpanch, an elected representative.

== Demographics ==
As of 2011, the village has a population size of 575. Schedule Castes constitute 61.04% of the population and there is no Scheduled Tribe population.

== Education ==
The village has a co-educational primary school which was founded in 1955. It provides a midday meal as per the Indian Midday Meal Scheme.

== Transport ==
=== Rail ===
Phillaur Junction is the nearest train station, 8.7 km (5.4 mi) away from the village. Bhattian Railway Station is 16.6 km (10.3 mi) away.

=== Air ===
The nearest domestic airport is located 24.5 km (15.2 mi) away in Ludhiana. The nearest international airport is located in Chandigarh; the second nearest is 148 km (92 mi) away in Amritsar.
