= David Chudnovsky =

David Chudnovsky may refer to:

- David Chudnovsky (mathematician) (born 1947), American mathematician
- David Chudnovsky (politician) (born 1949), Canadian politician
