= Kot Garewal =

- Village
- Location in Punjab, India Kot Garewal (India)
- Coordinates: 31.1524419°N 75.8370137°E
- Country: India
- State: Punjab
- District: Jalandhar
- Tehsil: Phillaur

Government
  - Type: Panchayat raj
  - Body: Gram panchayat
- Elevation: 246 m (807 ft)

Population (2011)
  - Total: 1,045
- Sex ratio 515/530 ♂/♀

Languages
  - Official: Punjabi
- Time zone: UTC+5:30 (IST)
- PIN: 144502
- Telephone code: 01826
- ISO 3166 code: IN-PB
- Vehicle registration: PB 37
- Post office: Dosanjh Kalan
- Website: jalandhar.nic.in

Kot Garewal is a village in the Phillaur tehsil of Jalandhar District of the Indian state of Punjab. It is located 2.7 kilometres (1.7 mi) away from the postal head office Dosanjh Kalan, 12 kilometres (7.5 mi) from Phagwara, 34 kilometres (21 mi) from Jalandhar, and 124 kilometres (77 mi) from the state capital of Chandigarh. The village is administered by the Sarpanch, an elected representative.

== Demographics ==
According to the 2011 Census, the village has a population of 1045. The village has a literacy rate of 82.17%, higher than the average literacy rate of Punjab.

Most villagers belong to a Schedule Caste (SC), comprising 69.57% of the total.

== Transport ==
=== Rail ===
The nearest railway station is 9.7 kilometres (6.0 mi) away in Goraya and Phagwara Jn railway station is 12 kilometres (7.5 mi) from the village.

=== Airport ===
The nearest airport is 61 kilometres (38 mi) away in Ludhiana. The nearest international airport is 128 kilometres (80 mi) away in Amritsar.
