= TransLink (British Columbia) =

Transportation authority in Metro Vancouver, Canada

South Coast British Columbia Transportation Authority

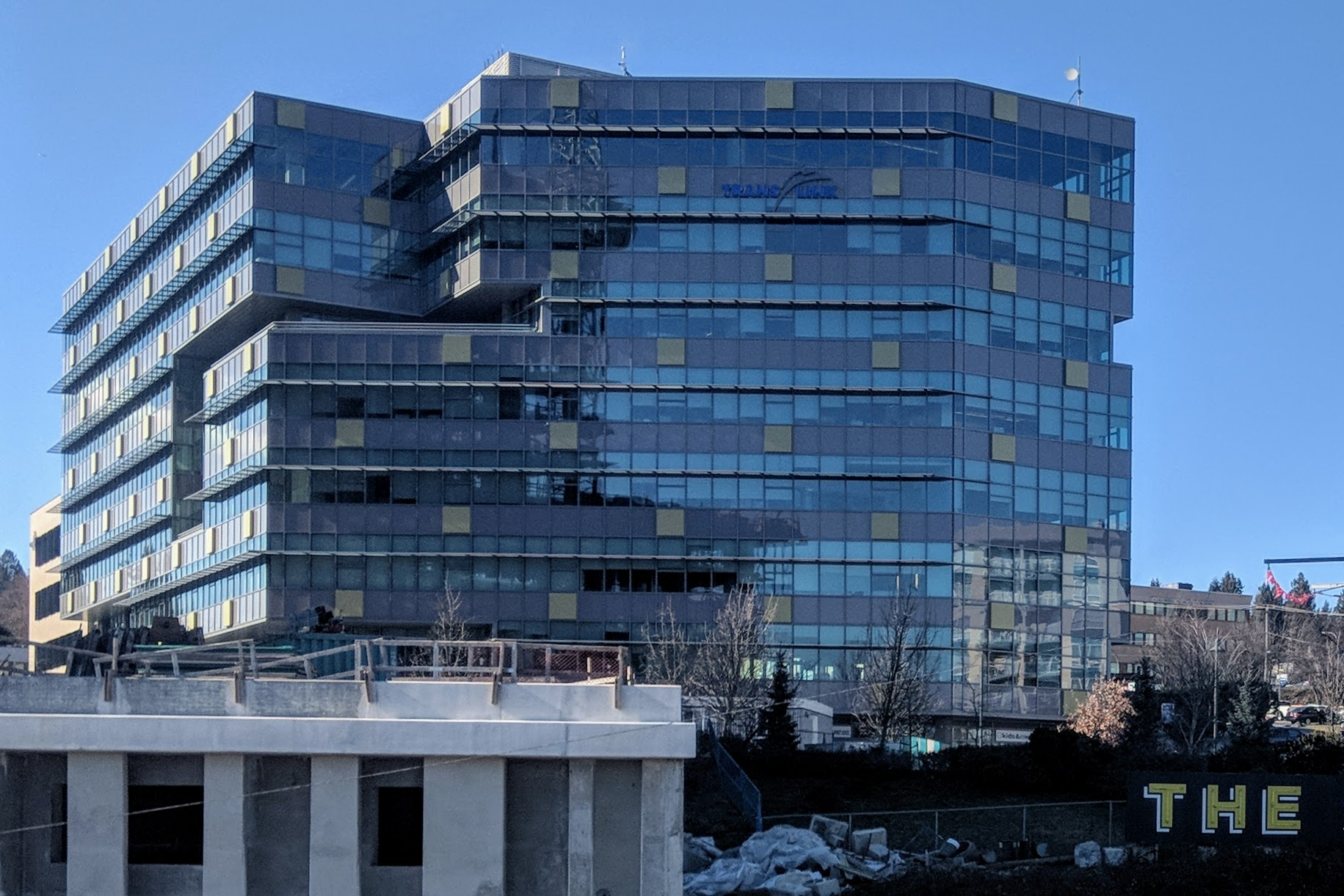
- TransLink's head office in New Westminster

Agency overview
- Formed: January 1, 1998; 28 years ago
- Preceding agency: Greater Vancouver Transportation Authority (1988–1998)
- Jurisdiction: Metro Vancouver
- Headquarters: 400 – 287 Nelson's Court New Westminster, British Columbia V3L 0E7
- Employees: 8,595
- Annual budget: $2.03 billion for 2022
- Minister responsible: Mike Farnworth, Minister of Transportation and Transit
- Agency executive: Kevin B. Quinn, CEO
- Website: www.translink.ca

The South Coast British Columbia Transportation Authority, operating as TransLink, is the statutory authority responsible for the regional transportation network of Metro Vancouver in British Columbia, Canada, including public transit, major roads and bridges. Its main operating facilities are located in the city of New Westminster.

TransLink was created in 1998 as the Greater Vancouver Transportation Authority (GVTA) and was fully implemented in April 1999 by the Government of British Columbia to replace BC Transit in the Greater Vancouver Regional District (now Metro Vancouver) and assume many transportation responsibilities previously held by the provincial government. TransLink is responsible for various modes of transportation in the Metro Vancouver region as well as the West Coast Express, which extends into the Fraser Valley Regional District (FVRD). On November 29, 2007, the province of British Columbia approved legislation changing the governance structure and official name of the organization.

== History ==
TransLink was created as the Greater Vancouver Transportation Authority, the statutory authority responsible for the regional transportation network of Metro Vancouver in British Columbia, Canada. Its domain includes public transit along with major roads and bridges. It was later renamed the South Coast British Columbia Transportation Authority.

=== 2007 reorganization ===
On March 8, 2007, BC Minister of Transportation Kevin Falcon announced a restructuring of TransLink. Major changes include new revenue-generating measures, a restructuring of the executive of the body, and increases in the areas under TransLink's jurisdiction.

The reorganization of TransLink proposed the following changes:

- The old board will be replaced by a Council of Mayors from the municipalities in the area served by TransLink, a board of non-political experts, and a regional transportation commissioner appointed by the Council of Mayors.
- The provincial government will set the regional transportation vision.
- The board will guide the operation of TransLink as per the 3- and 10-year transportation plans. It will also develop the options for 3- and 10-year plans; one option will be a base option that maintains the status quo.
- The Council of Mayors will vote on which 3- and 10-year transportation plan options to adopt. Mayors will receive one vote per 20,000 people or portion thereof in their jurisdiction.
- The TransLink independent commissioner will ensure that TransLink's 3- and 10-year transportation plans are consistent with the regional transportation vision set by the provincial government.
- TransLink's jurisdiction is initially planned to be expanded to include Mission, Abbotsford, and Squamish. In the long term, this may be further expanded to include the area along the Sea-to-Sky Highway as far north as Pemberton and east to Hope.
- TransLink will be funded using an approximate ratio of 1/3 of revenue from fuel taxes, 1/3 of revenue from property taxes, and 1/3 of revenue from other non-government sources (e.g., fares, advertising, property development).
- TransLink will hold the power to increase funding from fuel tax from 12 cents per litre (55 cents per Imp gal or 45 cents per US gal) to 15 cents per litre (68 cents per Imp gal or 57 cents per US gal). In 2012, the rate was increased to 17 cents.
- TransLink will increase funding by raising property taxes, parking sales taxes, and other sources of revenue (e.g., fares, property development).
- TransLink will eliminate the parking tax (different from parking sales tax) and the BC Hydro transportation levy.
- AirCare will be removed from TransLink's authority and will become the responsibility of Metro Vancouver.
- The provincial government will continue to contribute toward rapid transit projects, but funding will be contingent on municipalities increasing population densities around planned rapid transit stations.

Falcon had called the old board "dysfunctional", saying that board members were focused on the interests of their own municipalities instead of the broader interests of the region. According to Falcon, the board of directors had "no ability there to develop the skill-set to understand major, multi-billion projects." British Columbia New Democratic Party critic David Chudnovsky responded that the reorganization was "ludicrous" and that its purpose was "to get power away from our elected municipal politicians because once in a while they disagree with the aggressive privatization agenda of Mr. Falcon". Chudnovsky was also worried about the consequences of a property development slowdown.

On April 26, 2007, the provincial government introduced legislation to restructure TransLink. The proposed successor body was to be known as the South Coast British Columbia Transportation Authority. The legislation received Royal Assent on November 29, 2007, and came into effect on January 1, 2008, with some parts of the organization, like the Council of Mayors, beginning functions the day after the legislation was approved.

On March 19, 2008, the Vancouver Sun reported that TransLink was launching a real estate division that could produce over CA$1.5 billion in revenue over the ensuing ten years.

NDP critic Maurine Karagianis introduced a private member's bill dubbed the "TransLink Openness Act".

=== 2015 plebiscite ===
In 2015, residents of Metro Vancouver were asked to vote in a mail-in plebiscite on a proposal to adopt a new 0.5 percent sales tax to fund improvements in transit infrastructure, and completion of current TransLink projects. Ballots were mailed in March, and had to be returned by 8:00 pm on May 29, 2015.

The tax was designed to generate annual revenue of $250 million to help fund an $8 billion, 10-year transit plan including the following projects:

- Adding bus service and 11 new B-Line rapid bus routes
- Increasing service on SkyTrain, SeaBus, and West Coast Express
- Maintaining and upgrading of major roads
- Building a new Pattullo Bridge
- Building LRT connecting Surrey Centre with Guildford, Newton, and Langley
- Extending the Millennium Line along Broadway in Vancouver
- Extending cycling and pedestrian walkway networks

The tax was supported by environmental groups, student groups and nearly every local government. Opposition to the tax was headed by the Canadian Taxpayers Federation who drew the public's attention to purported misuse of funds by TransLink. Supporters countered with other analyses that showed TransLink to be ranked first by cost per service hour, service hours per $1 million and service hours per capita. The Yes campaign outspent the No campaign by $5.8 million to $40,000. Surveys conducted by Insights West showed the Yes side ahead in December 2014, but support dropped to 37 percent the week before the ballots were mailed. After the failure of the plebiscite, several executives at TransLink were removed from their positions.

==== Results ====
Response	Votes	%
No	467,032	61.68
Yes	290,151	38.32
Total valid votes	757,183	100.00
Invalid or blank votes	2,513	0.33
Turnout	759,696	48.62
Electorate	1,562,386	
Source: Elections BC

Results by municipality
City	Votes		Percent	
City	Yes	No	Yes	No
Bowen Island	847	521	61.92	38.08
Burnaby	24,355	45,113	35.06	64.94
Coquitlam	14,200	29,120	32.78	67.22
Delta	11,589	24,448	32.16	67.84
Langley City	2,226	5,807	27.71	72.29
Maple Ridge	6,404	21,470	22.97	77.03
New Westminster	10,623	12,748	45.45	54.55
North Vancouver City	7,931	9,725	44.92	55.08
Pitt Meadows	1,762	4,568	27.84	72.16
Port Coquitlam	6,346	13,394	32.15	67.85
Port Moody	4,852	6,534	42.61	57.39
Richmond	16,257	42,615	27.61	72.39
Surrey	42,519	80,851	34.46	65.54
Vancouver	103,431	106,818	49.19	50.81
White Rock	3,139	4,566	40.74	59.26
North Vancouver District	14,569	18,093	44.61	55.39
West Vancouver	6,876	8,711	44.11	55.89
Electoral Area A	1,586	1,122	58.57	41.43
Langley Township	9,890	29,619	25.03	74.97
Tsawwassen	86	167	33.99	66.01
Anmore	303	497	37.88	62.13
Belcarra	158	145	52.15	47.85
Lions Bay	202	380	34.71	65.29
Total votes	290,151	467,032	38.32	61.68
Source: Elections BC

=== 10-Year Investment Plan ===
After the failure of the 2015 plebiscite, TransLink developed the 10-Year Investment Plan in 2017. The plan was structured to be delivered in three phases over ten years, starting in April 2017.

==== As originally released ====
Phase one was scheduled to be rolled out between 2017 and 2026, and it included the launch of five new B-Lines, and service improvements on buses, SkyTrain, SeaBus, and HandyDART. TransLink planned to purchase 171 more buses, 50 new SkyTrain cars, five new West Coast Express passenger cars, and one new SeaBus vessel. It also provided funding for improved roads, cycling paths, and sidewalks.

Phase two was scheduled to be rolled out between 2018 and 2027, and it included the construction of the Broadway SkyTrain extension, the construction of the Surrey–Newton–Guildford LRT, the launch of two more B-Lines, the replacement of the Pattullo Bridge, pre-construction of the Surrey–Langley LRT, and more rail and station upgrades on the existing SkyTrain network. It also included continued service improvements on buses and HandyDART, and continued funding for improved roads, cycling paths, and sidewalks.

Phase three is the final delivery of the 10-Year Investment Plan, which was scheduled to be rolled out between 2020 and 2030. It included four new B-Lines, more service improvements on buses, SkyTrain, and HandyDART service. It also included the construction of the Surrey–Langley LRT as well as continued funding for improved roads, cycling paths, and sidewalks.

==== Implementation and alterations ====
Phase one was approved by the Mayors' Council in November 2016; implementation began in January 2017. Phase two was approved in June 2018, and phase three is scheduled for approval in 2019.

In November 2018, the Surrey light rail system, including the Surrey–Newton–Guildford (SNG) route and the Surrey–Langley route, was rejected by Surrey City Council after a municipal government change that saw Doug McCallum return to the city's mayorship. McCallum had campaigned on cancelling the plans for light rail and instead extending the Expo Line from King George station to Langley. This plan was approved by the Mayors' Council in principle that same month, but the $1.65 billion in funding that was earmarked for the light rail project, which was intended to be repurposed to construct the extension to Langley, was determined to be insufficient to fund the entire extension, with $1.9 billion more needed to complete the project. The existing funding would only extend the line 7 kilometres (4.3 mi) to Fleetwood in Surrey and add four new stations, terminating at 166th Street. In July 2019, the Mayors' Council voted to extend the Expo Line to Fleetwood using these existing funds. The council also voted to proceed with preparing a detailed business case for the full Surrey–Langley SkyTrain extension, which was expected to be completed by early 2020. The extension is a 16-kilometre (9.9 mi) elevated extension of the Expo Line along Fraser Highway from King George station in Surrey to Langley City Centre, with eight new stations. Major construction began in November 2024 and is ongoing as of 2026, with revenue service expected to begin in 2029.

== Transit services ==
A geographic map of the major routes of TransLink's network

=== Buses ===
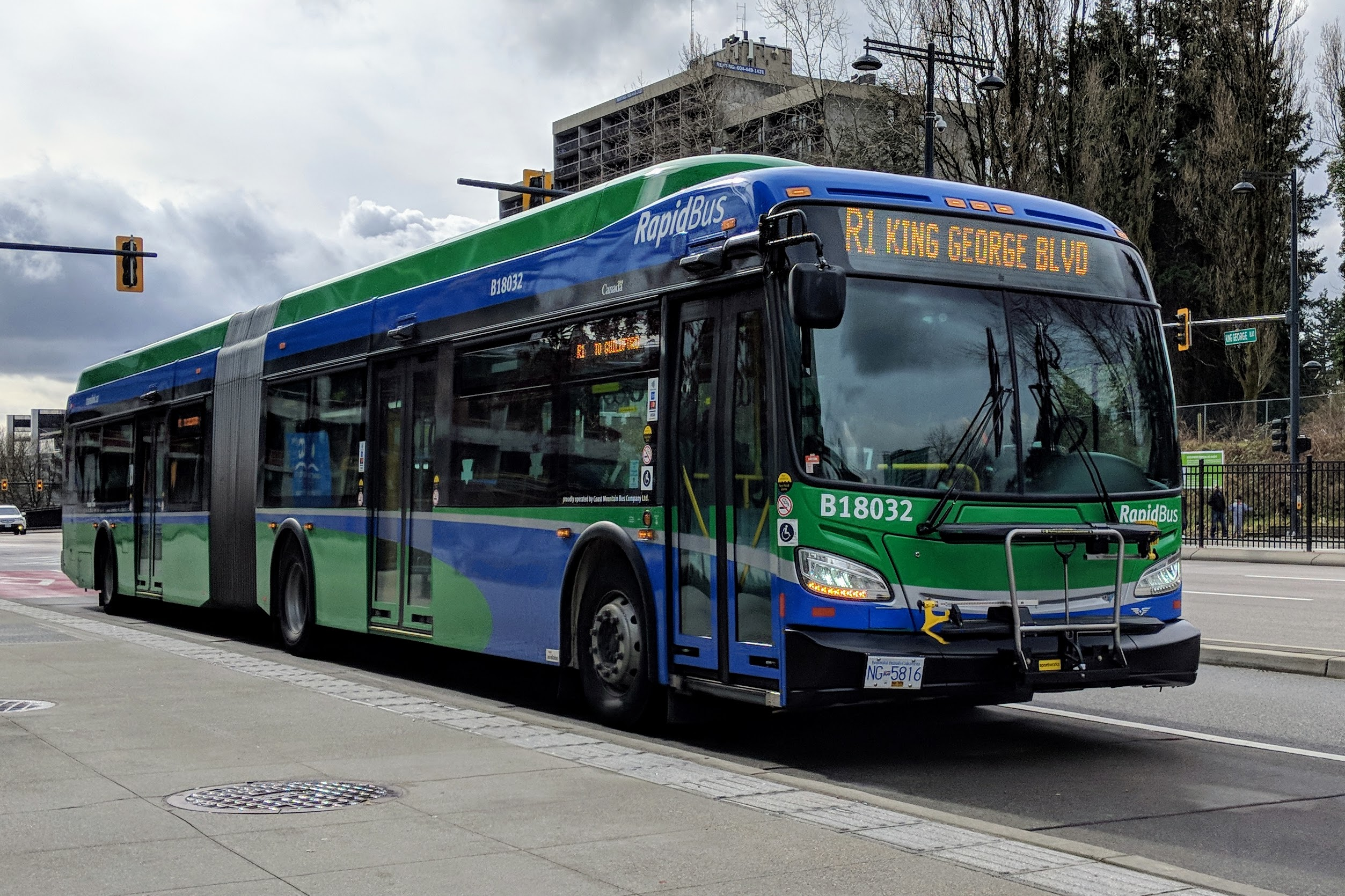
The R1 King George Blvd RapidBus service is one of the busiest routes in TransLink's network.

Buses in Metro Vancouver are operated by three companies. Coast Mountain Bus Company operates regular transit buses, generally powered by diesel or natural gas, in most of the region's municipalities, in addition to trolley buses, primarily within the city of Vancouver. The District Municipality of West Vancouver operates the Blue Bus system serving West Vancouver and Lions Bay. Transdev is contracted by TransLink to operate nine community shuttle bus routes in Langley and on Bowen Island, in addition to operating all HandyDART services in Metro Vancouver. The schedules, fares, and routes of these services are integrated with other transit services operated by TransLink.

Within the city of Vancouver, buses generally run on a grid system, with most trolley bus routes operating radially out of downtown and along north–south arteries, and most diesel buses providing east–west crosstown service, with the University of British Columbia (UBC) as their western terminus. Outside the city of Vancouver, most buses operate on a hub-and-spoke system along feeder routes that connect with SkyTrain, SeaBus, West Coast Express, or other regional centres. Six high-capacity, high-frequency RapidBus express routes use mostly 18.3-metre (60 ft) articulated buses, rounding out the regional public transportation backbone provided by SkyTrain, SeaBus, and West Coast Express.

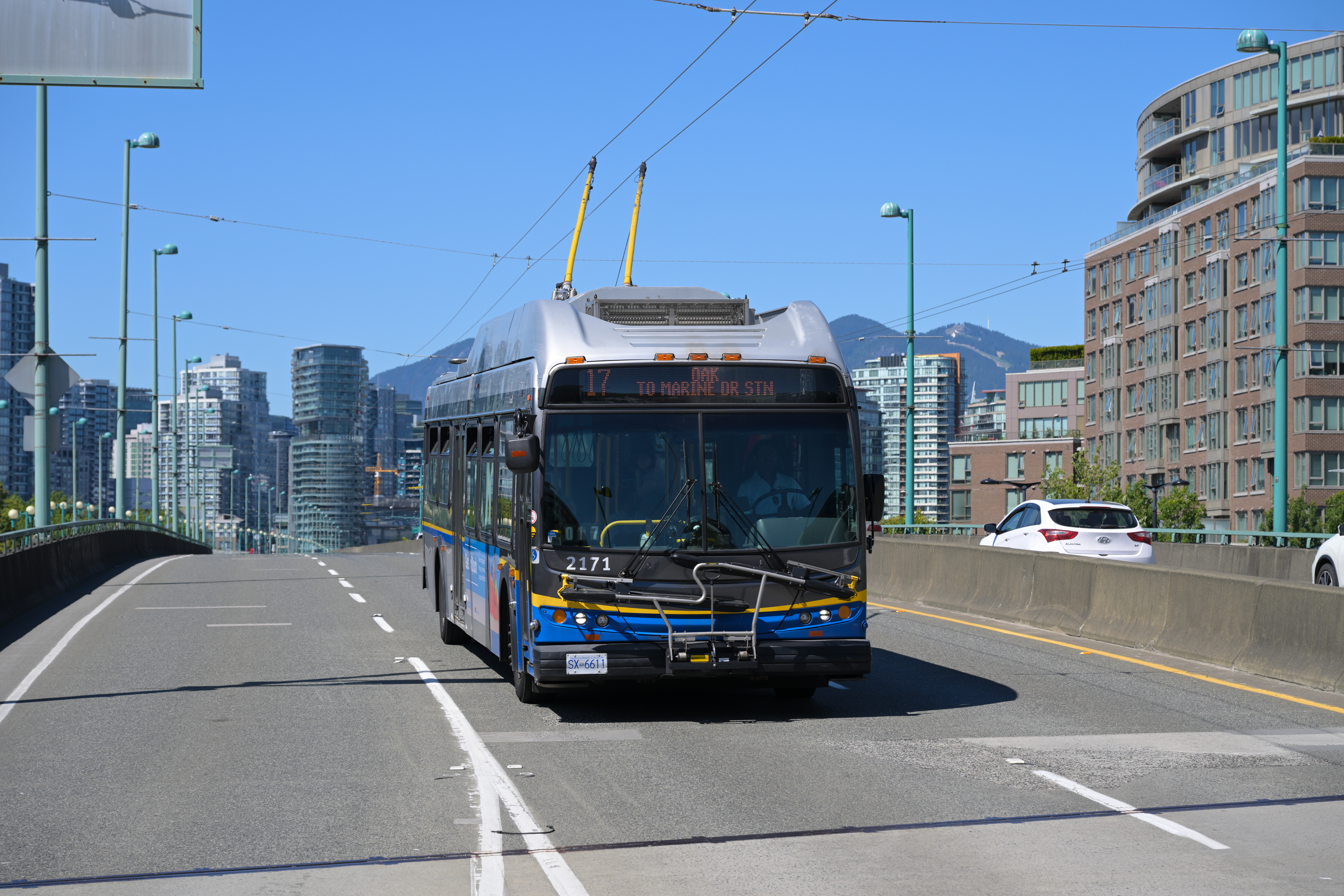
TransLink operates the only trolley bus system in Canada, with 13 routes.

Electric trolley buses operate on major routes in the city of Vancouver, with one route extending to neighbouring Burnaby. Most trolley bus routes operate in a north–south direction. Trolley buses receive electricity from a network of overhead wires. In the fall of 2006, TransLink introduced a new generation of electric trolley buses, replacing the old models built in the early 1980s. The new trolley buses have low floors and are fully wheelchair accessible.

Many local routes are served by buses manufactured by New Flyer and Nova Bus. TransLink has begun using hybrid diesel-electric buses. Some suburban routes use Orion highway coaches with high-back reclining seats, overhead reading lights and luggage racks. After a successful pilot project through 2017 and 2018, TransLink announced the purchase of 32 Alexander Dennis Enviro500 double-decker buses. TransLink began using double-decker buses to serve the 555, 620, and 301 routes. More double-decker buses were deployed to more routes starting in September 2020.

In 2007, all TransLink buses became designated fare paid zones. Under this system, a rider is required to be in possession of a valid fare (transfer or transit pass) while on board the bus and produce it upon request by a transit official. Enforcement of fares is conducted by Transit Security officers. On all RapidBuses, as well as the 99 B-Line, larger, 18.3-metre (60 ft), three-door buses allow passengers to board through rear doors. As they are bypassing the driver and fare box, they must have a valid fare in their possession. On all other buses, passengers are required to board through the front doors and should produce a valid fare to the bus driver. Fare inspections on buses are normally conducted by Transit Security officers and on occasion by the South Coast British Columbia Transportation Authority Police Service. Failure to produce proof of payment may result in ejection from the bus and/or a fine of $173.

TransLink also operates a late-night bus service, called NightBus, on 10 routes extending from downtown throughout the city and to several suburbs. NightBuses leave downtown Vancouver until 4:30 a.m. Transit Security officers ride some of the night buses and respond to calls onboard others. These buses are popular since SkyTrain ends service at 1:30 a.m. but downtown clubs and bars do not close until 3 a.m.

=== SkyTrain ===
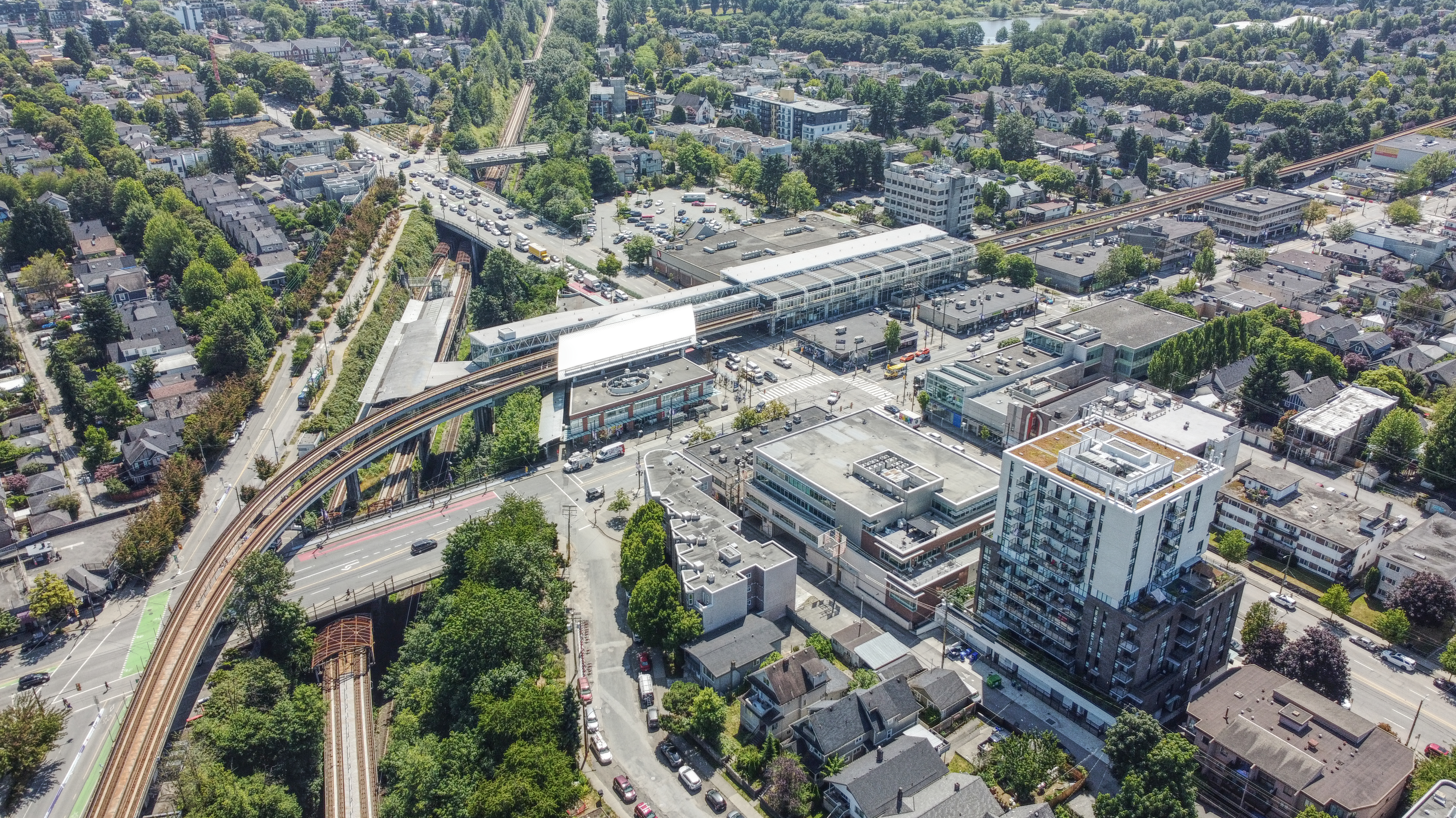
Aerial view of Commercial–Broadway station, a major transfer point

The first SkyTrain line, which later became known as the Expo Line, was built in 1985 as a transit showcase for Expo 86. The automated rapid transit system has become an important part of the region's transportation network. The Expo Line operates from downtown Vancouver to southern Burnaby, New Westminster, and Surrey.

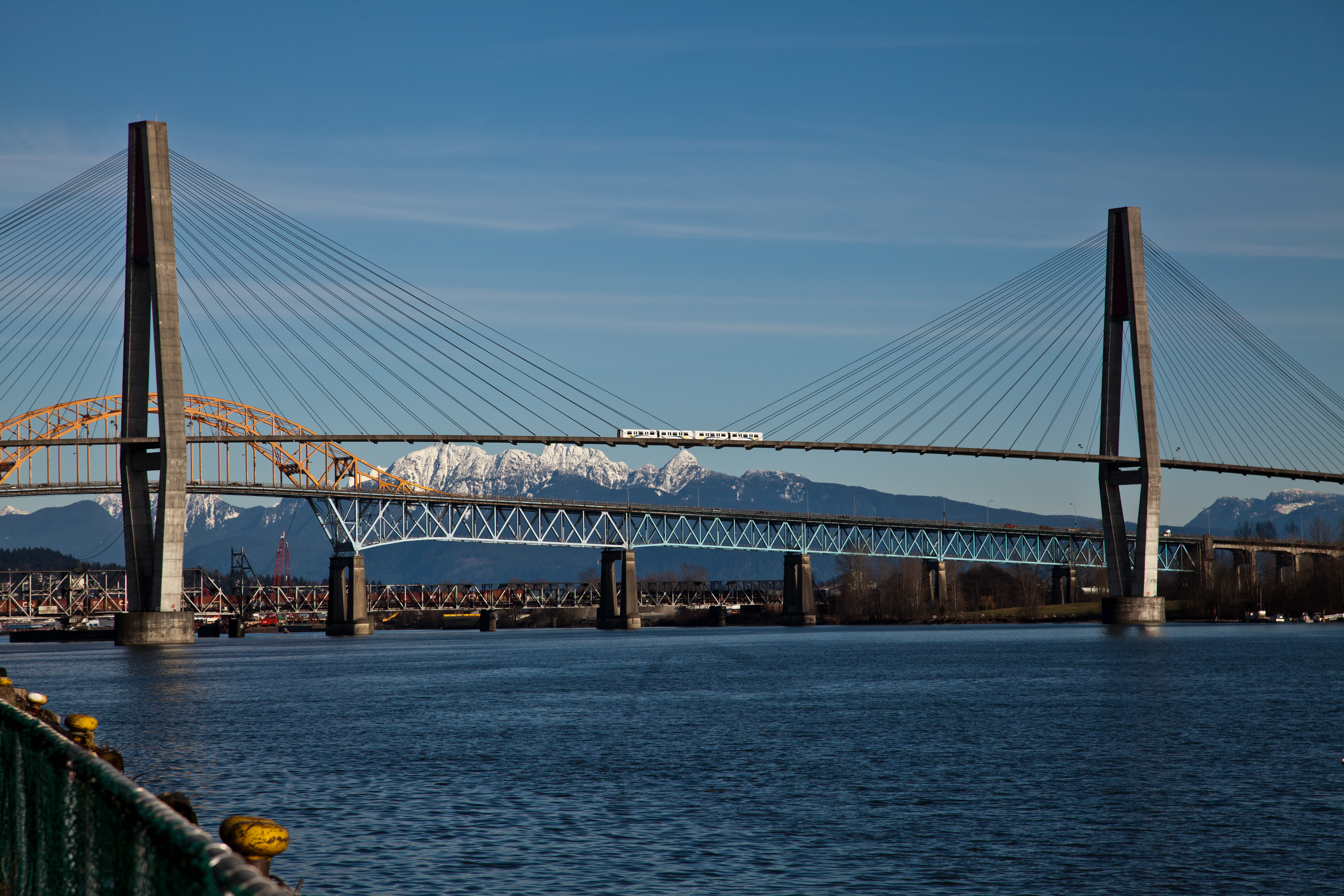
The SkyBridge carries the Expo Line over the Fraser River.

The system was expanded with the opening of the Millennium Line in 2002, which connects Coquitlam, Port Moody, Burnaby, and Vancouver. Construction on the Evergreen Extension of the Millennium Line began in 2012 and completed in 2016, expanding service from Lougheed Town Centre to Coquitlam.

The Canada Line, which was opened on August 17, 2009, runs underground through Vancouver and then along an elevated guideway with two branches, to Richmond and Vancouver International Airport. It meets the Expo Line at Waterfront station in downtown Vancouver, but it is operationally independent and there is no track connection between them.

The Expo Line and Millennium Line are operated by British Columbia Rapid Transit Company Ltd., a subsidiary of TransLink. The Canada Line is operated by ProTrans BC, a division of SNC-Lavalin.

=== West Coast Express ===
The West Coast Express is a commuter railway connecting downtown Vancouver to Metro Vancouver municipalities to the east and terminating in Mission in the FVRD, north of the Fraser River. It is operated by the British Columbia Rapid Transit Company.

=== SeaBus ===
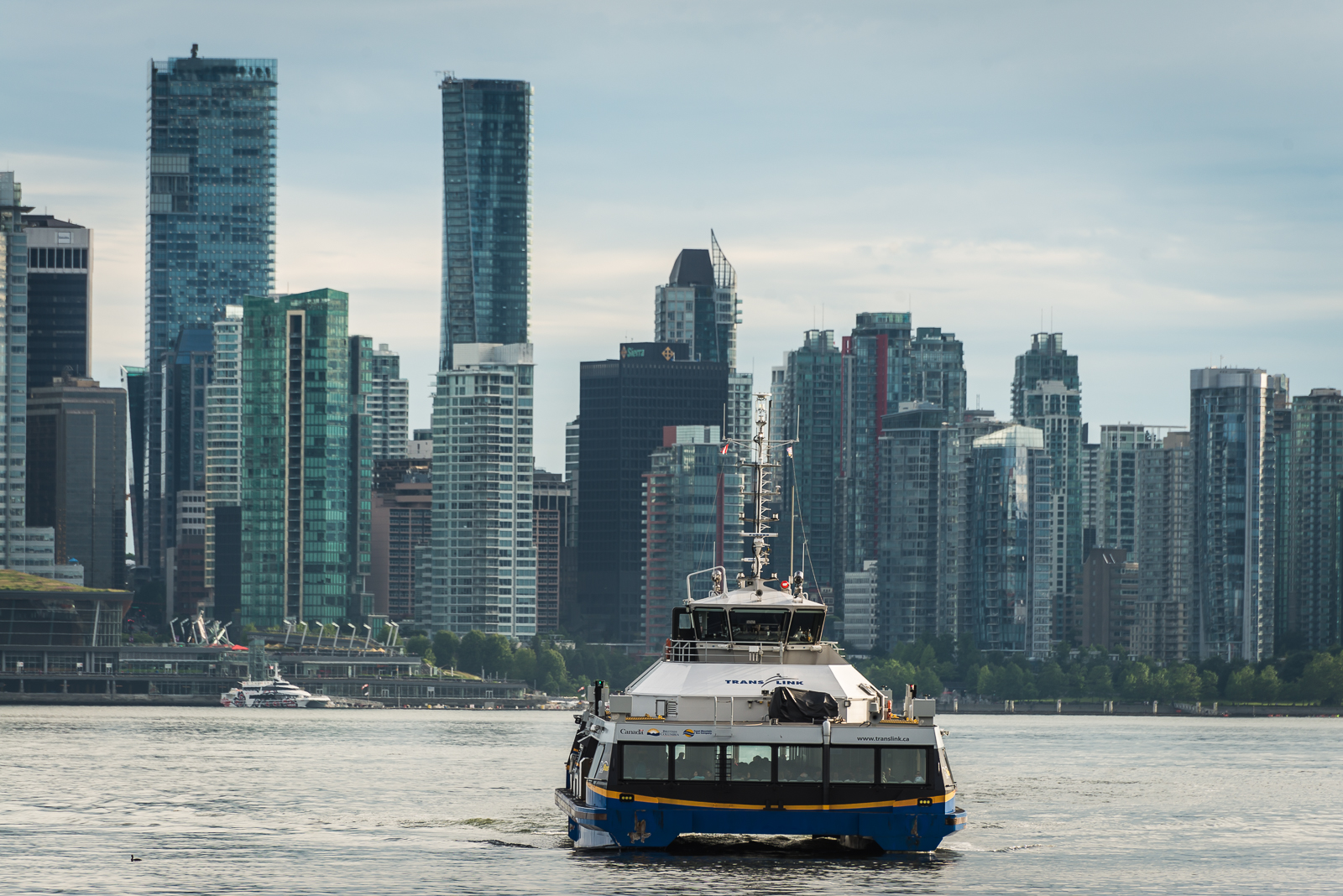
SeaBus with the Downtown Vancouver skyline

SeaBus is a passenger ferry service across Burrard Inlet between Vancouver and the North Shore municipalities that is operated by Coast Mountain Bus Company and integrated with the transit system. It holds approximately 400 people and sails every 10 minutes during rush hour.

== Fares ==
TransLink fare map

Fares depend on how many fare zones a passenger passes through and they differ for those paying with stored value on their Compass cards versus those paying by cash or contactless credit card. Cash and stored value fares are the same for concession riders. Cash and contactless credit card fares are equal. Fares were last increased on July 1, 2026.

TransLink fares from July 1, 2026
Fare type	One zone	Two zones	Three zones
Adult (cash)	$3.50	$5.10	$6.70
Adult (stored value)	$2.85	$4.20	$5.40
Concession	$2.30	$3.40	$4.60

Historical TransLink fares
Fare type	One zone	Two zones	Three zones
As of July 1, 2025
Adult (cash)	$3.35	$4.85	$6.60
Adult (stored value)	$2.70	$4.00	$5.10
Concession	$2.25	$3.30	$4.50
As of July 1, 2024
Adult (cash)	$3.20	$4.65	$6.35
Adult (stored value)	$2.60	$3.85	$4.90
Concession	$2.15	$3.15	$4.35
As of July 1, 2023
Adult (cash)	$3.15	$4.55	$6.20
Adult (stored value)	$2.55	$3.75	$4.80
Concession	$2.10	$3.10	$4.25
As of July 1, 2022
Adult (cash)	$3.10	$4.35	$6.05
Adult (stored value)	$2.50	$3.65	$4.70
Concession	$2.05	$3.05	$4.15
As of July 1, 2021
Adult (cash)	$3.00	$4.25	$5.75
Adult (stored value)	$2.40	$3.45	$4.50
Concession	$1.95	$2.95	$3.95
As of July 1, 2019
Adult (cash)	$3.00	$4.25	$5.75
Adult (stored value)	$2.40	$3.45	$4.50
Concession	$1.95	$2.95	$3.95
As of July 1, 2018
Adult (cash)	$2.95	$4.20	$5.70
Adult (stored value)	$2.30	$3.35	$4.40
Concession	$1.90	$2.90	$3.90
As of July 1, 2017
Adult (cash)	$2.85	$4.10	$5.60
Adult (stored value)	$2.20	$3.25	$4.30
Concession	$1.80	$2.80	$3.80
As of January 2013
Adult	$2.75	$4.00	$5.50
Concession	$1.75	$2.75	$3.75
As of January 2008
Adult	$2.50	$3.75	$5.00
Concession	$1.75	$2.50	$3.50

Compass card holders and those with Compass transfers (issued by Compass vending machines at SkyTrain, SeaBus, and West Coast Express stations) are permitted unlimited transfers within a 90-minute period on the bus or on SkyTrain or SeaBus. All buses are considered one-zone fares, but cash fares on buses are not transferable to the SkyTrain or SeaBus owing to technological incompatibility between bus fare box–issued transfers and Compass fare readers. Zone fares apply weekdays before 6:30 p.m. During evenings and on weekends, passengers can travel throughout the system on a one-zone fare.

There is a $6.50 surcharge, the "YVR AddFare", applied to most fares paid at Canada Line stations on Sea Island—YVR–Airport, Sea Island Centre, and Templeton—for eastbound trips to Bridgeport station or beyond. Trips using a monthly pass are exempt, as are trips using DayPasses purchased and activated off Sea Island. Trips to the three stations are not subject to the surcharge. Trips between the three Sea Island stations are free.

Beginning September 2021, fares were adjusted so to that children aged 13 and younger were permitted to ride for free. Concession fares apply to youths aged 14–18 with identification proving age, and seniors aged 65 and over. Students from all public post-secondary institutions in the Lower Mainland, with the exception of the Justice Institute of British Columbia, receive a U-Pass, which is included in student fees. The pass is valid across all three zones.

=== Fare paid zones ===
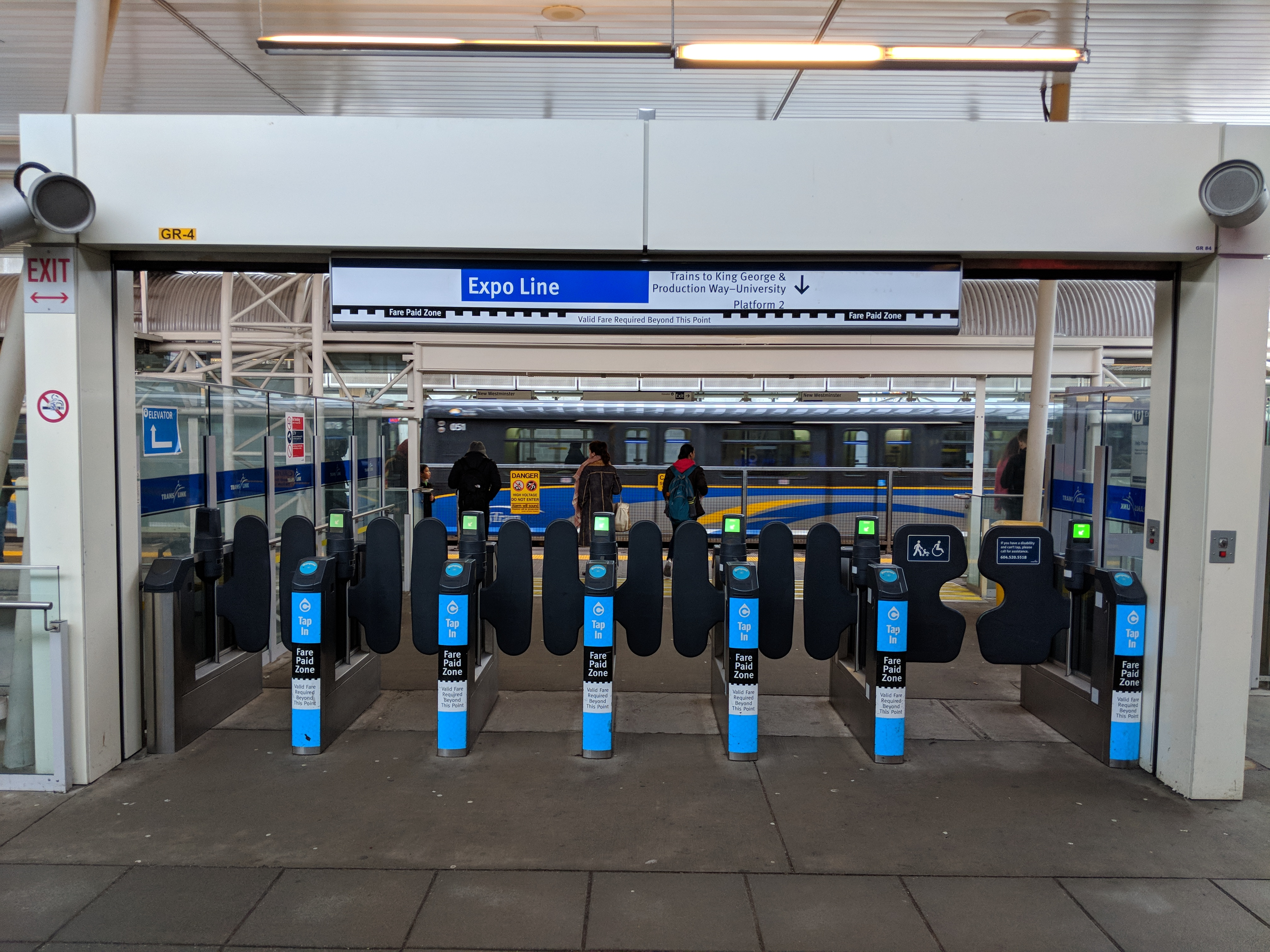
Fare gates at New Westminster station

A fare paid zone is a clearly marked territory on which passengers must have valid proof of payment and produce it for inspection upon request of a Transit Employee. Initially, these were only in effect in SkyTrain and SeaBus stations and vehicles until June 25, 2007, when the law was changed. Now, all buses, including West Vancouver buses, are designated fare paid zones. The reason for implementing fare paid zones on buses was to remove the responsibility of fare enforcement from bus drivers, as too many of them were being assaulted in disputes over fare payment. Fare enforcement on all buses are now the responsibility of the Transit Police and Transit Security Department. Officers may conduct a fare inspection at any time. Those who fail to pay the fare or fail to produce a valid fare could be removed from the transit system and/or fined $173. Currently, only Transit Security and Transit Police have the authority to issue fare evasion fines. Customer Service Attendants and other transit employees may request compliance in regards to fares, but have no authority to issue a fine.

Failure to pay the fare or produce valid proof of payment is an offence. Fare inspections are conducted by the South Coast British Columbia Transportation Authority Police Service and Transit Security. Fraudulent use of fares (e.g., using a fake pass, using another person's non-transferable pass,) may result in criminal charges. Passengers found without a valid fare or who fail to produce valid proof of payment are served with an infraction ticket of $173, under the fare collection regulation. In September 2012, amendments to the South Coast British Columbia Transportation Authority Act came into effect, making TransLink responsible for collection of fines issued by Transit Police and Transit Security. Since October 5, 2015, all bus travel is considered one-zone travel and no additional fares are required for crossing fare boundaries on the bus.

On April 4, 2016, TransLink's new fare gates were implemented for ridership on SkyTrain and SeaBus. To open the fare gates, to enter or exit the system, a Compass card or Compass ticket (purchased from a Compass vending machine) must be used. Compass cards may be used to pay fares on and buses, although FareSaver tickets may still be used on buses. Paper passes continue to be issued on buses for fares paid in cash. Neither FareSavers nor the transfer tickets may be used to open fare gates. Compass cards work on all transit services using a tap in method to pay fares. Tap out however is not required on buses. The cards may be loaded with monthly passes, day passes, or stored value, or any combination, with the ability to auto-load the fare choice. Annual passes have been eliminated.

After the December 2015 TransLink announcement that the gates would close on April 4, 2016, groups working with those who have disabilities complained about potential accessibility problems with the fare gate system. TransLink's response was to have staff assist those with disabilities enter or exit the system, or to leave the gates open when staff were not present. This lasted until July 25, 2016, when the gates were fully closed. No data have been presented to indicate if the system has reduced fare evasion, estimated at between $6 and $7 million per year, which was the promise of the new $194 million system, although preliminary data showed that revenue had increased by 7 percent after its introduction.

On May 22, 2018, the ability to pay with contactless Visa and Mastercard credit cards (including mobile payment software) was added to Compass readers. Fares paid in this manner are charged at the full cash fares.

=== COVID-19 response ===
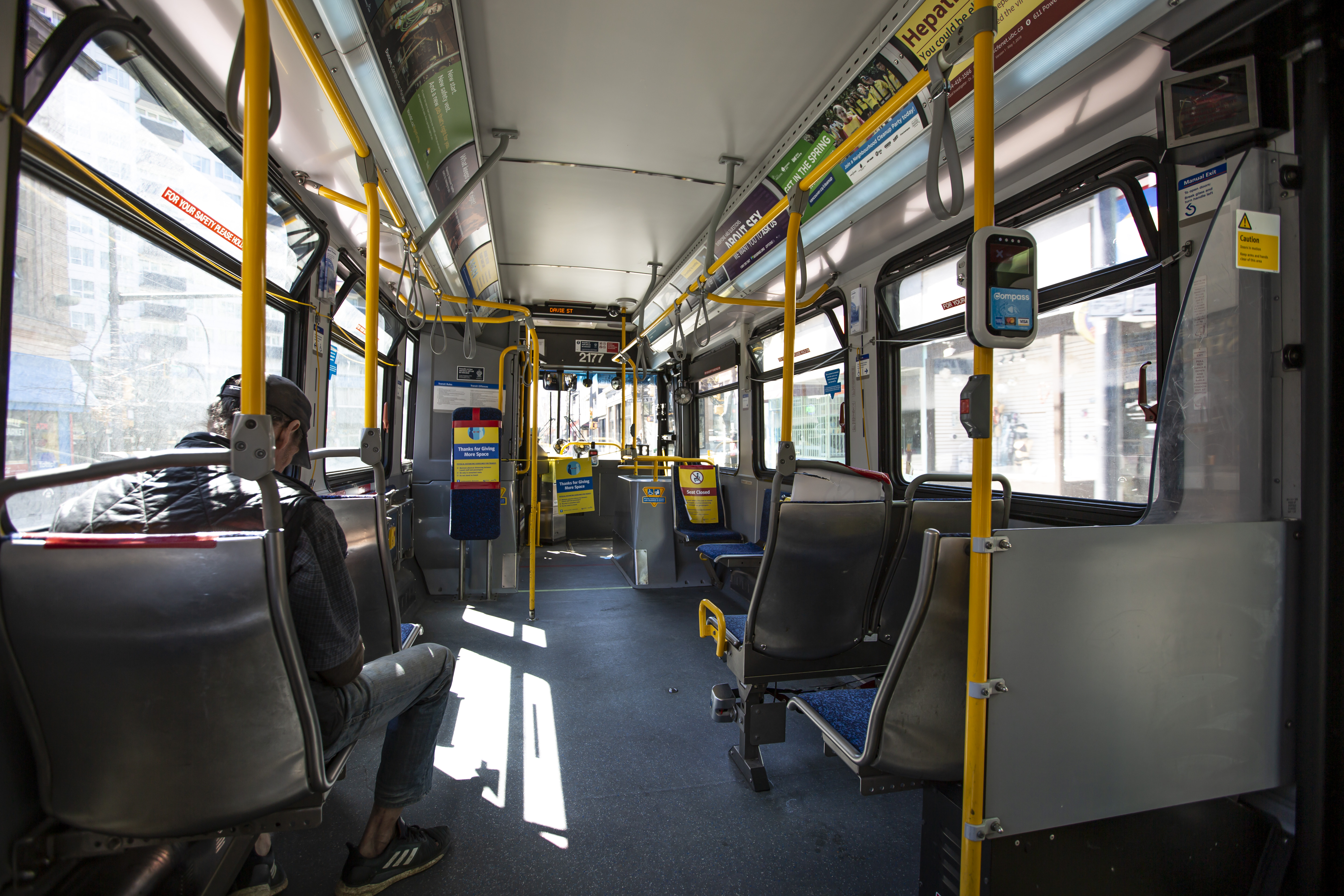
During the COVID-19 pandemic, TransLink blocked seats on buses and suspended fare collection.

On March 20, 2020, TransLink suspended fare collection on all buses indefinitely in an effort to respond to the COVID-19 pandemic in the province, specifically to meet physical distancing requirements in combating the spread of COVID-19. Part of the measures included allowing the boarding and alighting of passengers only via a bus' rear door, which lack the means to collect cash fares. Those needing mobility assistance could continue boarding through the front door. TransLink later reduced capacity on all buses by 50 percent to further physical distancing goals. No changes to fares or capacity were implemented for the SeaBus, the SkyTrain or the West Coast Express. On June 1, 2020, TransLink resumed fare collection on buses, citing improved safety features for drivers and the over $2 million a month in lost revenue due to the fare suspension.

== Ridership ==
TransLink system-wide ridership by year
Year	2018	2019	2020	2021	2022	2023	2024	2025
Trips (millions)	435.9 (Note: Ridership totals reflect revised final totals published in the following year's Q4 ridership reports. All subsequent ridership totals are derived from following-year Q4 ridership reports (except where indicated in the year's title reference).)	451.3	220.3 (Note: Represents a significant ridership decrease from prior years owing to the impact of the COVID-19 pandemic on public transport.)	223.4	325.4	391.6	404.2	396.4
View chart definition.

TransLink ridership by mode, 2024
Mode	Trips	% of total	View chart definition.
SkyTrain	149,066,500	37.00	View chart definition.
West Coast Express	1,559,100	0.39	View chart definition.
SeaBus	5,398,900	1.34	View chart definition.
Bus	246,877,500	61.30	View chart definition.
Total	402,902,000 (Note: Represents a significant ridership decrease compared to pre-2020 levels owing to the impact of the COVID-19 pandemic on public transport.)	100.00	View chart definition.

== Transit security ==
Coast Mountain Bus Company operates TransLink's Transit Security department. Transit security officers are mobile, ride buses and trains, inspect fares, issue fines and patrol TransLink properties. They work closely with transit police to ensure safety throughout the transit network. Transit security officers are authorized to arrest persons committing criminal offences on or in relation to any TransLink property, under the Canadian Criminal Code. They are also authorized to enforce the Transit Conduct and Safety Regulations and the Transit Tariff Bylaw. The Transit Security department is also responsible for the CCTV camera system aboard buses.

On November 14, 2006, the Canadian government announced that it would spend $37 million for improvements to transit security across Canada, including $9.8 million for the Vancouver area. CCTV cameras have been installed on all TransLink buses newer than 2006, except for Community Shuttle units.

=== Transit police ===
TransLink replaced its special provincial constables, who held limited policing power, with the Metro Vancouver Transit Police in December 2005. In contrast to the former TransLink special constables, transit police constables have full police powers both on and off of TransLink property. They are based in New Westminster, BC.

== Branding ==
Shortly after its inception, TransLink's board of directors approved replacement of the old BC Transit colours with TransLink's new blue and yellow colour scheme, or livery. It also created brands for the agency's different services, each with a different logo based on these colours, with the exception of the West Coast Express. The board decided against changing West Coast Express's purple colour to blue, since purple and yellow create a premium brand differentiable from TransLink's blue and yellow livery. Repainting of vehicles did not incur any additional costs, as it was completed during regular maintenance repaints or new vehicle purchases. At the time of approval, TransLink estimated that it would take until the end of 2007 to convert the entire fleet to the new livery.

In 2001, TransLink introduced a new set of long-distance buses under the ExpressBus brand with its own livery. In 2018, TransLink began to replace these buses and the ExpressBus livery was abandoned for a revised version of the new corporate livery introduced in 2005.

In 2003, TransLink placed an order for 228 new trolley buses which began to arrive in 2005. These buses featured a new livery composed of yellow, blue, and two shades of grey, which was then adopted as a permanent corporate livery. This new livery was later added to older SeaBus vessels and SkyTrain rolling stock in an attempt to unify the fleet.

In January 2020, TransLink converted most of its B-Line service into a new service called RapidBus, whose vehicles sported a new livery. The RapidBus livery is a variation of the standard TransLink livery but features a green-and-blue colour scheme.

== Infrastructure and planning services ==
TransLink maintains some pieces of infrastructure in the region, in addition to its core public transit services.

=== Major Road Network ===
TransLink works with municipalities within the region to plan and maintain the region's Major Road Network (MRN). The MRN consists of major arterial roads throughout the region which carry commuter, transit, and truck traffic. The 675-kilometre-long (419 mi) network serves to connect the provincial highway system with local municipalities' road networks. TransLink contributes funding for the operation and maintenance of the MRN, but ownership and operation of the roads remain with the local municipalities. Road, cycling, and pedestrian improvement projects in the MRN are also partially funded by TransLink. As a part of the MRN, TransLink also owns and maintains four bridges within the region:

- Canada Line bike and pedestrian bridge
- Golden Ears Bridge
- Knight Street Bridge
- Westham Island Bridge

In December 2018, 236 lane-kilometres (147 lane-mi) of roadway was added to the MRN. This was the largest one-time addition to the MRN since the arterial roadway network designation was created in 1998.

=== Transit-related improvements ===
TransLink allocates funding to each municipality for transit improvements, such as transit priority signals, queue-jumping lanes for buses, and bus lanes. TransLink contributes up to half of the costs of municipal capital projects, up to the maximum funding allocated to each municipality.

=== Cycling ===
TransLink employs several engineers and planners who administer its bicycle program. TransLink works with many cycling stakeholders, such as the Vancouver Area Cycling Coalition.

TransLink invests $6 million in cycling each year (as of 2007). This money is spread among capital and operating projects, with some allocated to cost-sharing programs, which result in additional investment in cycling.

Metro Vancouver has a growing network of cycling paths. TransLink allocates funding to each municipality for cycling improvements, such as bike paths, through a cost-sharing program called the Bicycle Infrastructure Capital Cost Sharing Program. TransLink contributes up to half of the costs of municipal capital projects, up to the maximum funding allocated to each municipality. Municipalities are eligible to apply for a share of the available funding each year. Most of the funding is allocated this way, while some funding is available in a competitive process called Regional Needs. The funding process is overseen by the Bicycle Working Group, composed of municipal cycling staff.

TransLink also produces a regional cycling map, which is available for sale or as a free PDF file downloadable from its website. Many municipalities also produce their own local cycling maps.

TransLink supports many cycling-related community initiatives and events, particularly Bike Month, held every June.

All modes of transit in Metro Vancouver carry bicycles. Most buses operated by TransLink have bike racks, supplied by SportWorks. Bikes are allowed on SeaBus. Bikes are also allowed on SkyTrain, except during weekday rush hours in the peak direction of travel (inbound to Vancouver in the morning rush hour and outbound from Vancouver in the evening rush hour).

TransLink installs and maintains bicycle parking racks and lockers at SkyTrain stations and transit interchanges through private contractors.

In 2022, TransLink launched a "Bike Bus" pilot project, establishing an additional bus line between Bridgeport station and Tsawwassen ferry terminal. The route runs along the existing 620 route and uses retrofitted buses with 7 interior bike racks for a total capacity of 9 bikes and 17 passengers. In 2023, the route was reinstated, running Friday to Sunday from June 30 to September 3.

=== Emission control ===
AirCare was a regionally mandated automobile emissions program operated by a subsidiary of TransLink. The program was discontinued on December 31, 2014.

== Accessibility ==
All vehicles, stations, and facilities are fully accessible; however, several issues exist on parts of the system, notably wheelchair accessibility in some areas. Improvements have been made, and accessibility issues became particularly important with the hosting of the Paralympic Winter Games in 2010. Because of this, TransLink initiated the Access Transit Project, whose final report was completed in June 2007.

=== Buses ===
All buses in the TransLink fleet are accessible, with most being low-floor vehicles that have ramps, although some are high-floor vehicles that have specially designed lifts. However, some stops are considered inaccessible if there is insufficient room to deploy the lifts or ramps.

There is space for two wheelchairs on each bus, and the wheelchair area is also used for walkers and baby strollers. Passengers using wheelchairs have priority for these positions, and lower-priority users (such as those with strollers) are required to vacate the space as needed.

In August 2006, TransLink began replacing its entire fleet of inaccessible electric trolley buses with 188 standard 12.2-metre (40 ft) low-floor accessible trolley buses. In 2008 and 2009, it purchased 74 new articulated 18.3-metre (60 ft) low-floor accessible trolley buses, which are used on routes #3 (Main), #8 (Fraser), #10 (Granville), and #20 (Victoria). By the end of 2009, the entire fleet of trolley buses was low-floor and accessible.

In late 2008, TransLink introduced voice announcement systems on most buses to help those with vision impairments or unfamiliar with the region and to allow operators to focus on driving instead of making announcements. The annunciators use a computer-generated voice to call out bus stops and other messages, using GPS technology installed on each bus to identify the bus's location and the next stop. There were a few problems with the system, however, such as audio quality and volume levels.

=== SkyTrain ===
All of the SkyTrain network, including stations and vehicles, is accessible. Older Bombardier Mark I cars have one wheelchair-designated spot, while the Bombardier Mark II and Mark III cars, along with the Hyundai Rotem cars, have two.

Some newer accessibility features introduced include Bombardier Mark II and Mark III cars with door indicator lights and LED route maps.

=== SeaBus ===
All SeaBus vessels and both Lonsdale Quay and Waterfront station are accessible.

=== West Coast Express ===
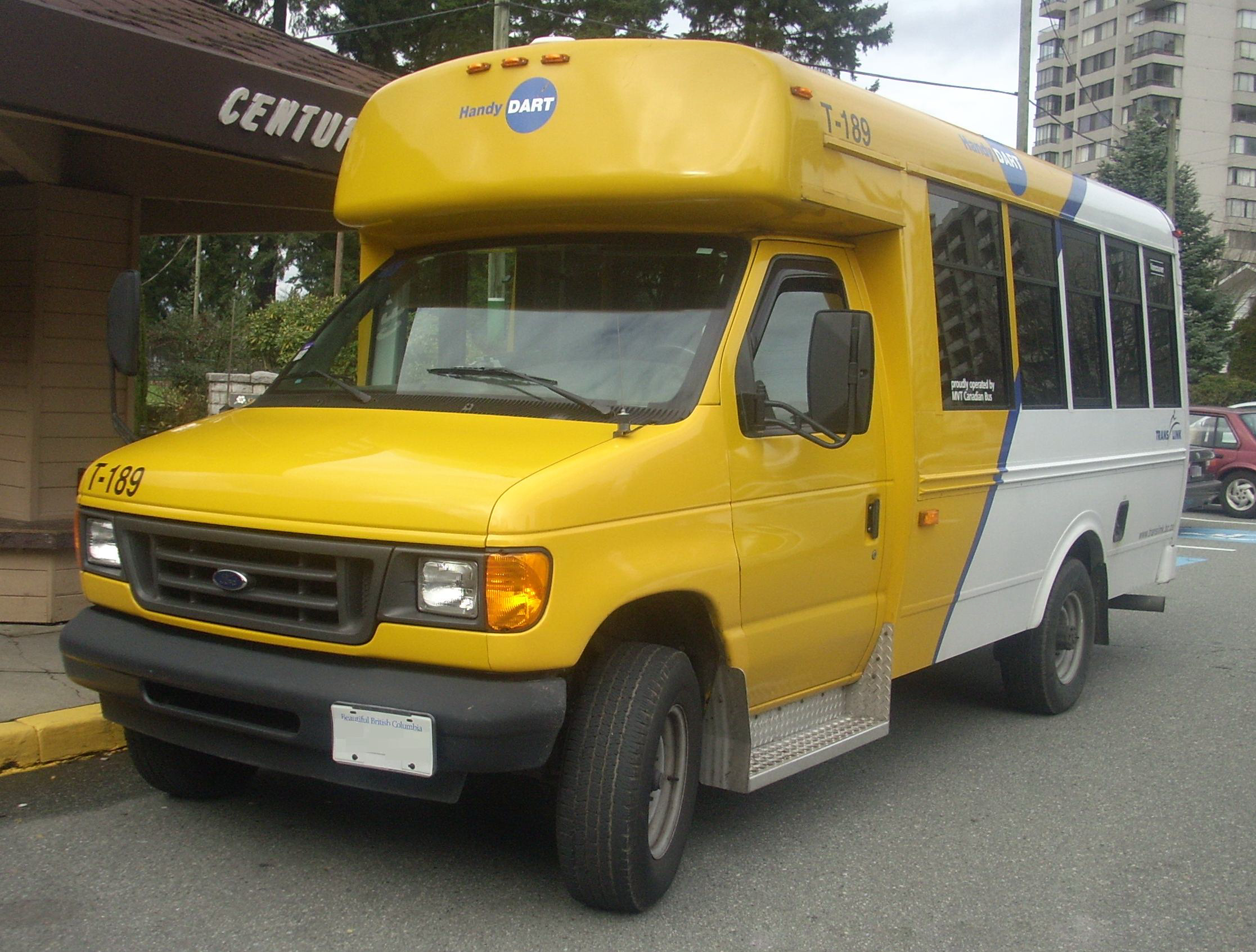
A Ford E-Series HandyDART cutaway bus during the Vancouver 2010 Winter Olympics

All West Coast Express trains and stations are accessible. Ramps are provided at stations for boarding, and trains have two wheelchair spaces on most cars, and an accessible washroom.

=== HandyDART ===
HandyDART is a supplementary system that provides transportation service to those who are unable to use the regular system due to mobility problems or a lack of accessible transit. HandyDART service is operated by seven different contractors throughout Metro Vancouver, most of which are not-for-profit corporations. Dispatch, reservations, and trip deliveries are handled by Transdev, having acquired the previous operator, First Transit, in 2023.

HandyDART users apply for a pass and pay for each trip. Each trip must be pre-booked, up to one week in advance, and is subject to availability at the desired time. Each contractor operates regionally, meaning that it is not always possible to use HandyDART for an entire trip (for example, from Burnaby to Vancouver). If there is no HandyDART vehicle available for a trip, a taxi is provided instead. Taxis are used for 17 percent of trips, which has sparked concerns among riders and advocates.

== Governance ==
=== Mayors' Council ===
The Mayors' Council is composed of the 21 mayors of Metro Vancouver municipalities and the Chief of Tsawwassen First Nation, who represent the interests of citizens of the region. It approves plans prepared by TransLink, including transportation plans, regional funding, and borrowing limits. Each year, the Mayors' Council appoints three new directors to TransLink's board of directors from a shortlist of candidates prepared by the screening panel.

=== Screening panel ===
Under the terms of provincial legislation, each year the screening panel prepares a shortlist of candidates for TransLink's board of directors. The shortlist must consist of at least five candidates for the three available positions on the board of directors. The screening panel is composed of five members. Each of the following organizations must appoint one person to the Screening Panel:

- Vancouver Board of Trade
- Chartered Accountants of BC
- Greater Vancouver Gateway Council
- British Columbia's Minister of Transportation and Infrastructure
- Mayors' Council

=== Board of directors and chief executive officer ===
The board is responsible for hiring, compensating, and monitoring the performance of the CEO and for providing oversight of TransLink's strategic planning, finances, major capital projects, and operations. While the board conducts four public meetings a year, most of its deliberations are conducted in closed meetings.

Board members are appointed to serve a three-year term and can be reappointed for a second term. Most have extensive ties to private businesses.

List of TransLink Board of Directors chairs
Chair	Period	Ref.
George Puil	April 1999 – December 2001	
Doug McCallum	January 2002 – December 2005	
Malcolm Brodie	January 2006 – December 2007	
Dale Parker	January 2008 – December 2010	
Nancy Olewiler	January 2011 – December 2013	
Marcella Szel	January 2014 – August 2015	
Barry Forbes	August 2015 – December 2015	
Dan Rose	January 2016 – December 2016	
Lorraine Cunningham	January 2017 – December 2018	
Tony Gugliotta	January 2019 – December 2019	
Lorraine Cunningham	January 2020 – present	

List of TransLink CEOs
CEO	Period	Ref.
Ken Dobell	April 1999 – January 2001	
Pat Jacobsen	April 2001 – early 2008	
Tom Prendergast	July 2008 – November 2009	
Ian Jarvis	November 2009 – February 2015	
Kevin Desmond	March 2016 – February 2021	
Gigi Chen-Kuo (interim)	February 2021 – July 19, 2021	
Kevin B. Quinn	July 19, 2021 – present	

=== Regional transportation commissioner ===
Provincial legislation passed in June 2014 dissolved the position of the regional transportation commissioner. Prior to this time, the regional transportation commissioner approved all cash fare increases greater than the rate of inflation. The commissioner also approved TransLink's plans for annual customer satisfaction surveys, its customer complaint process, and any proposed sale of major assets. The regional transportation commissioner operated separately from the Mayors' Council, the TransLink board of directors, and TransLink staff.

=== Criticism of governance model ===
In 2013, a report commissioned by the Mayors' Council criticized TransLink's governance model, stating that TransLink lacked "accountability to the population being served, which is almost completely missing from the present arrangements". The report also stated that the absence of mechanisms to "ensure accountability, effectiveness, and efficiency" made TransLink's governance "unique in the world and not in a good way".

== See also ==
- Albion Ferry – former free automobile ferry service between Langley Township and Maple Ridge across the Fraser River
