= Matfallu =

- Village
- Location in Punjab, India Matfallu (India)
- Coordinates: 31.1490677°N 75.8573503°E
- Country: India
- State: Punjab
- District: Jalandhar

Government
  - Type: Panchayat raj
  - Body: Gram panchayat
- Elevation: 240 m (790 ft)

Population (2011)
  - Total: 784
- Sex ratio 400/384 ♂/♀

Languages
  - Official: Punjabi
- Time zone: UTC+5:30 (IST)
- PIN: 144502
- Telephone: 01826
- ISO 3166 code: IN-PB
- Vehicle registration: PB- 08
- Post office: Dosanjh Kalan
- Website: jalandhar.nic.in

Matfallu also spelled as Matfalu, is a village in Jalandhar district of Punjab State, India. It is located 5.8 km away from postal head office in Dosanjh Kalan, 20.6 km from Phillaur, 40 km from district headquarter Jalandhar and 127 km from state capital Chandigarh. The village is administrated by a sarpanch, who is an elected representative.

== Education ==
The village has a Punjabi medium, co-ed primary school (PRI Matfallu). The school provide mid-day meal as per Indian Midday Meal Scheme and the meal prepared in school premises.

== Demography ==
According to the report published by Census India in 2011, Matfallu has a total number of 164 houses and population of 784 of which include 400 males and 384 females. Literacy rate of Matfallu is 81.43%, higher than state average of 75.84%. The population of children under the age of 6 years is 84 which is 10.71% of total population of Matfallu, and child sex ratio is approximately 556 lower than state average of 846.

Most of the people are from Schedule Caste which constitutes 70.28% of total population in Matfallu. The town does not have any Schedule Tribe population so far.

As per census 2011, 224 people were engaged in work activities out of the total population of Matfallu which includes 199 males and 25 females. According to census survey report 2011, 82.14% workers describe their work as main work and 17.86% workers are involved in marginal activity providing livelihood for less than 6 months.

== Transport ==
Goraya railway station is the nearest train station; however, Phagwara Junction train station is 15.5 km away from the village. The village is 53.4 km away from domestic airport in Ludhiana and the nearest international airport is located in Chandigarh also Sri Guru Ram Dass Jee International Airport is the second nearest airport which is 131 km away in Amritsar.
