= Patrick Wong =

Canadian politician

- 黃耀華

Member of the British Columbia Legislative Assembly for Vancouver-Kensington
- In office May 16, 2001 – May 17, 2005
- Preceded by: Ujjal Dosanjh
- Succeeded by: David Chudnovsky

Personal details
- Born: May 13, 1947 (age 79) British Hong Kong
- Party: British Columbia Liberal Party
- Spouse: Jenny Chow (m. 1978)
- Education: Simon Fraser University (B.B.A)
- Occupation: Politician
- Profession: Accountant

Patrick Wong (Chinese: 黃耀華; born May 13, 1947) is a Canadian accountant and a former politician. He served as a member of the Legislative Assembly of British Columbia from 2001 through 2005, representing the riding of Vancouver-Kensington. He served as the Minister of State for Immigration and Multicultural Services from September 2004 to June 2005. He is a member of the British Columbia Liberal Party.

== Life and career ==
A native of Hong Kong, Wong is a chartered accountant and worked at the Hongkong & Shanghai Banking Corporation, Hong Kong Housing Authority and a local stock brokerage firm before moving to Canada. He attended Simon Fraser University, where he earned a B.B.A. from Simon Fraser University's Beedie School of Business in 1978. He obtained his chartered accountant designation in British Columbia in 1982, and worked as a tax auditor for Revenue Canada until co-founding an accounting firm specializing in tax and business consulting services in 1983. He served as a commissioner for the Fraser River Port Authority, and became its chair in 1999.

In the 2001 provincial election, he ran for the BC Liberals against incumbent premier and British Columbia New Democratic Party (BC NDP) leader Ujjal Dosanjh in the riding of Vancouver-Kensington. With the BC NDP far behind in the polls, Wong unseated Dosanjh by 1,684 votes. In his only term in the BC legislature, he served in the Legislative Select Standing Committees on Crown Corporations and Public Accounts, and the Government Caucus Committee on Education. He was also named Minister of State for Immigration and Multicultural Services on September 20, 2004.

Wong ran for re-election in the 2005 provincial election against NDP candidate David Chudnovsky. With the NDP regaining support, Wong lost to Chudnovsky by 1,624 votes, and returned to his accounting practice.

He is married with four children.
