= Mable Elmore =

Canadian politician

Mable Elmore MLA
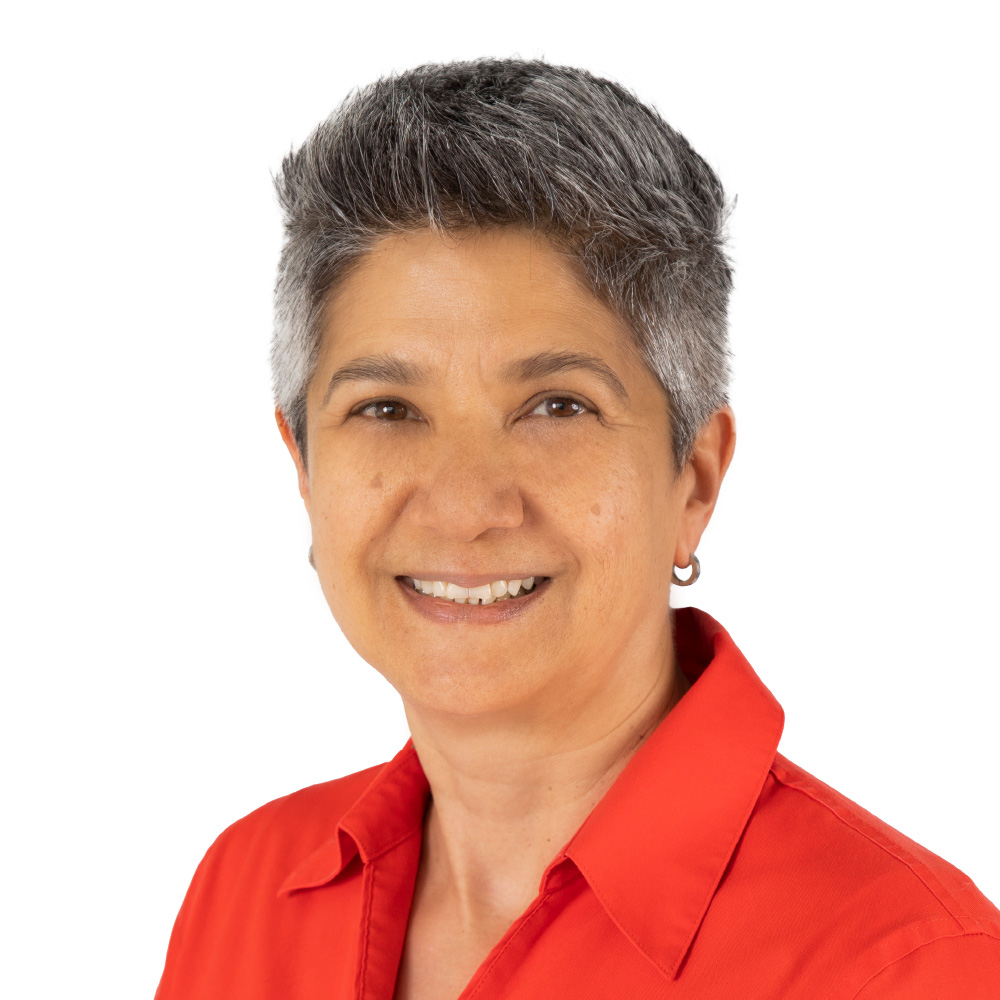
- Campaign portrait, 2024

Parliamentary Secretary for Anti-Racism Initiatives of British Columbia
- In office December 7, 2022 – November 18, 2024
- Premier: David Eby
- Preceded by: Rachna Singh
- Succeeded by: Jessie Sunner

Parliamentary Secretary for Seniors Services & Long Term Care of British Columbia
- In office November 26, 2020 – December 7, 2022
- Premier: John Horgan; David Eby
- Preceded by: Position Created
- Succeeded by: Harwinder Sandhu

Parliamentary Secretary for Poverty Reduction of British Columbia
- In office July 18, 2017 – November 26, 2020
- Premier: John Horgan
- Preceded by: Position Created
- Succeeded by: Position Abolished

Member of the British Columbia Legislative Assembly for Vancouver-Kensington
- Incumbent
- Assumed office May 12, 2009
- Preceded by: David Chudnovsky

Personal details
- Born: Langley, British Columbia
- Party: New Democrat
- Education: University of British Columbia
- Occupation: Politician

Mable Elmore is a Canadian politician who represents the Vancouver-Kensington electoral district in the Legislative Assembly of British Columbia. A member of the British Columbia New Democratic Party (BC NDP), she was first elected as a Member of the Legislative Assembly (MLA) in the 2009 provincial election. Currently the Parliamentary Secretary for Anti-Racism Initiatives, she previously served as the Parliamentary Secretary for Poverty Reduction (2017–2020) and Parliamentary Secretary for Seniors Services and Long Term Care (2020–2022).

Elmore is the first MLA of Filipino descent. Previously, she worked in Vancouver driving buses for the Coast Mountain Bus Company. She was active within Vancouver's Filipino Canadian community and within her union. Coming out of the University of British Columbia she volunteered and then worked at the BC Philippine Women Centre. Since her high school years, she had helped organize campaigns regarding social justice issues and the peace movement.

Elmore was a candidate for the New Democratic Party nomination in Vancouver East for the 2015 federal election, though Jenny Kwan won and went on to become the riding's Member of Parliament.

== Background ==
Elmore's mother immigrated to Canada from the Philippines in 1965 and met her father, an Irish Canadian manager at a pulp and paper mill, while in Prince Rupert, British Columbia. A couple of years later Mable was born in Langley. The family moved to Nova Scotia and they lived in Turkey for a brief time, but they spent most of Elmore's youth living in Manitoba. It was at her high school in Winnipeg, learning about South African apartheid, that she became politically aware and active. Following high school, she attended the University of British Columbia studying physical education and volunteered at the BC Philippine Women Centre, which turned into a full-time job.

Several years later, Elmore started working as a bus driver for the Coast Mountain Bus Company. She was a vocal advocate for social justice issues and worker rights. She was active with the Vancouver and District Labour Council, the BC Federation of Labour, and in her union, the CAW Local 111. She helped organize peace and anti-war marches in Vancouver.

== Politics ==
With the 2009 provincial election approaching, and incumbent New Democratic MLA David Chudnovsky retiring, Elmore put her name forward as a candidate for the NDP nomination in the Vancouver-Kensington riding. Due to an internal BC NDP rule requiring that the subsequent NDP candidate be female in ridings where there is a retiring male NDP MLA, only women could be nominated. Elmore's only challenger was former BC Teachers' Federation president Jinny Sims, whom Elmore defeated in the March 2009 nomination election. Within hours of her nomination, copies of a 2004 interview with Elmore published in an online magazine, called Seven Oaks, were distributed in which, in reference to her anti-war activism within a union environment, Elmore identified "vocal Zionists in our worksites" as a challenge. This was viewed as a disparaging remark and party leader Carole James asked Elmore to make a public apology.

The general election was held in May when Elmore ran against realtor and former radio host Syrus Lee for the BC Liberal Party and engineer Doug Warkentin for the BC Green Party. Elmore had the support of many in the Filipino Canadian community who helped campaign for her. Elmore's campaign manager helped thwart an attempt to circumvent election laws by the Kash Heed campaign, a BC Liberal candidate in a neighbouring riding, after she was informed of Heed's intent to mail, in the Vancouver-Kensington riding, anti-NDP pamphlets, which did not include the proper disclosure and documentation. Regardless, Elmore went on to win the general election with 53% of the vote, though her party lost to the BC Liberals who formed a majority government with the NDP as the official opposition. Elmore was the first Filipino Canadian to be elected as a Member of the BC Legislative Assembly, and only the second openly lesbian member, after Jenn McGinn.

As the 39th Parliament began, Elmore was assigned the role of deputy critic on the Ministry of Children and Family Development, with fellow NDP MLA Maurine Karagianis as the full-time critic. In this role, Elmore identified financial misstatements by Solicitor-General Kash Heed which forced Heed and the Premier to reverse a planned $440,000 cut to domestic violence programs. She was appointed to the Select Standing Committee on Children and Youth in all four sessions of the Parliament. She also serves as the vice-chair of the Select Standing Committee on Finance and Government Services in the third and fourth session. Elmore was part of an effort to defend party leader Carole James in 2010 when MLAs began to criticize the party leadership. Following James' resignation as leader, interim leader Dawn Black reassigned Elmore to be the opposition's multiculturalism critic, and in the April 2011 leadership election Elmore endorsed Adrian Dix. In July 2012, Dix reassigned her to be the Critic for the Insurance Corporation of British Columbia (ICBC) and Deputy Critic for Finance.

In the 2013 provincial election Elmore was challenged by Philippines-born Gabby Kalaw for the BC Liberals, research scientist Chris Fjell for the BC Greens, and realtor Raj Gupta for the BC Conservatives, but won with over 50% of the vote. With her party forming the Official Opposition in the 40th Parliament, she retained her critic roles focusing on ICBC and finance, even after John Horgan became party leader in the May 2014 leadership election. She was a vocal critic of the abuse of the temporary foreign worker program. In January 2017, Horgan reassigned her critic roles to formally focus on temporary foreign workers and immigration while keeping her as deputy critic on finance.

Following the announcement that Libby Davies would not seek re-election as the Member of Parliament in the 2015 federal election and would retire from the House of Commons of Canada after having served since 1997, the 45-year-old Elmore sought the New Democratic Party nomination in Vancouver East. She was challenged by her BC NDP colleague Jenny Kwan, the MLA for Vancouver-Mount Pleasant at the time, and in the nomination contest on March 22, 2015, Kwan was selected.

Elmore sought re-election in Vancouver-Kensington during the 2017 provincial election, in which she faced former senior advisor for the BC Ministry of Health Kim Chan Logan for the BC Liberals and Simon Rear for the BC Greens. She won her riding with over 50% of the vote but her party began the 41st Parliament as the official opposition to a BC Liberal minority government. After the BC Liberals lost a confidence vote and the BC NDP formed the minority government, the new premier, John Horgan, appointed Elmore to be the position of parliamentary secretary for poverty reduction under Social Development Minister Shane Simpson, as well as the deputy government caucus chairperson. She co-chaired an advisory committee on poverty reduction tasked with offering expertise and advice on how best to implement a Poverty Reduction Strategy and recommending priority actions and principles for that strategy.

After winning re-election in 2020, Elmore was reassigned as Parliamentary Secretary for Seniors Services and Long Term Care. She remained in that post until December 7, 2022, when new Premier David Eby named her Parliamentary Secretary for Anti-Racism Initiatives.

== Electoral history ==
2026 British Columbia general election: Vancouver-Kensington
The 2026 general election will be held on October 24.
Party	Candidate	Votes	%	±%	Expenditures
New Democratic	Mable Elmore				
Conservative	Aron Lageri				
Green	Adam Hawk				
Total valid votes					
Total rejected ballots					
Turnout					
Registered voters					
Source: Elections BC

2024 British Columbia general election: Vancouver-Kensington
Party	Candidate	Votes	%	±%	Expenditures
New Democratic	Mable Elmore	11,713	60.9%	+0.93	
Conservative	Syed Mohsin	6,061	31.5%		
Green	Amy Fox	1,458	7.6%	-6.21	
Total valid votes		19,232	–		
Total rejected ballots					
Turnout					
Registered voters					
Source: Elections BC

2020 British Columbia general election: Vancouver-Kensington
Party	Candidate	Votes	%	±%	Expenditures
New Democratic	Mable Elmore	12,481	59.97	+4.40	$6,860.33
Liberal	Paul Lepage	5,255	25.25	−6.91	$8,116.84
Green	Nazanin Moghadami	2,874	13.81	+2.34	$5,727.78
Independent	Salvatore Vetro	202	0.97	–	$5,942.50
Total valid votes		20,812	100.00	–	
Total rejected ballots		231	1.10	+0.09	
Turnout		21,043	50.89	−8.61	
Registered voters		41,346			
New Democratic hold		Swing		+5.66	
Source: Elections BC

2017 British Columbia general election: Vancouver-Kensington
Party	Candidate	Votes	%	±%	Expenditures
New Democratic	Mable Elmore	12,503	55.57	+4.20	$35,037
Liberal	Kim Jee Chan Logan	7,236	32.16	−6.13	$64,066
Green	Simon Alexander Rear	2,580	11.47	+3.88	$1,518
Your Political Party	Ramanjit Kaur Dhillon	181	0.80	–	$1,341
Total valid votes		22,500	100.00	–	
Total rejected ballots		229	1.01	−0.20	
Turnout		22,729	59.50	+5.17	
Registered voters		38,199			
Source: Elections BC

2013 British Columbia general election: Vancouver-Kensington
Party	Candidate	Votes	%	±%	Expenditures
New Democratic	Mable Elmore	10,687	51.37	−1.18	$64,956
Liberal	Gabby Kalaw	7,965	38.29	−2.34	$63,669
Green	Chris Fjell	1,578	7.59	+0.77	$2,530
Conservative	Raj Gupta	572	2.75	–	$6,467
Total valid votes		20,802	100.00		
Total rejected ballots		254	1.21		
Turnout		21,056	54.33		
Source: Elections BC

2009 British Columbia general election: Vancouver-Kensington
Party	Candidate	Votes	%	Expenditures
New Democratic	Mable Elmore	9,930	52.55	$85,850
Liberal	Syrus Lee	7,678	40.63	$39,514
Green	Doug Warkentin	1,288	6.82	$780
Total valid votes		18,896	100	
Total rejected ballots		210	1.1	
Turnout		19,106	51.98	
