= Kevin B. Quinn =

CEO of TransLink (British Columbia)

Kevin B. Quinn, Jr. AICP
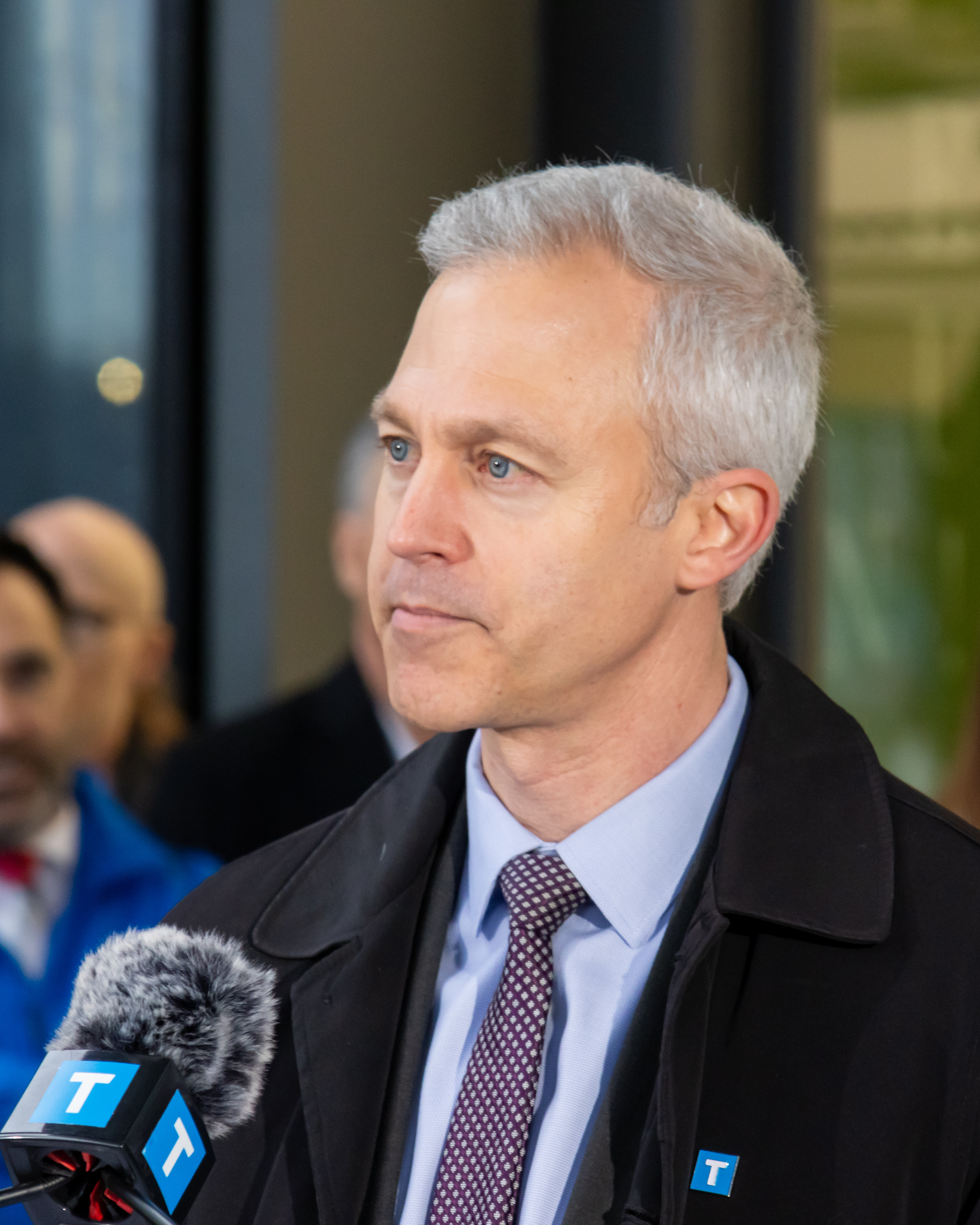
- Quinn in 2024
- Born: 1979 or 1980 (age 46–47)
- Education: Goucher College (BA); Johns Hopkins University (MPP)
- Occupation: CEO of TransLink (2021–incumbent)
- Employer: TransLink (British Columbia)
- Predecessor: Gigi Chen-Kuo (interim)
- Spouse: Angie
- Children: 2

Kevin B. Quinn (born 1979 or 1980) is the chief executive officer of TransLink. Prior to his current role, he was CEO and administrator of the Maryland Transit Administration from 2017 to 2021.

== Education ==
Quinn graduated from Goucher College with a bachelor's degree in Political Science and Government in 2001. He then earned a Master of Public Policy from Johns Hopkins University. Since 2007, Quinn is a member of the American Institute of Certified Planners.

== Career ==
=== Early career ===
Quinn worked as the Mid-Atlantic Regional Planning Manager for the STV Group of Baltimore where he was focused on transportation planning. In the aftermath of Hurricane Sandy, Quinn oversaw the development of grants winning $1.5 billion for infrastructure repair New York City Transit Resiliency and Recovery Grants.

=== Maryland Transit Administration ===
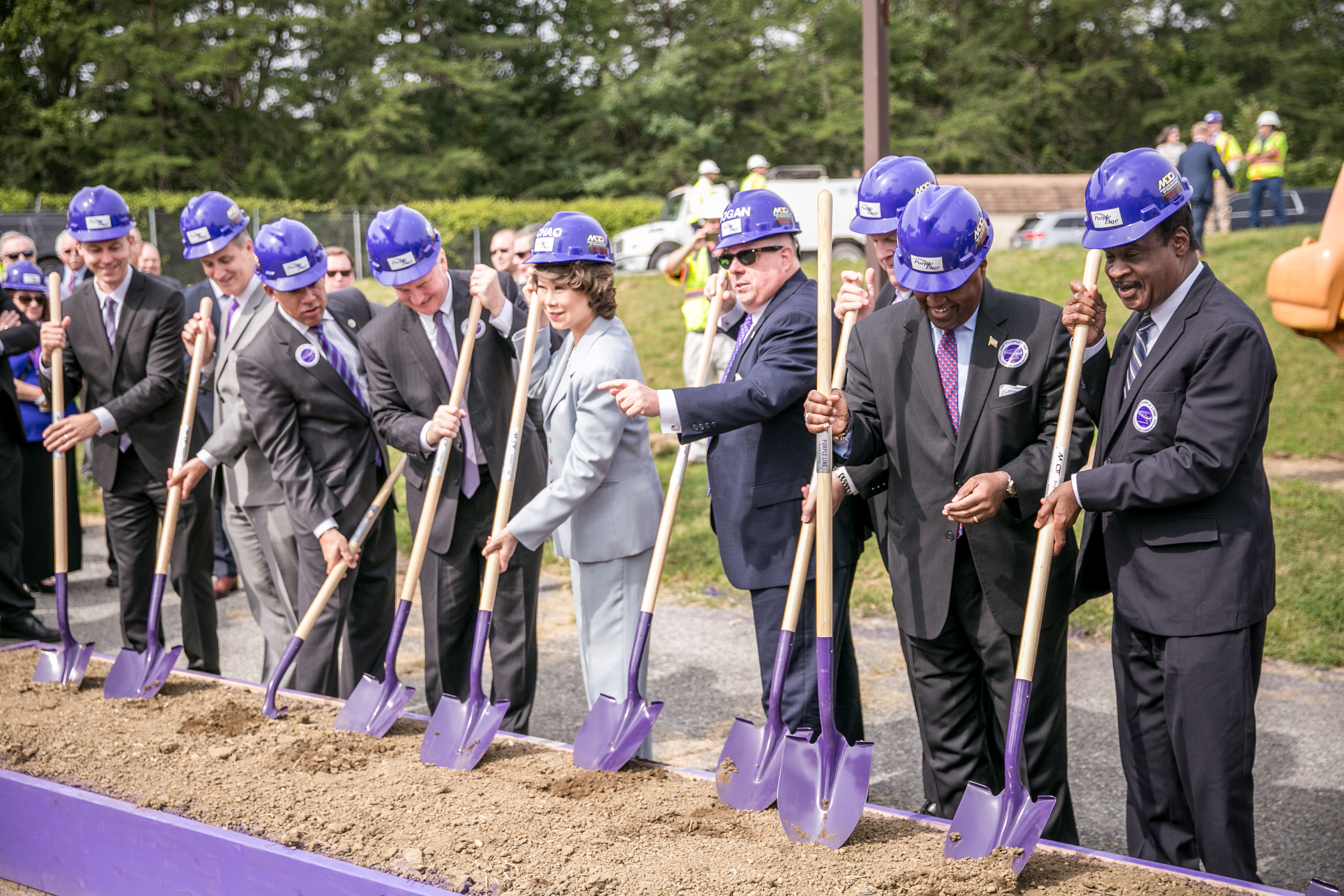
Quinn (far left) at the groundbreaking ceremony of the Purple Line on August 28, 2017.

Quinn joined the Maryland Transit Administration (MTA) in 2014 as the BaltimoreLink Implementation Manager. In this capacity, Quinn directed the divisions of Project Development, Environmental Planning and Capital Programming and managed Governor Hogan's $135 million rebranding and design of the Baltimore regional bus system. Immediately prior to his appointment, Quinn was the Director of Planning and Programming. In this role, Quinn oversaw the $3.6 billion capital program and managed grant coordination with the Federal Transit Administration.

Quinn was recognized as one of Mass Transit Magazine's 2016 Top 40 under 40 in transportation for innovation and leadership.

In June 2017, Quinn succeed Paul Comfort as the CEO and Administrator of the MTA. On his appointment, Governor Larry Hogan stated "Kevin is a smart transportation professional who has proven time and time again he knows how to make great things happen for the customers he serves, the State of Maryland will truly benefit from this transit expertise and his ability to turn ideas into real-world solutions."

=== TransLink ===
In 2021, Quinn was hired as CEO of TransLink in Metro Vancouver, succeeding interim CEO Gigi Chen-Kuo in July of that year.

== Personal life ==
Quinn lives in the Metro Vancouver Regional District with his wife Angie and two children Iris and Jack.

Preceded by Gigi Chen-Kuo	Chief Executive Officer; TransLink (British Columbia); 2021	Succeeded by Incumbent
