= Ujjal Dosanjh =

Canadian politician (born 1947)

The Honourable Ujjal Dev Dosanjh PC KC
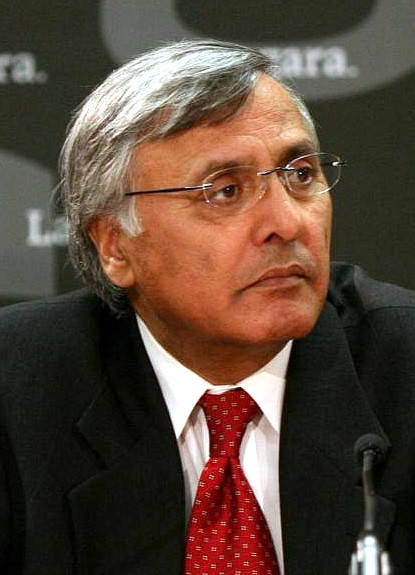
- Dosanjh in 2011

33rd Premier of British Columbia
- In office February 24, 2000 – June 5, 2001
- Monarch: Elizabeth II
- Lieutenant Governor: Garde Gardom
- Deputy: Joy MacPhail
- Preceded by: Dan Miller
- Succeeded by: Gordon Campbell

Member of Parliament for Vancouver South
- In office June 28, 2004 – May 2, 2011
- Preceded by: Herb Dhaliwal
- Succeeded by: Wai Young

Minister of Health
- In office July 20, 2004 – February 5, 2006
- Prime Minister: Paul Martin
- Preceded by: Pierre Pettigrew
- Succeeded by: Tony Clement

Leader of the British Columbia New Democratic Party
- In office February 24, 2000 – May 16, 2001
- Preceded by: Dan Miller (interim)
- Succeeded by: Joy MacPhail (interim)

Member of the British Columbia Legislative Assembly for Vancouver-Kensington
- In office October 17, 1991 – May 16, 2001
- Preceded by: Riding Established
- Succeeded by: Patrick Wong

Attorney General of British Columbia
- In office August 16, 1995 – February 29, 2000
- Premier: Mike Harcourt; Glen Clark; Dan Miller
- Preceded by: Colin Gabelmann
- Succeeded by: Andrew Petter

Minister responsible for multiculturalism and Human Rights
- In office May 10, 1995 – February 29, 2000
- Premier: Mike Harcourt; Glen Clark; Dan Miller
- Preceded by: Moe Sihota
- Succeeded by: Sue Hammell

Minister of Government Services
- In office April 10, 1995 – August 16, 1995
- Premier: Mike Harcourt
- Preceded by: Arthur Charbonneau
- Succeeded by: Colin Gabelmann

Minister responsible for sports
- In office April 10, 1995 – August 16, 1995
- Premier: Mike Harcourt
- Preceded by: Arthur Charbonneau
- Succeeded by: Colin Gabelmann

Personal details
- Born: September 9, 1947 (age 79) Dosanjh Kalan, East Punjab, India
- Party: Liberal Party of Canada (2004–present)
- Other political affiliations: British Columbia New Democratic Party; New Democratic Party of Canada (1979–2002)
- Spouse: Raminder Dosanjh
- Education: Simon Fraser University; University of British Columbia; Langara College
- Profession: Lawyer

Ujjal Dev Dosanjh (/ˈuːdʒəl doʊˈsɑːndʒ/; born September 9, 1947) is a Canadian lawyer and politician. He served as the 33rd premier of British Columbia from 2000 to 2001 and as a Liberal Party of Canada member of Parliament from 2004 to 2011. He was minister of health from 2004 until 2006, when the party lost government. He then served in the Official Opposition from January 2006 until 2011. Dosanjh was one of four visible minorities to serve in Paul Martin's Ministry.

Prior to being involved in federal politics, he spent ten years in provincial politics. He was elected in the Vancouver-Kensington riding in 1991 as a member of the British Columbia New Democratic Party (BC NDP) and was re-elected there in 1996. He served as the Attorney General of British Columbia from August 1995 to February 2000. When the leader of his party resigned in 1999, Dosanjh put himself forward as a candidate and won the leadership vote. With the win, he became Canada's first Indo-Canadian provincial leader. He served as the 33rd Premier of British Columbia until June 2001 when he lost the province's general election. He was the last NDP premier of the province until John Horgan was elevated to the position in 2017.

Born in a village in the Jalandhar district of Punjab, India, Dosanjh emigrated to the United Kingdom at the age of 17 before moving to Canada almost four years later. He worked numerous manual labour jobs and attended university, studying political science. He earned his law degree at the University of British Columbia and opened his own law firm. He has been a vocal opponent of violence and extremism.

== Early life and career ==
Ujjal Dosanjh was born in Dosanjh Kalan, a village in Jalandhar, India, in 1947 shortly after the end of British rule in India.

After moving to another village, he lived with his grandfather, Moola Singh Bains, who had established a primary school. Dosanjh gained an early interest in politics from listening to debates between his father, a follower of Jawaharlal Nehru and Indian National Congress, and his grandfather, a former British Raj freedom fighter and socialist.

Dosanjh wanted to pursue an education in political science, but his father wanted him to be a doctor. In 1964, at the age of 17, Dosanjh left India for the United Kingdom where he could pursue his own interests. In London he learned English and worked as an assistant editor for a Punjabi-language newspaper. He emigrated to Canada three and a half years later, arriving in British Columbia on May 12, 1968, to live with his aunt. He completed his Bachelor of Arts degree in political science. He went on to earn a law degree from the University of British Columbia Faculty of Law in 1976, and was called to the bar the following year. During this time he taught English as a second language courses at Vancouver Community College and worked as an assistant editor of a local Punjabi newspaper. He established his own law practice in 1979, specializing in family and personal injury law. His involvement with community organizations included founding the Farm Workers' Legal Information Service (later Canadian Farm Workers' Union), serving on the board of directors for BC Civil Liberties Association and the Vancouver Multicultural Society, and the Labour Advocacy Research Association, as well as volunteer work with MOSAIC Immigrant Services Centre, and the South Vancouver Neighbourhood House.

A prominent moderate Sikh in Vancouver, Dosanjh spoke out against violence by Sikh extremists who advocated Khalistani independence from India. As a result of these views, in February 1985 he was attacked in the parking lot of his law office by an assailant wielding an iron bar. Dosanjh, 37 at the time, suffered a broken hand and received 80 stitches in his head.

He was targeted again, on 26 December 1999, while he was a member of the Legislative Assembly of British Columbia, when his constituency office was broken into and a Molotov cocktail left burning on a table.

Dosanjh and his wife Raminder have three sons. In April 2000, his middle son, Aseem, was charged with assaulting an Ontario police officer during a bar brawl, but was found not guilty. Dosanjh has travelled back to India several times, on official state business and for personal reasons, since emigrating. In January 2003, he was awarded the Pravasi Bharatiya Samman (Expatriate Indian Honour) from Indian Prime Minister Atal Bihari Vajpayee in New Delhi. The award recognises individual excellence in various fields for persons of Indian origin across the world.

In 2014, author Doug Welbanks published a biography, Unbreakable: The Ujjal Dosanjh Story.

== Provincial politics ==
Dosanjh ran as the British Columbia New Democratic Party candidate in the Vancouver South riding in the 1979 and 1983 provincial elections. He lost both times to the BC Social Credit Party candidates. He ran in the 1991 provincial election in the Vancouver-Kensington riding where he won as his party came to power. He would be re-elected in that same riding in the 1996 provincial election. He spent his first few years as a Member of the Legislative Assembly as a backbencher. In 1993, he chaired the Select Standing Committee on Parliamentary Reform, Ethical Conduct, Standing Orders and Private Bills. He served two years as caucus chair for his party until April 10, 1995, when Premier Mike Harcourt dismissed Robin Blencoe from his cabinet and replaced him with Dosanjh as Minister of Government Services and Minister Responsible for Sports. A month later, in a small cabinet shuffle upon the resignation of Moe Sihota, Harcourt added Minister Responsible for Multiculturalism and Human Rights to Dosanjh's portfolio. In another cabinet shuffle, as Sihota was re-instated into the cabinet in August, Dosanjh's portfolio was changed to Minister Responsible for Multiculturalism, Human Rights and Immigration and he was appointed Attorney General.

As Attorney General, Dosanjh oversaw the resolution of the Gustafsen Lake Standoff involving the Secwepemc Nation, set up a database for registering violent offenders, established a hate crime division in the Royal Canadian Mounted Police, and lobbied for more police officers, probation officers, and judiciary. At the same time his office drew criticism for reducing legal aid and closing courthouses. As the Minister Responsible for Multiculturalism, Human Rights and Immigration he successfully lobbied for laws giving same-sex couples the equal rights and responsibilities for child support, custody and access. In early 1999, a special prosecutor under the RCMP opened an investigation into possible influence peddling by Premier Glen Clark concerning casino licensing. On March 4, after the Royal Canadian Mounted Police (RCMP) raided the Premier's house, they briefed Attorney General Dosanjh, whose office had to assist, and placed him under a gag order. The order was lifted on August 13, he informed Clark, and called a press conference, after which Clark resigned as Premier. Dosanjh's actions were variously criticized for not informing his party caucus and not going public sooner, and applauded for avoiding perceptions of conflict of interest despite his power to intervene.

== Premier of British Columbia ==
The leadership convention to replace Clark was set for February 20, 2000. Dosanjh was among the front runners, along with Corky Evans, Gordon Wilson, and Joy MacPhail who all had served at various cabinet posts. Clark, Wilson and fellow MLA Moe Sihota campaigned specifically against Dosanjh. MacPhail dropped out and endorsed Dosanjh followed by Wilson dropping out and endorsing Evans. Dosanjh was successful and became Premier on February 24, 2000, Canada's first Indo-Canadian provincial leader.

As Premier for two and a half sessions of the 36th Parliament, between February 24, 2000 and June 5, 2001, Dosanjh gave priority to issues of health care, education, and balanced budgets. A boost in government revenue from rapidly expanding oil and gas development, led Dosanjh to direct the Finance Minister to draft balanced budget legislation. With the previous year's budget unexpectedly in surplus and increased revenue expected to continue, Dosanjh was able to keep the provincial budget in surplus while increasing spending by 8% in the 2001 budget year. The increased spending was mostly directed to renovations of hospital, public schools and higher education institutions, as well as building cancer treatment centers, lowering post-secondary tuition fees, and creating significantly more new spaces in the province's apprenticeship program and post-secondary institutions. Dosanjh became the first provincial leader to march in a gay pride parade and the provincial government adopted the Definition of Spouse Amendment Act which extended equal rights to same-sex couples. With Dosanjh as Premier the Legislative Assembly adopted the Tobacco Damages and Health Care Recovery Act, which permitted lawsuits against tobacco organizations to re-coup associated health care expenses, the Sex Offender Registry Act, and the Protection of Public Participation Act which prevented lawsuits against citizens who participated in public processes.

However, the BC NDP were deeply unpopular within the province, reaching a low at 15% support in opinion polls at the time of Glen Clark's resignation as Premier in August 1999. With Dosanjh as leader, support had risen to 21% by August 2000. Dosanjh was consistently ranked higher personal popularity over opposition leader Gordon Campbell until the run-up to the May 16, 2001 provincial election. Dosanjh and the BC NDP knew they would not be reelected, so they concentrated their campaign to a few ridings in the Lower Mainland which were still considered competitive. Their campaign focused on the expanding economy, issues of health care and education, and Dosanjh's personal popularity over Campbell. Dosanjh conceded defeat a week before the election, but requested voters consider making the NDP a strong opposition party. After the vote on May 16, Dosanjh lost his seat in Vancouver-Kensington along with all but two members of his Cabinet in the second-worst defeat of a sitting provincial government in Canada. The BC Liberals won all 77 other seats.

== Federal politics ==
Following the election loss Dosanjh returned to practicing law and let his party membership lapse. There had been speculation dating back to October 2002 that Dosanjh was interested in joining the Liberal Party of Canada. New Democratic Party leader Jack Layton approached Dosanjh in 2003 to see if he was interested in running as a federal candidate but Dosanjh refused. In March 2004, with a federal election expected in the spring or summer, Prime Minister Paul Martin approached Dosanjh to be a candidate for the Liberal Party of Canada. Dosanjh agreed and Martin appointed him to Vancouver South over two other nomination candidates while announcing Dosanjh as part of a team of BC star candidates along with economist David Emerson, union leader Dave Haggard, community activist Shirley Chan and Liberal party organizer Bill Cunningham. The advertising of Dosanjh emphasized the party's socially progressive aspect. In the June election Dosanjh won his riding with 44.5% of the vote.

=== 38th Canadian Parliament ===
In the 38th Canadian Parliament, Dosanjh was appointed Minister of Health in the federal Cabinet. As Health Minister, Dosanjh strongly supported Canada's existing single-tier, publicly funded health-care system. Dosanjh introduced legislation to make cigarettes fire safe, new regulations to further limit lead content in children's jewelry, and supported an NDP motion to ban trans fats. He advocated that Canada ratify the World Health Organization Framework Convention on Tobacco Control, which they did in November 2004. Dosanjh funded a program to revise the Canada food guide to include more multicultural foods and another program to integrate foreign-trained medical professionals into the health-care system. Supported by a unanimous vote in the House of Commons, the government agreed to compensate the 6,000 Canadians infected with hepatitis C from tainted blood transfusion.

Along with Prime Minister Martin, a 10-year, $41 billion funding plan was negotiated with the provinces to deliver health care – with $5.5 billion to specifically address wait times that had been an election issue during the 2004 federal election – but they rejected Premiers' demands for a national program to purchase pharmaceuticals in bulk. As the Minister of Health, Dosanjh introduced Bill C-12 An Act to prevent the introduction and spread of communicable diseases which updated the 1985 Quarantine Act; it was given royal assent in May 2005.

In May 2005, opposition MP Gurmant Grewal accused Dosanjh and the Prime Minister's Chief of Staff, Tim Murphy, of attempting to bribe him with an ambassadorship and a senate seat for his wife, Nina Grewal, if he would cross the floor or abstain from a crucial upcoming vote. Grewal released tapes he secretly recorded of the conversation between Dosanjh, Grewal, and Murphy. Dosanjh claimed innocence and accused Grewal of altering the tapes to imply wrongdoing and the Prime Minister dismissed calls to remove Dosanjh from cabinet. Audio analysis concluded that the tapes were altered and the Royal Canadian Mounted Police did not pursue any criminal investigations. Nevertheless, fellow MP John Reynolds filed a complaint with the Law Society of British Columbia accusing Dosanjh of violating the Criminal Code and the society's Professional Conduct Handbook. The Law Society reviewed the affair and concluded that Grewal had attempted to elicit rewards for his compliance but cleared Dosanjh and Murphy of misconduct charges.

=== 39th Canadian Parliament ===
In the January 2006 federal election, Dosanjh decisively won his riding against Tarlok Sablok, the Indo-Canadian Conservative candidate, and the community activist and NDP candidate Bev Meslo. With the Liberal party forming the Official Opposition, Dosanjh became the critic for National Defence and sat on the Standing Committee on National Defence and the Standing Committee on Foreign Affairs and International Development. In the December 2006 Liberal leadership race he supported Bob Rae, a fellow former-NDP premier. When Rae was eliminated on the final ballot, Dosanjh supported Stéphane Dion. With Dion as the new leader, Dosanjh remained on the two committees but his critic responsibility was moved to Foreign Affairs. Dosanjh suffered a mild heart attack on the morning of February 13, 2007, outside the House of Commons. He was attended by fellow MP Carolyn Bennett, who is also a doctor, and he was rushed to hospital where a successful operation to remove a blood clot near his heart was performed. In the second session of the 39th Parliament, from October 2007 to September 2008, Dosanjh sat on the Standing Committee on Public Safety and National Security and the Special Committee on the Canadian Mission in Afghanistan, and his critic responsibility was moved Public Safety.

=== 40th Canadian Parliament ===
The next election was called for October 2008. Dosanjh faced sociologist Wai Young running for the Conservatives, health worker Ann Chambers running for the NDP, and an IT consultant, Csaba Gulyas for the Green Party. Dosanjh won by 33 votes over Young, both receiving 38.4% of the vote. A recount confirmed Dosanjh's victory but only by a margin of 22 votes. The Conservative Party requested a second, judicial recount, which again confirmed Dosanjh as the victor. In the 40th Canadian Parliament, with his party once again forming the official opposition, Dosanjh was appointed the National Defence critic for the first parliamentary session which was short-lived. During the 2008–09 Canadian parliamentary dispute he defended the proposed coalition government as a reaction to inappropriate leadership on economic issues by the existing government. When Dion resigned as party leader, Dosanjh considered but did not run for leadership citing his inability to speak French and again supported Rae's bid. In October 2009, Michael Ignatieff appointed Dosanjh as the Liberals' critic for National Defence.

When the 40th Parliament re-convened for its 2nd session Dosanjh continued as the National Defence critic and served on the Standing Committee on National Defence, as well as the Standing Committee on Justice and Human Rights, and the Special Committee on the Canadian Mission in Afghanistan. In the 3rd session of the 40th Parliament Dosanjh continued with the Standing Committee on National Defence and the Special Committee on the Canadian Mission in Afghanistan, but also sat with the Standing Committee on Health. In September 2010 he was reassigned to being the critic on health for the Liberal Party. Dosanjh introduced private member bill C-467 An Act to amend the Citizenship Act (children born abroad) in the 2nd session, and re-introduced it in the 3rd session where it received 2nd reading in September 2010, which would grant natural citizenship to children born to, or adopted by, Canadian citizens working for the federal government (including members of the Canadian Forces).

== Vaisakhi Parade controversy ==
On April 16, 2010, the day prior to the annual Vaisakhi Parade held in Surrey, B.C., one of the parade organizers issued a statement indicating should Dosanjh and BC Liberal backbencher Dave Hayer choose to attend the parade, their safety could not be guaranteed. This was due in part to comments that Dosanjh had made after the parade in 2007, suggesting a police investigation into reports of a parade float that had a picture of Talwinder Singh Parmar on it, accused in the Air India bombing.

"Everybody's invited except those who've been excluded", Bains said of the event that would include security for some participants. "Everyone (is invited) except... two people – Ujjal Dosanjh and Dave Hayer," he said. "We've never invited them. If they come they should bring their own security."

Premier Gordon Campbell called for an apology. None was forthcoming and all three declined to attend the parade.

On April 23, 2010, the RCMP launched an investigation into threats made against Dosanjh on a Facebook site, titled "Ujjal Dosanjh is a Sikh Traitor." Canada's parliamentarians condemned any death threats against Dosanjh.

== Award ==
In 2003, he was awarded Pravasi Bharatiya Samman by the President of India.

In 2009, he was one of the recipients of the Top 25 Canadian Immigrant Awards, presented by Canadian Immigrant Magazine.

== References and notes ==
27th Canadian Ministry (2003–2006) – Cabinet of Paul Martin
Cabinet post (1)
Predecessor	Office	Successor
Pierre Pettigrew	Minister of Health; 2004–2006	Tony Clement
Order of precedence
Preceded by Dan Miller	Order of precedence in British Columbia as of 2011	Succeeded by Gordon Campbell
