= Vancouver-Kensington =

Provincial electoral district in British Columbia, Canada

Coordinates: 49.242°N 123.078°W

British Columbia electoral district
- Location in Vancouver

Provincial electoral district
- Legislature: Legislative Assembly of British Columbia
MLA
Mable Elmore
New Democratic
- District created: 1991
- First contested: 1991
- Last contested: 2026

Demographics
- Population (2011): 57,790
- Area (km²): 8.95
- Pop. density (per km²): 6,457
- Census division: Metro Vancouver
- Census subdivision: Vancouver

Vancouver-Kensington is a provincial electoral district of the Legislative Assembly of British Columbia in Canada.

== Members of the Legislative Assembly ==
Since 2009, the district's member of the Legislative Assembly (MLA) has been Mable Elmore. She represents the British Columbia New Democratic Party.

Vancouver-Kensington
Assembly	Years	Member	Party
Riding created from Vancouver-Little Mountain and Vancouver South
35th	1991–1996	Ujjal Dosanjh	New Democratic
36th	1996–2001	Ujjal Dosanjh	New Democratic
37th	2001–2005	Patrick Wong	Liberal
38th	2005–2009	David Chudnovsky	New Democratic
39th	2009–2013	Mable Elmore	New Democratic
40th	2013–2017	Mable Elmore	New Democratic
41st	2017–2020	Mable Elmore	New Democratic
42nd	2020–2024	Mable Elmore	New Democratic
43rd	2024–2026	Mable Elmore	New Democratic
44th	2026–present	Mable Elmore	New Democratic

== Election results ==
Graph of the election results in Vancouver-Kensington (minor parties are combined into "Others")

2026 British Columbia general election
Party	Candidate	Votes	%	±%	Expenditures
New Democratic	Mable Elmore	7,275	46.59	-14.31	
Conservative	Aron Lageri	5,596	35.84	+4.34	
Green	Adam Hawk	2,706	17.39	+9.79	
Total valid votes		15,593	99.82		
Total rejected ballots		28	0.18		
Turnout					
Registered voters					
New Democratic hold		Swing		-9.33	
Source: Elections BC

2024 British Columbia general election
Party	Candidate	Votes	%	±%	Expenditures
New Democratic	Mable Elmore	11,713	60.9%	+0.93	
Conservative	Syed Mohsin	6,061	31.5%		
Green	Amy Fox	1,458	7.6%	-6.21	
Total valid votes		19,232	–		
Total rejected ballots					
Turnout					
Registered voters					
Source: Elections BC

2020 British Columbia general election
Party	Candidate	Votes	%	±%	Expenditures
New Democratic	Mable Elmore	12,481	59.97	+4.40	$6,860.33
Liberal	Paul Lepage	5,255	25.25	−6.91	$8,116.84
Green	Nazanin Moghadami	2,874	13.81	+2.34	$5,727.78
Independent	Salvatore Vetro	202	0.97	–	$5,942.50
Total valid votes		20,812	100.00	–	
Total rejected ballots		231	1.10	+0.09	
Turnout		21,043	50.89	−8.61	
Registered voters		41,346			
New Democratic hold		Swing		+5.66	
Source: Elections BC

2017 British Columbia general election
Party	Candidate	Votes	%	±%	Expenditures
New Democratic	Mable Elmore	12,503	55.57	+4.20	$35,037
Liberal	Kim Jee Chan Logan	7,236	32.16	−6.13	$64,066
Green	Simon Alexander Rear	2,580	11.47	+3.88	$1,518
Your Political Party	Ramanjit Kaur Dhillon	181	0.80	–	$1,341
Total valid votes		22,500	100.00	–	
Total rejected ballots		229	1.01	−0.20	
Turnout		22,729	59.50	+5.17	
Registered voters		38,199			
Source: Elections BC

2013 British Columbia general election
Party	Candidate	Votes	%	±%	Expenditures
New Democratic	Mable Elmore	10,687	51.37	−1.18	$64,956
Liberal	Gabby Kalaw	7,965	38.29	−2.34	$63,669
Green	Chris Fjell	1,578	7.59	+0.77	$2,530
Conservative	Raj Gupta	572	2.75	–	$6,467
Total valid votes		20,802	100.00		
Total rejected ballots		254	1.21		
Turnout		21,056	54.33		
Source: Elections BC

2009 British Columbia general election
Party	Candidate	Votes	%	Expenditures
New Democratic	Mable Elmore	9,930	52.55	$85,850
Liberal	Syrus Lee	7,678	40.63	$39,514
Green	Doug Warkentin	1,288	6.82	$780
Total valid votes		18,896	100	
Total rejected ballots		210	1.1	
Turnout		19,106	51.98	

2005 British Columbia general election
Party	Candidate	Votes	%	Expenditures
New Democratic	David Chudnovsky	10,573	49.97	$79,895
Liberal	Patrick Wong	8,949	42.29	$106,628
Green	Cody Matheson	1,273	6.02	$893
Marijuana	John Patrick Gordon	266	1.26	$100
People's Front	Charles Boylan	99	0.47	$103
Total		21,160	100.00	
Total rejected ballots		302	1.4	
Turnout		21,462	58.46	

2001 British Columbia general election
Party	Candidate	Votes	%	±	Expenditures
Liberal	Patrick Wong	9,162	47.56%		$37,139
NDP	Ujjal Dosanjh	7,478	38.82%		$62,038
Green	Betty Krawczyk	1,795	9.32%	–	$16,056
Marijuana	John Patrick Gordon	516	2.68%		$721
Unity	John Francis O'Flynn	314	1.62%		$1,357
Total valid votes		19,265	100.00%		
Total rejected ballots		250	1.30%		
Turnout		19,515	73.09%		

1996 British Columbia general election
Party	Candidate	Votes	%	±	Expenditures
NDP	Ujjal Dosanjh	9,496	50.74%		$49,807
Liberal	Gim Huey	7,608	40.65%		$34,923
Progressive Democrat	Don Seykens	537	2.87%	–	$100
Reform	Kirk Pankey	472	2.52%		$1,238
Green	Kelly White	349	1.86%	–	$100
Social Credit	Damon Wong	135	0.72%	–	$1,029
Family Coalition	Mark Toth	119	0.64%	–	$487
Total valid votes		18,716	100.00%		
Total rejected ballots		218	1.15%		
Turnout		18,934	70.25%		

1991 British Columbia general election
Party	Candidate	Votes	%	±	Expenditures
NDP	Ujjal Dosanjh	8,323	46.85%		$37,210
Liberal	Ted Olynyk	4,700	26.45%		$2,679
Social Credit	Gim Huey	4,389	24.70%	–	$51,080
Green	Bryan Wagman	155	0.87%	–	
Family Coalition	John O'Flynn	151	0.85%	–	$500
Non-affiliated (Communist League)	Colleen Levis	49	0.28%		$247
Total valid votes		17,767	100.00%		
Total rejected ballots		644	3.50%		
Turnout		18,411	72.14%		

== See also ==
- List of British Columbia provincial electoral districts
- Canadian provincial electoral districts

Legislative Assembly of British Columbia
Preceded by North Coast	Constituency represented by the premier of British Columbia; 2000–2001	Succeeded by Vancouver-Point Grey
