= David Chudnovsky (politician) =

Canadian politician (born 1949)

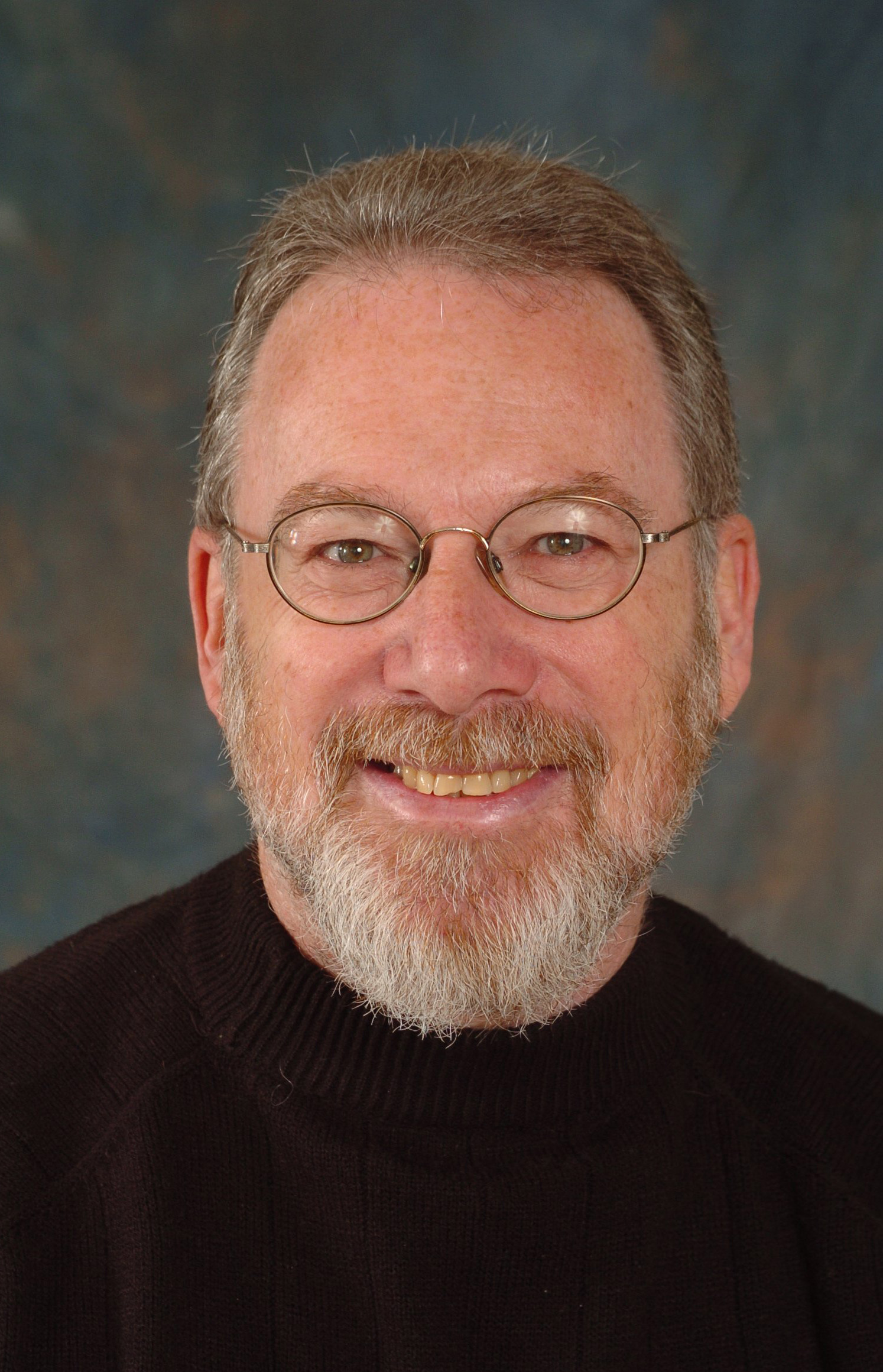

MLA for Vancouver-Kensington
- In office 2005–2009
- Preceded by: Patrick Wong
- Succeeded by: Mable Elmore

Personal details
- Born: 1949 (age 76–77) Toronto, Ontario
- Party: British Columbia New Democratic Party; OneCity Vancouver (2014-present)
- Spouse: Ruth Herman
- Education: York University (BA); University of Toronto (BEd)
- Profession: Teacher

David Chudnovsky (born 1949) is a Canadian politician. As a member of the British Columbia New Democratic Party (BC NDP), he served as the member of the Legislative Assembly for Vancouver-Kensington from 2005 to 2009. A teacher by training, he previously served as the president of the British Columbia Teachers' Federation (BCTF) from 1999 to 2002, representing the 45,000 public school teachers in British Columbia.

== Life and career ==
Born in Toronto, Ontario, Chudnovsky grew up in a political household, and both his parents were union supporters. He attended York University, where he received a B.A. in history and political science. He then lived in London, England, for a year, and got a teaching job under the Inner London Education Authority. After returning to Canada, he enrolled in the University of Toronto's Faculty of Education, from which he received his Bachelor of Education degree.

He taught at Vincent Massey Collegiate Institute in Etobicoke for a couple years before getting laid off, then moved to British Columbia in 1978 where he began a teaching position at Bridgeview Community School in Surrey. He became involved in the Surrey Teachers’ Association, eventually serving as president for 2 years in the late 1980s. He was later elected member at-large of the BCTF's Executive Committee, and served as president from 1999 to 2002.

In the 2005 provincial election, Chudnovsky ran for the BC NDP against one-term incumbent BC Liberal candidate Patrick Wong in the riding of Vancouver-Kensington, winning the seat by 1,624 votes. In his only term in the BC legislature, he variously served as opposition critic for transportation, housing, and homelessness and mental health.

Chudnovsky decided not to seek re-election to the provincial legislature in the 2009 provincial election. In his final speech before the legislative assembly, Chudnovsky decried the petty partisanship and dysfunctionality of parliament, called for limits to party discipline, more bipartisan cooperation at committee level, and a form of mixed member proportional representation.

He turned his attention to municipal politics in Vancouver, becoming an executive with the Coalition of Progressive Electors (COPE) and chair of the party's fundraising committee. He then left COPE and joined R. J. Aquino in founding OneCity Vancouver in 2014. In 2026, Chudnovsky endorsed Avi Lewis in that year's federal NDP leadership race.

Chudnovsky and his wife have two children. He served on the boards of Surrey-Delta Immigrant Services Society and the Charter for Public Education Network.
