= Dosanjh Kalan =

- Village
- Location in Punjab, India Dosanjh Kalan (India)
- Coordinates: 31.1706977°N 75.8353239°E
- Country: India
- State: Punjab
- District: Jalandhar
- Tehsil: Phillaur
- Elevation: 246 m (807 ft)

Population (2011)
  - Total: 3,883
- Sex ratio 1933/1950 ♂/♀

Languages
  - Official: Punjabi
- Time zone: UTC+5:30 (IST)
- PIN: 144502
- Telephone code: 01826
- ISO 3166 code: IN-PB
- Vehicle registration: PB 37
- Post office: Dosanjh Kalan
- Website: jalandhar.nic.in

Dosanjh Kalan is a village in Phillaur tehsil of Jalandhar District of Punjab State, India.

It is situated on Phagwara-Mukandpur road. The village is 10 kilometres (6.2 mi) from Phagwara, 19 kilometres (12 mi) from Banga, 32 kilometres (20 mi) from Jalandhar, and 123 kilometres (76 mi) from the state capital at Chandigarh. The village is administrated by a Sarpanch who is the elected representative of the village

== Etymology and History ==
Dosanjh is an inherited clan name of Sikh (Agriculturist) named after village "Dosanjh" settled by Sangha Jatts, Although Dosanjh Kalan was established by the member of Dosanjh Chiefs couple of centuries ago.

== Education ==
The village has a girls only upper primary with secondary/higher secondary Punjabi medium school which was founded in 1911. The school provide a mid-day meal as per the Indian Midday Meal Scheme. The village also has some private co-ed schools such as:

- G.H.R.K.S.C. School Dosanjh Kalan (upper primary with secondary/higher secondary, founded in 1932)
- Guru Gobind Singh Model School (primary with upper primary)
- Jyoti Model School (primary only)

== Transport ==
=== Rail ===
The nearest train station is situated 11 kilometres (6.8 mi) away in Goraya and Jalandhar City Railway Station is 32 km away from the village.

== Notable people ==
- Bannet Dosanjh
- Diljit Dosanjh
- Ujjal Dosanjh
