= Surrey LRT =

Overview
- Status: Cancelled
- Owner: TransLink
- Locale: Surrey, British Columbia
- Termini: Newton Exchange; Guildford Exchange
- Stations: 11
- Website: surreylightrail.ca

Service
- Type: Light rail
- System: TransLink

Technical
- Line length: 10.5 kilometres (6.5 mi)
- Character: At-grade
- Track gauge: 1,435 mm (4 ft 8 1/2 in)

The Surrey Light Rail system was a planned 10.5-kilometre (6.5 mi) network in Surrey, British Columbia, consisting of one light rail line radiating from the Surrey Central SkyTrain station and transit hub. First proposed in 2012 by Surrey mayor Dianne Watts, construction on the project was planned to start in 2019 with an opening date set for 2024. At the inauguration of the new Surrey City Council on November 5, 2018, and after a change of municipal leadership, the newly installed council unanimously voted to "indefinitely suspend" the project in favour of an extension of the SkyTrain Expo Line to Langley Centre.

== Timeline ==
This project—among others, including the extension of the Millennium Line west to Arbutus—was included as one of the initiatives in need of funding that was proposed to be raised by the imposition of a regional sales tax which was put forward for voter approval in a 2015 plebiscite. The electorate voted against the tax increase to fund regional projects and provide a long term sustainable funding model; however, Surrey mayor Linda Hepner said, after the sales tax was voted down, that the city still planned to build the light rail project as it was the main component in her election campaign.

The Surrey–Newton–Guildford Line was expected to be in service by 2024 while the Surrey–Langley Line on the Fraser Highway would be completed at a later date. A report outlining the economic benefits of the project was produced by a consulting firm in May 2015.

In 2017, the federal government budget included funding contributions to this project. Prior to the provincial election in 2017, the BC Liberals confirmed they would match the federal contribution if they were re-elected.

On March 16, 2018, the provincial government approved the construction of this project. Construction was slated to begin in 2019 and was expected to be completed by 2024. The LRT line would have run from Guildford through Surrey Central and terminated in Newton with 11 new stops.

On September 4, 2018, during a visit to Surrey, Prime Minister of Canada Justin Trudeau reiterated the federal government's financial commitment to helping to build the route. On November 5, 2018, during newly elected mayor Doug McCallum's first council meeting, the council voted unanimously to cancel the LRT line in favour of extending the existing SkyTrain line to Langley. The plan was supported by the regional TransLink Mayors' Council on November 15, 2018.

== LRT network ==
=== Surrey–Newton–Guildford Line ===
Phase 1 of the Surrey LRT was the Surrey–Newton–Guildford Line, which was to replace the 96 B-Line express bus service once completed and would have connected Surrey City Centre with Newton Town Centre via King George Boulevard and Guildford Town Centre via 104 Avenue.

Proposed stops

- 152 Street Guildford Town Centre: serves the Guildford Mall and connects to the existing transit exchange
- 148 Street
- 144 Street
- 140 Street
- City Parkway: connects to the SkyTrain at Surrey Central station, Simon Fraser University, the planned Kwantlen Polytechnic University, Central City Shopping Centre and Surrey City Hall
- King George: connects to the SkyTrain at King George station and the King George Hub development complex
- 96 Avenue: serves Surrey Memorial Hospital, the wider hospital district and the Canada Revenue site
- 88 Avenue: serves Bear Creek Park and the Surrey Arts Centre
- 80 Avenue
- 76 Avenue
- 72 Avenue: serves Newton Town Centre, connecting to a new planned transit exchange and higher-density developments

== Proposed expansion ==
A Surrey–Langley Line was proposed as a future phase after the completion of the Surrey–Newton–Guildford Line and was expected to travel on Fraser Highway and connecting Surrey City Centre, Fleetwood Town Centre and Langley, with expected travel time of 24.5 minutes. The Surrey–Langley SkyTrain extension will take roughly the same route.

== Reaction ==
The Surrey LRT project had been criticized by some local residents, and an advocacy group, who had raised concerns suggesting a lack of travel-time improvement, large annual operating deficits, vulnerability to accidents and a lower comparative business case benefits documented in the 2012 TransLink joint analysis.

Kevin Desmond, CEO of TransLink at the time, indicated in 2016 that SkyTrain along the second phase of the project (Fraser Highway Line) was also a possibility instead of LRT; however, Hepner claimed that a SkyTrain solution along Fraser Highway would cost $950 million more than LRT.

In July 2018, a poll sponsored by municipal party Safe Surrey Coalition, headed by Doug McCallum—then a mayoral candidate in the 2018 Surrey municipal election who was campaigning against LRT—indicated 85% of Surrey residents were opposed to the LRT project.

== See also ==
- Light rail in Canada
- SkyTrain
