= R6 Scott Rd =

Express bus service in Metro Vancouver, Canada

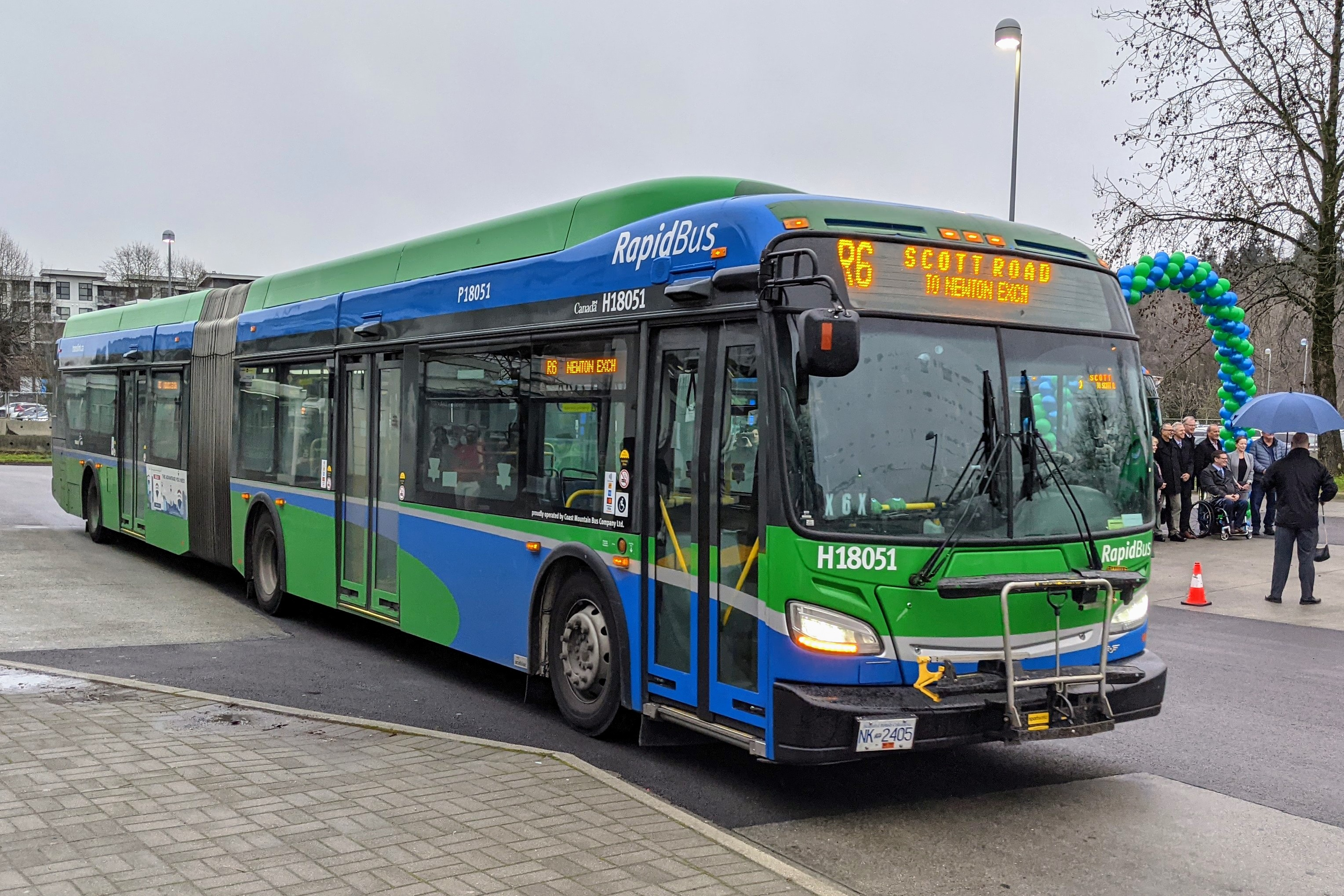
- An R6 Scott Rd at Scott Road station

Overview
- System: TransLink
- Operator: Coast Mountain Bus Company
- Began service: January 2, 2024

Route
- Start: Scott Road station
- End: Newton Exchange
- Length: 12.1 km (7.5 mi)
- Stops: 13

Service
- Ridership: 15,060 (avg. weekday; 2025)
Route map
R6 Scott Rd highlighted in green
Key

The R6 Scott Rd is an express bus service with bus rapid transit elements in Metro Vancouver, British Columbia, Canada. Part of TransLink's RapidBus network, it travels along Scott Road and 72 Avenue in Surrey and connects Scott Road station, North Delta, and Newton.

The route began service on January 2, 2024. In its second year of service, it was the sixth busiest bus route in TransLink's network, with 5,004,000 boardings.

== History ==
On June 28, 2018, the TransLink Mayors' Council and TransLink's board of directors approved the second phase of the 10-Year Vision. This phase included provisions for two new B-Line routes, one of which would connect Newton Exchange to the SkyTrain's Expo Line via Scott Road.

During a presentation to Delta city council on November 9, 2020, TransLink stated that the route would be named the R6 Scott Rd RapidBus, and run from Newton Exchange to Scott Road station. This planned route would not directly stop at Scottsdale Exchange in order to shorten the travel time along the route.

Construction on the route started in April 2023 to introduce bus priority lanes, queue jumps, and remove bus bays for congestion mitigation.

The route operated on a holiday schedule on January 1, 2024, before officially launching on January 2. Next-bus signage was installed at all stops on the route by mid-2024.

In its first year of operation, the R6 Scott Road RapidBus was the sixth busiest bus route in TransLink's network, with 5,246,000 boardings in 2024.

== Route description ==
Starting at Scott Road station, the R6 travels south along Scott Road towards 72 Avenue, then continues east along 72 Avenue towards Newton Exchange. It follows the same route as No. 319.

=== Stops ===
- Scott Road station – connects to the Expo line and also serves South Westminster and Bridgeview
- 103A Avenue
- 96 Avenue
- 92 Avenue – serves Annieville
- Nordel Way
- 84 Avenue
- 80 Avenue
- 75 Avenue
- 72 Avenue – connects to Scottsdale Exchange and serves the Scottsdale area
- 124 Street
- 128 Street – serves Kwantlen Polytechnic University
- 132 Street
- Newton Exchange – serves Newton Town Centre and connects to the R1 King George Blvd, as well other local services to Surrey, Langley and White Rock and express service to Richmond

== Future plans ==
As part of their 10-year priorities for Transport 2050, TransLink plans on upgrading the R6 route into a true bus rapid transit (BRT) route with fully separated bus lanes.

== Public art installations ==
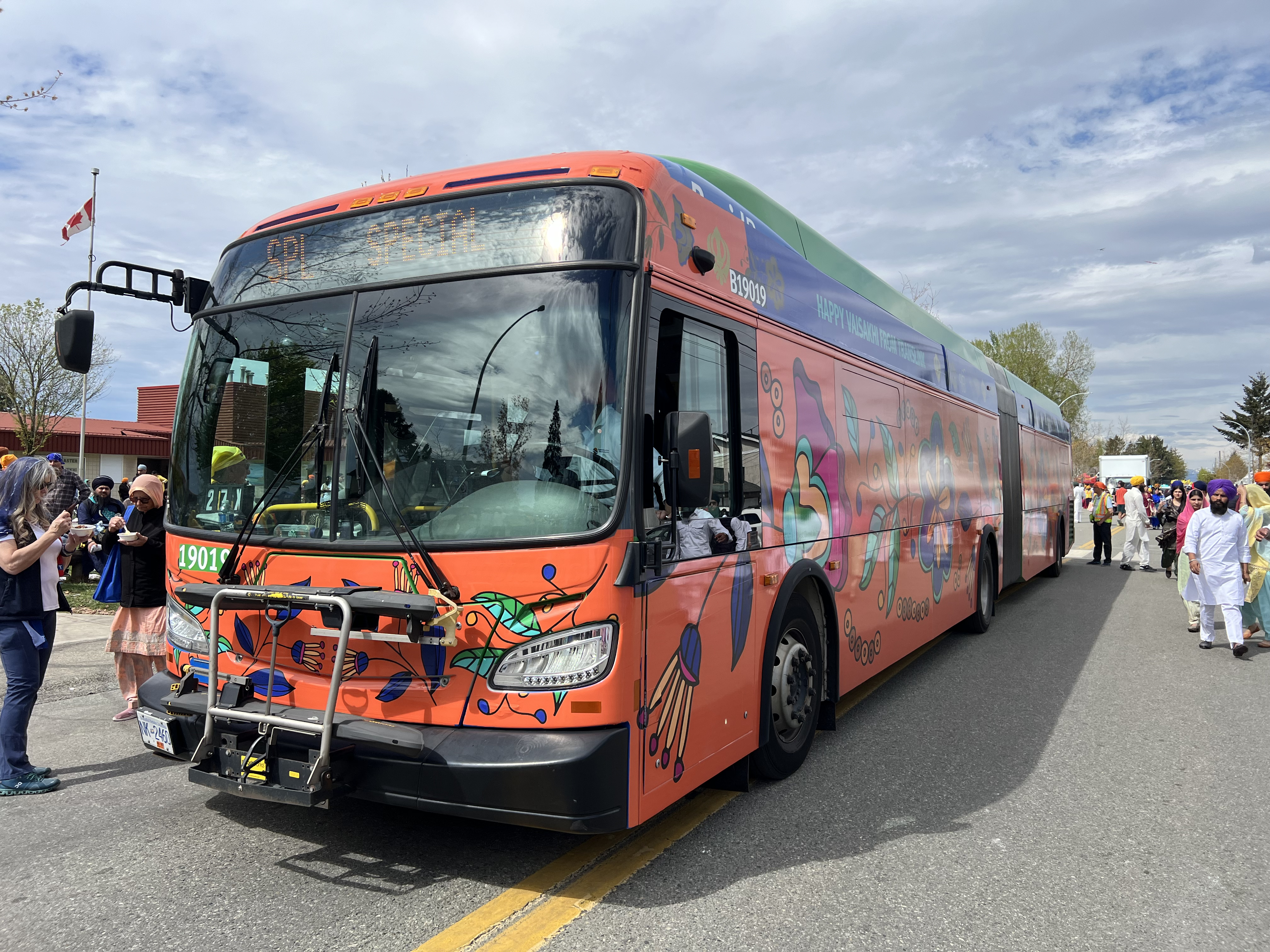
RapidBus unit at a Vaisakhi parade in Surrey in 2024. The wrap design was inspired by Rumala Sahibs.

Several stops on the route feature art inspired by South Asian culture. Some of these stops depict a Northern Goshak, phulkari textiles, jaali patterns, and a dari mosaic.

One vehicle was wrapped in celebration of Vaisakhi in 2024. The bus was part of the Vaisakhi parade in both Vancouver and Surrey, and was used in regular service for both the R6 and the R4 routes for a time.

== See also ==
- List of bus routes in Metro Vancouver
