= Surrey-Newton =

Surrey-Newton may refer to:

- Surrey-Newton (provincial electoral district)
- Surrey Newton (federal electoral district)
- Newton, Surrey - Town centre in Surrey, BC
