= Newton, Surrey =

Newton
- Town centre of Surrey
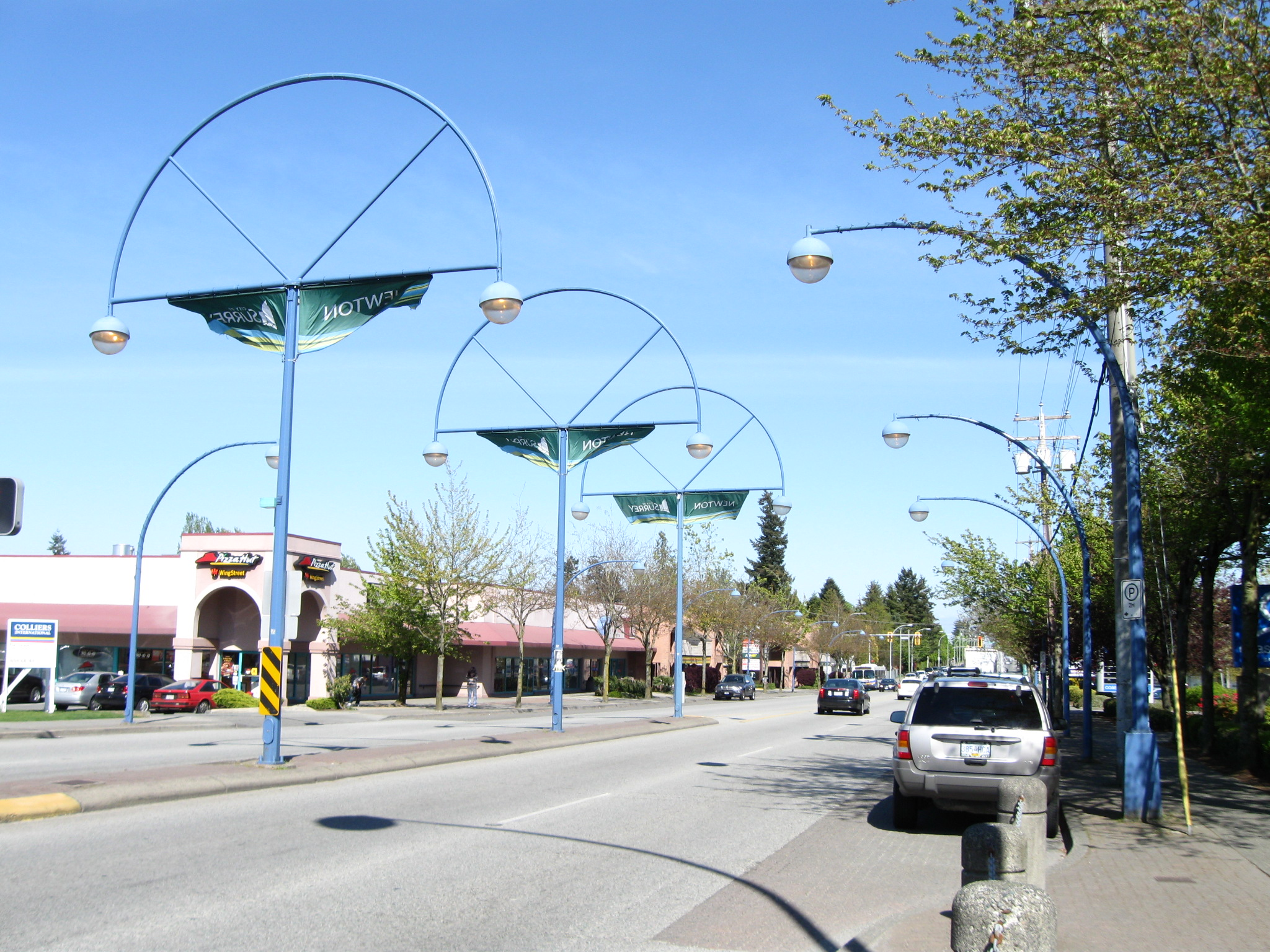
- East facing view of 72 Avenue in Newton.

- Location of Newton within Metro Vancouver
- Coordinates: 49.1333°N 122.8413°W
- Country: Canada
- Province: British Columbia
- Region: Lower Mainland
- Regional District: Metro Vancouver
- City: Surrey

Government
  - Mayor: Brenda Locke
  - MP (Fed.): Sukh Dhaliwal (Liberal) Surrey Newton
  - MLA (Prov.): Jessie Sunner (NDP) Surrey-Newton

Population (2016)
  - Total: 149,040
- Time zone: UTC−8 (PST)
  - Summer (DST): UTC−7 (PDT)

Newton is a town centre of the city in Surrey, British Columbia. It is the location for the previous Surrey City Hall and Courthouse, two local Surrey Public Library branches, and Kwantlen Polytechnic University's main campus. The studios of radio station Red FM are also located here.

== History ==
Prior to the arrival of European settlers, what is now Newton was the territory of Coast Salish peoples of the Katzie, Kwantlen, and Semiahmoo first nations.

Newton is named after settler Elias John Newton (January 29, 1841 – August 1, 1907), a saddler and harness-maker, who settled in the area in 1886 after being raised in Richmond, Ottawa, Ontario. His real name was Villeneuve (which translates to "New Town" from French), but surrounded by anglophone neighbours, he translated his last name to its English equivalent.

In the 19th century, much of the coniferous forest in Newton was logged to provide space for farms. Settlement increased greatly at the end of World War I, when settler farmers built farms surrounding the stumps remaining from previous logging.

The BC Electric Railway stimulated Newton’s growth and helped to establish the corner of 72 Avenue and King George Boulevard when they opened the Newton Station in 1910.

Newton Elementary opened in 1914, with further city services opening later in the 1970s and 80s.

== Geography ==
For planning purposes, the City of Surrey generally considers Newton's borders to be: 120 Street on the west; Colebrook Road to the south, and 160 Street to the east. The northern boundary varies between 80 and 88 avenues.

To the south of Newton is Boundary Bay; the northern portion of it is called Mud Bay, also the name of a park and the lands adjacent to it.

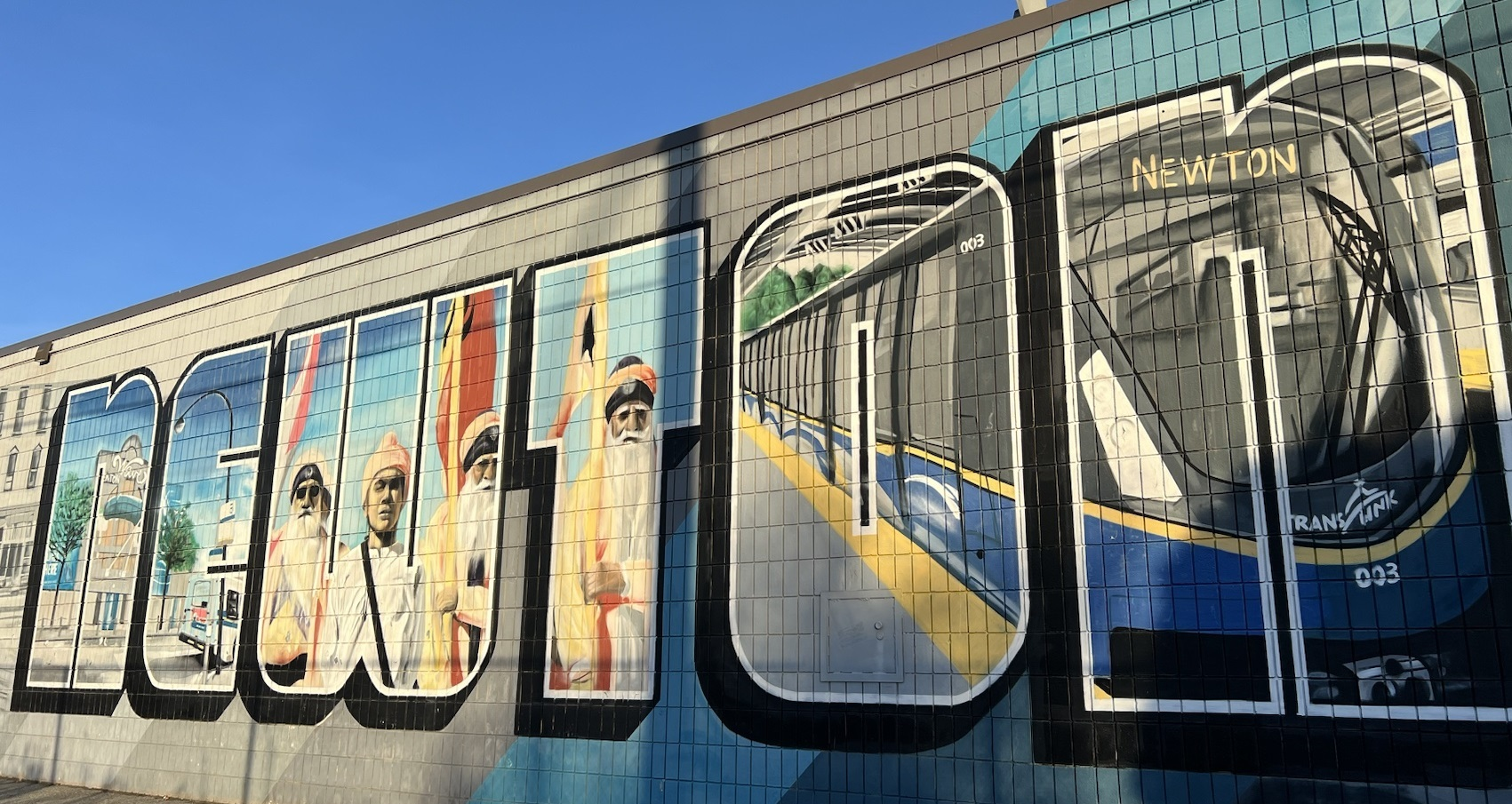
Newton Mural by Danny Fernandez. From left to right the mural features the Newton Wave Pool, men walking in Surrey's Vaisakhi parade, and a Skytrain heading to Newton (despite no such skytrain route existing).

Newton sits roughly 100 meters (318 feet) above sea level. Newton has a land area of roughly 48.69 km^{2} (18.80 mi^{2}).

== Demographics ==
Faith in Newton, Surrey (2021)
1. Sikh (51.5%)
2. Christian (16.4%)
3. No religion (13.9%)
4. Muslim (8.70%)
5. Hindu (8.10%)
6. Buddhist (0.90%)
7. Jewish (0.10%)
8. Other faiths (0.40%)

Newton has the largest population of all the city's town centres, as well as the most ethnically diverse population; over half of the population is ethnically South Asian (predominantly Punjabi). Newton is the world's only Sikh majority neighbourhood outside India. As of 2016, the population of Newton stands at 149,040.

Ethnic groups in Newton (2016) Source:		%
Ethnic group	South Asian	58%
Ethnic group	European	25%
Ethnic group	Filipino	5%
Ethnic group	Chinese	3%
Ethnic group	Arab	3%
Ethnic group	Aboriginal	2%
Ethnic group	Other	4%
Total %		100%

Languages spoken in Newton (2016) Source:		%
Language	English	54%
Language	Punjabi	33%
Language	Hindi	2%
Language	Arabic	1%
Language	Tagalog	1%
Language	Other	8%
Total %		100%

== Culture ==
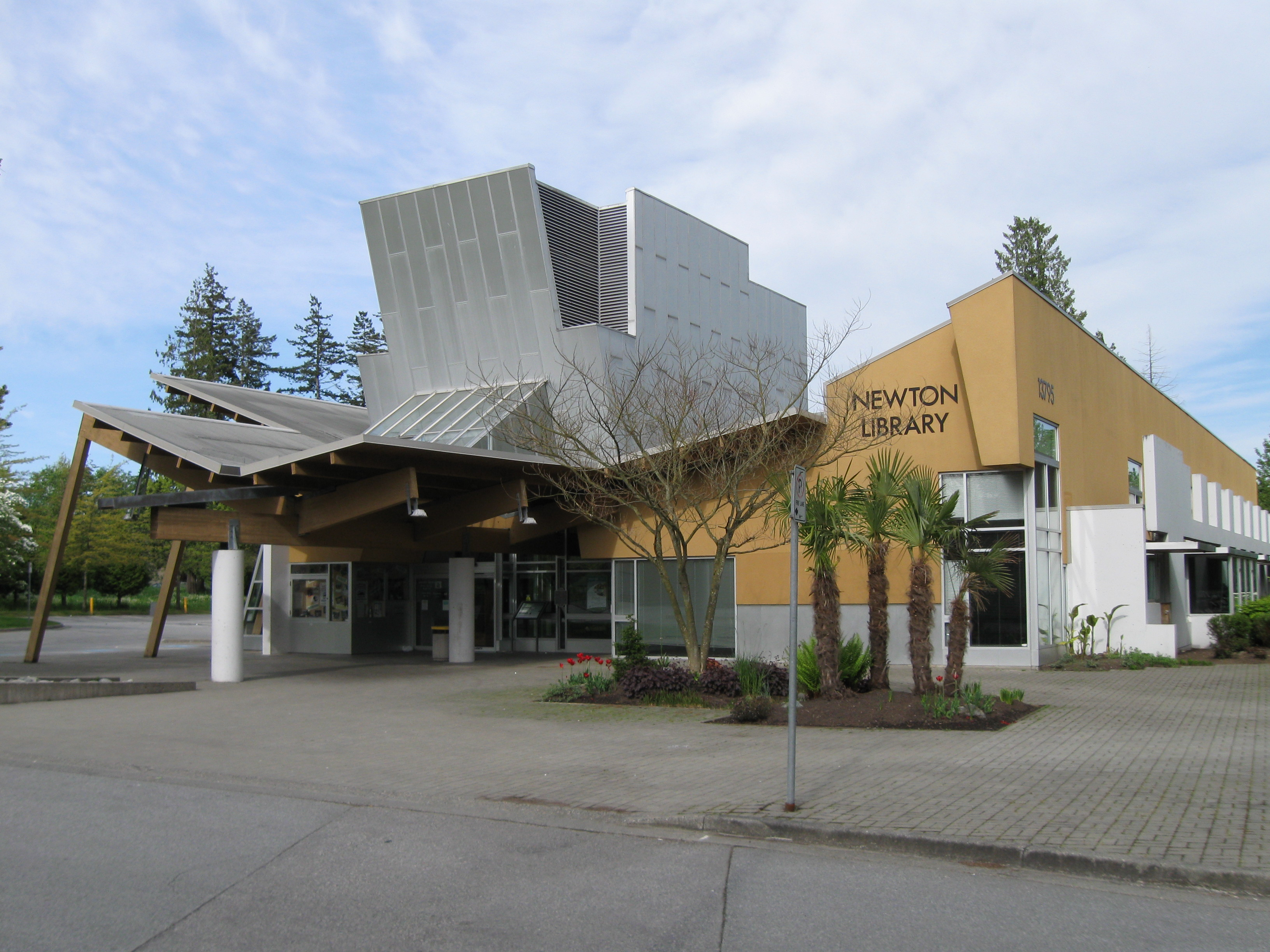
The Award winning Newton Library branch of the Surrey Public Library at 13795 70th Avenue in Surrey, BC, Canada. It was officially opened on May 2, 1992.

Surrey's annual Vaisakhi parade takes place in Newton. It is the largest outside of India, with the Surrey RCMP estimating an attendance of more than 500,000 people in 2024. Newton is also home to the Newton Culture Centre.

== Transportation ==
TransLink operates bus service throughout Newton, with two bus stations and two RapidBus lines. The R1 King George Blvd RapidBus runs to Newton Exchange from Guildford Exchange, with stops at King George and Surrey Central skytrain stations. The R6 Scott Rd connects Scott Road Skytrain Station, North Delta, and Newton. In addition to Newton Exchange, Scottsdale Exchange is located in the Scottsdale area of Newton.

== Industry ==
Newton contains a third of the businesses in Surrey and is home to the majority of Surrey's industrial base.

== See also ==
- Surrey-Newton provincial electoral district
- Surrey-Panorama Ridge provincial electoral district
- Newton-North Delta federal electoral district
