= King George station =

Metro Vancouver SkyTrain station

King George
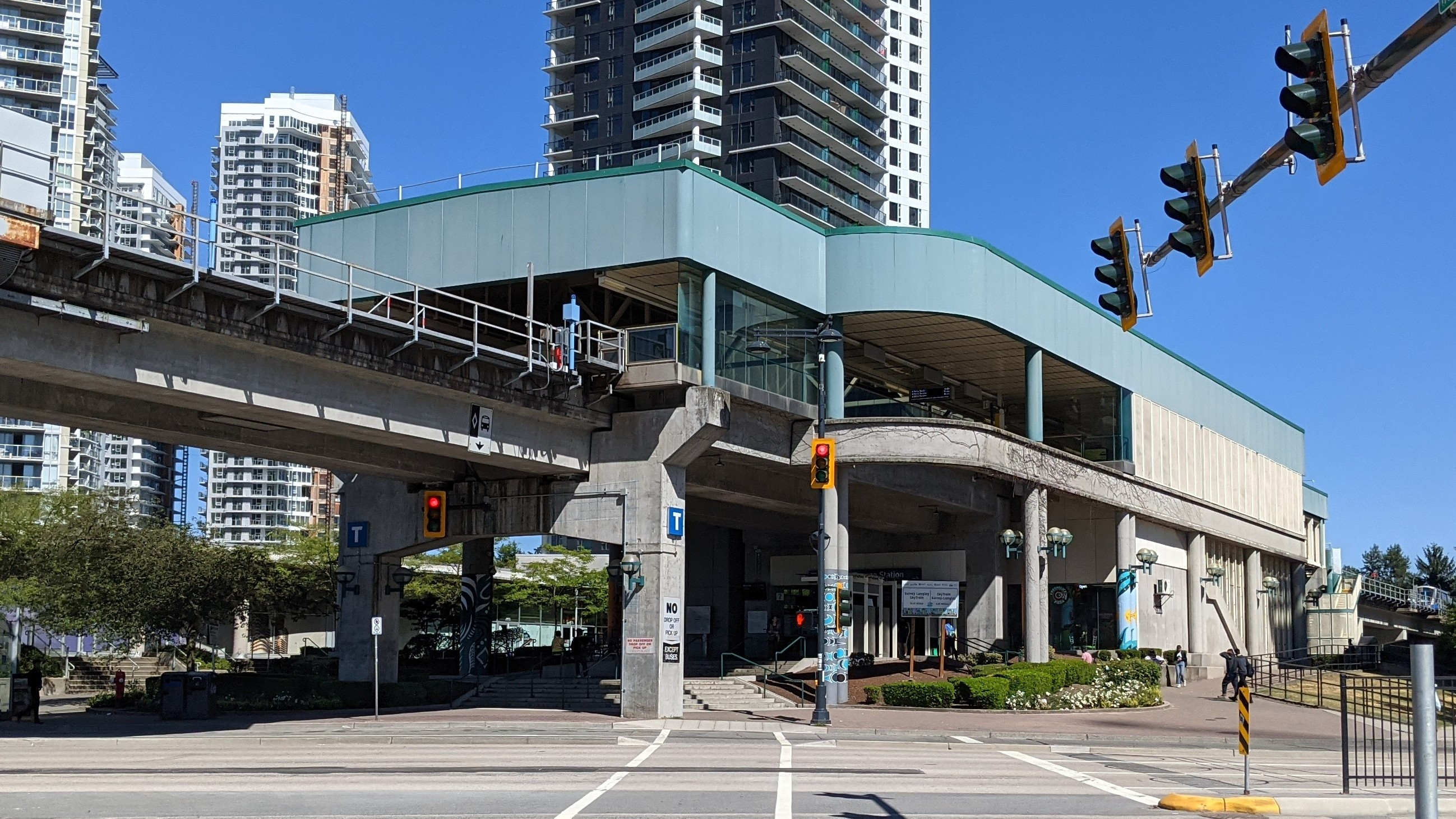
- West entrance to the King George stationhouse

General information
- Location: 9904 King George Blvd; Surrey, British Columbia; Canada
- Coordinates: 49.1827°N 122.8446°W
- System: SkyTrain station
- Owner: TransLink
- Platforms: Side platforms
- Tracks: 2
- Connections: R1 King George Blvd

Construction
- Structure type: Elevated
- Accessible: yes

Other information
- Station code: KG
- Fare zone: 3

History
- Opened: March 28, 1994; 32 years ago

Passengers
- 2025: 4,789,000 ▲8.7%
- Rank: 10 of 54

Services
Preceding station	TransLink	Following station
Surrey Central towards Waterfront	Expo Line Surrey branch	Terminus
Future service
Preceding station	TransLink	Following station
Surrey Central towards Waterfront	Expo Line Langley extension (opens 2029)	Green Timbers towards Langley City Centre
Location

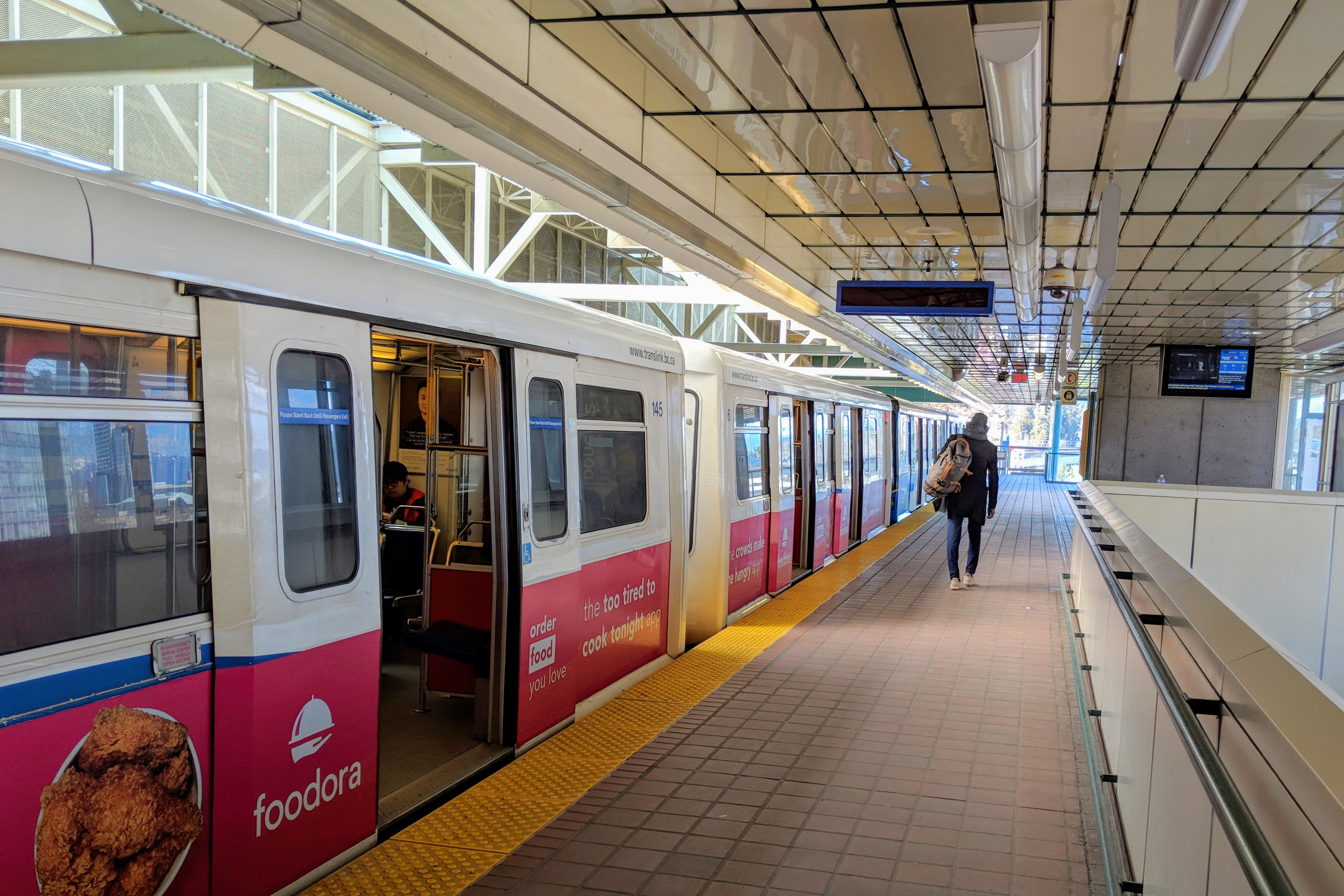
Platform level at King George in March 2019

King George is an elevated station on the Expo Line of Metro Vancouver's SkyTrain rapid transit system. The station is located in the south end of the Surrey City Centre district of Surrey, British Columbia, Canada, and is one of the outbound termini of the Expo Line, the other being Production Way–University station. The station is located on King George Boulevard at Holland Commons, just north of Fraser Highway.

The station is within walking distance to Holland Park and Surrey Memorial Hospital. A number of mixed-use developments continue to be built near the station, such as the King George Hub development, which displaced the park and ride facility that had once served the station.

== History ==
King George station was opened in 1994 as part of the second extension of the Expo Line into Surrey; the other stations included on this extension were Gateway and Surrey Central. The station is named for nearby King George Boulevard, which in turn is named after King George VI, who visited the municipality of Surrey in 1939.

Since opening in 1994, it has served as an outbound terminus of the Expo Line. The tracks continue beyond the station for about a block before they terminate and are used to store extra cars and to allow outbound trains to switch tracks for their ensuing inbound runs; plans call for the line to be extended deeper into Surrey, following Fraser Highway.

In 2022, an Expo Line extension from King George station to 203 Street in Langley City was approved. Construction on the 16-kilometre (9.9 mi) extension was scheduled to begin in 2024 and be completed by 2029.

Between April 27 and June 9, 2024, King George station was temporarily closed to allow for replacement work on two switches and a section of third rail between King George and Surrey Central stations. During this time, various repairs and upgrades were completed on the station, including platform work to accommodate Alstom Mark V trainsets.

== Station information ==
=== Entrances ===
- East entrance: is accessible from Whalley Boulevard and includes a designated passenger drop-off area. Bus connections at this entrance serve Fleetwood, Langley and White Rock.
- West entrance: is located on King George Boulevard and provides access to bus routes serving Guildford, Newton, North Delta and White Rock.

=== Transit connections ===
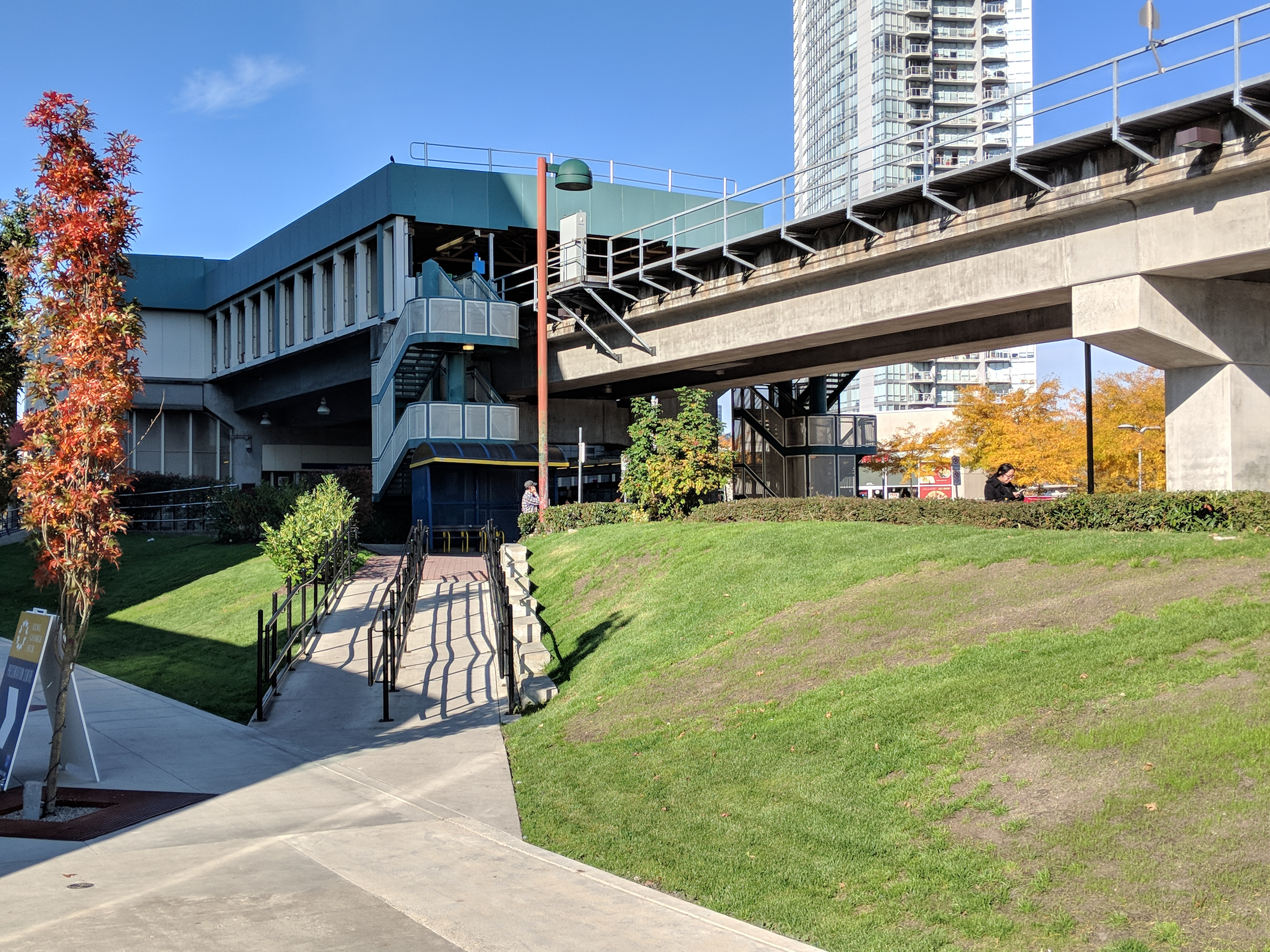
King George station's eastern entrance is accessible via Whalley Boulevard.

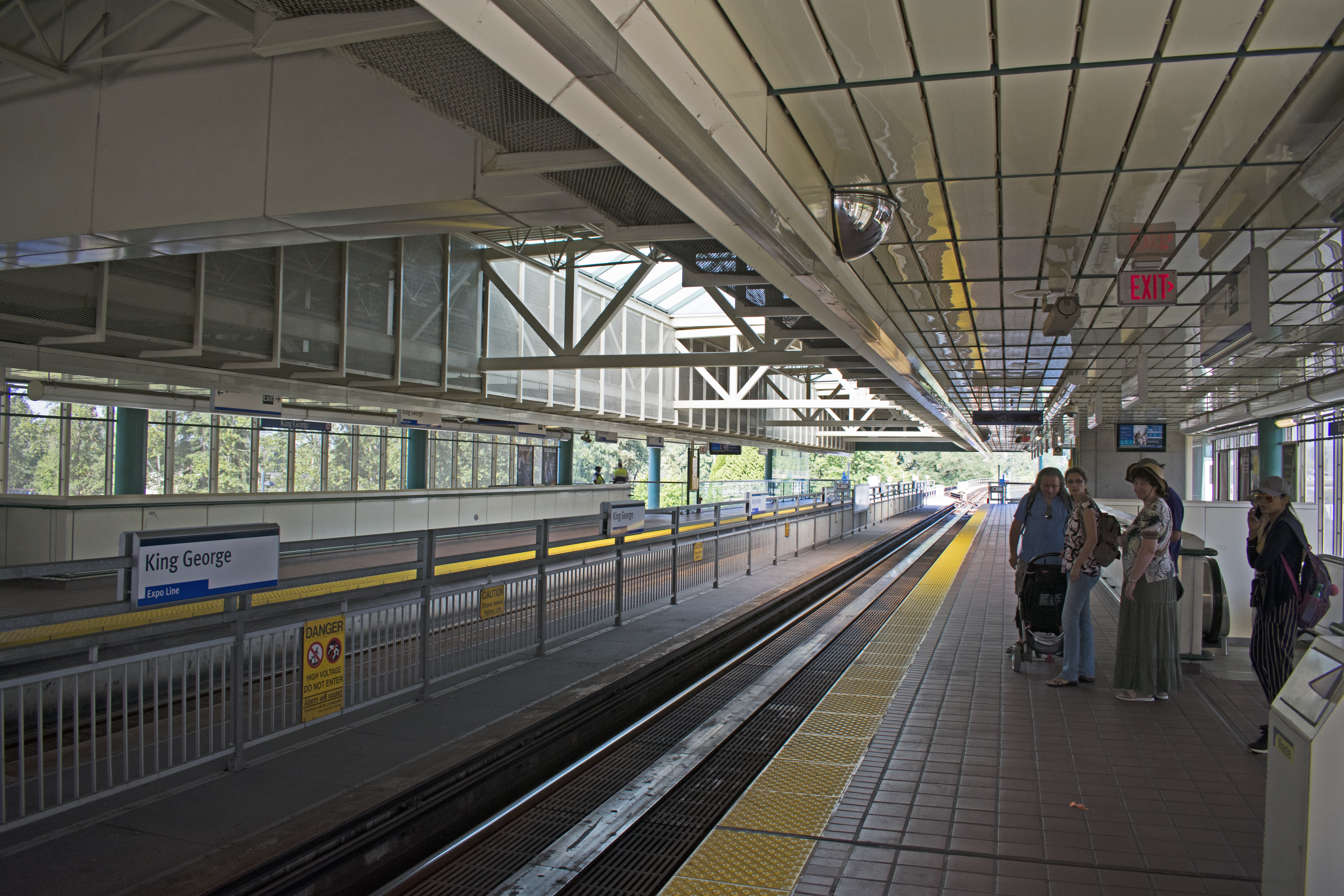
Platforms

King George station is a major connection point for the TransLink bus network for Delta, Langley, Surrey and White Rock.

As of January 2024, the following routes serve King George station:

Bay	Location	Routes
1	King George Boulevard; Southbound	R1 King George Blvd to Newton Exchange; 314 Sunbury; 321 White Rock Centre; 326 Guildford; 329 Scottsdale
2	King George Boulevard; Northbound	345 White Rock Centre (Monday to Friday only); 394 White Rock Centre (Monday to Friday, peak hours only); 395 Langley Centre (Monday to Friday, peak hours only)
4	King George Boulevard; Northbound	R1 King George Blvd to Guildford Exchange; To Surrey Central Station: 314, 321, 326, 329, 502, 503
5	King George Boulevard; Southbound	502 Langley Centre; 503 Fraser Hwy Express to Aldergrove / Langley Centre

== See also ==
- Royal eponyms in Canada
