= RapidBus (TransLink) =

Express bus network in Metro Vancouver, Canada

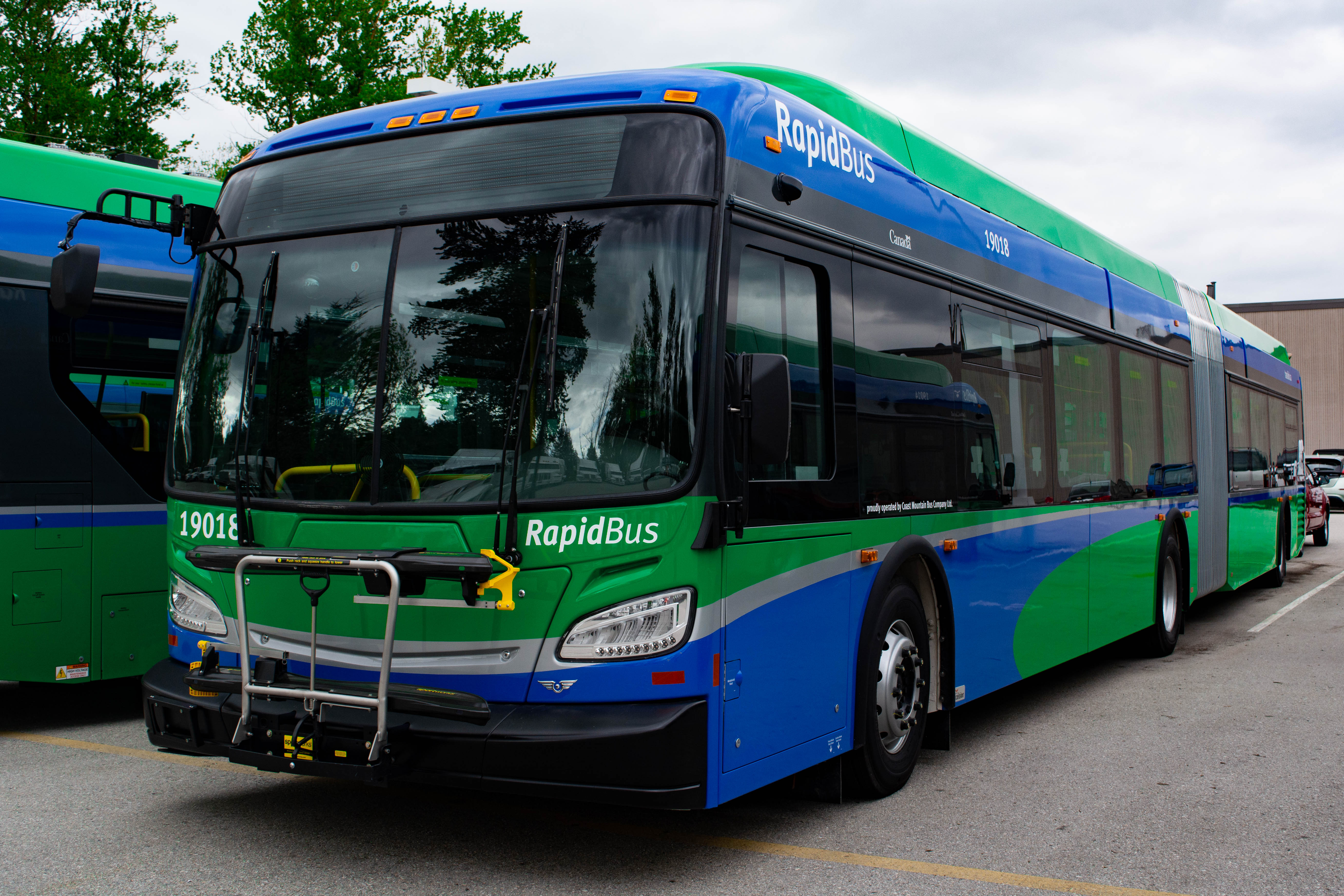

Overview
- System: TransLink
- Operator: Coast Mountain Bus Company
- Began service: January 6, 2020
- Routes: 6
- Stops: 80
Route map
RapidBus highlighted in green

RapidBus is an express bus network with bus rapid transit elements in Metro Vancouver, British Columbia, Canada.

== History ==
On November 23, 2016, the TransLink Mayors' Council and TransLink's board of directors approved the first phase of the 10-Year Vision, which included provisions for new B-Line routes (later rebranded as RapidBus) which began service in January 2020. In July 2019, TransLink announced that all future B-Line routes would officially be launched under new "RapidBus" branding and that the 95 and 96 B-Lines would also transition to that branding, leaving route 99 as the only remaining B-Line.

The first wave of routes using the RapidBus branding – consisting of the R1 King George Blvd (the former 96 B-Line), the new R3 Lougheed Hwy, the new R4 41st Ave (replacing the 43 express service along 41st Avenue), and the R5 Hastings St (the former 95 B-Line) – launched on January 6, 2020.

The R2 Marine Drive launched on April 6, 2020, after construction delays, replacing the former 239. The R6 Scott Rd launched on January 2, 2024, with service in Surrey and Delta.

== Features ==
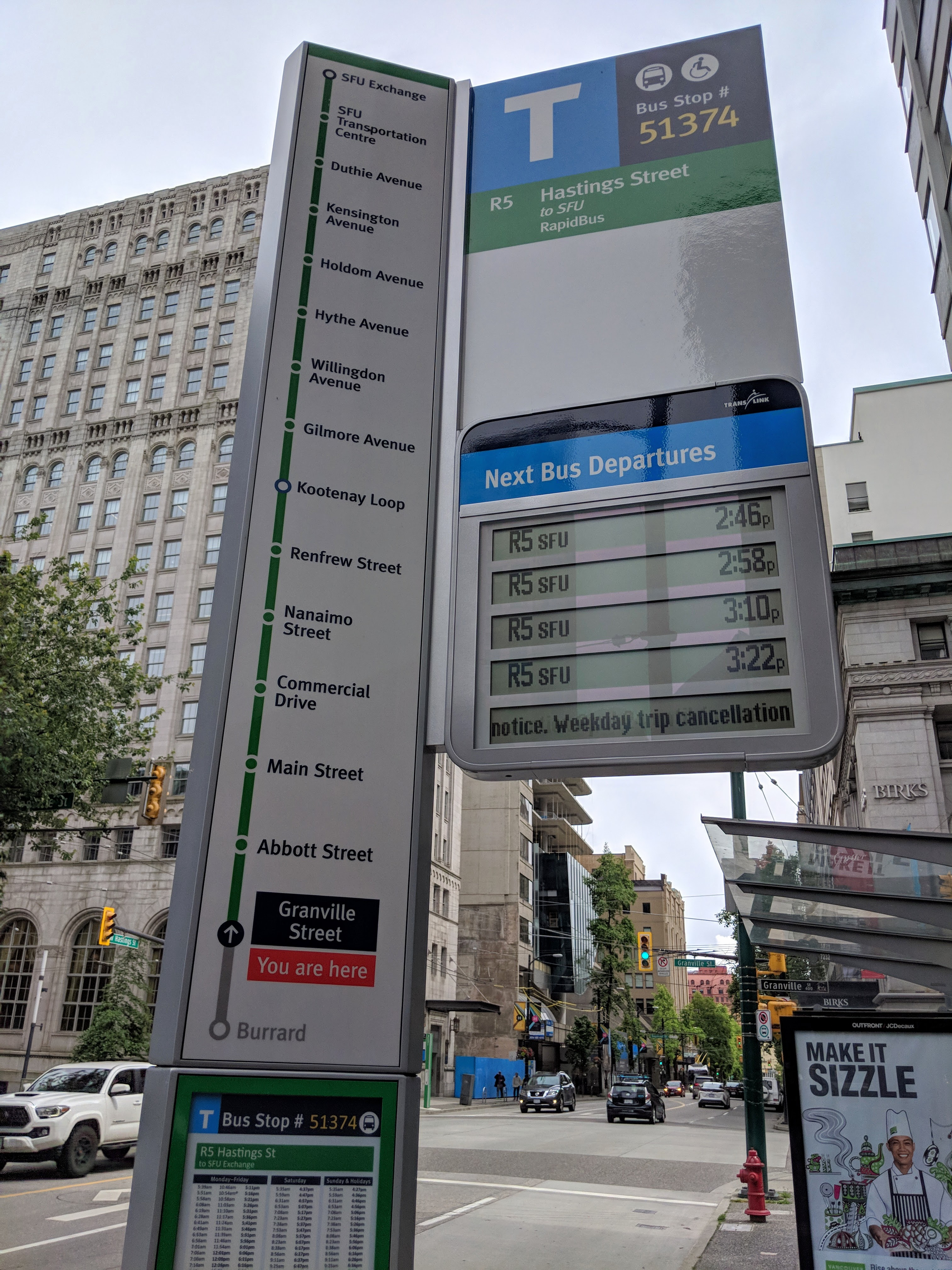
Bus stop with real-time arrival information near Waterfront station

- All-door boarding
- Shelters and benches at stops
- Tactile pads
- Real-time information
- Information panels at stops
- On-board route diagrams
- Transit priority measures on streets to improve travel times
- Custom exterior bus livery
- Frequent service

== RapidBus routes ==
Route	Launch date	Termini		Connections	Stops
R1 King George Blvd	September 2, 2013 (as 96 B-Line)	Guildford Exchange	Newton Exchange	Newton Exchange; Surrey Central; King George; Guildford Exchange	12
R2 Marine–Willingdon	April 6, 2020; Metrotown extension opened September 7, 2026	Metrotown station	Park Royal Exchange	Park Royal Shopping Centre; Lonsdale Quay; Phibbs Exchange; Kootenay Loop; Brentwood Town Centre; Metrotown	18
R3 Lougheed Hwy	January 6, 2020	Coquitlam Central station	Haney Place Exchange	Coquitlam Central; Haney Place	8
R4 41st Ave	September 4, 2000 (as 43 Express)	UBC Exchange	Joyce–Collingwood station	Joyce–Collingwood; Oakridge–41st Avenue; Dunbar Loop; UBC Exchange	17
R5 Hastings St	December 19, 2016 (as 95 B-Line)	Burrard station	SFU Exchange	Burrard; Waterfront; Kootenay Loop; SFU Exchange	16
R6 Scott Rd	January 2, 2024	Scott Road station	Newton Exchange	Scott Road; Scottsdale Exchange; Newton Exchange	13

=== Future phases ===
Route	Launch date	Termini		Connections
Lions Gate	TBD	Stadium–Chinatown station	Lynn Valley Centre	Stadium–Chinatown; Granville; Vancouver City Centre; Burrard; Lonsdale Quay
Victoria Drive	TBD	Downtown	Harrison Loop	Commercial–Broadway
White Rock	TBD	Newton Exchange	White Rock Centre	Newton Exchange; South Surrey Park and Ride; White Rock Centre
Coquitlam to Langley	TBD	Coquitlam Central station	Langley Centre	Coquitlam Central; Maple Meadows; Carvolth Exchange; Langley Centre

== Cancelled RapidBus routes ==
=== Fraser Highway ===
Proposals for a Fraser Highway B-Line were made in 2018 along with what would become the Marine Drive, Lougheed Highway, and 41st Avenue RapidBus routes. However, a decision was made in December of that year to cancel the proposed route (which would have been rebranded as RapidBus) in favour of a revision of service on routes 502 and 503 in the short term, and an extension of the Expo Line from Surrey to Langley Centre in the long term.

=== R7 Richmond – Metrotown station ===
This line was cancelled in October 2023 following the rejection of a proposed route by Richmond's city council. The R7 route would have roughly followed the existing 430 route via Bridgeport Road, the Knight Street Bridge, and 49th Avenue.

== Bus rapid transit lines ==
TransLink intends to implement 9 bus rapid transit (BRT) lines in the coming decade, including 3 that will be upgraded from RapidBus, contingent on funding from senior levels of government. The lines will feature all-day frequent service with limited stops, near-continuous dedicated lanes and signal priority at major intersections, high-capacity buses with all-door boarding. The lines will have "rail-like" stations with next-bus departure screens, transit maps and weather protection.

=== Future phases ===
Route	Launch date	Termini		Connection
King George Boulevard BRT	TBD	Surrey Central station	White Rock Centre	Surrey Central; King George; Newton Exchange; South Surrey Park and Ride; White Rock Centre
Langley – Haney Place BRT	TBD	Haney Place Exchange	Willowbrook station	Haney Place Exchange; Carvolth Exchange; Willowbrook
Metrotown – North Shore BRT	TBD	Park Royal Exchange	Metrotown station	Park Royal Exchange; Lonsdale Quay; Phibbs Exchange; Kootenay Loop; Brentwood Town Centre; BCIT Exchange; Metrotown

== See also ==
- List of bus routes in Metro Vancouver
- RapidRide, a similar system in the Seattle area
