= R1 King George Blvd =

Express bus service in Metro Vancouver, Canada

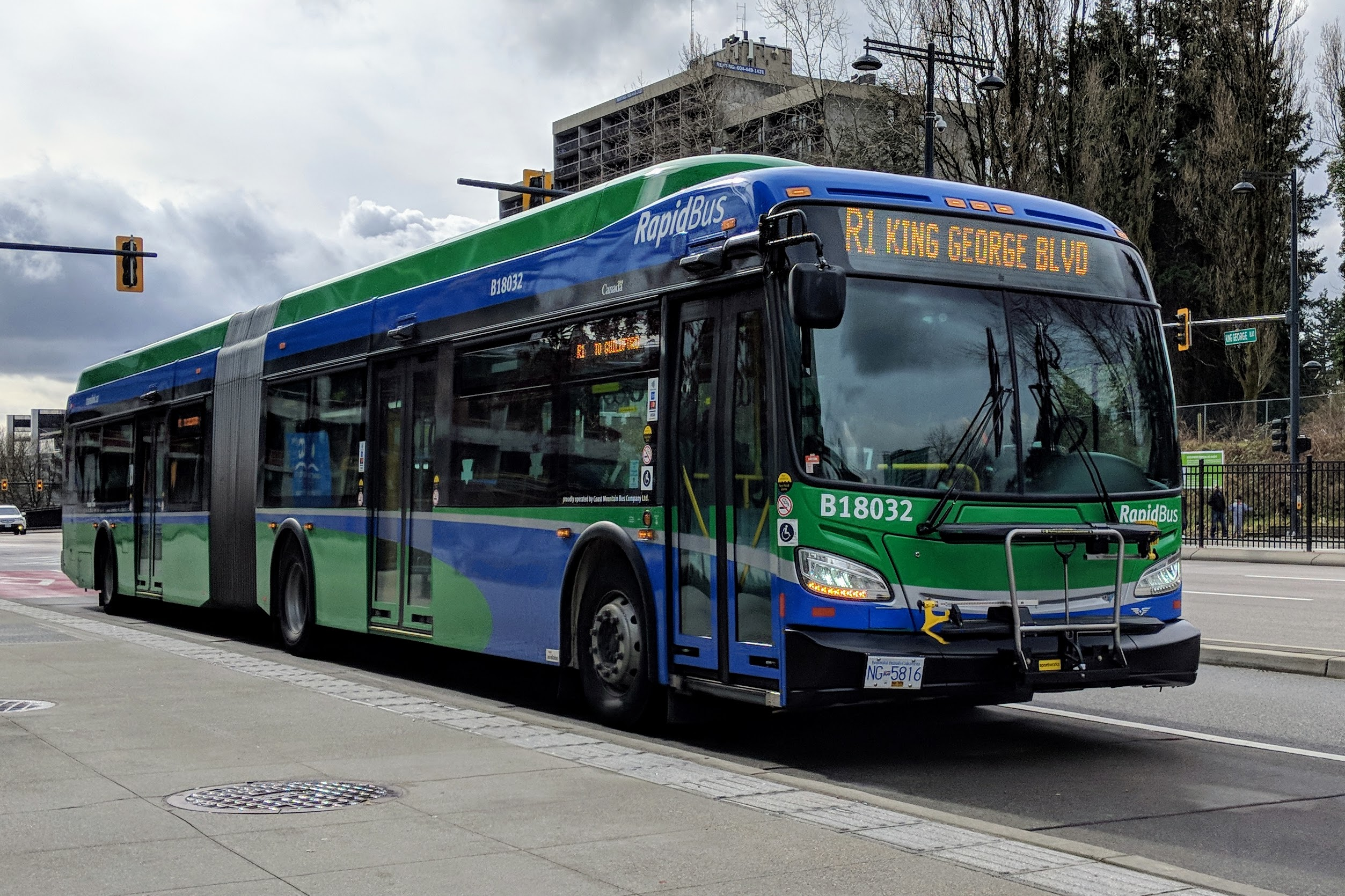
- An R1 King George Blvd at King George station

Overview
- System: TransLink
- Operator: Coast Mountain Bus Company
- Began service: September 2, 2013 (as 96 B-Line)

Route
- Start: Guildford Exchange
- End: Newton Exchange
- Length: 10.4 km (6.5 mi)
- Stops: 12

Service
- Ridership: 13,940 (avg. weekday; 2025)
Route map
R1 King George Blvd highlighted in green
Key

The R1 King George Blvd is an express bus service with bus rapid transit elements in Metro Vancouver, British Columbia, Canada. Part of TransLink's RapidBus network, it travels along King George Boulevard and 104 Avenue in Surrey and connects Guildford, Whalley / City Centre, and Newton. The service replaced the 96 B-Line on January 6, 2020. It is operated by Coast Mountain Bus Company and funded by TransLink.

All articulated buses used on this route are hybrid and air-conditioned. Although articulated buses are mainly assigned, standard buses may be assigned instead.

== History ==
Origins of what became the 96 B-Line can be traced back to 2008–2009, when the route was known as the 399 in planning stages. Originally planned for a 2010 implementation using resources from the 98 B-Line, which was slated to be discontinued, implementation of a south of the Fraser River B-Line did not happen until four years later due to a funding shortfall.

The line began service on September 2, 2013. Continuous queue jumping lanes were subsequently added at major intersections along King George Boulevard and the City of Surrey proposed expanding bus-only lanes along King George Blvd to improve travel times.

Since January 1, 2018, passengers with a Compass Card or proof of payment are allowed to board from any of the three doors on the bus. Passengers who are paying cash must board through the front door.

On January 6, 2020, the 96 B-Line service was replaced by new R1 King George Blvd RapidBus, which featured upgraded passenger amenities such as improved bus shelters and a new passenger information system.

The R1 King George Blvd RapidBus was the 7th busiest bus route in TransLink's network in 2025, with 4,610,000 total boardings.

== Route description ==
Departing from Guildford Exchange, the R1 travels west along 104 Avenue towards Surrey Central station and King George station (both on the SkyTrain Expo Line). It then continues south along King George Boulevard towards Newton Exchange.

=== Stops ===
- Guildford Exchange – serves Guildford Town Centre and Guildford Recreation Centre. It is a major transfer point for other routes serving Surrey, Langley, and White Rock.
- 148 Street
- 144 Street – serves Hawthorne Rotary Park
- 140 Street
- Whalley Boulevard
- Surrey Central station – connects to the Expo Line and also serves Central City, SFU Surrey, KPU Civic Plaza, the Surrey City Centre Public Library and Surrey City Hall. Also a major transfer point for other routes serving Surrey, Langley, Aldergrove, Delta, and White Rock.
- King George station – connects to the Expo Line and serves Holland Park and King George Hub
- 96 Avenue – serves Surrey Memorial Hospital and Queen Elizabeth Secondary School
- 88 Avenue – serves Bear Creek Park and the Surrey Arts Centre
- 80 Avenue
- 76 Avenue – serves Kings Cross shopping plaza as well as other retail
- Newton Exchange – serves Newton Town Centre and is a major transfer point for other local services to Surrey, Langley and White Rock and express service to Richmond

== See also ==
- 97 B-Line
- 98 B-Line
- 99 B-Line
- Surrey LRT
- List of bus routes in Metro Vancouver
