= Guildford, British Columbia =

Guildford
- Town centre
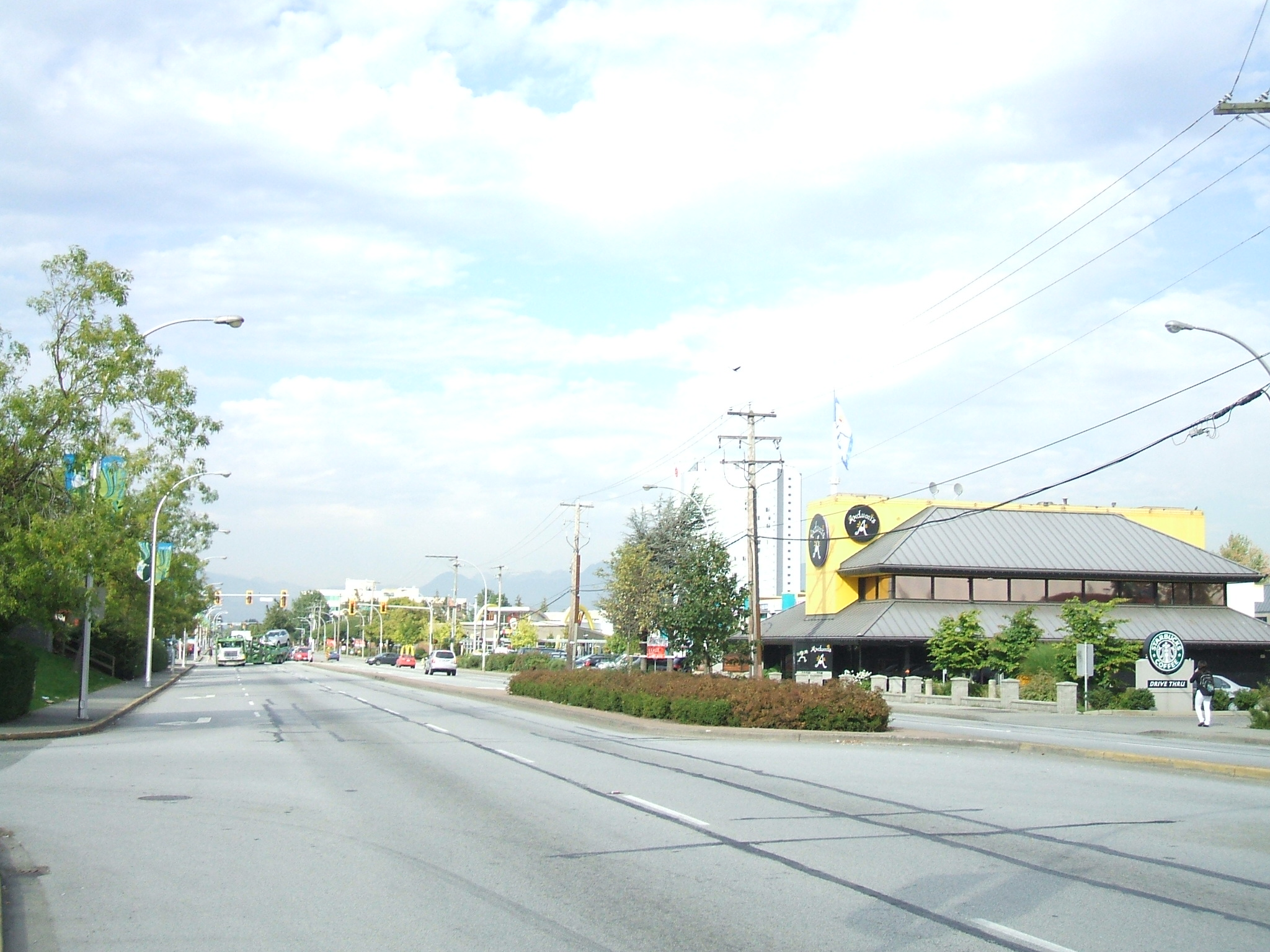
- North-facing view of Guildford on 152 Street

- Location of Guildford within Metro Vancouver
- Coordinates: 49.19°N 122.80°W
- Country: Canada
- Province: British Columbia
- Region: Lower Mainland
- Regional district: Metro Vancouver
- City: Surrey

Government
  - Mayor: Brenda Locke
  - MP (Fed.): Ken Hardie (Liberal); Randeep Sarai (Liberal)
  - MLA (Prov.): Garry Begg (NDP)

Population (2016)
  - Total: 60,745
- Time zone: UTC−8 (PST)
  - Summer (DST): UTC−7 (PDT)

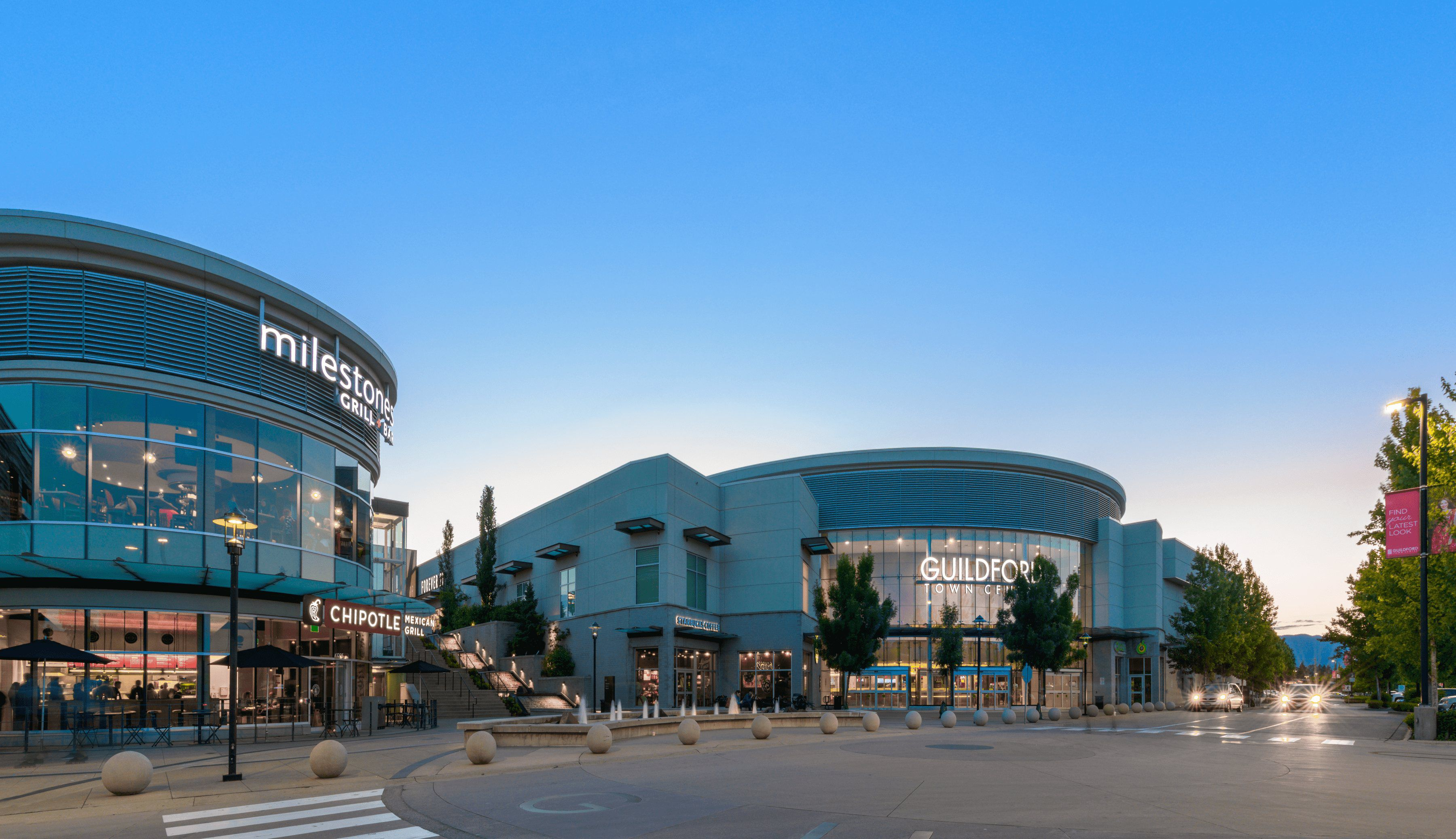
Guildford Town Centre

Guildford is a town centre and neighbourhood of Surrey, British Columbia, Canada. It is known for its retail corridors along 104 Avenue and 152 Street. At the intersection of these two streets sits the 200-store Guildford Town Centre shopping mall. The community is named after Guildford in Surrey, England.

Although Guildford is geographically large, the Guildford neighbourhood is locally considered to centre around the Guildford Town Centre mall and its surrounding blocks. A notable landmark in Guildford is the 86-metre (282 ft) tall flagpole, which had been located at the Expo 86 fairgrounds and was then the record holder for world's tallest flagpole. It is also home to the Guildford Recreation Centre, which is owned and operated by the City of Surrey to serve the recreational needs of local residents.

As of the 2016 census, the population of Guildford is 60,745.

== Geography ==
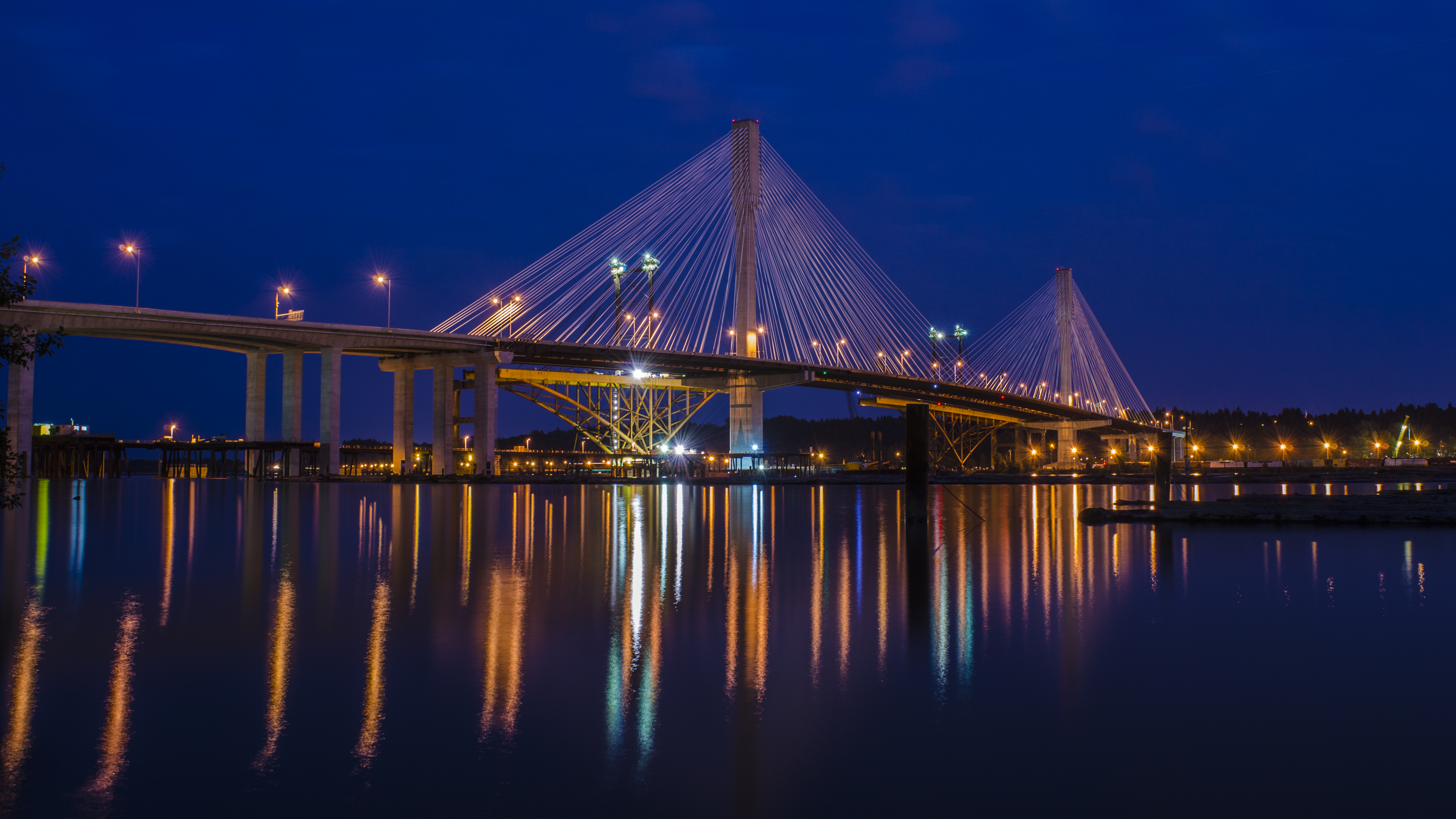
Port Mann Bridge crossing the Fraser River

Guildford occupies the northeastern corner of the city of Surrey with its northern border the shores of the Fraser River, its western border extending to roughly 144th Street and the east adjoining the city of Langley at 196th Street. Its southern border with the neighbourhood of Fleetwood extends roughly to 96th Avenue while its southern border with the neighbourhood of Cloverdale extends to roughly 84th and 80th Avenue. Additionally, BC Highway 1 passes through the neighbourhood from east to west, with a major crossing over the Fraser River at the Port Mann Bridge.

== Demographics ==
Ethnic groups in Guildford (2016)		%
Ethnic group	European	39%
Ethnic group	Chinese	16%
Ethnic group	South Asian	12%
Ethnic group	Filipino	11%
Ethnic group	Aboriginal	3%
Ethnic group	Other	19%
Total %		100%

Languages spoken in Guildford (2016)		%
Language	English	65%
Language	Mandarin	10%
Language	Tagalog	4%
Language	Korean	4%
Language	Punjabi	3%
Language	Other	14%
Total %		100%

== See also ==
- Guildford Exchange
- Surrey-Whalley provincial electoral district
- List of largest enclosed shopping malls in Canada
