= Guildford Town Centre =

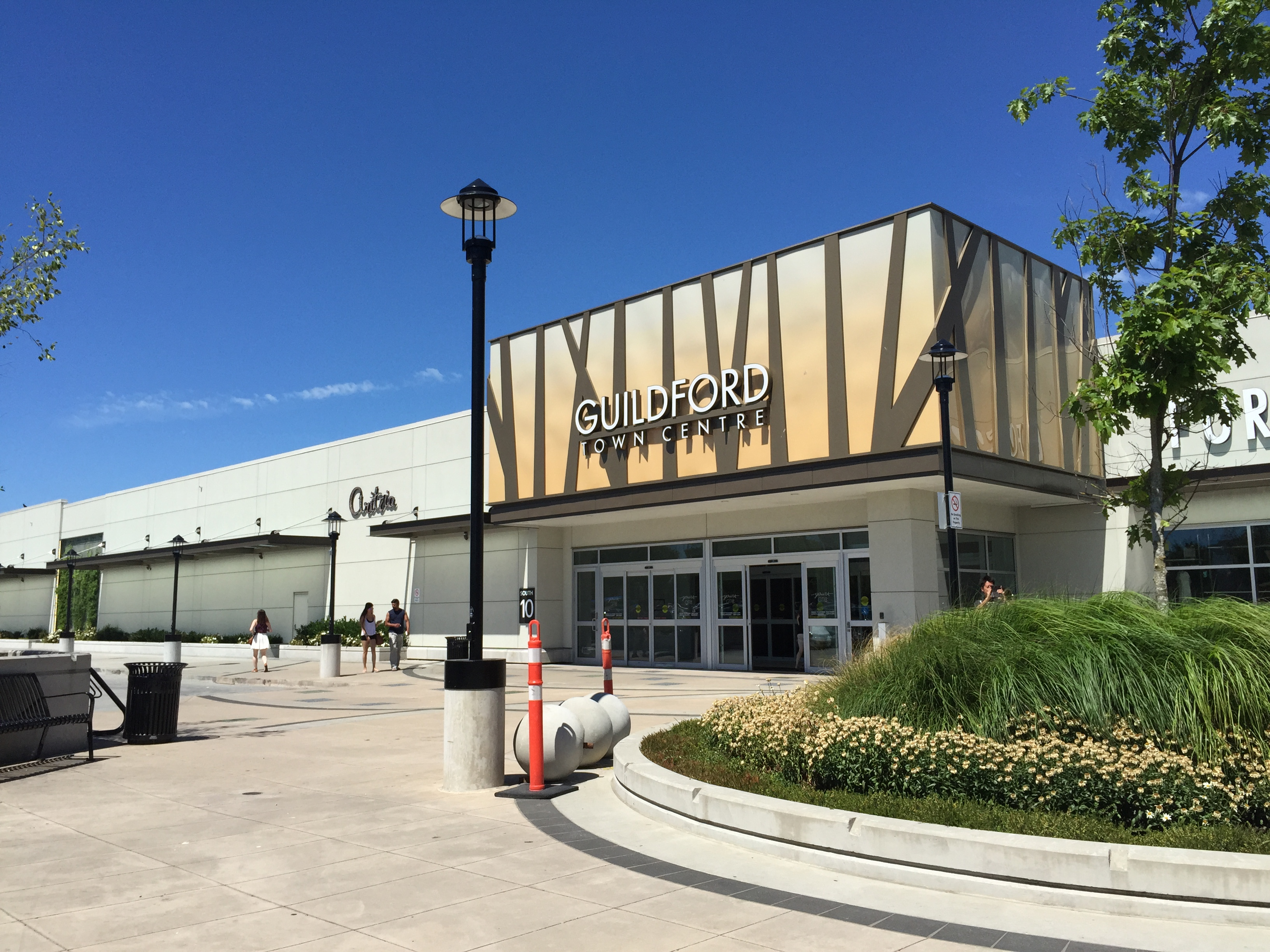
- Guildford Town Centre from the south
- Coordinates: 49.189994°N 122.803671°W
- Address: 10355 152 Street; Surrey, British Columbia, Canada
- Opened: November 8, 1966
- Manager: Ivanhoé Cambridge
- Owner: Ivanhoé Cambridge (50%); JLL (50%)
- Num. of stores: 250+
- Num. of anchor tenants: 8
- Floor area: 111,816.6 m^{2} (1,203,584 sq ft)
- Floors: 2
- Parking: Yes
- Public transit: Guildford Exchange; R1 King George Blvd
- Website: www.guildfordtowncentre.com

Guildford Town Centre is a shopping mall located in Surrey, British Columbia, Canada. It opened on November 8, 1966, and is owned by Ivanhoé Cambridge, a Quebec-based real estate company. It is the largest mall in the Lower Mainland south of the Fraser River as well as the third-largest in British Columbia, after Metropolis at Metrotown in Burnaby and Park Royal Shopping Centre in West Vancouver.

The shopping centre has over 250 stores, services, and restaurants with a gross leasable area of 111,816.6 square metres (1,203,584 sq ft) and its anchors include Walmart, Life InStyle Furniture (Former Level 2 of Sears), Urban Behavior/Thriftys by Bluenotes (former level 1 of Sears), London Drugs, Old Navy, Uniqlo, and Sport Chek. For its 50th anniversary in 2016, it attempted to set the Guinness World Record for the world's largest carrot cake.

== Redevelopment ==
A three-phase redevelopment project began in June 2010. The first phase, completed on October 28, 2011, included a brand new Walmart Supercentre and two-level parkade. The second and third phases resulted in the complete refurbishment of the centre's interior and the construction of a 19,000-square-metre (200,000 sq ft) expansion on the south side of the existing building to accommodate a 1,034-seat food court and 75 new stores. The expansion opened on August 28, 2013, while the rest of the project was completed in the fourth quarter of 2014.

== Movie theatre ==
There is a 12-screen movie theatre operated by Landmark Cinemas. On October 29, 2013, Empire Theatres closed the theatre; it was re-opened on October 31, 2013, by Landmark Cinemas. It was run by Famous Players from its opening in 1986 as a four-screen cinema. Major renovations took place throughout 1998, until it opened in November of that year under the SilverCity brand. Famous Players operated this theatre until September 30, 2005, when Cineplex Entertainment was required to sell this theatre.

== Transportation ==
Guildford Town Centre is served by 12 bus routes from all over the city as the Guildford Exchange transit centre is located under a section of the mall that is structurally built over the 104 Avenue thoroughfare. The formerly proposed Surrey LRT would have seen a light rail station terminating at Guildford Town Centre; however, the project was indefinitely suspended following a resolution passed by the Surrey City Council in 2018 which favoured a SkyTrain Expo Line extension further into Surrey.

== Gallery ==
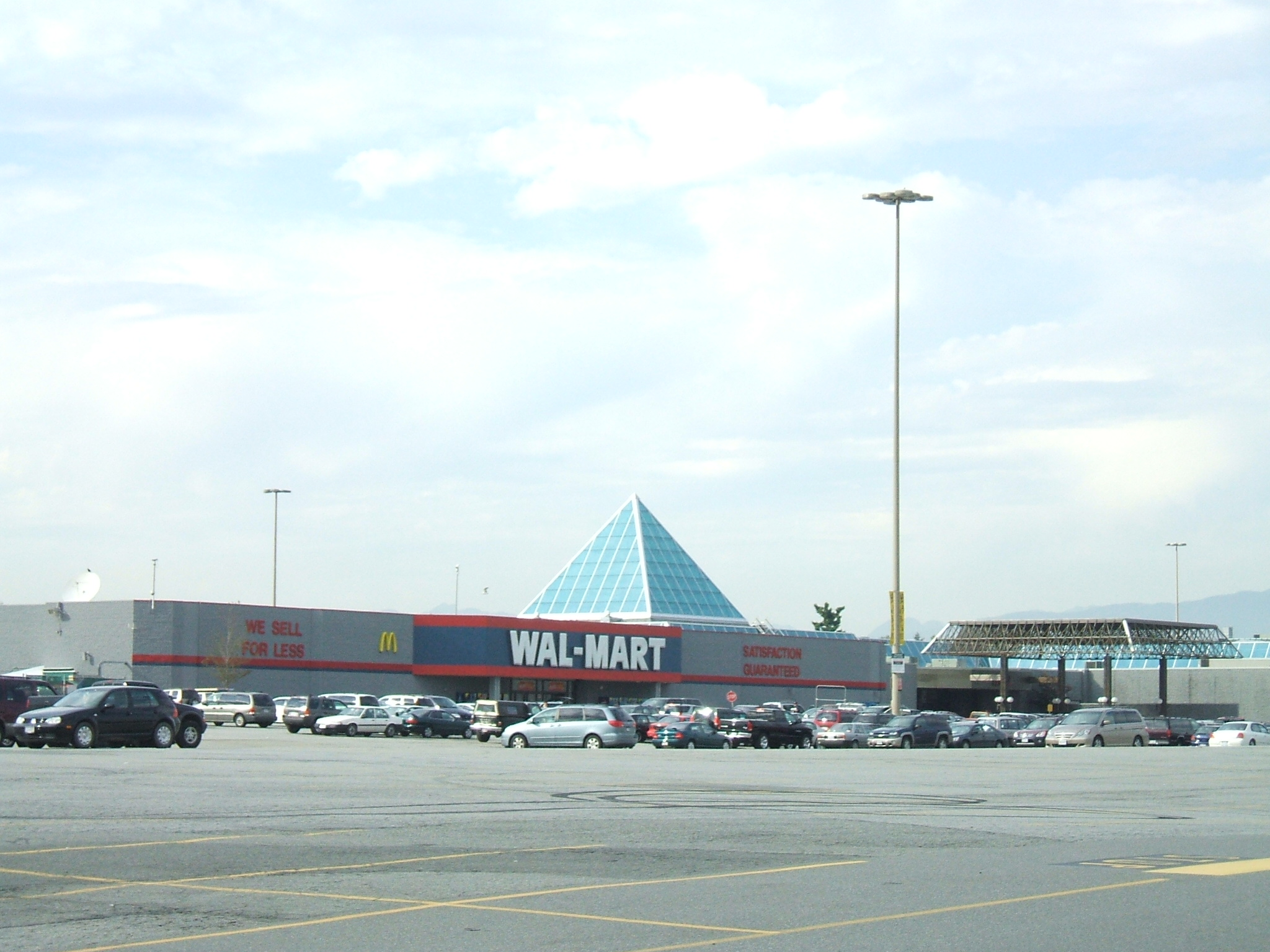
Guildford Town Centre prior to the re-development

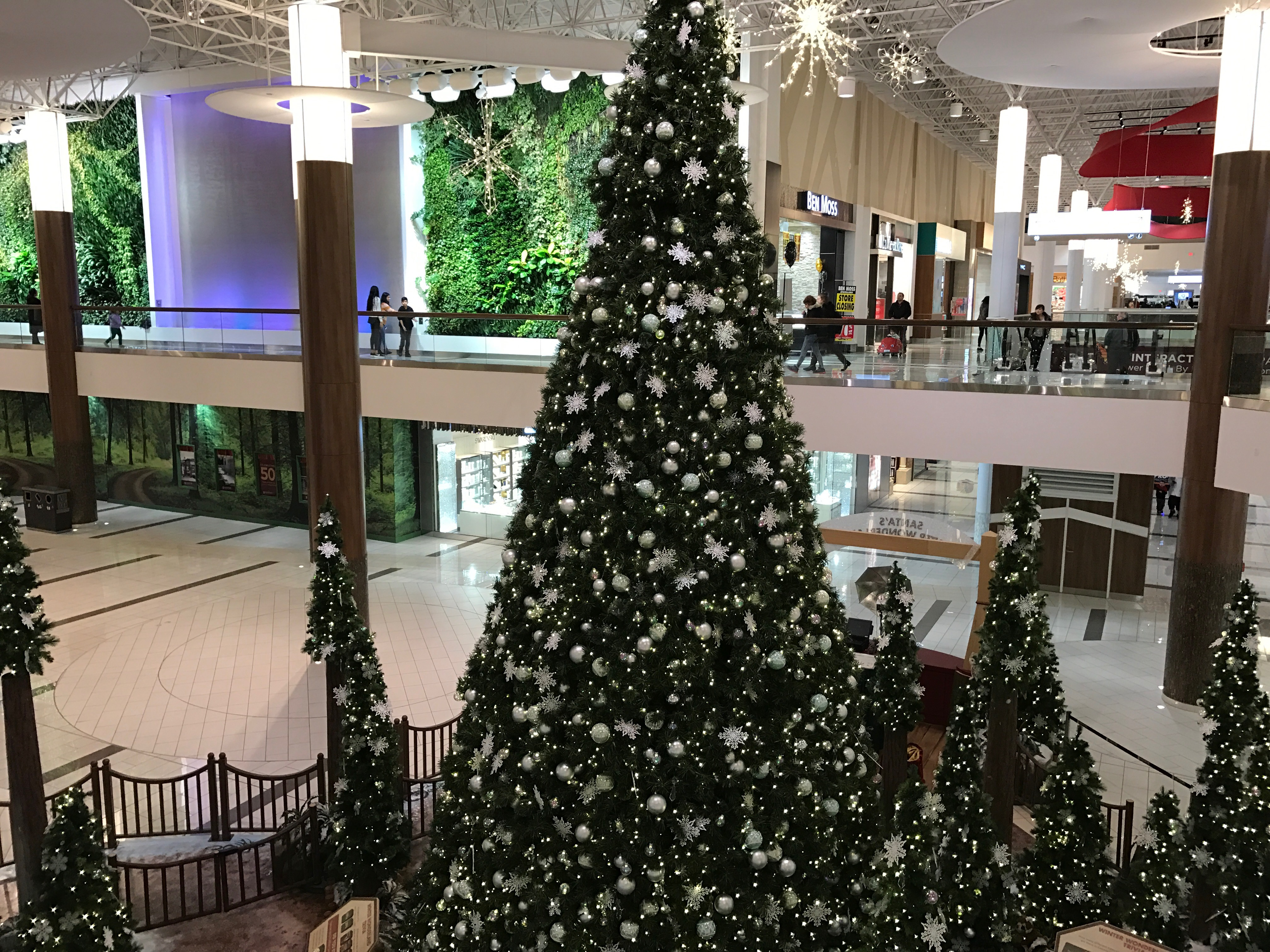
Interior decorations during Christmas

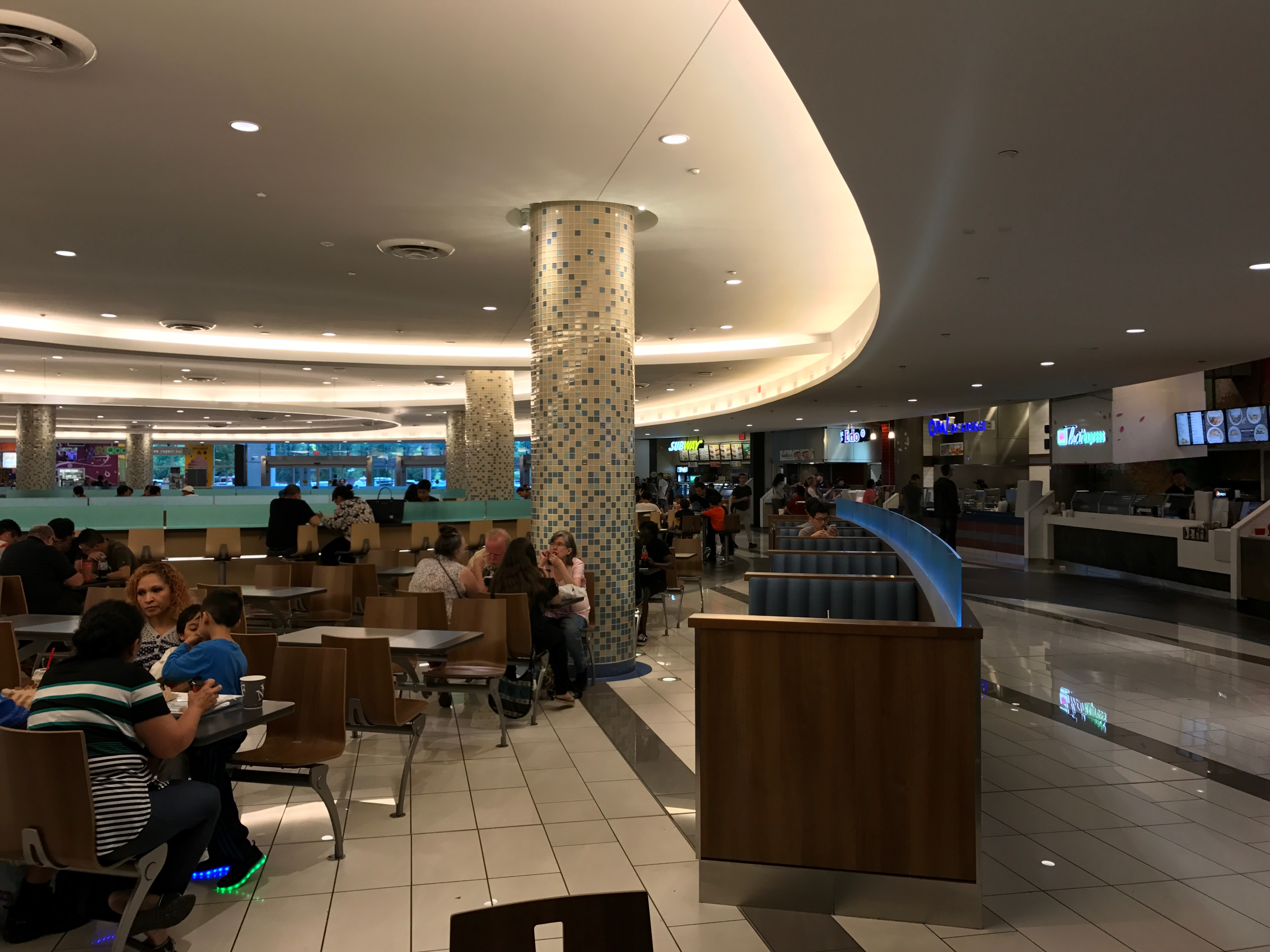
Food court

== See also ==
- List of largest enclosed shopping malls in Canada
