= Newton Exchange =

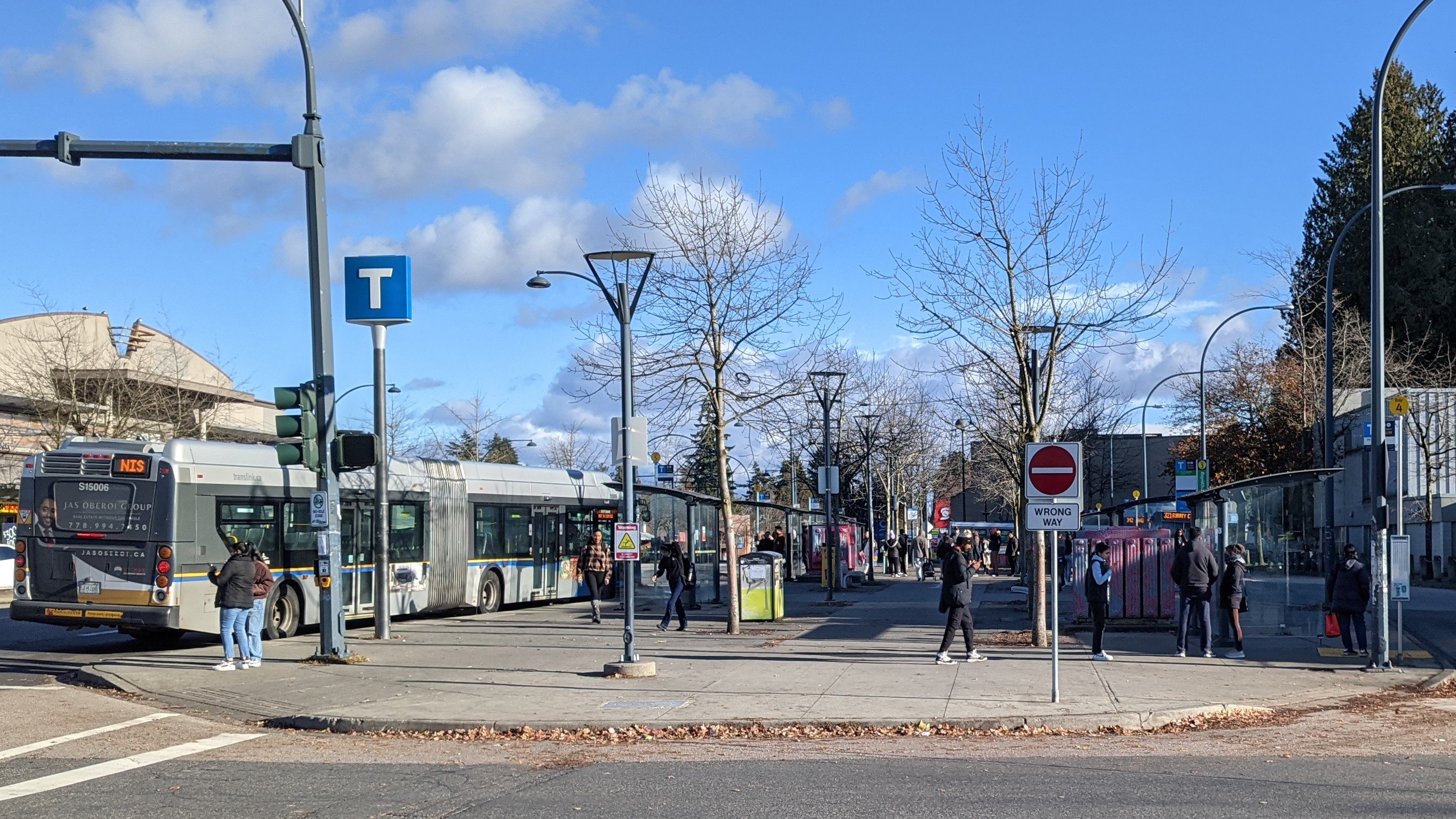
- Looking east at Newton Exchange

General information
- Location: 72 Avenue and 137 Street; Surrey, British Columbia; Canada
- Coordinates: 49°08′00″N 122°50′32″W
- Operator: TransLink
- Bus routes: 14
- Bus stands: 12
- Bus operators: Coast Mountain Bus Company
- Connections: R1 King George Blvd; R6 Scott Rd

Other information
- Fare zone: 3

History
- Opened: May 30, 1975; 51 years ago
- Rebuilt: 1986, 2013; 13 years ago
Location

Newton Exchange is a bus loop located in the central Newton area of Surrey, British Columbia, Canada. As part of the TransLink system, it serves Newton with routes to Surrey City Centre, North Delta, Richmond, Langley City and White Rock, which provide connections to several SkyTrain stations for travel towards Vancouver.

== Structure and location ==
The exchange opened on May 30, 1975, and is located on the southeast corner of 72 Avenue and 137 Street; it has a loop layout with several shelters. It was rebuilt in 1986 and again in 2013 to improve efficiency and to accommodate the introduction of the 96 B-Line service.

Newton Exchange is adjacent to the Newton Wave Pool. There are also several retail outlets located nearby, including King's Cross retail outlet. There is a civic recreation centre and library located south of the facility. The bus loop is patrolled by the Metro Vancouver Transit Police.

== Routes ==
As of January 2024, the following routes serve Newton Exchange:

Bay	Location	Route	Notes
1	Bus loop	342 Langley Centre; 393 Surrey Central Station	
2	Bus loop	321 Surrey Central Station; 394 King George Station	
3	Bus loop	R1 King George Blvd to Guildford	RapidBus service
4	Bus loop	319 Scott Road Station	
5	Bus loop	Unloading only	
6	Bus loop	324 Surrey Central Station; 325 Surrey Central Station	
7	Bus loop	335 Surrey Central Station	Via Guildford
7	Bus loop	341 Guildford	
8	Bus loop	R6 Scott Rd to Scott Road Station	RapidBus service
9	137 Street; Northbound	322 Scottsdale	
10	71A Avenue; Eastbound	301 Brighouse Station	Express
11	72 Avenue; Eastbound	323 Surrey Central Station	
12	72 Avenue; Eastbound	321 White Rock Centre; 394 White Rock Centre	
