= Surrey City Centre Public Library =

City Centre Library, Surrey Libraries
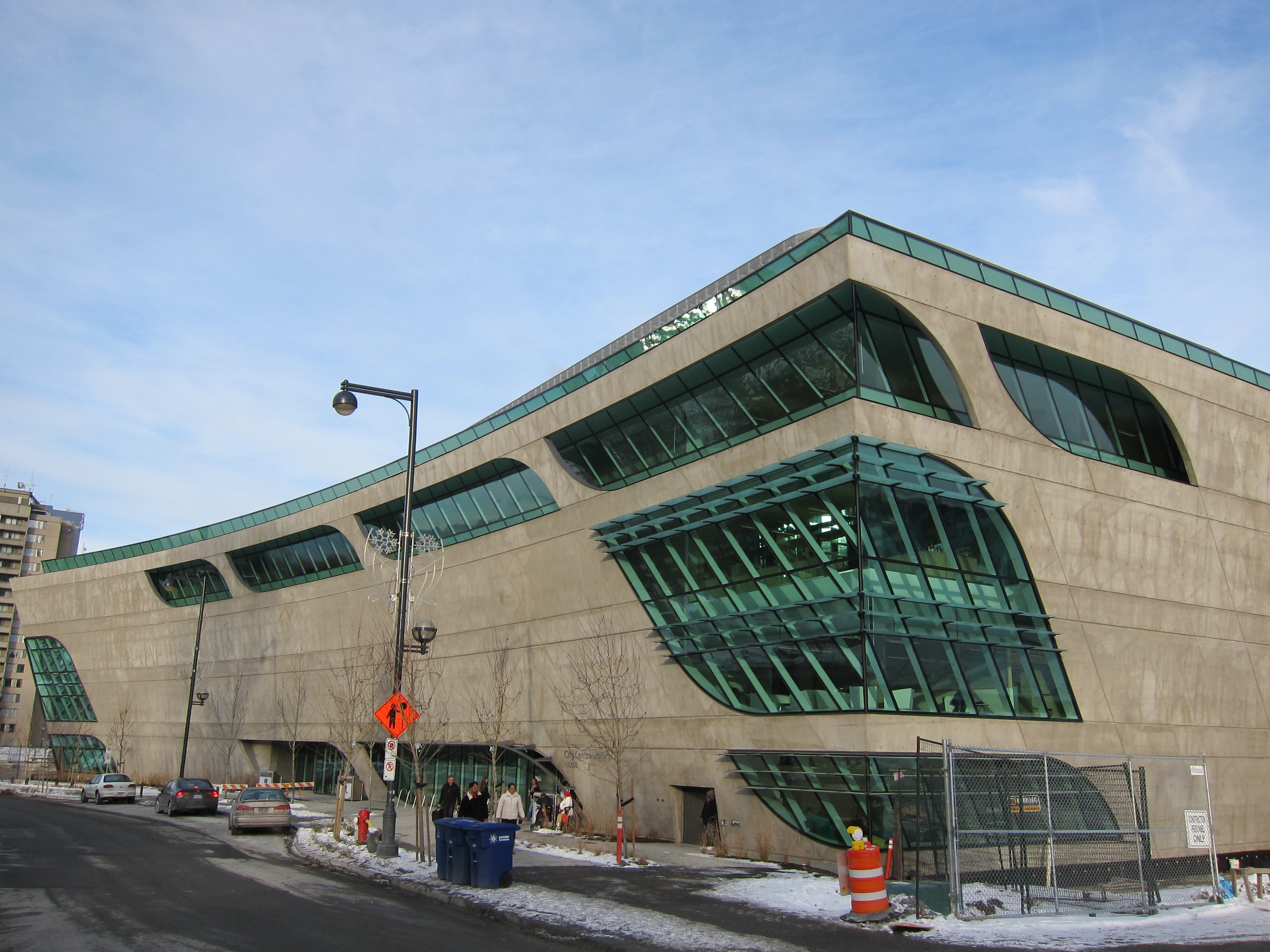
- Exterior of the SW corner of the Surrey City Centre Library
- 49.19057°N 122.84936°W
- Location: Surrey, British Columbia, Canada
- Type: Public
- Established: 2011
- Architect: Bing Thom Architects
- Branch of: Surrey Libraries

Collection
- Size: 100,000 items

Access and use
- Circulation: 341,094

Other information
- Director: Surinder Bhogal, Chief Librarian
- Public transit access: Surrey Central Station
- Website: City Centre Library

The Surrey City Centre Library is the main branch of Surrey Libraries (Surrey, British Columbia's public library system). It was opened in September 2011 and replaced the Whalley Public Library. Part of a re-vitalization project for the City Centre area, the building was designed by Bing Thom. The library is located northwest of Surrey Central station in the Whalley / City Centre neighbourhood.

== Planning and construction ==
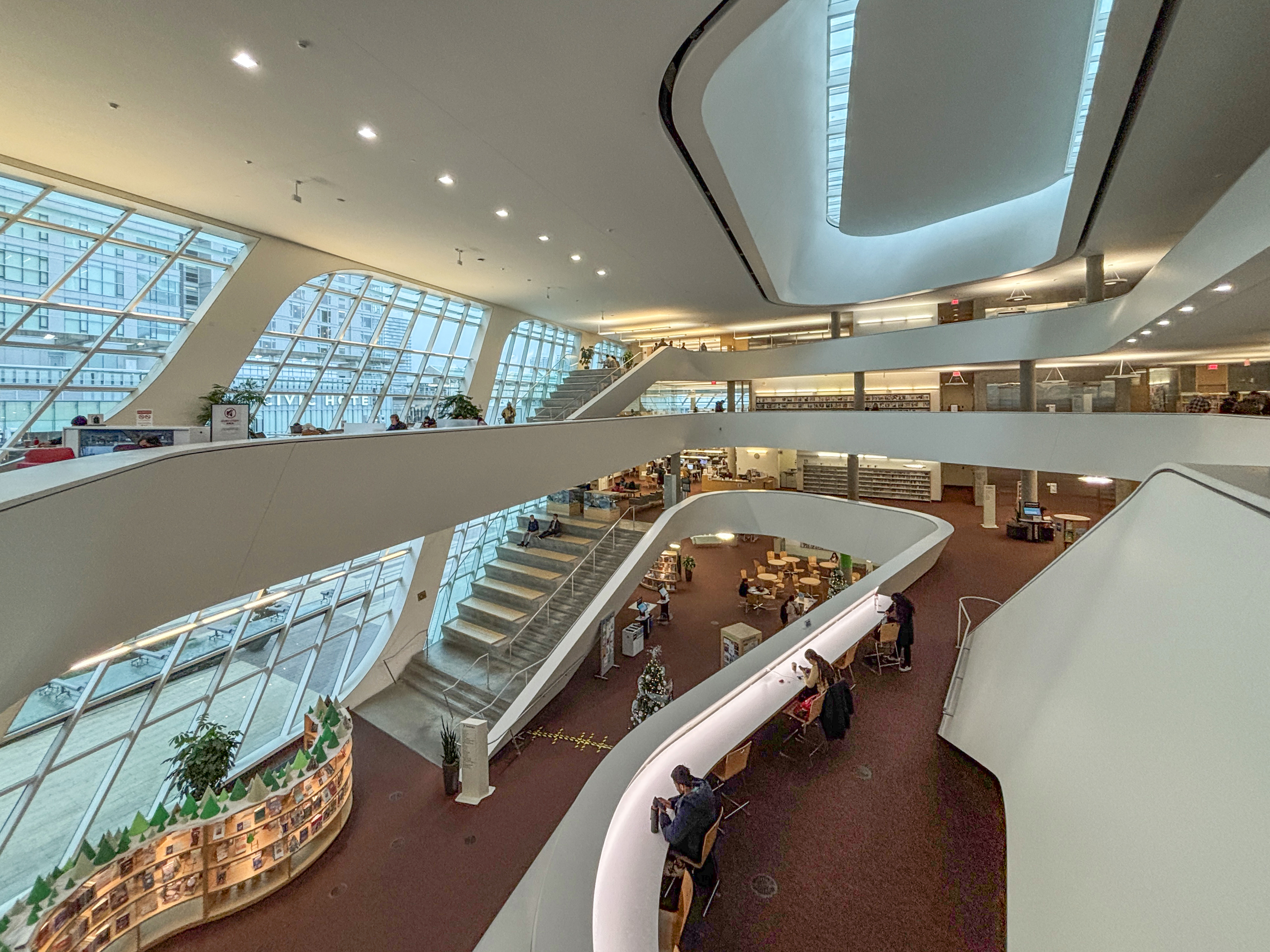
Main atrium

Part of a long-term re-vitalization effort by the City of Surrey, dubbed "Build Surrey", the City Centre branch library project was launched in 2009. It replaced the Whalley Public Library. The library is part of complex including the City Centre shopping and education complex, a performing arts centre, and City Hall. The design was awarded to Bing Thom Architects, who had designed the nearby City Centre complex as well as Vancouver-area buildings such as the University of British Columbia's Chan Centre. The total budget was set at $36 million; the provincial and federal governments each contributed $10 million with the remainder supplied by the city. It is LEED Gold certified.

Faced with a short public consultation period, the architects used social media to gain input from the community. Through Facebook, Twitter, and a blog, respondents compiled an "ideasbook" of desired elements. Construction finished in the summer of 2011, and the branch was opened to the public in September of that year. The branch is located by the Surrey Central skytrain station.

== Facilities ==
The library has 7,200 square metres (78,000 sq ft) of usable space spread over four floors. Its 100,000-item collection of print materials is modest for a large urban library; the library is focused on community services such as language programs for Surrey's large immigrant population, youth and adult programs, and computer access. The library features non-traditional facilities like a cafe, an iPad station for children, a meditation room (which also serves as a prayer room), and bookable study room spaces.

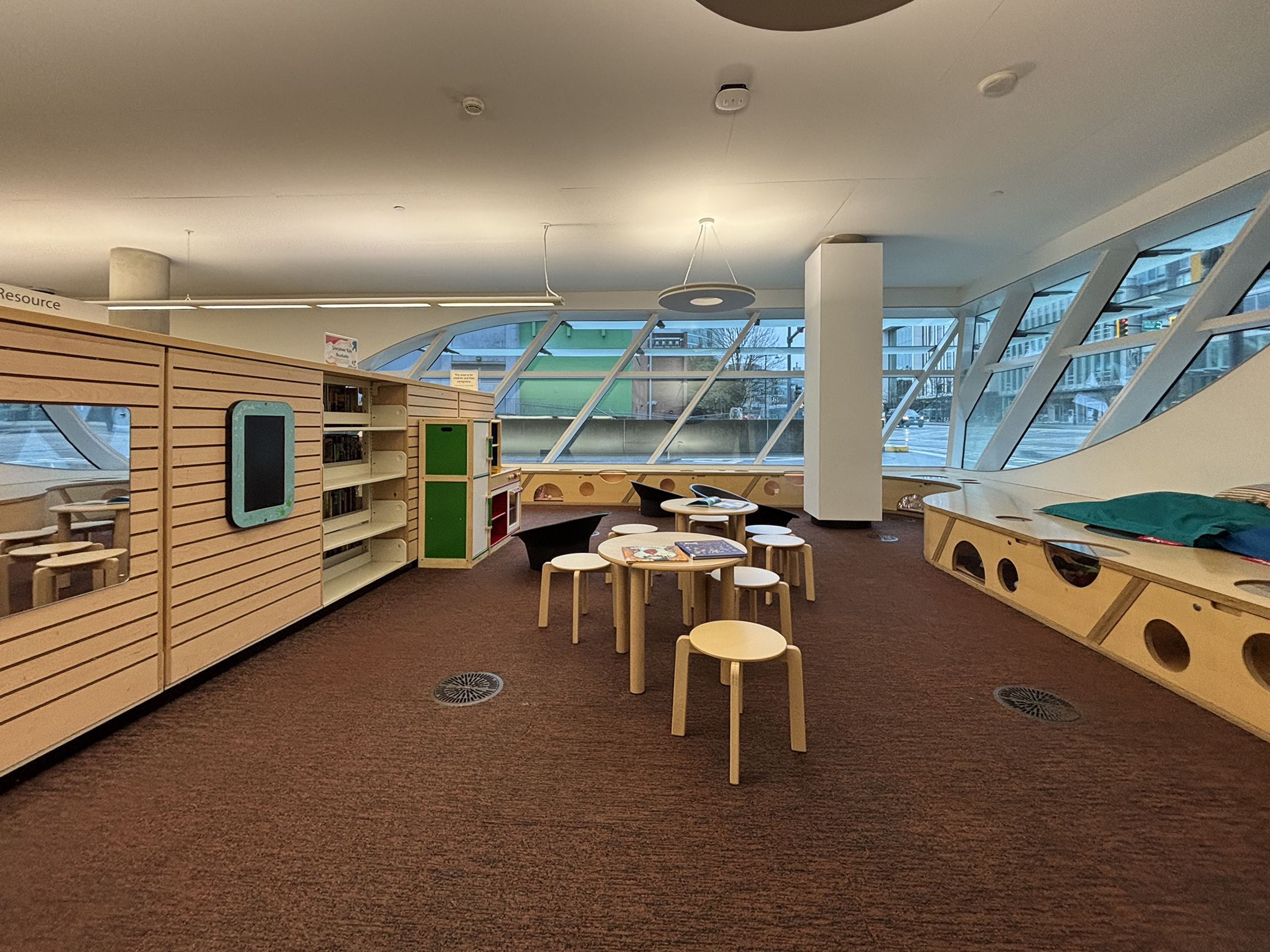
Level 1 Children Library

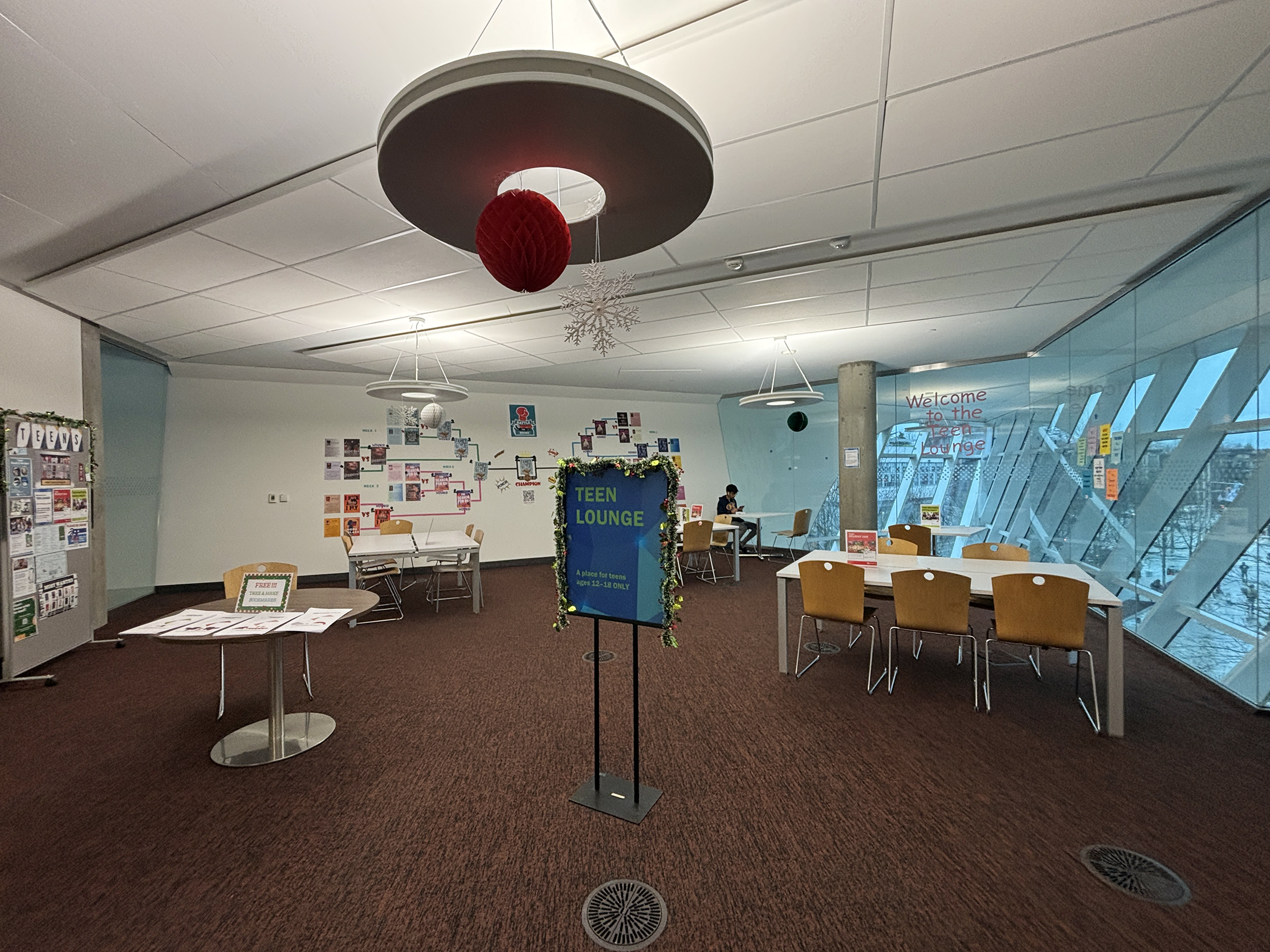
Level 3 Teen Lounge

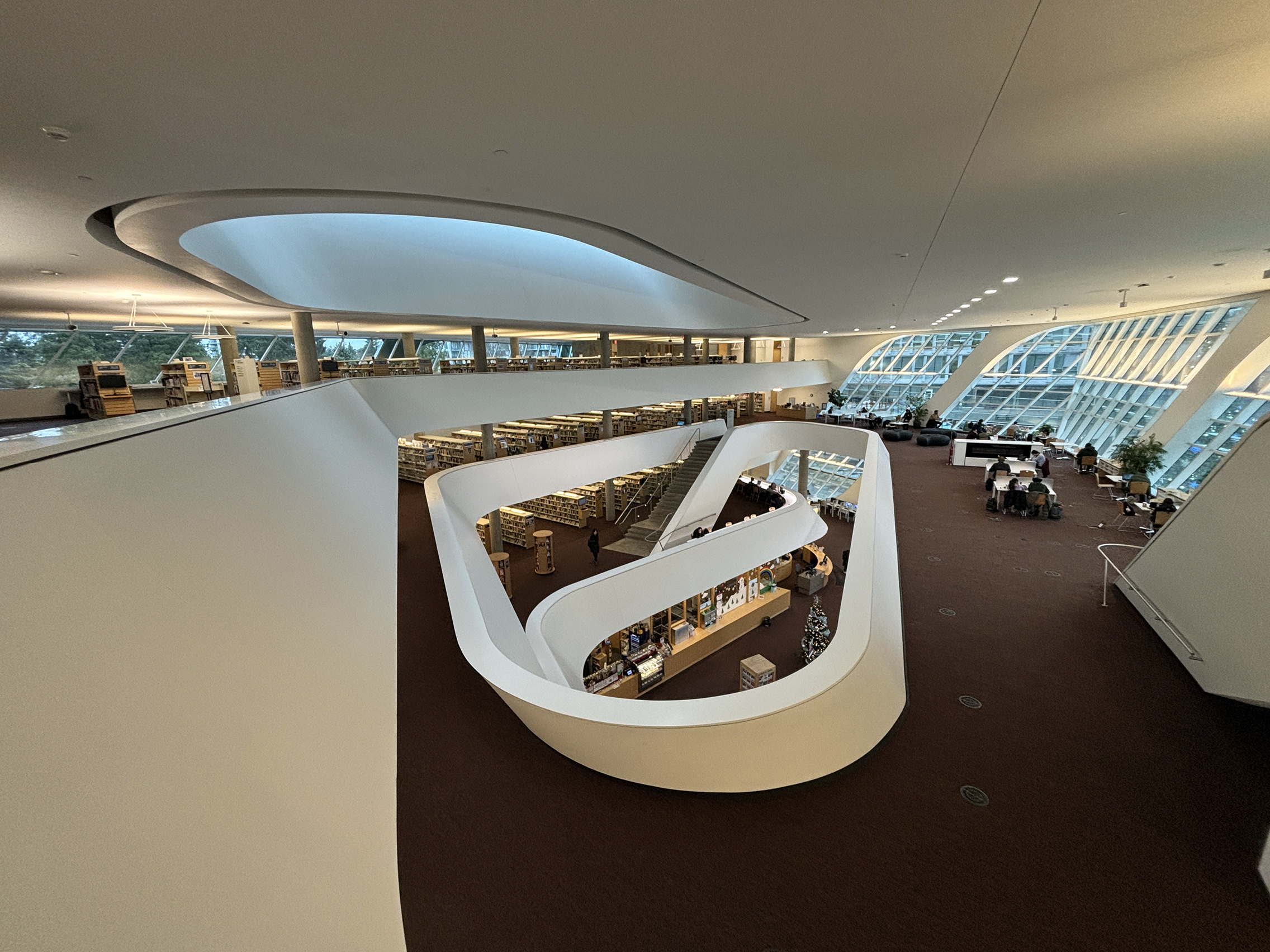
Library interior

== Appearance in media ==
Surrey Central Library appears in the following media:

- Disney Channel Original Movie “Tru Confessions” starring Shia LaBeouf
- City-building computer game Cities: Skylines as a "Grand Library"
- TV series Continuum: Season 4, Episode 5 as a "Piron Labs"
- Supergirl: Season 2, Episode 6 as "National City Art Gallery"
- TV series Travelers: Season 1, Episode 1
- Everything, Everything as a library
- Adventures in Babysitting (2016) as a library
