= Surrey Central station =

Metro Vancouver SkyTrain station

Surrey Central
- Surrey Central's north stationhouse on City Parkway

General information
- Location: 10277 City Parkway; Surrey, British Columbia; Canada
- Coordinates: 49°11′22″N 122°50′52″W
- System: SkyTrain station
- Owner: TransLink
- Platforms: Centre platform
- Tracks: 2
- Connections: R1 King George Blvd

Construction
- Structure type: Elevated
- Accessible: yes

Other information
- Station code: SC
- Fare zone: 3

History
- Opened: March 28, 1994; 32 years ago
- Rebuilt: 2017–2019; 7 years ago
- Former names: Whalley Central (planning)

Passengers
- 2025: 5,086,000 ▼15.3%
- Rank: 6 of 54

Services
Preceding station	TransLink	Following station
Gateway towards Waterfront	Expo Line Surrey branch	King George Terminus
Location

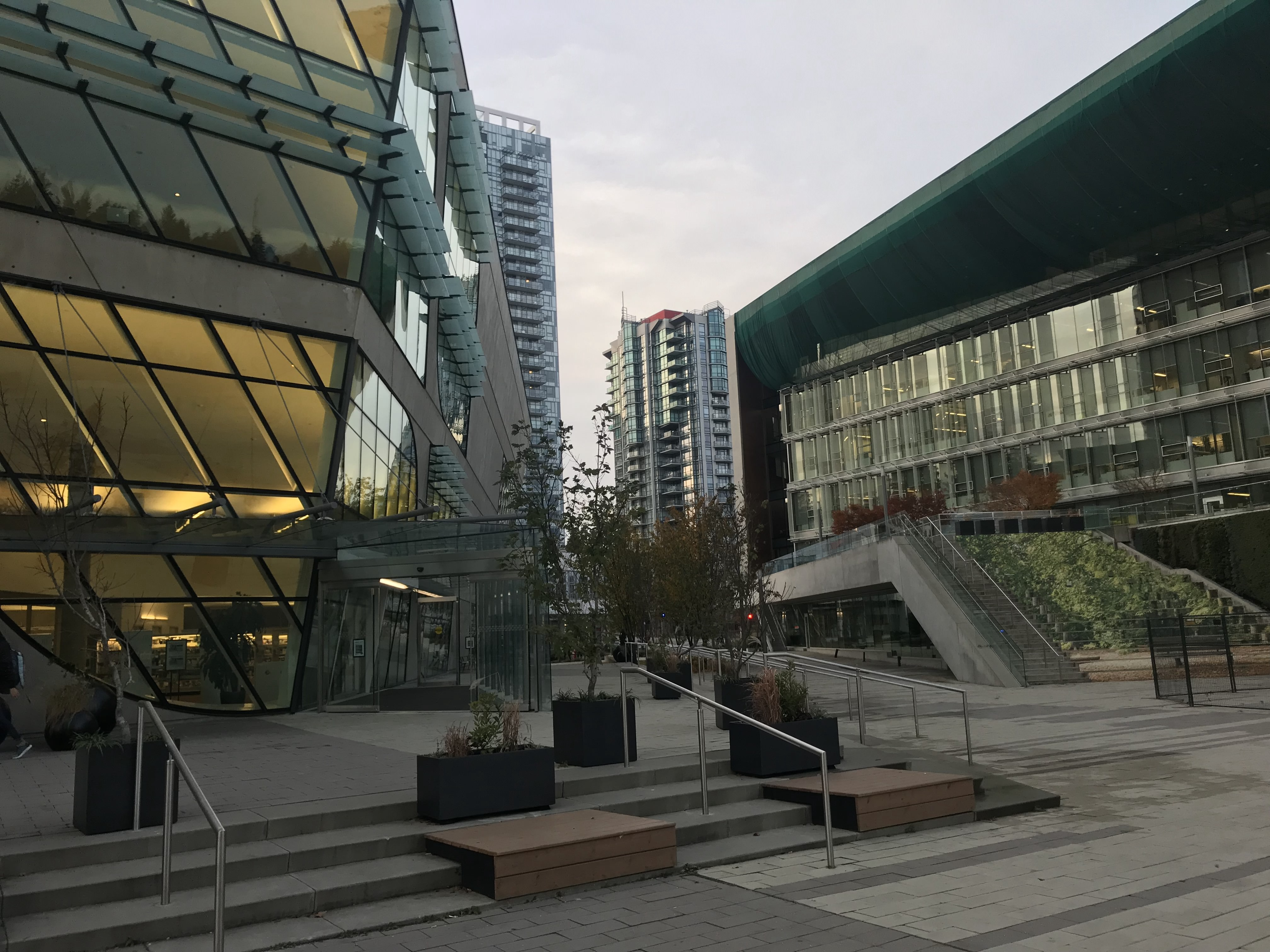
The Surrey Centre Library and City Hall are adjacent to the station.

Platform level at Surrey Central

Surrey Central is an elevated station on the Expo Line of Metro Vancouver's SkyTrain rapid transit system. The station is located in the Whalley / City Centre district of Surrey, British Columbia, Canada, just east of the North Surrey Recreation Centre. The station is within walking distance of the Central City shopping centre, Surrey City Hall, and SFU Surrey, the Surrey campus of Simon Fraser University.

== History ==
Surrey Central station was opened in 1994 along with two other stations when the Expo Line was extended from Scott Road station farther into Whalley, to the "Surrey City Centre" district. Prior to the opening of the station, there was a bus loop on the site known as "Whalley Exchange", which opened in 1975. The station was briefly known as "Whalley Central" during planning; however, the name "Surrey Central" was chosen in December 1992 as the winning entry in a public contest.

Over the years, the station has earned a reputation for being unsafe and a magnet for crime, including violence and drug trafficking. In 2009, it had the second-highest number of violent crimes in the SkyTrain system (with Commercial–Broadway station having the highest).

In an effort to combat the station's rundown image, and to show off experimental urban design, the City of Surrey and TransLink agreed to have Surrey Central station participate in the GVTA's Urban Transit Village program. The Transit Villages were defined by TransLink as "a new approach to station design and access." While the original schedule called for construction to be completed by the second quarter of 2007, nothing beyond design plans were completed. The Surrey Central plan specifically called for improvements in four areas: station access, street design, King George Boulevard, and land use.

Officers from the Metro Vancouver Transit Police can be found patrolling the bus loop and SkyTrain platform in an effort to reduce crime and disorder, with supplemental volunteers patrolling the area and reporting any suspicious or dangerous behaviour. By the mid-2010s, with extensive police patrols and redevelopment of the area, violent crimes shifted from Whalley south to Newton, which has taken over the area's reputation of being the most dangerous part of Surrey.

In March 2017, station upgrades started on Surrey Central station to create two new entrances on the north side of the station at Central Avenue and City Parkway to reduce congestion. Accessibility and lighting was also improved with three additional escalators and an elevator. Construction work was completed in February 2019, and the new stationhouse opened to the public in March 2019.

== Services ==
Surrey Central station is a transfer point for several bus routes that serve various areas of Surrey, White Rock, North Delta and Langley.

== Station information ==
=== Design ===
Surrey Central station was designed by Musson Cattell Mackey Architects and includes a series of references to Victorian-style train sheds, which the Vancouver Sun criticized as "attempts to create instant heritage where none exists".

=== Entrances ===
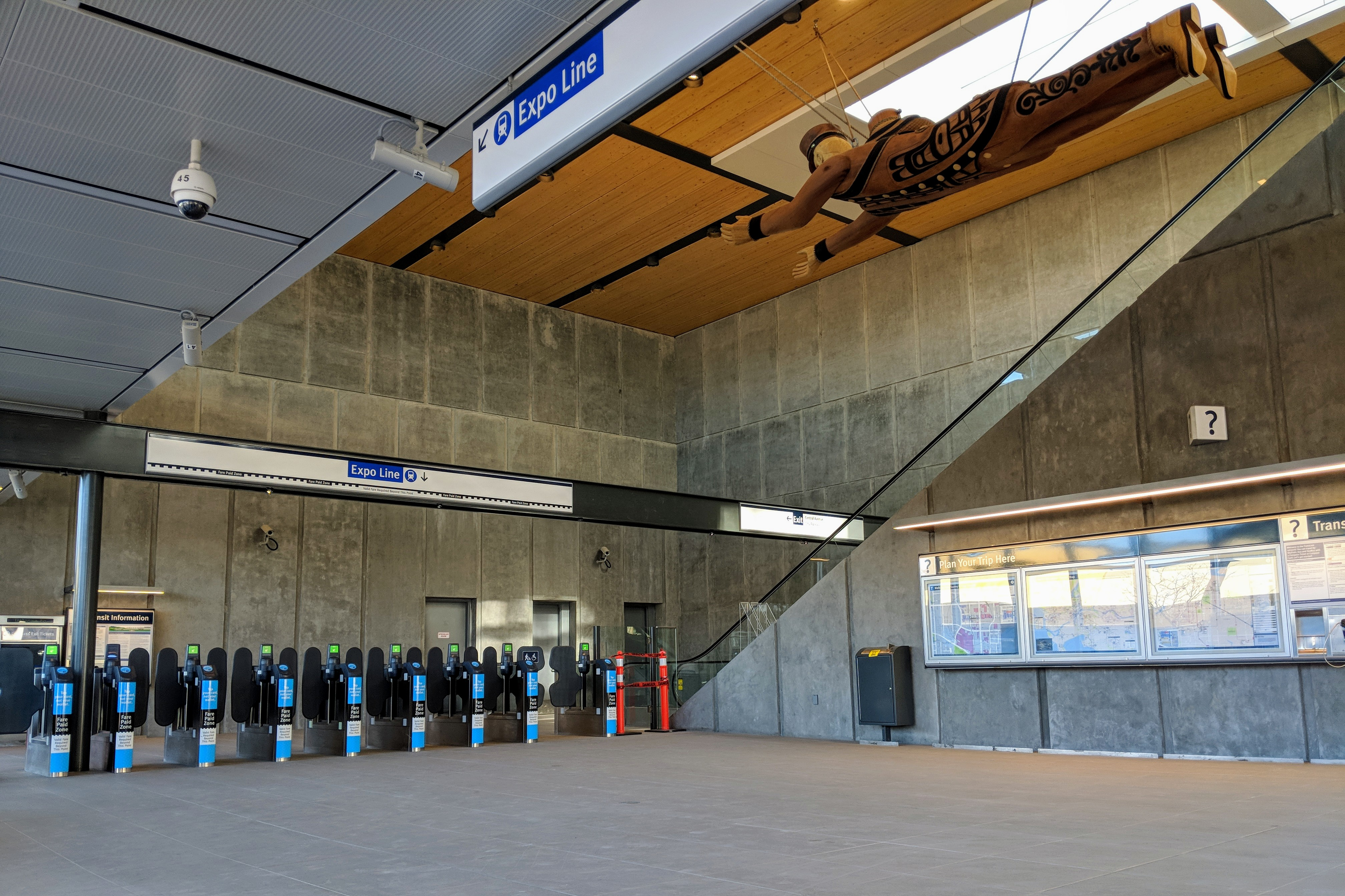
Lower concourse of Surrey Central's north stationhouse

- North stationhouse: located at the corner of Central Avenue and City Parkway, the stationhouse provides access to Surrey City Centre Public Library, Surrey City Hall and the Kwantlen Polytechnic University Civic Plaza campus. Renovations on the north entrances started in March 2017 to improve circulation and accessibility and the new stationhouse opened in March 2019.
- Rec Centre entrance (east): located on City Parkway and provides access to downtown Surrey and the North Surrey Recreation Centre. R1 King George Blvd stops are also located in front of this entrance.
- Bus Exchange entrance (southwest): located within the Surrey Central station bus exchange. An up escalator and stairs connect the bus exchange with the station platform via the concourse. This entrance also serves the Central City shopping centre and SFU Surrey Campus.

=== Transit connections ===
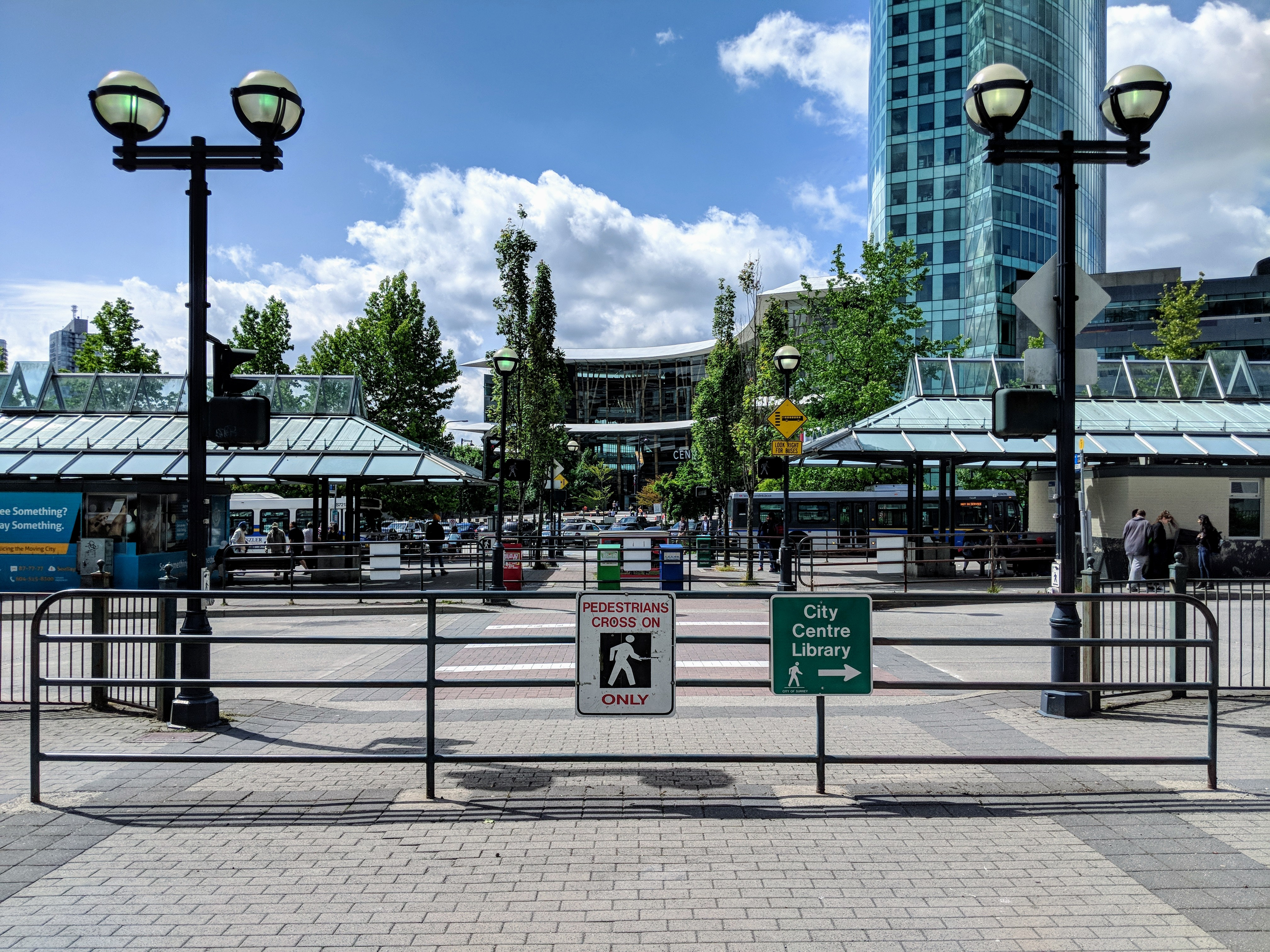
The bus exchange is located at the south end of Surrey Central.

Bus bay assignments are as follows:

Bay number	Location	Route	Notes
1	Bus loop	Unloading only	
2	Bus loop	501 Langley Centre	Via Carvolth Exchange
2	Bus loop	509 Walnut Grove	PM peak hours only
2	Bus loop	N19 Downtown	NightBus service
3	Bus loop	335 Newton Exchange	Via Guildford
4	Bus loop	323 Newton Exchange	Via 128 Street
4	Bus loop	393 Newton Exchange	Via South Newton; PM peak hours only
5	Bus loop	320 Langley Centre	Via Cloverdale
5A	University Drive; Northbound	337 Fraser Heights	
6	Bus loop	371 Scott Road Station	
6	Bus loop	373 Guildford	
7	Bus loop	316 Scottsdale	Via 116 Street
7	Bus loop	325 Newton Exchange	Via 140 Street
8	Bus loop	324 Newton Exchange	Via 132 Street
8	Bus loop	326 Guildford	Via Fleetwood
9	Bus loop	321 White Rock Centre; 321 White Rock South; 321 New Westminster Station	Some trips extend as "White Rock South"; Limited service to New Westminster Station on Sundays and holidays only when SkyTrain is not operating
10	Bus loop	503 Fraser Hwy Express to Langley and Aldergrove	
11	City Parkway; Southbound	R1 King George Blvd to Newton Exchange	RapidBus service
12	City Parkway; Southbound	502 Langley Centre	Via Fraser Hwy
13	City Parkway; Northbound	R1 King George Blvd to Guildford	RapidBus service
14	City Parkway; Northbound	314 Sunbury; 314 Scott and 96 Avenue	Sunbury portion: Monday to Saturday only during daytime; Scott and 96 Avenue portion: evening, Sunday, and holiday service
14	City Parkway; Northbound	321 Scott Road Station	Peak hours only
14	City Parkway; Northbound	329 Scottsdale	Monday to Saturday only
