= TransLink Mayors' Council =

The TransLink Mayors' Council on Regional Transportation (commonly known as the TransLink Mayors' Council) is the "collective voice of Metro Vancouver residents on transit and transportation".

It is composed of the mayors of all 21 municipalities of the Metro Vancouver Regional District, as well as the director of Electoral Area A and the chief of Tsawwassen First Nation, to set priorities for public transportation in the region.

The council is responsible for approving certain TransLink plans and policies. The council uses a weighted vote when making decisions.

The council has advocated for the provincial government to spend more on public transportation in the region.
