= Guildford Exchange =

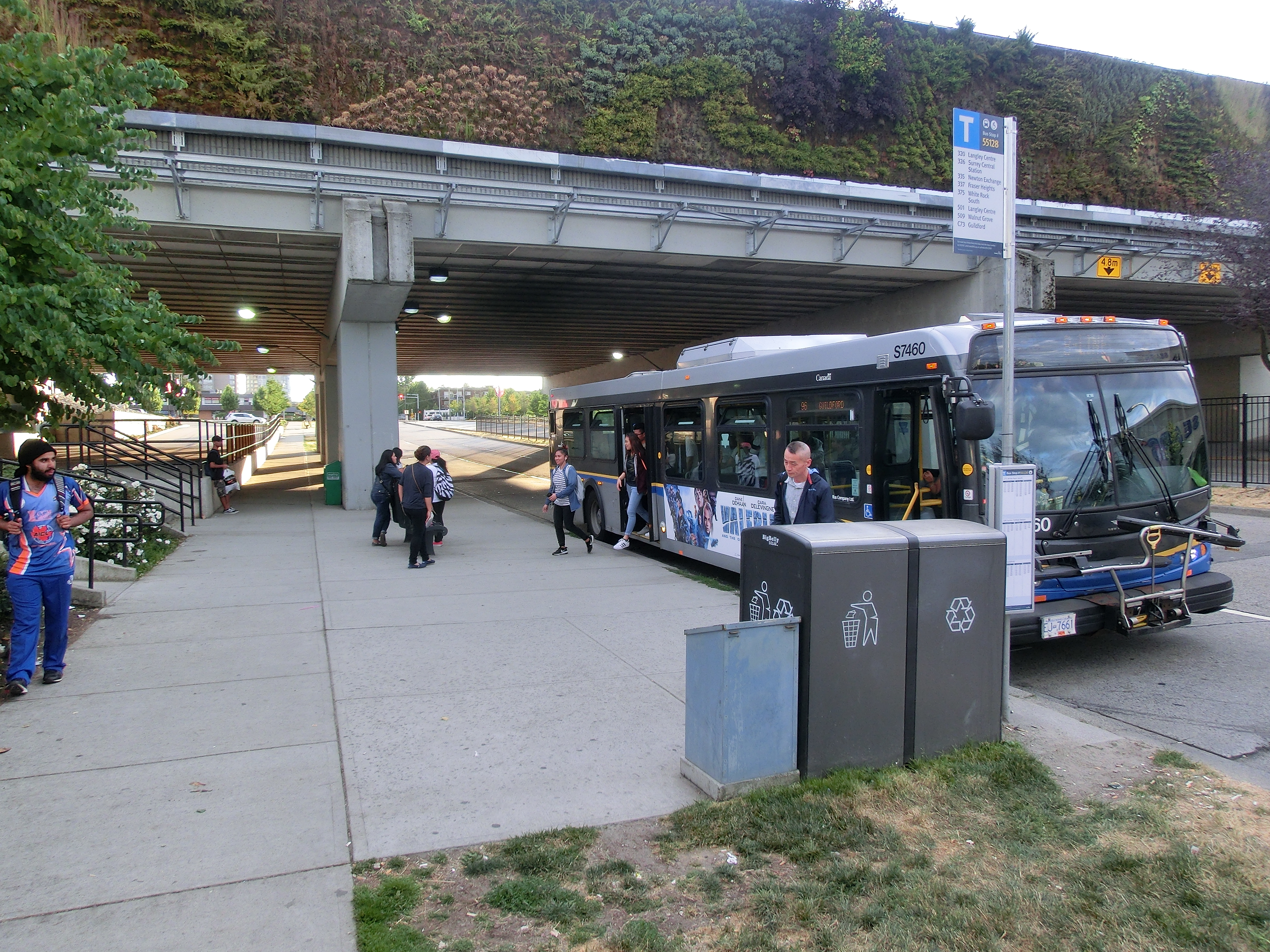

General information
- Location: Guildford Town Centre; Surrey, British Columbia; Canada
- Coordinates: 49.191394°N 122.803643°W
- Operator: TransLink
- Bus routes: 12
- Bus stands: 5
- Bus operators: Coast Mountain Bus Company
- Connections: R1 King George Blvd

Other information
- Fare zone: 3

History
- Opened: May 30, 1975
Location

Guildford Exchange is a major public transit exchange serving Guildford Town Centre in Surrey, British Columbia, Canada. Opened on May 30, 1975, it is a connection point for routes serving the Whalley, Fleetwood, Guildford and Cloverdale areas of Surrey, as well as Langley Centre. A number of routes using the exchange serve the SkyTrain system via Surrey Central Station.

== Structure and location ==
The exchange is mainly located on 104 Avenue, in the mid-block between 150 and 152 Street, under the pedestrian overpass at Guildford Town Centre mall. Two more stops are located along 105th Avenue immediately north of the mall by Guildford Recreation Centre. There are designated bus standing and loading areas but no separation from regular traffic. Transfers between eastbound and westbound buses require passengers to travel on the pedestrian overpass, which is only open during the mall operating hours. Passengers with mobility issues and anyone travelling outside of the mall operating hours must cross the street at an intersection, which is approximately 5 minutes on foot.

== Transit connections ==
Bay assignments are as follows:

| Bay | Location | Routes |
|---|---|---|
| 1 | 104th Avenue; Eastbound | 320 Fleetwood / Langley Centre (Note: Approximately every second trip extends to Langley Centre); 326 Surrey Central Station; 335 Newton Exchange; 337 Fraser Heights; 375 White Rock South; 501 Langley Centre; 509 Walnut Grove |
| 2 | 104th Avenue; Westbound | R1 King George Blvd to Newton Exchange; 320 Surrey Central Station; 335 Surrey Central Station; 337 Surrey Central Station; 341 Newton Exchange; 501 Surrey Central Station; 509 Surrey Central Station |
| 3 | 104th Avenue; Eastbound, slightly west of Bay 2 | 341 Guildford; 373 Guildford; All services: unloading |
| 4 | 105th Avenue at Lincoln Drive; Westbound | 373 Surrey Central Station |
