= List of tallest buildings in Surrey, British Columbia =

Skyline of Surrey
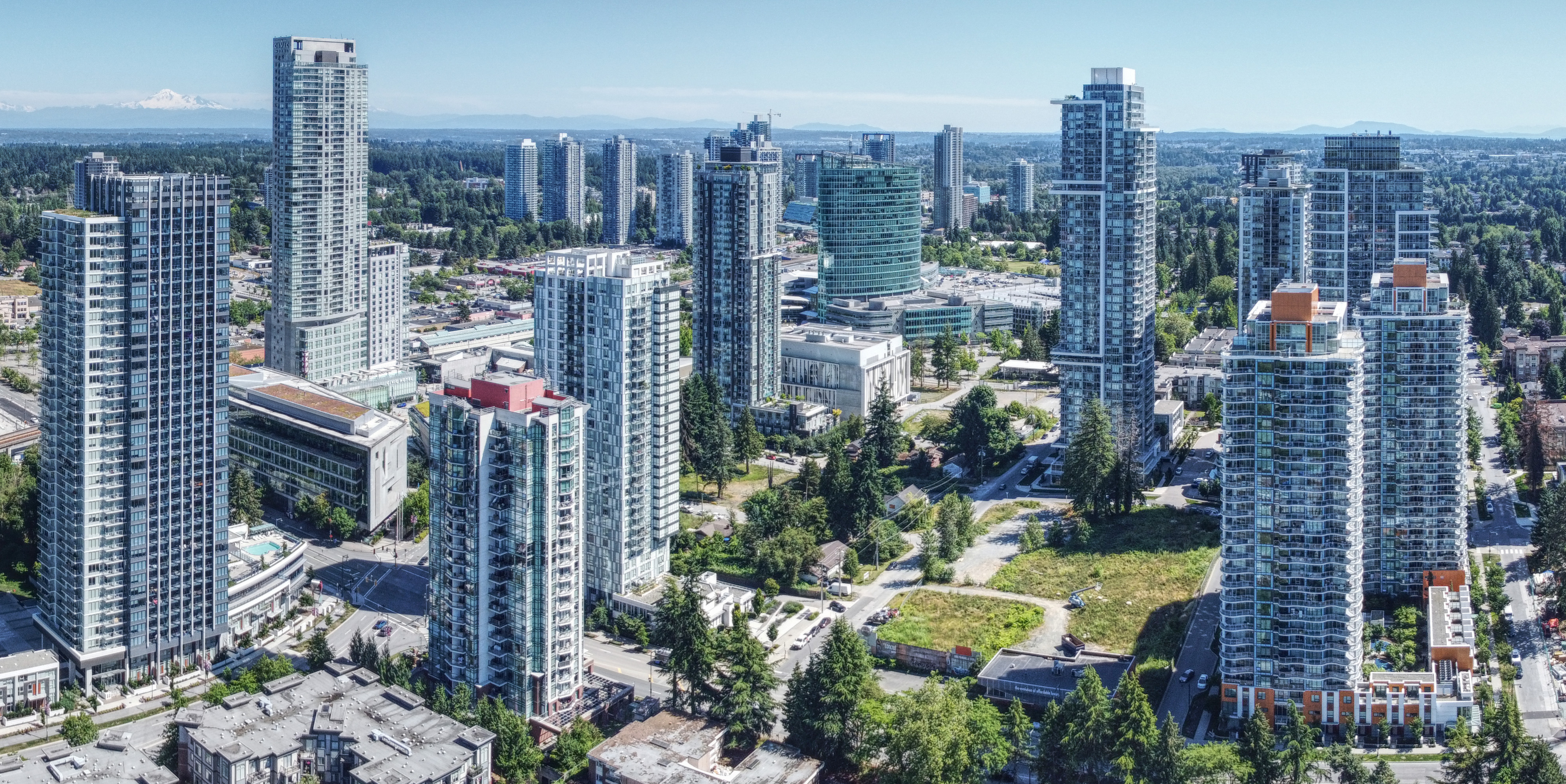
- Skyscrapers in Surrey City Centre surrounding Surrey Central station in 2025
- Tallest building: 3 Civic Plaza (2018)
- Tallest building height: 157.3 m (516 ft)
- First 150 m+ building: 3 Civic Plaza

Number of tall buildings (2026)
- Taller than 100 m (328 ft): 23
- Taller than 150 m (492 ft): 1

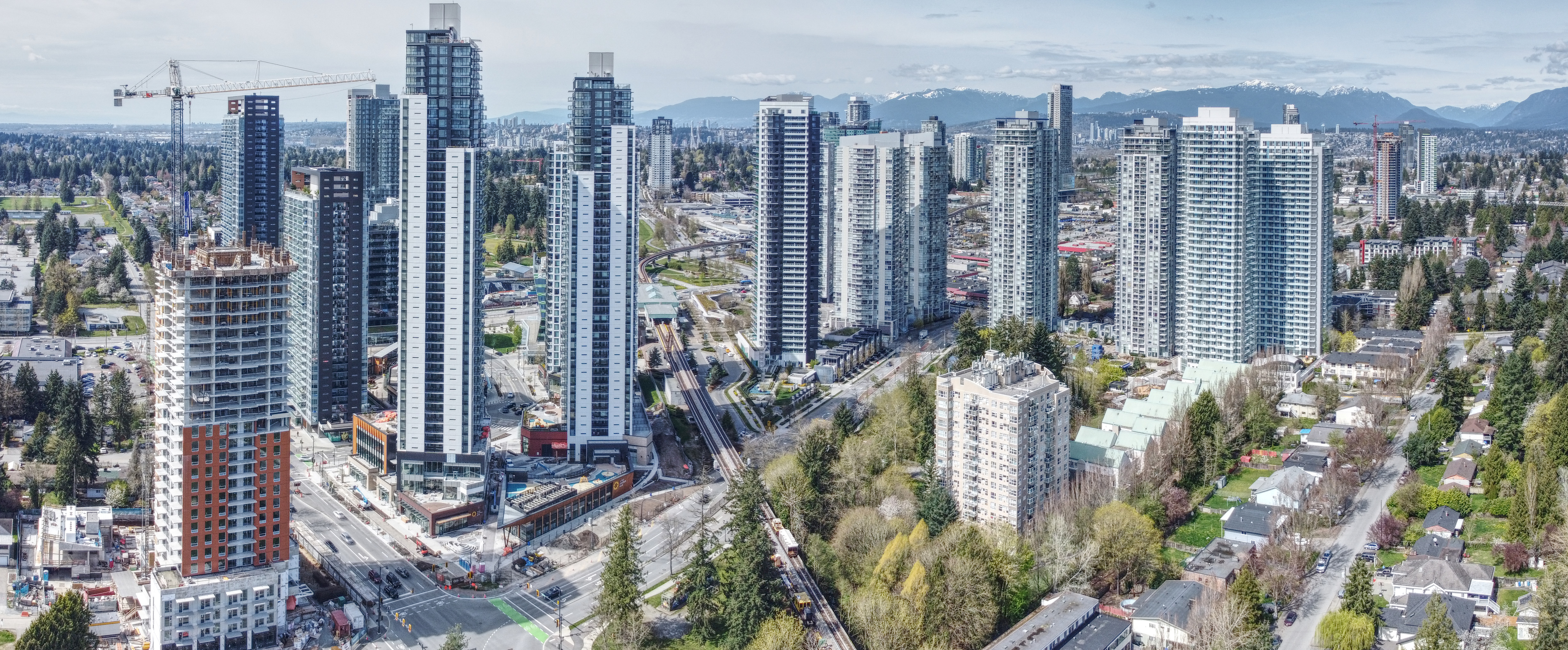
The skyline around King George station in 2025, a few hundred metres south of Surrey Central.

Surrey is the second most populous city in Greater Vancouver and in the Canadian province of British Columbia. Similarly to the Greater Vancouver municipalities of Burnaby and Coquitlam, Surrey has seen an influx in residential high-rises since the 2000s. Surrey is home to 23 buildings taller than 100 m (328 ft) as of 2026, the third-most of any city in Greater Vancouver, after Vancouver and Burnaby. The tallest building in Surrey is the 157.3 m (516 ft), 52-storey 3 Civic Plaza. Completed in 2018, it is the city's only skyscraper taller than 150 m (492 ft).

Most of Surrey's tallest buildings are located in Surrey City Centre, in the neighbourhood of Whalley. The district contains the highest concentration of high-rise condominiums in Greater Vancouver south of the Fraser River. In 1976, Whalley was identified as one of four regional town centres in Surrey, leading to the development of Surrey City Centre, now the city's central business district. The city adopted the "Whalley–Guildford Plan" in 1985, proposing high-density commercial development along 104 Avenue between the Whalley and Guildford areas. Since the 2000s, Surrey City Centre has become home to numerous high-rise buildings. The mixed-use Central City development, completed in 2003, included Surrey's first building exceeding 100 m (328 ft) in height, as well as a shopping mall.

Much of Surrey's high-rise development has been transit-oriented. Surrey City Centre is served by the Gateway, Surrey Central, and King George stations on the Expo Line of Greater Vancouver's SkyTrain system. It is the only town centre in Surrey served by the SkyTrain. All three stations are surrounded by a substantial number of tall buildings. The rate of high-rise construction has increased since the 2010s. By 2025, multiple buildings have overtaken Central City in height. One major project is King George Hub, a mixed-use development adjacent to King George station that has been underway since 2012. King George Hub is expected to be completed by 2026. While Whalley is the only town centre in Surrey with a substantial number of tall buildings, high-rises have also been proposed in Guildford since the 2020s.

== History ==
Number of buildings by height in Surrey by the end of each year, based on the information in this article. Click on the legend to toggle a specific height on or off. View chart definition.

== Cityscape ==
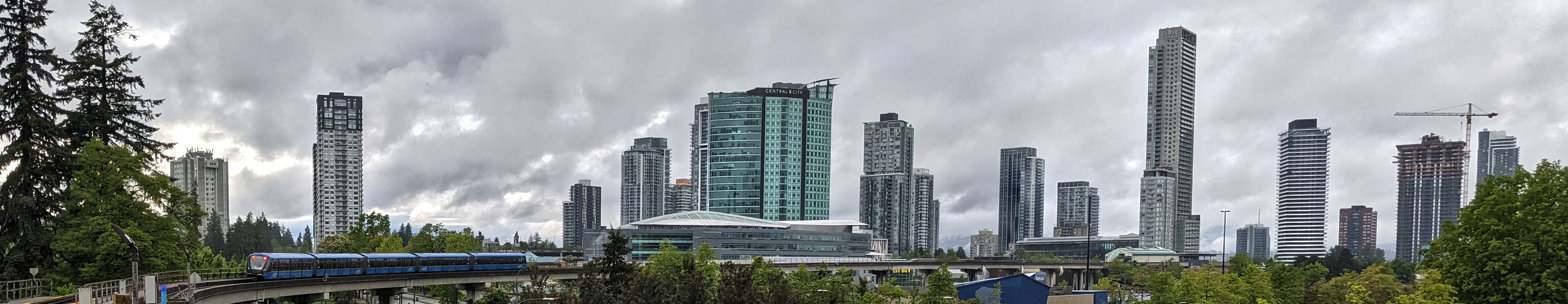
Surrey's skyline viewed from King George station in 2025. Central City tower (centre) was Surrey's tallest building from 2003 to 2017. Overlooking it is Surrey's tallest building, 3 Civic Plaza (right).

== Map of tallest buildings ==
The map below shows the location of every building taller than 100 m (328 ft) in Surrey. Each marker is numbered by the building's height rank, and colored by the decade of its completion.

Buildings taller than 100 m (328 ft) in Surrey.
- 2000s
- 2010s
- 2020s
1 3 Civic Plaza
2 The Grand on King George
3 Plaza Two at King George Hub
4 One Central
5 Plaza One at King George Hub
6 King George Hub One
7 Park Boulevard
8 Park Avenue West
9 Parkway I
10 Central City
11 Park Avenue East
12 Park George I
13 Comma King George
14 Prime at the Plaza
15 University District South Tower
16 Evolve
17 One Park Place
18 Two Park Place
19 The Line
20 Park George II
21 Park Place at Central City
22 Flamingo One
23 Ultra

== Tallest buildings ==
This list ranks completed buildings in Surrey that stand at least 100 m (328 ft) tall, based on standard height measurement. This includes spires and architectural details but does not include antenna masts. The “Year” column indicates the year of completion. Buildings tied in height are sorted by year of completion with earlier buildings ranked first, and then alphabetically.

Was the tallest building in upon completion

Rank	Name	Image	Location	Height m (ft)	Floors	Year	Purpose	Notes
1	3 Civic Plaza		49°11′26″N 122°50′53″W	157.3 (516)	52	2018	Mixed-use	Tallest building in Surrey since 2018. First building in Surrey to exceed 150 m (492 ft) in height. Tallest building completed in Surrey in the 2010s. Mixed-use residential and hotel building. The hotel is operated by Autograph Collection. Kwantlen Polytechnic University's Civic Plaza campus occupies the first five floors above the open lobby.
2	The Grand on King George		49°11′52″N 122°50′48″W	149.5 (490)	46	2025	Residential	Tallest building completed in Surrey in the 2020s.
3	Plaza Two at King George Hub		49°10′52″N 122°50′33″W	141.4 (464)	44	2025	Residential	
4	One Central		49°11′24″N 122°51′09″W	133.6 (438)	44	2023	Residential	
5	Plaza One at King George Hub		49°10′54″N 122°50′34″W	130.9 (429)	41	2025	Residential	
6	King George Hub One		49°10′51″N 122°50′42″W	130.7 (429)	40	2021	Residential	
7	Park Boulevard		49°10′58″N 122°50′37″W	124 (407)	42	2021	Residential	
8	Park Avenue West		49°11′02″N 122°50′33″W	121 (397) (Note: Sources do not state the exact height of this building. This figure was determined using Google Earth by subtracting the altitude of the building's lowest main pedestrian open-air entrance from its highest architectural point.)	41	2017	Residential	Tallest building in Surrey briefly from 2017 to 2018.
9	Parkway I	–	49°11′32″N 122°50′51″W	119.1 (391)	38	2026	Residential	
10	Central City		49°11′16″N 122°50′59″W	119 (390)	37	2003	Office	Tallest building in Surrey from 2003 to 2017. Tallest building completed in Surrey in the 2000s. First building in Surrey to exceed 100 metres (328 ft) in height.
11	Park Avenue East		49°11′02″N 122°50′30″W	116 (379)	40	2017	Residential	
12	Park George I		49°11′01″N 122°50′28″W	115.4 (379)	39	2024	Residential	
13	Comma King George		49°10′41″N 122°50′40″W	114.9 (377)	39	2025	Residential	
14	Prime at the Plaza		49°11′24″N 122°51′01″W	114.4 (375)	37	2019	Residential	
15	University District South Tower		49°11′32″N 122°51′02″W	113.9 (374)	37	2023	Residential	
16	Evolve		49°11′25″N 122°51′13″W	113.7 (373)	36	2019	Residential	
17	One Park Place		49°11′02″N 122°50′37″W	110 (361)	36	2011	Residential	
18	Two Park Place		49°11′01″N 122°50′37″W	110 (361)	36	2011	Residential	
19	The Line		49°10′55″N 122°50′36″W	109 (358)	34	2021	Residential	Also marketed as The Line at King George Hub.
20	Park George II		49°11′02″N 122°50′26″W	108.4 (356)	36	2024	Residential	
21	Park Place at Central City	–	49°11′02″N 122°50′41″W	106 (348)	36	2008	Residential	Also known as Infinity.
22	Flamingo One	–	49°11′52″N 122°50′36″W	103 (338)	35	2025	Residential	
23	Ultra		49°11′23″N 122°51′12″W	102 (335)	36	2013	Residential	

== Tallest under construction or proposed ==
=== Under construction ===
The following table includes buildings under construction in Surrey that are planned to be at least 100 m (328 ft) tall as of 2026, based on standard height measurement. The “Year” column indicates the expected year of completion. Buildings that are on hold are not included.

Name	Height m (ft)	Floors	Year	Purpose	Notes
Parkway II	169.1 (555)	50	2026	Residential	
Holland Parkside II	125 (410)	39	2026	Residential	
King George Hub South	118.1 (387)	41	2026	Residential	
The Holland II	103 (338)	32	2026	Residential	
City Centre 4	100.9 (331)	23	2026	Residential	

== Timeline of tallest buildings ==
Name	Image	Years as tallest	Height m (ft)	Floors	Reference
Ted Kuhn Towers		1972–1994	70.1 (230)	22	
Station Tower		1994–2003	73.2 (240)	18	
Central City		2003–2017	119 (390)	37	
Park Avenue West		2017–2018	121 (397)	41	
3 Civic Plaza		2018–present	157.3 (516)	52	

== See also ==
- List of tallest buildings in British Columbia
- List of tallest buildings in Vancouver
- List of tallest buildings in Burnaby
- List of tallest buildings in Coquitlam
