= The Black Arts Centre =

The Black Arts Centre (BLAC)
- Surrey
- Established: 2020
- Location: 3 Civic Plaza, British Columbia, Canada
- Coordinates: 49°11′12.42″N 122°50′54.39″W
- Type: Art Gallery
- Collections: Contemporary
- Website: theblackartscentre.ca

The Black Arts Centre (BLAC) is an artist-run gallery in Surrey, British Columbia, Canada. The gallery itself was created to serve its largest Black Population. The space was designed to serve not only as a gallery but also as a community space. Owned and operated by black youth located in Surrey, They exist as a way to support and provide resources for Black art and artists within the Greater Vancouver Area. The centre acts as a venue to host Black community organizations' events, workshops and exhibitions. It is located at 3 Civic Plaza and is open from Thursday-Saturday from 1-6 pm. BLAC's gallery is located on "ground-level" with an "accessible washroom" (VanCity, n.d.). The organisation's directors include Olumoroti Soji-George, Vanessa Fajemisin, and Hafiz Akinlusi.

== History ==
BLAC was established by a group of Simon Fraser University alumni in 2020, initially funded and as a part of the Solid State Community Society. Solid State launched in 2017, is a local mutual support network built by and for marginalized communities, dedicated to combating exploitative work practices and uplifting the co-op model. The network offers financial solidarity and/or funding to mainly work-cooperatives in the Surrey Area. Solid State community is currently funded by a plethora of agencies, such as the Government of British Columbia, Canadian Race Relations Foundation, and more.

The gallery was originally by five people: Rebecca Blair, Hafiz Akinlusi, Vanessa Fajemisin, Arshi Chadha.

In 2021, BLAC became an independent non-profit agency. The gallery involves representing the nuances of Blackness, and the BIPOC community in Surrey, and the greater Vancouver area. Moreover, BLAC was created during the Black Lives Matter movement and attributes its ongoing success partially to the exposure the movement gave the center initially.

== Mission and Values ==
BLAC's mission entails providing a space for Black artists and youth to access spaces they were not previously welcomed into. BLAC, conceived during the height of the Black Lives Matter Movement, refer to the space as a community hub, dedicated to uplifting under-served and racialized communities in the Greater Vancouver Area. Their objectives include facilitating and creating cooperative spaces, and promoting mutual learning through intercultural care. Their values include Black plurality, agency within the creative process for Black artists, emphasizing intersectionality and investing in the development of artists' individuality, identity, and comfort.

== Directors ==
BLAC's directors consist of three professional multidisciplinary Black artists.

=== Olumoroti Soji-George ===
Olumoroti Soji-George is a curator and artistic director with a master's degree in Curatorial Studies from Simon Fraser University. He provides community support through mentoring artists and increasing accessibility in the arts. Also, he is an artist who has worked with the PuSh International Performing Arts Festival as a co-producer and curator.

=== Vanessa Fajemisin ===
Vanessa Fajemisin is a CAINE Black Entrepreneur Award winner, Solid State Co-Director, artist, and mentor. She is motivated by her experiences as a young Black Woman growing up experiencing racism and finds community in Solid State.

=== Hafiz Akinlusi ===
Hafiz Akinlusi is a curator and Simon Fraser University alum. Raised in Nigeria, he gained a perspective that affects how he navigates his artistic practice, focusing on the Black experience as someone born outside of Canada.

== Exhibitions and Programming ==
The Black Arts Centre is a multidisciplinary hub and showcases art and artists from multiple mediums. BLAC programming entail open mic nights, film screenings and various workshops, and more. Operating their programming calendar through Instagram, the gallery utilizes the platform to share announcements, events, and future exhibitions. BLAC curates exhibitions that discuss the Black experience and emphasize intersectional identities, like womanhood, Queerness, and families. Past Exhibitions include, the pair of exhibitions BLAC curated for Emily Carr University: Concealed Cultures, Visualizing the Black Vernacular and I see; I breathe; I am! which included artists from across the Black diaspora. The Black Arts Centre also frequently collaborate with different community partners such as the Surrey Art Gallery for differing exhibitions, such as un/tangling, un/covering, un/doing curated by Suvi Bains, and Charles Campbell: An Ocean to Livity curated by Jordan Storm.

== Challenges ==
BLAC faces struggles to maintain the space among Surrey's historically high rental prices despite discounted rent, grants, and community attendance.

== Building ==
BLAC Gallery is located on the ground floor of 3 Civic Plaza, also known as 3 Civic Tower. It's also known as Surrey's tallest building, and neighbors Surrey City Hall, and across Surrey Central Station.

== See also ==
- List of art museums
- List of galleries in British Columbia
- List of galleries in Metro Vancouver
