= Surrey Libraries =

Surrey Public Library (operating as Surrey Libraries)
- Established: 1983
- Branches: 10

Collection
- Items collected: Books, e-books, music, cds, periodicals, maps, genealogical archives, business directories, local history,
- Size: 790,000

Access and use
- Circulation: 4 million
- Population served: 580,000

Other information
- Budget: CA $20 million
- Director: Surinder Bhogal, Chief Librarian
- Employees: 260
- Website: www.surreylibraries.ca

Surrey Public Library, operating as Surrey Libraries, is the municipal library for the city of Surrey, British Columbia. Surrey Libraries serves the City's residents with programs, reference services, free resources, and holdings of digital and physical items across its ten branches. It is the third-largest library system in British Columbia by total population served, after Fraser Valley Regional Library and Vancouver Public Library.

== Services ==
Surrey Libraries provides:

- A borrow-able physical collection, including print books, DVDs, Blu-Rays, music CDs, audiobook CDs/MP3s, book club kits, children’s storytime kits, and technological resources .
- An online library, with databases, e-books, e-periodicals, streaming audio/video, and interactive modules geared toward topics such as genealogy, accessibility, career advancement, citizenship, and lifelong learning
- Information services, including reference and Reader’s Advisory
- Programming for patrons of all ages
- Accessibility services, including home delivery, assistive technologies, and collections for people with print disabilities
- Resources for newcomers to Canada, including assistance finding work and housing, information on low cost or free services in the area, English Language training programs and collections, and books in many different languages spoken around the world
- Partnerships with community organizations to provide supplemental services
- A Family History department at the Cloverdale branch, with over 3,000 books, 5,000 microfilm reels, and more than a dozen online databases in its collection

== History ==
1980s

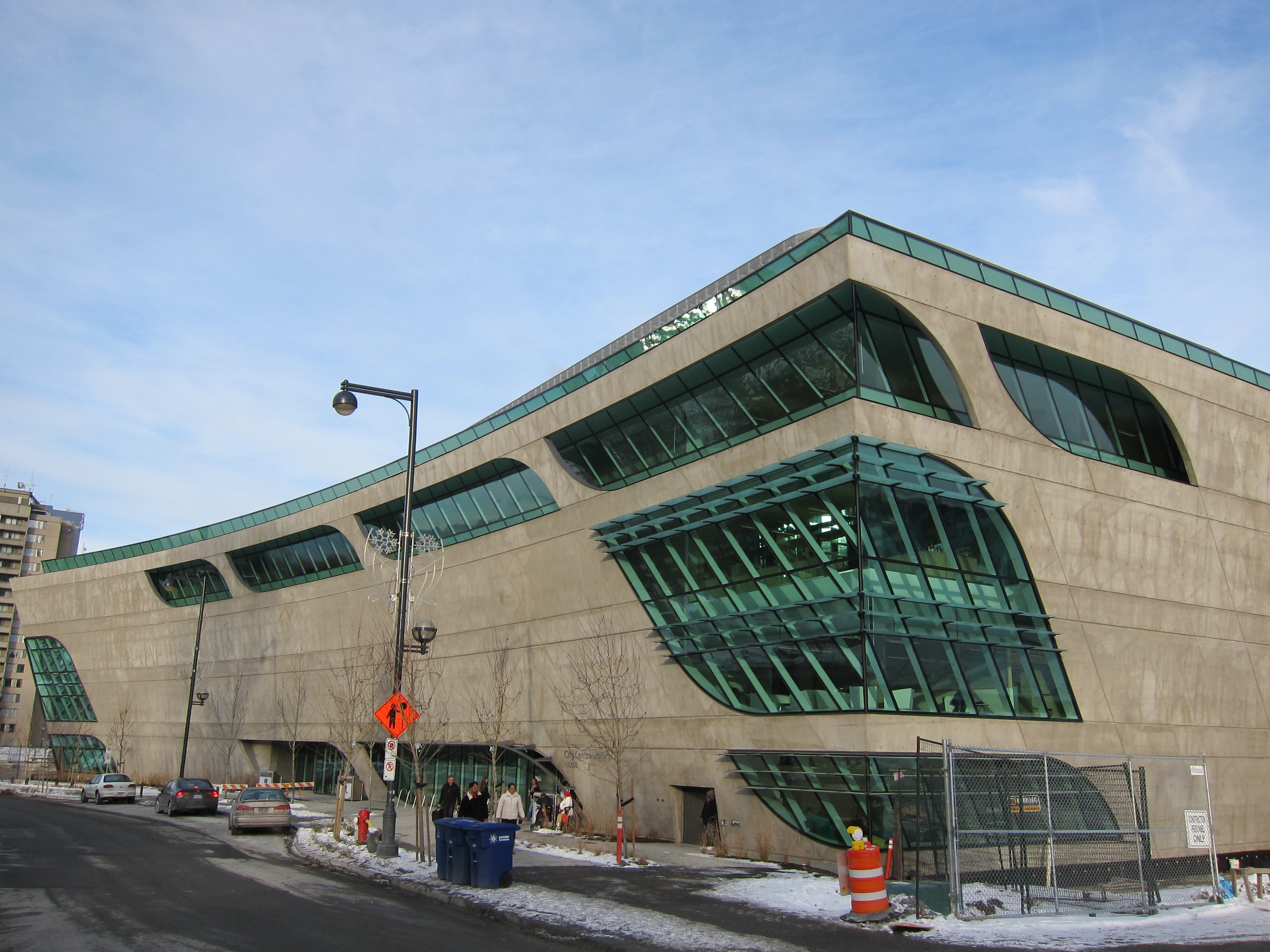
Exterior of the SW corner of the Surrey City Centre Library

Before 1983, all City of Surrey library branches were part of the Fraser Valley Regional Library system. On November 20, 1982, Surrey voters passed a referendum to establish a separate, amalgamated municipal library system. Five months later, on March 17, 1983, five branches (Guildford, Newton, Ocean Park, Port Kells, and Whalley) began operations in the new Surrey Public Library system.

1990s

On May 2, 1992, the current Newton branch building opened to the public. The facility, designed by Vancouver firm Patkau Architects, won the Governor General's Award for Architecture in 1994. The Fleetwood branch opened on June 24, 1995, as part of the Fleetwood Community Centre. It became the seventh branch in the Surrey Public Library system.

2000s

The 2000s saw the addition of the system’s eighth and ninth branches: Strawberry Hill in 2000 and Semiahmoo in 2003. In 2004, the Semiahmoo branch attained a LEED Silver Certification. It was the first LEED Certified library building in British Columbia and the first LEED Certified building of any kind in the City of Surrey. The second iteration of the Ocean Park branch also opened in 2000, nearly doubling the floor space of the previous building.

2010s - present

The City Centre Library opened in 2011, replacing the old Whalley branch. Designed by Bing Thom Architects, the four-floor, 82,000 square-foot LEED Gold Certified facility now serves as the system’s main library. The public space includes four meeting rooms for 40-80 people, five consultation rooms for 3-8 people, a silent study, a meditation room, a classroom for computer learning programs, a large children’s section on the first floor, and stations for assistive technologies. Its concrete-and-glass exterior and spacious, naturally-lit interior makes it a popular filming location for movies and television shows.

In 2024, a new Mobile Library service launched. The mobile library is equipped in a van that travels to various locations and contains over 1,000 books, Wi-Fi hotpsot, and laptops.

== Locations ==
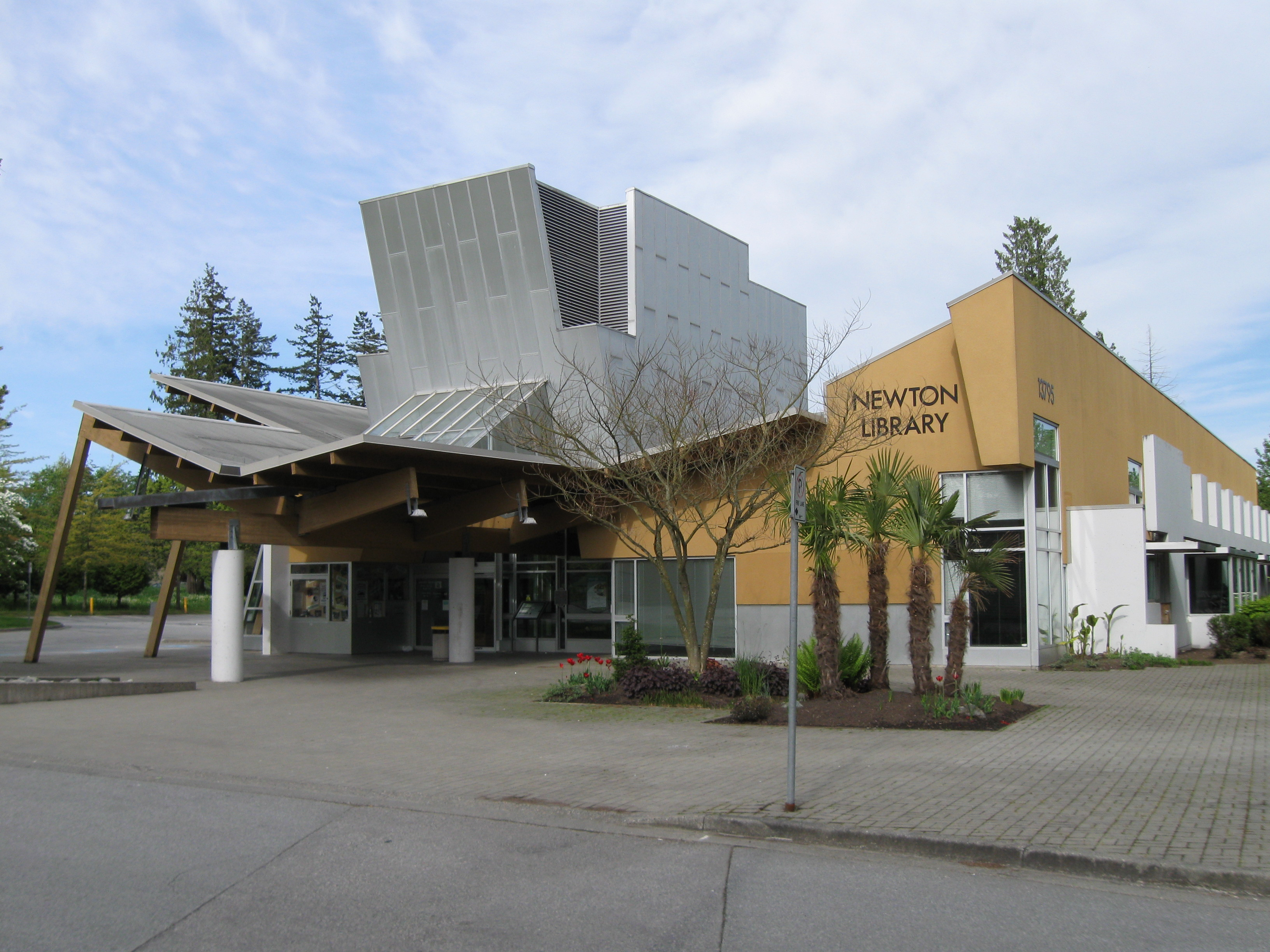
The award-winning Newton Library was officially opened on May 2, 1992

The library has ten branches:

- City Centre
- Clayton
- Cloverdale
- Fleetwood
- Guildford
- Newton
- Ocean Park
- Port Kells
- Semiahmoo
- Strawberry Hill

== Collections ==
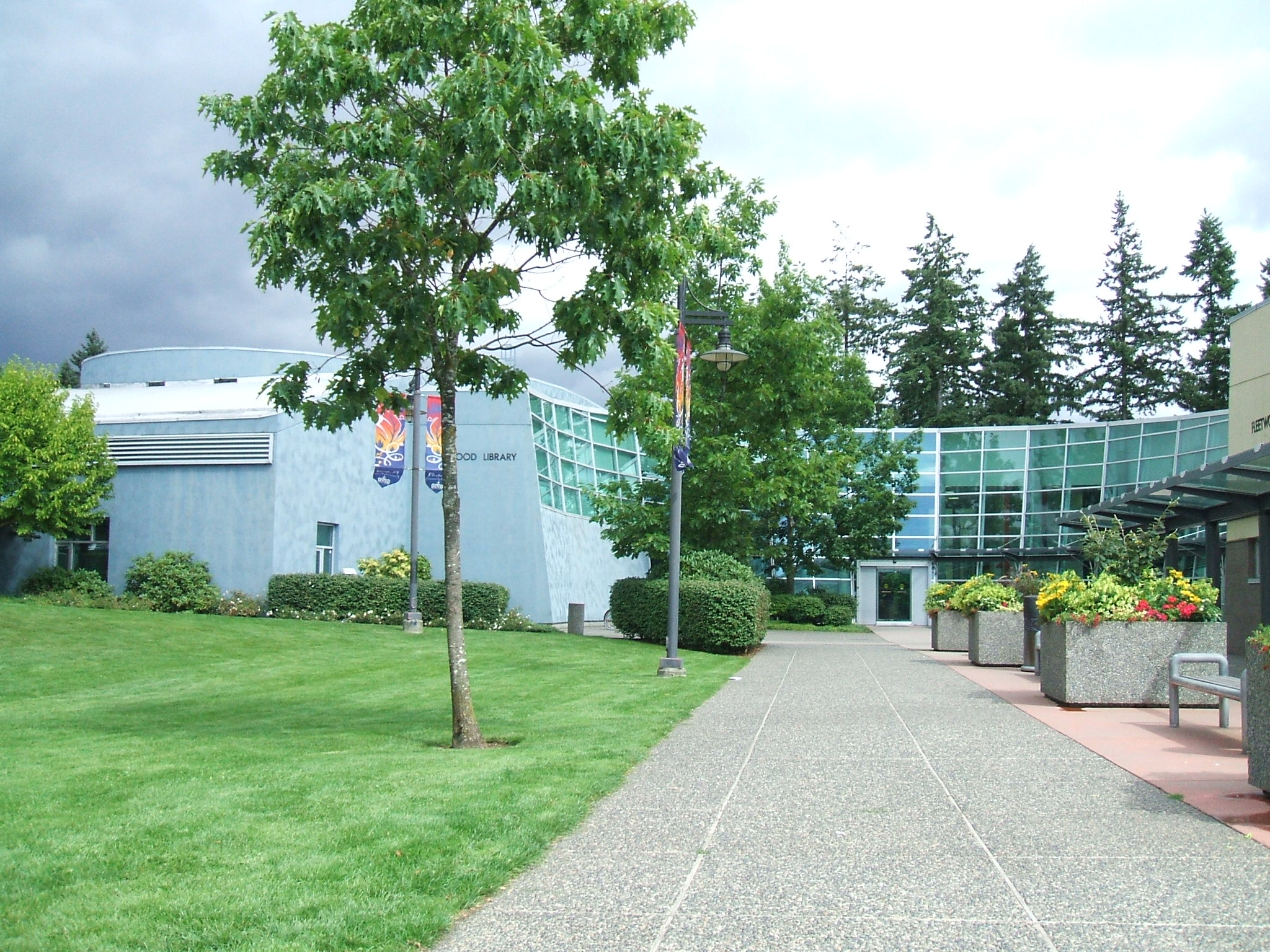
Fleetwood Library branch of the Surrey Public Library

- Surrey Libraries provides patrons with books, music CDs, books on CD, databases, DVDs, magazines, reference books, newspapers and online materials. Library material is available in Arabic, Chinese, Dutch, French, German, Hindi, Japanese, Korean, Persian, Punjabi, Polish, Russian, Spanish, Tagalog, Urdu, and Vietnamese. The online learning collection includes a large collection of streaming/downloadable eBooks, eAudio and movies.
- Accessibility Services offers home delivery services and specialized collections including downloadable eBooks and eAudio to Surrey patrons with print and other disabilities.
- Genealogy services are offered through the Family History Department which holds the largest collection of Canadian genealogy resources in Western Canada and offers numerous programs on genealogy.

== Awards ==
Year	Award	Giver
1994	Governor General Award for architecture Newton Branch Patkau architects	Architecture Canada and the Canada Council for the Arts
1997	Citation for Citizenship	Citizen and Immigration Canada
2004	Cultural Diversity Award	Surrey Delta Immigration Services Society
2005	Honorable Mention	Community Learning - Conference Board of Canada
2006	Cultural Diversity Award	Surrey Delta Immigration Services Society
2009/2010	BCLA Merit Award for Storytimes to help learn English	British Columbia Library Association
2010/1011	BCLA Merit Award for Festival of Aboriginal Arts	British Columbia Library Association
2011	Non Profit Business of the Year	Surrey Board of Trade
2016	BCLA Merit Award: Advocacy or Marketing for Literacy Day Report	British Columbia Library Association
2018/2021	Community Safety Partner Award	Surrey Crime Prevention Society
2019	Community Leader Award	Surrey Homelessness and Housing Society
