= Whalley, Surrey =

Whalley Surrey City Centre
- Town centre of Surrey
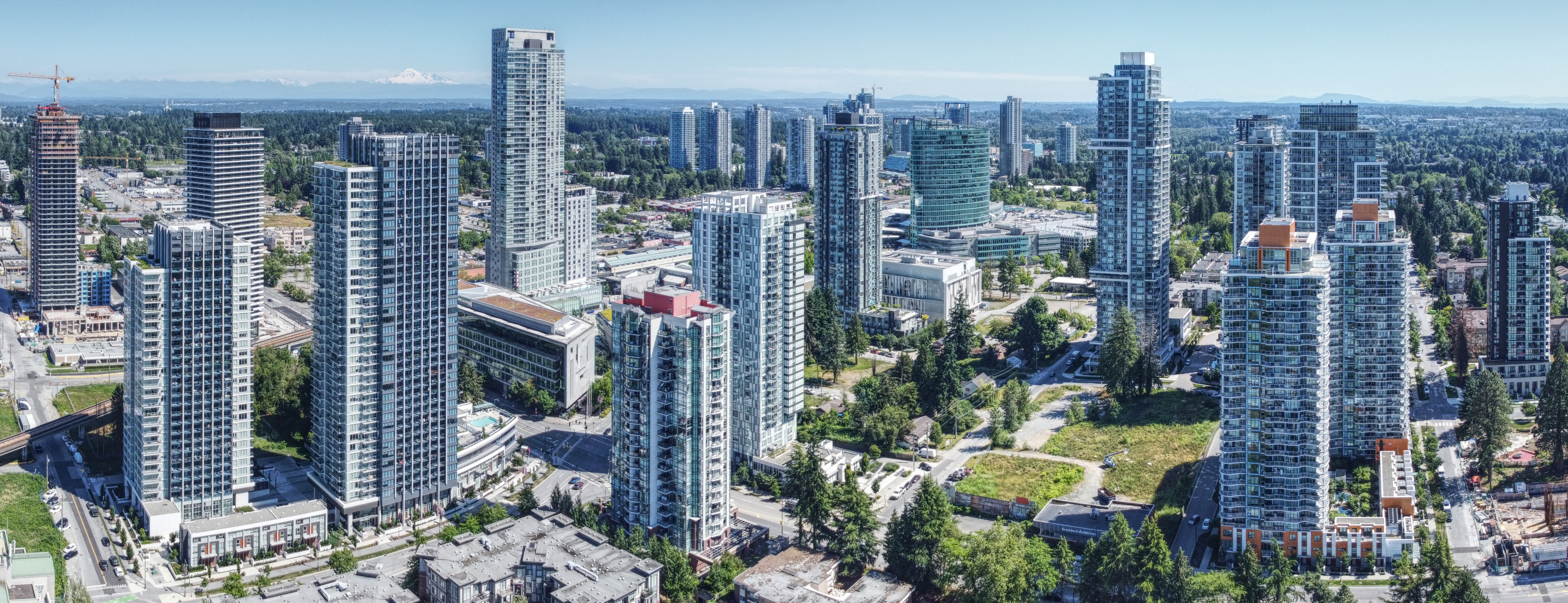
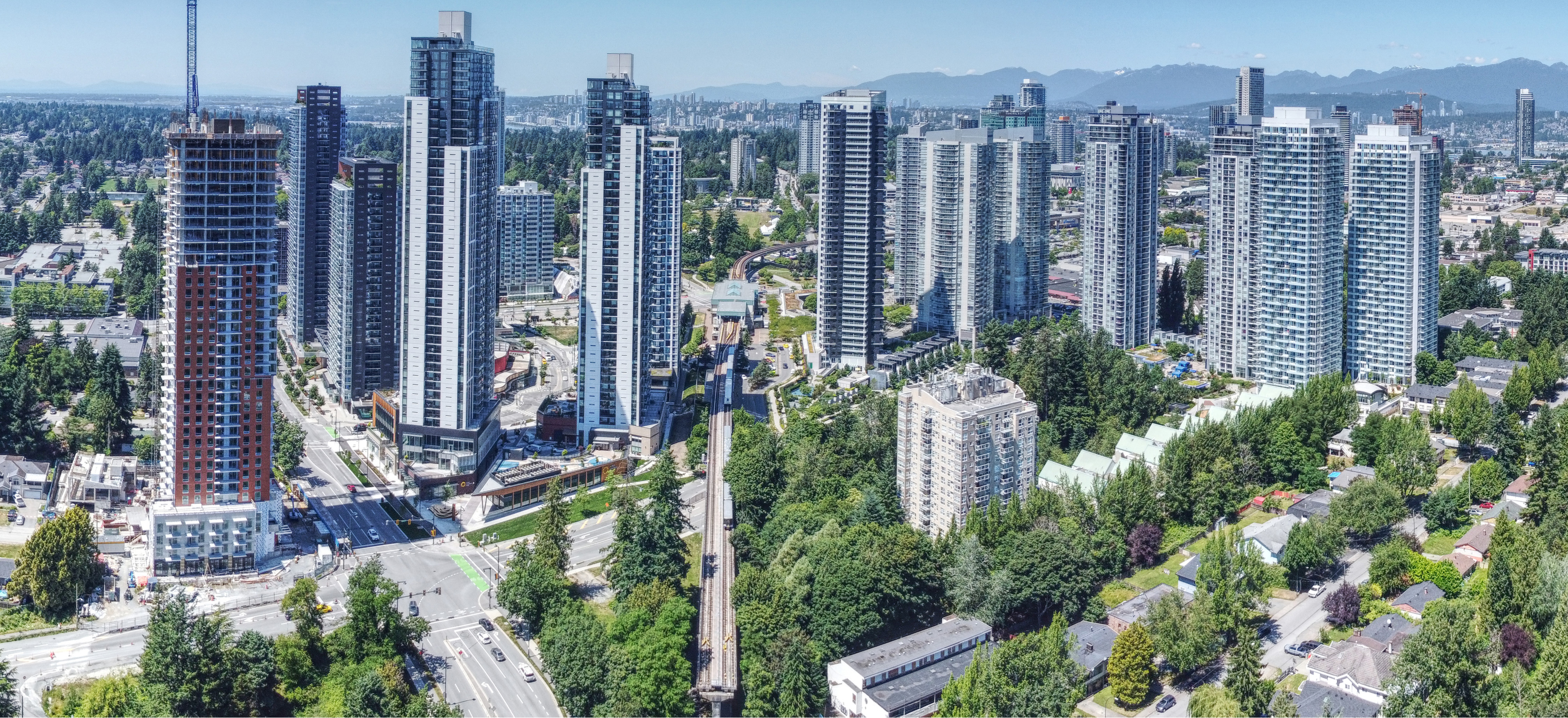
- Skylines surrounding Surrey Central (top) and King George (bottom) in Surrey City Centre

- Location of Whalley within Metro Vancouver
- Coordinates: 49°11′30″N 122°50′45″W
- Country: Canada
- Province: British Columbia
- Region: Lower Mainland
- Regional District: Metro Vancouver
- City: Surrey
- Incorporated: 1948

Government
  - Mayor: Brenda Locke
  - MP (Fed.): Randeep Sarai (Liberal)
  - MLA (Prov.): Mandeep Dhaliwal (BCC); Amna Shah (NDP)

Population (2016)
  - Total: 102,555
- Including City Centre
- Time zone: UTC−8 (PST)
  - Summer (DST): UTC−7 (PDT)

Whalley is the most densely populated and urban of the six town centres in Surrey, British Columbia, Canada. It encompasses City Centre, the city's central business district, and is home to the Surrey City Hall, the main branch of Surrey Libraries, Central City, SFU Surrey and the site of Kwantlen Polytechnic University's (KPU) Civic Plaza campus. It is the only town centre in Surrey served by Metro Vancouver's SkyTrain rapid transit system. Expo Line stations serving Whalley include Scott Road, Gateway, Surrey Central and King George.

Based on the city of Surrey statistics, Whalley is the second-most populous community in Surrey after Newton. As of 2018, the population of Whalley is 75,610, while the population of City Centre, the central subarea in the Whalley core, is 26,945. The total population of the area is 102,555. Whalley is represented in the Legislative Assembly of British Columbia by the Surrey North and Surrey City Centre electoral districts, and in the House of Commons of Canada by the Surrey Centre electoral district. Randeep Sarai is Whalley's member of Parliament, and Mandeep Dhaliwal and Amna Shah are its members of the Legislative Assembly.

== History ==
As early as the 1880s, people began settling what is now Whalley. In 1908, the municipal council requested a grant to construct a roadway from Fraser Bridge to present-day 108 Avenue. This provided a much safer path to the river compared to the steep, winding Old Yale Road, and the new road later became part of King George Boulevard.

In 1925, Arthur Whalley moved his family from Cloverdale to a three-acre triangle of land at the future intersection of Ferguson Road (108 Avenue), Grosvenor Road and King George Boulevard. After clearing the land and spending their first winter in tents, they built a service station, which included a general store, soft drink stand, and tourist cabins.

The community officially adopted the name of Whalley in 1948, after the board of trade held a contest to rename what had become known as "Whalley's Corner". "Binnieville" had also been recommended, in honour of Tom Binnie, a local real estate and insurance broker who had fostered Whalley's growth as a commercial centre.

In the mid-20th century, Whalley saw numerous debates regarding its secession from Surrey to become a separate city or municipality. In 1976, Metro Vancouver (then known as the GVRD) identified Whalley as one of four regional town centres, sparking revitalization of the town centre. The City of Surrey adopted the "Whalley–Guildford Plan" in 1985, proposing high-density commercial development along 104 Avenue between the Whalley and Guildford areas.

In 2016, Coast Capital Savings moved their headquarters into City Centre at the King George Hub complex. In September 2020, Westland Insurance announced that they planned to move their headquarters into the district in 2022.

== Culture and cityscape ==
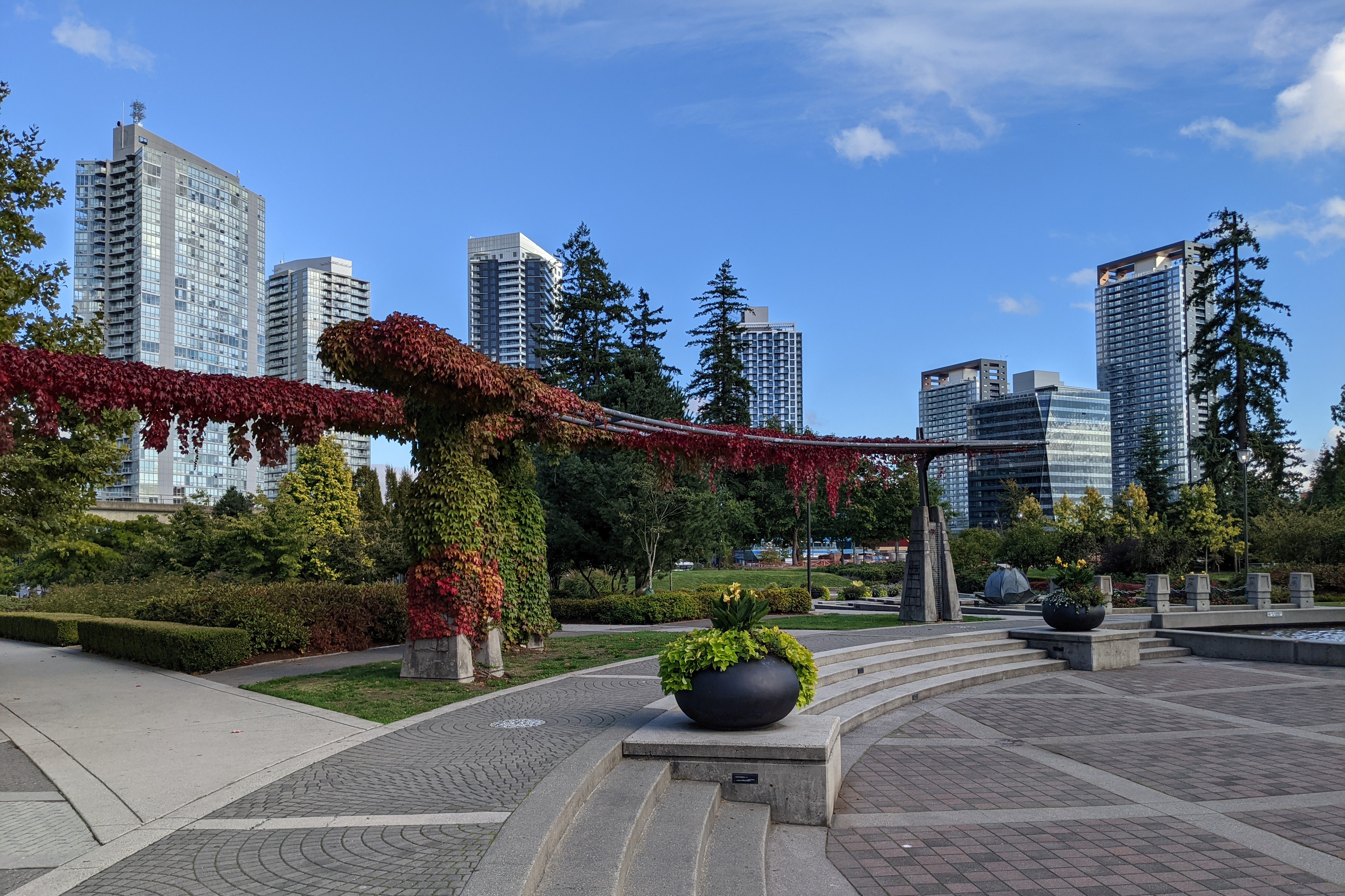
Holland Park facing southeast towards the King George Hub

Whalley is home to several public facilities such as Surrey City Hall and the Surrey City Centre Library. On 22 December 2019, the North Surrey Recreation Centre closed for redevelopment. The facility had an indoor swimming pool and two ice rinks.

Whalley also has the largest concentration of high-rises, both office and residential buildings, south of the Fraser River. As of 2022, the tallest building in Surrey is 3 Civic Plaza, at 50 stories and a height of 164 metres (538 ft). It consists of residential and office units, as well as a hotel.

=== Demographics ===
In 2016, the City of Surrey began publishing data separately for a subarea of Whalley called "City Centre". City Centre is located directly in the heart of the original Whalley neighbourhood.

=== Whalley ===
Ethnic groups in Whalley (2016) Source:		%
Ethnic group	South Asian	51%
Ethnic group	European	27%
Ethnic group	Filipino	7%
Ethnic group	Chinese	4%
Ethnic group	Aboriginal	3%
Ethnic group	Other	8%
Total %		100%

Languages spoken in Whalley (2016) Source:		%
Language	English	53%
Language	Punjabi	30%
Language	Hindi	4%
Language	Tagalog	2%
Language	Mandarin	1%
Language	Other	10%
Total %		100%

=== City Centre ===
Ethnic groups in City Centre (2016) Source:		%
Ethnic group	European	43%
Ethnic group	South Asian	14%
Ethnic group	Filipino	11%
Ethnic group	Chinese	11%
Ethnic group	Aboriginal	5%
Ethnic group	Other	16%
Total %		100%

Languages spoken in City Centre (2016) Source:		%
Language	English	68%
Language	Mandarin	6%
Language	Punjabi	4%
Language	Tagalog	4%
Language	Korean	3%
Language	Other	15%
Total %		100%

== Climate ==
Temperature extremes range from 37.0 °C, recorded on 29 May 1983, to −21.7 °C, recorded on 28 January 1969.

Climate data for Whalley (Elevation: 83.3m)
Month	Jan	Feb	Mar	Apr	May	Jun	Jul	Aug	Sep	Oct	Nov	Dec	Year
Record high °C (°F)	15.6 (60.1)	19.5 (67.1)	24.5 (76.1)	29.5 (85.1)	37 (99)	34.4 (93.9)	36.7 (98.1)	35 (95)	36 (97)	29 (84)	19 (66)	16.5 (61.7)	37 (99)
Mean daily maximum °C (°F)	5.7 (42.3)	8.1 (46.6)	10.8 (51.4)	13.9 (57.0)	17.3 (63.1)	19.6 (67.3)	22.9 (73.2)	23.2 (73.8)	20.2 (68.4)	14.7 (58.5)	8.6 (47.5)	5.7 (42.3)	14.2 (57.6)
Mean daily minimum °C (°F)	−0.3 (31.5)	1.1 (34.0)	2.5 (36.5)	4.7 (40.5)	7.7 (45.9)	10.2 (50.4)	12.1 (53.8)	12.5 (54.5)	9.9 (49.8)	6.4 (43.5)	2.4 (36.3)	0.2 (32.4)	5.8 (42.4)
Record low °C (°F)	−21.7 (−7.1)	−14 (7)	−12.2 (10.0)	−2.8 (27.0)	−1.7 (28.9)	2.2 (36.0)	5.6 (42.1)	4.4 (39.9)	0.6 (33.1)	−4 (25)	−17.5 (0.5)	−20.6 (−5.1)	−21.7 (−7.1)
Average precipitation mm (inches)	187.7 (7.39)	169.2 (6.66)	143.2 (5.64)	115.4 (4.54)	88.9 (3.50)	73.9 (2.91)	53.7 (2.11)	53.8 (2.12)	71 (2.8)	131.8 (5.19)	231.8 (9.13)	228.3 (8.99)	1,548.5 (60.96)
Average rainfall mm (inches)	163.3 (6.43)	155.0 (6.10)	139.3 (5.48)	115.1 (4.53)	88.9 (3.50)	73.9 (2.91)	53.7 (2.11)	53.8 (2.12)	71.0 (2.80)	131.6 (5.18)	226.7 (8.93)	208.1 (8.19)	1,480.4 (58.28)
Average snowfall cm (inches)	24.4 (9.6)	14.2 (5.6)	3.9 (1.5)	0.2 (0.1)	0.0 (0.0)	0.0 (0.0)	0.0 (0.0)	0.0 (0.0)	0.0 (0.0)	0.2 (0.1)	5.1 (2.0)	20.2 (8.0)	68.2 (26.9)
Source: Environment Canada

== Crime ==
Whalley was once regarded as one of the most dangerous parts of the Lower Mainland and was notorious for its crime. Until 2018, its streets were home to Surrey's "tent city": a strip along one of its inner neighbourhoods which was home to hundreds of homeless people. Since the early 2010s, after redevelopment of the area, violent crime has shifted south to Newton, which has taken over Whalley's reputation as being the most dangerous part of Surrey.
