= Holland Park, Surrey =

Park in Surrey, British Columbia, Canada

Holland Park
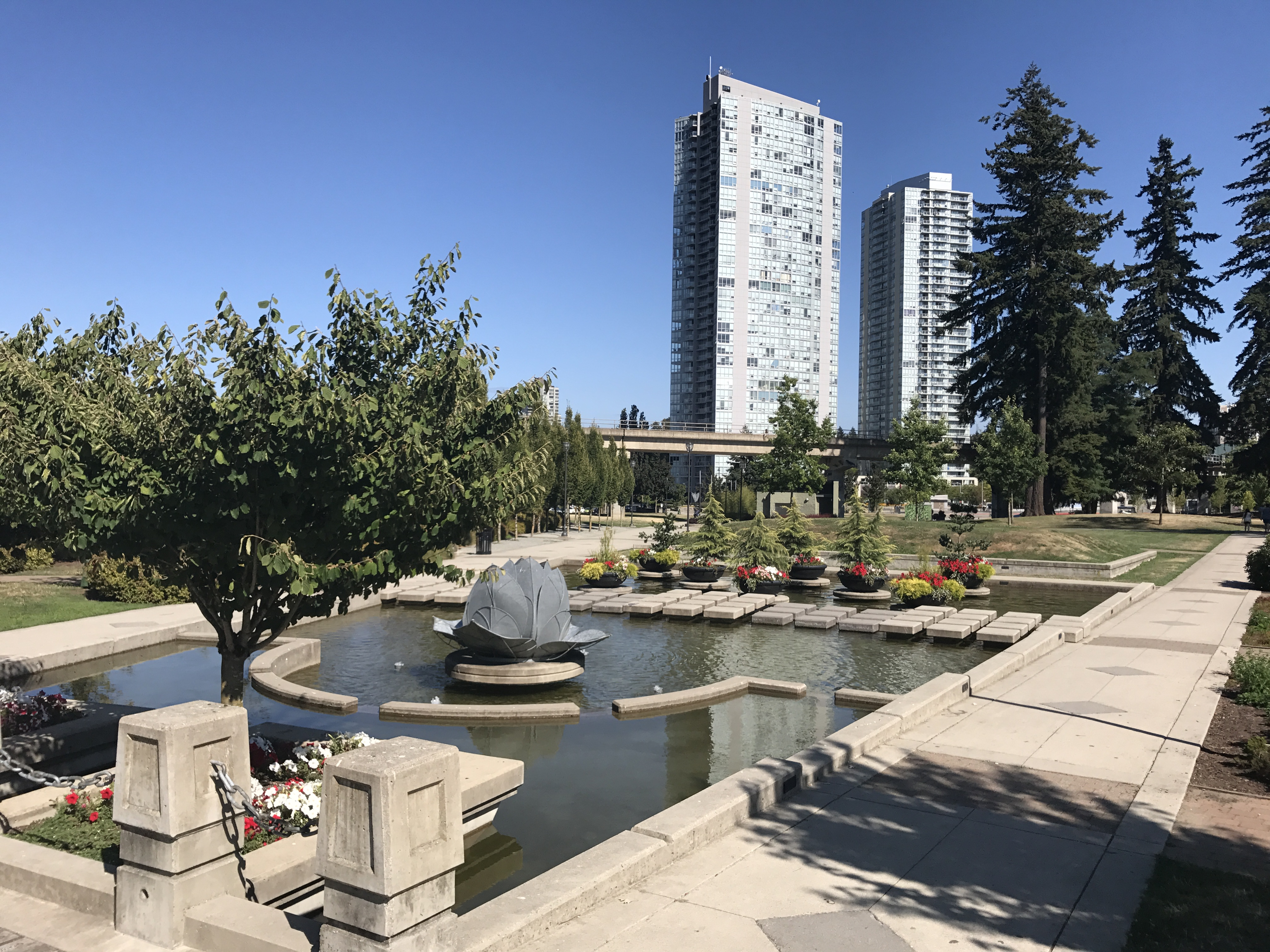
- Interactive map of Holland Park
- Type: Municipal
- Location: Surrey, British Columbia, Canada
- Coordinates: 49.183781°N 122.848419°W
- Area: 10.0 hectares (25 acres)
- Operator: City of Surrey
- Status: Open all year

Holland Park is a park in the city of Surrey, British Columbia, Canada, located within Whalley / City Centre beside Central City. It is 10 hectares (25 acres) in size and although it is not the largest park in the city, it has been called the "Central Park" of Surrey city centre. Originally a piece of land that was unused and not landscaped, the city of Surrey designated the area as an urban park and was transformed in the mid-2000s.

As the park is centrally located, it has become the focal point of a multitude of events and congregations throughout the year. The annual Fusion Festival, Surrey Pride, various music gatherings as well as other civic and cultural events have taken place within the park. In 2010, Holland Park also hosted one of the Vancouver Winter Olympics celebrations during the games. In 2015, Holland Park became the primary location for 'FVDED In The Park', western Canada's largest in city music festival, bringing in many internationally successful musicians every year, with the exception of 2023.

== History ==
The park is located on land previously homesteaded by George Holland. Holland worked as a motorman for the BC Electric Railway from 1901 to 1911.

== Amenities ==
- Sports Fields
- Basketball courts
- Playground
- Picnic area
- Public washroom

== Transportation ==
Holland Park is accessible by numerous bus services including TransLink's R1 rapid bus as well as the regional SkyTrain system, with the closest station being the King George station.

== Gallery ==
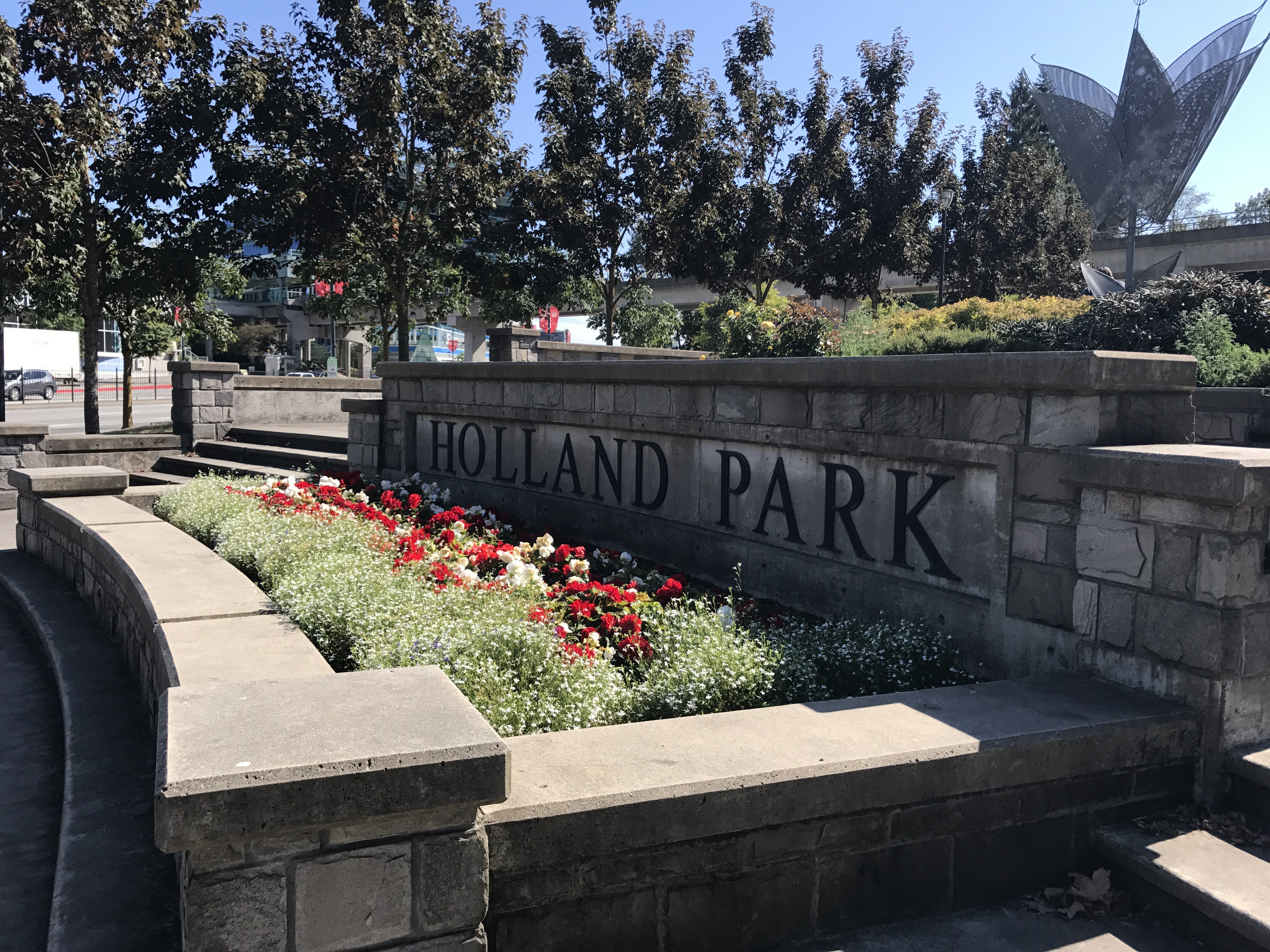
Holland Park from the corner of King George Boulevard and 100th Avenue

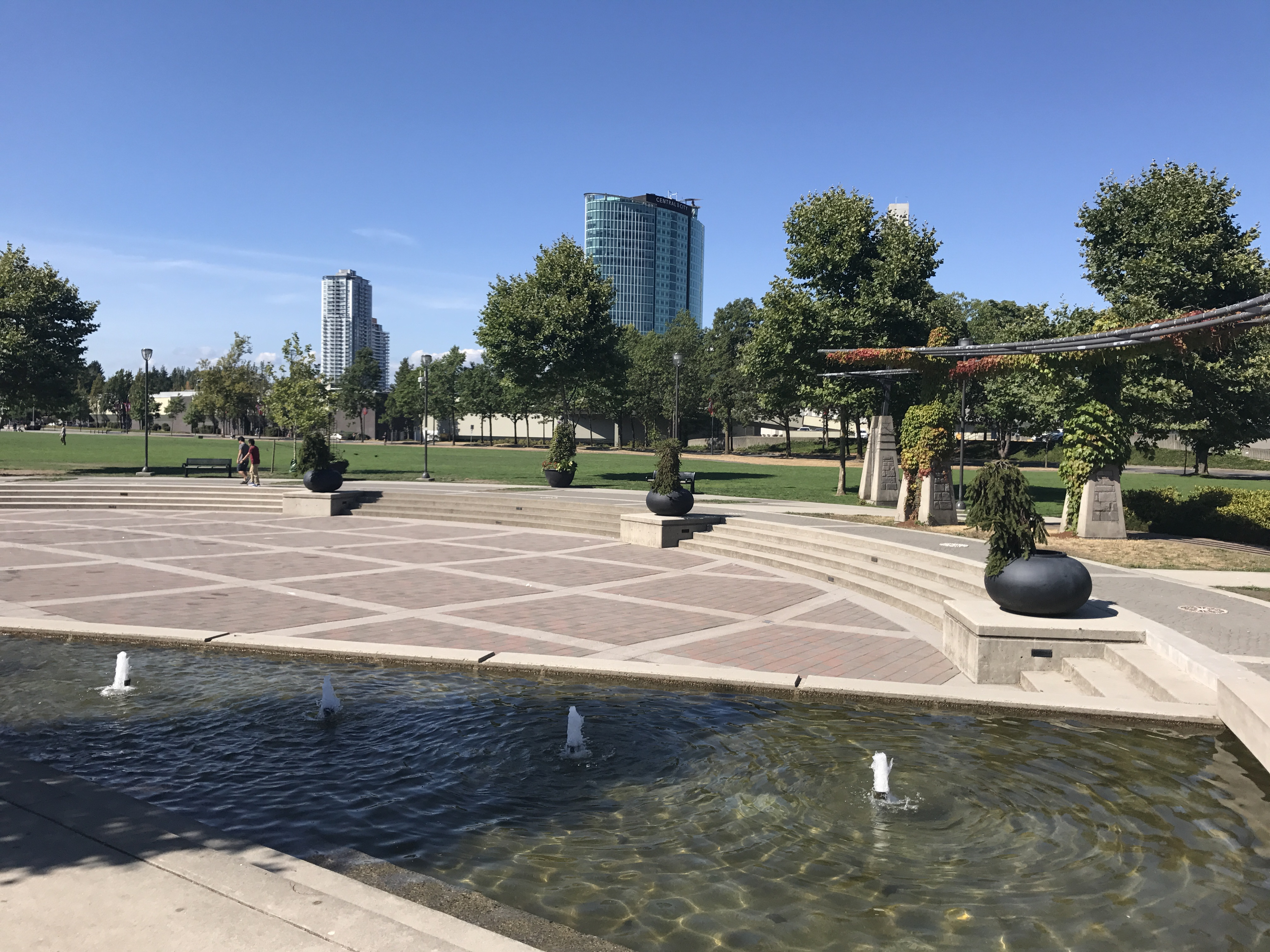
Landscaping includes water works and open lawns. Looking north towards Central City.
