= 3 Civic Plaza =

Mixed-use complex in Surrey, British Columbia, Canada

Civic Hotel, Autograph Collection
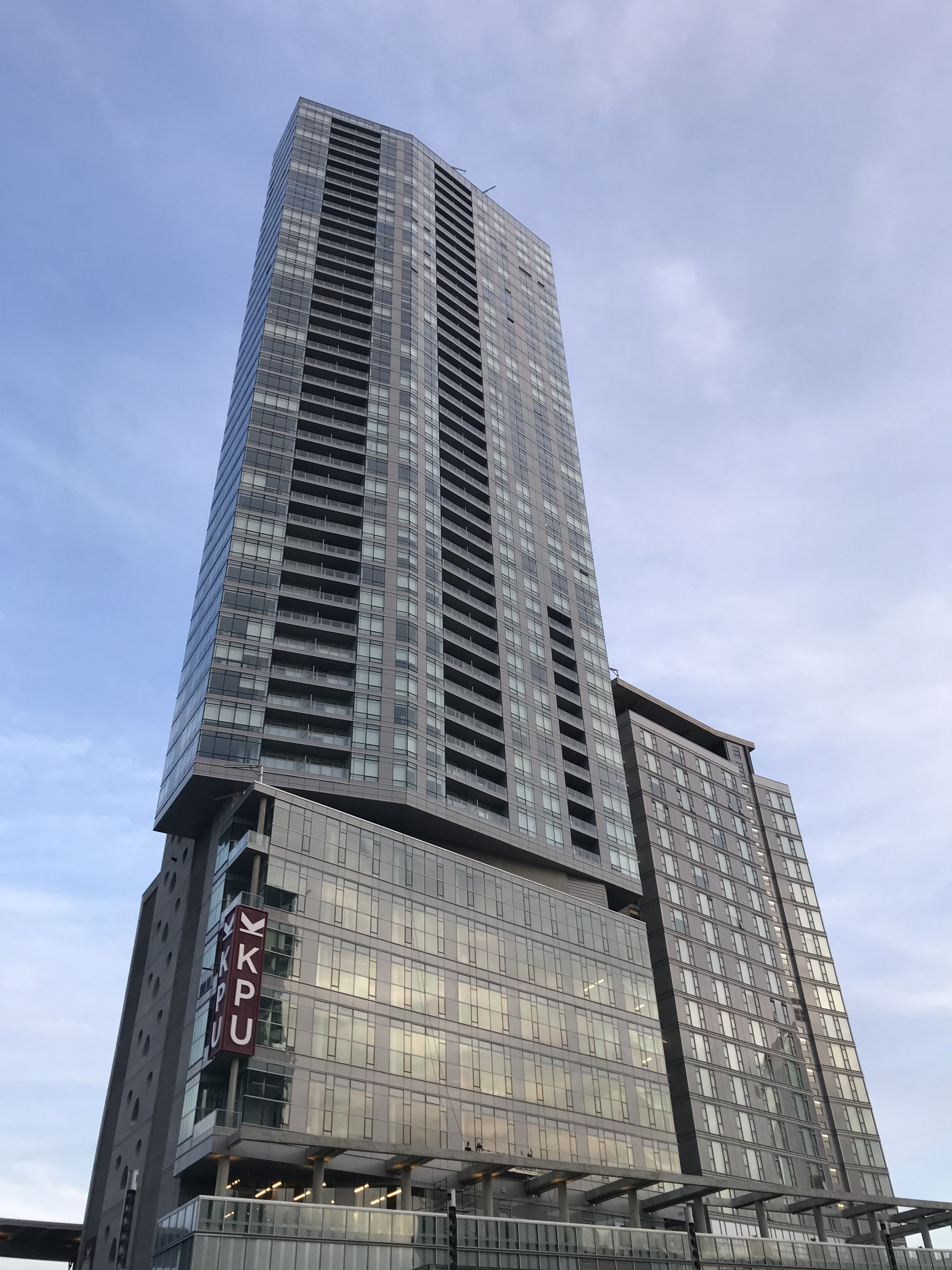
- Nov 2018 from the 3 Civic Plaza
- Interactive map of the Civic Hotel, Autograph Collection area

General information
- Type: Business hotel
- Architectural style: Modern
- Location: Surrey, British Columbia, Canada, 10347 City Parkway
- Coordinates: 49°11′12.42″N 122°50′54.39″W
- Construction started: 2014
- Completed: 2018
- Opening: April 2018
- Cost: $400 million
- Owner: City of Surrey

Height
- Antenna spire: none
- Roof: 157.3 m (516 ft)

Technical details
- Floor count: 54

Design and construction
- Architect: Patrick Cotter
- Developer: Century Group

3 Civic Plaza, also known as 3 Civic Tower, is a mixed-use complex in the Whalley/City Centre neighbourhood of Surrey, British Columbia, Canada, near Surrey City Hall. The building consists of luxury residences, a hotel (Autograph Collection), offices, retail, and Kwantlen Polytechnic University's Civic Plaza campus, which occupies the first five floors above the open lobby/atrium. It was opened by the Century Group in 2018.

== History ==
The neighbourhood of Whalley/City Centre is home to many of Surrey's skyscrapers, including the redevelopment of Flamingo block. The hotel opened in the first week of April 2018.

At 157.3 meters (516 ft) tall, it is the tallest building in Surrey. It overtook the Central City complex, which had been the tallest building in Surrey since 2003.

== Gallery ==
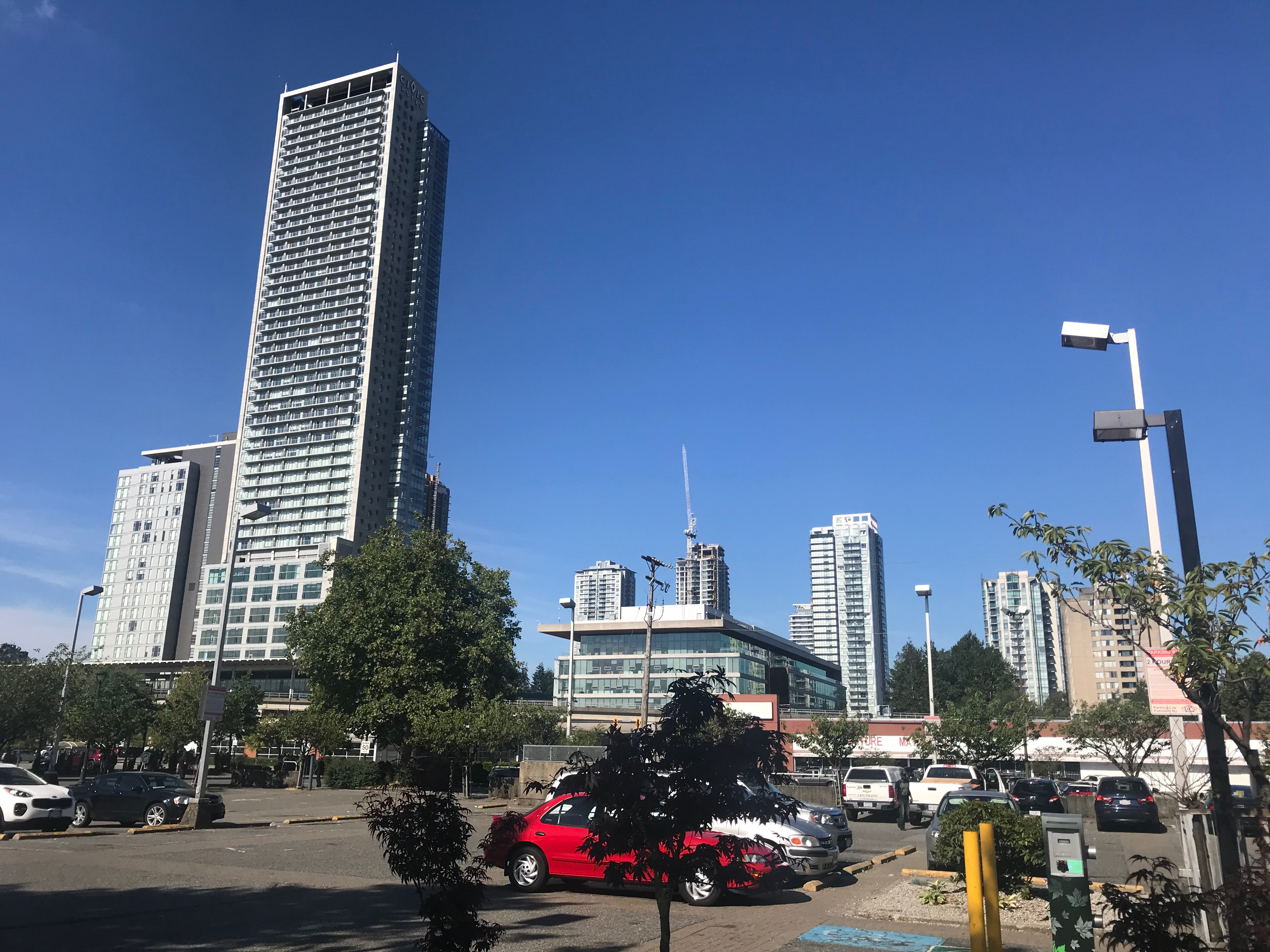
Northern and eastern facades of the skyscraper.

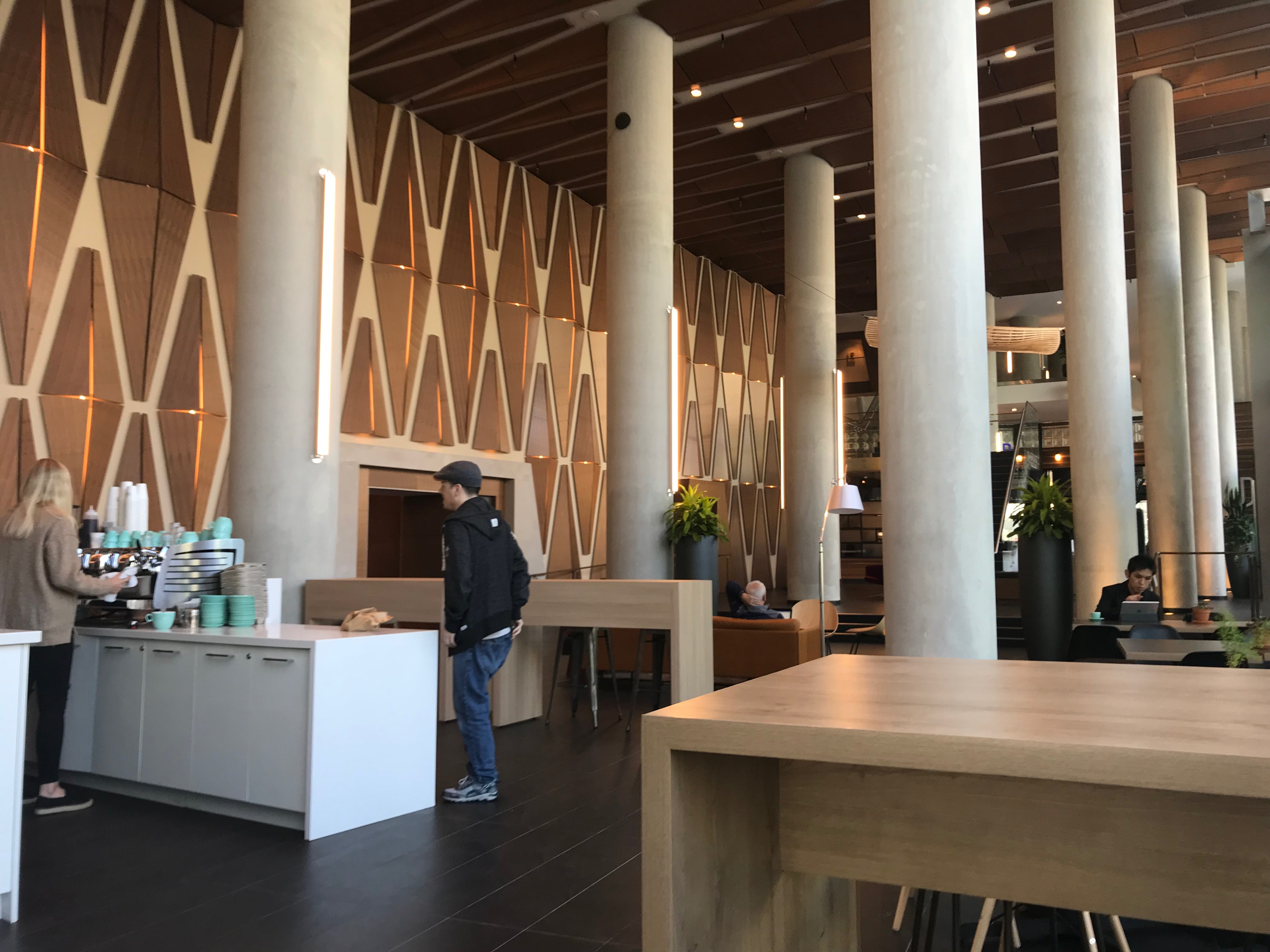
Hotel and residential lobby.

== See also ==
- List of tallest buildings in Surrey
- List of tallest buildings in British Columbia
