= King George Hub =

Mixed-use development

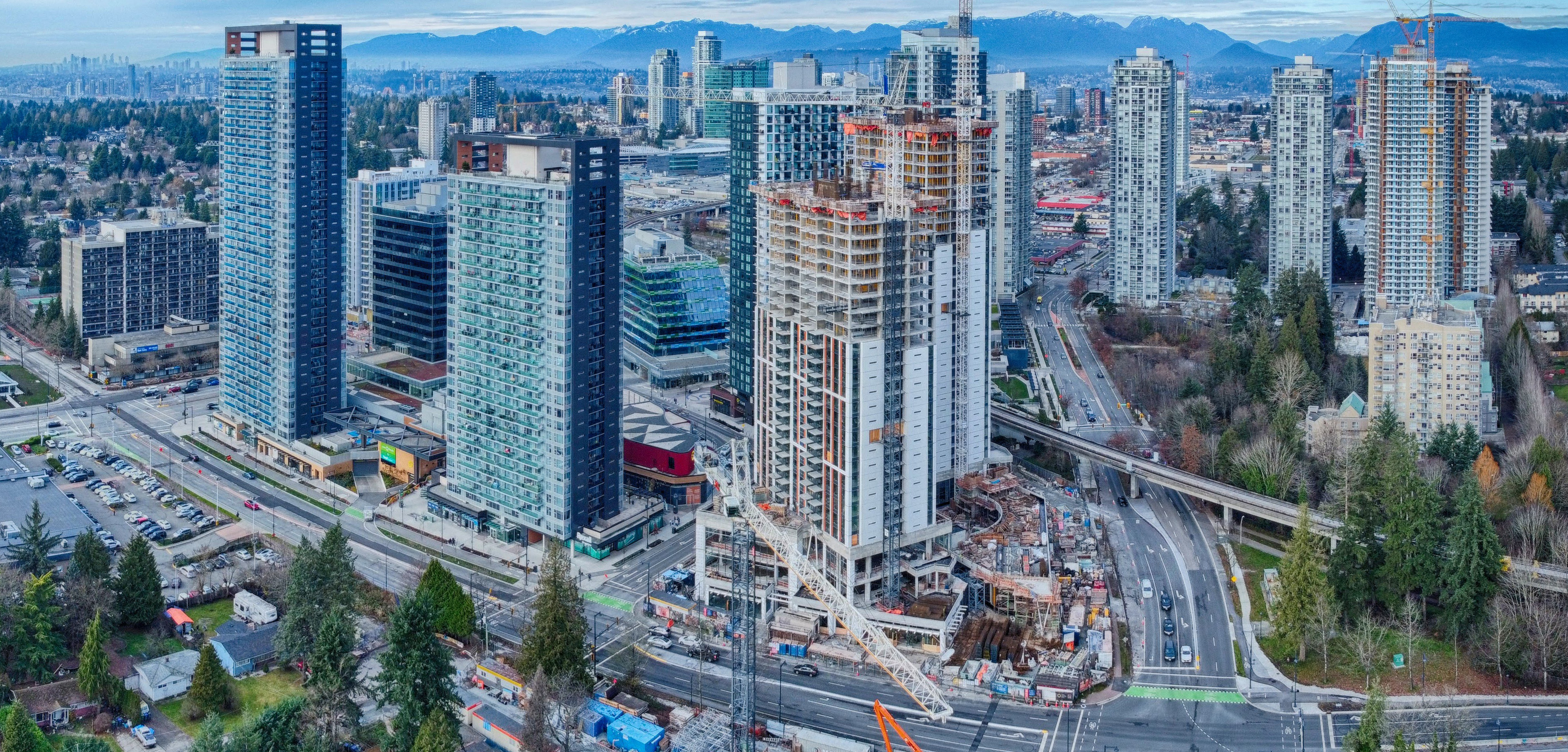
- King George Hub in December 2023
- Interactive map of the King George Hub area

General information
- Status: Open
- Location: Surrey, British Columbia
- Coordinates: 49°10′52″N 122°50′38″W
- Groundbreaking: 2012
- Estimated completion: 2026

Technical details
- Size: 9 acres (3.6 ha)

Design and construction
- Architect: MCM Partnership
- Developer: PCI Group

Other information
- Public transit: King George

Website
- kinggeorgehub.com

King George Hub is a mixed-use development with retail, office and residential high-rises in Surrey, British Columbia, Canada, located at the northeast corner of King George Boulevard and Fraser Highway in the Surrey City Centre district. Developed by the PCI Group and designed by MCM Partnership, the project is located adjacent to the transit hub at King George station.

== History ==
Phase A began construction in 2012 and was completed in early 2016. It houses the headquarters for Coast Capital Savings, a federal credit union. The second phase, which began construction in early 2018, consists of the Hub 9850 office building, and the Hub One and Two residential towers. Phase B was completed in 2021.

Phase C, which began construction in 2019 and completed in late 2021, consists only of the Line residential building. Phase D began construction in 2021. It consists of the Plaza One and Two residential buildings and were both completed in 2025.

Phase E, located on the south side of Fraser Highway, began construction in 2023. It is named Tether and is the second rental-only tower in the complex with an estimated completion date in 2026.

== Buildings ==
=== Hub One ===
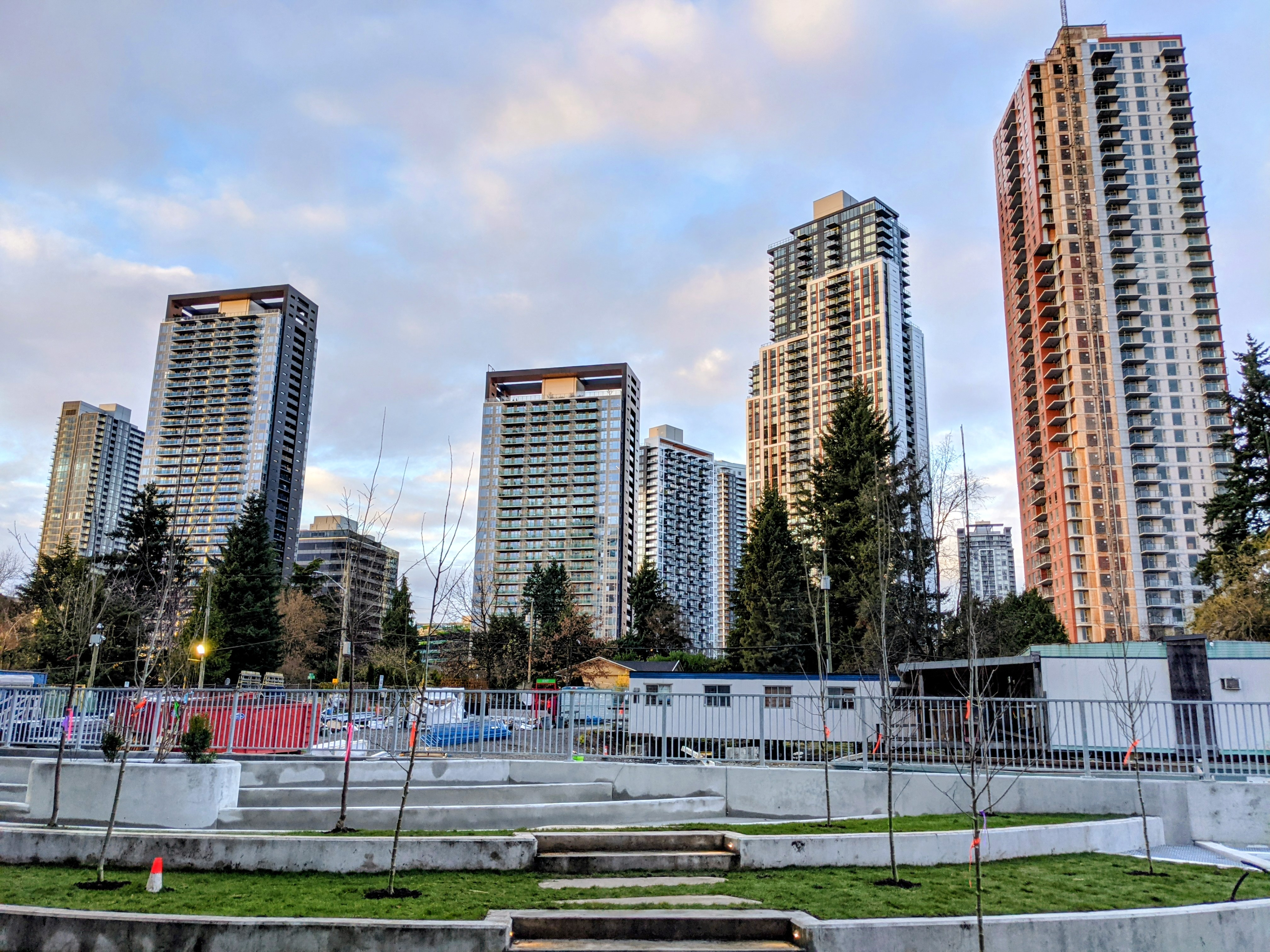
From left to right: Hub One, Hub Two, The Line, Plaza Two, and Tether

Hub One is a residential building located at 13615 Fraser Highway. Completed in 2021, it stands at 130.7 metres (429 ft) tall and is the second tallest building in Surrey.

=== Hub Two ===
Hub Two is a residential building located at 13655 Fraser Highway. Completed in 2021, it stands at 94.8 metres (311 ft) tall.

=== Hub 9850 ===
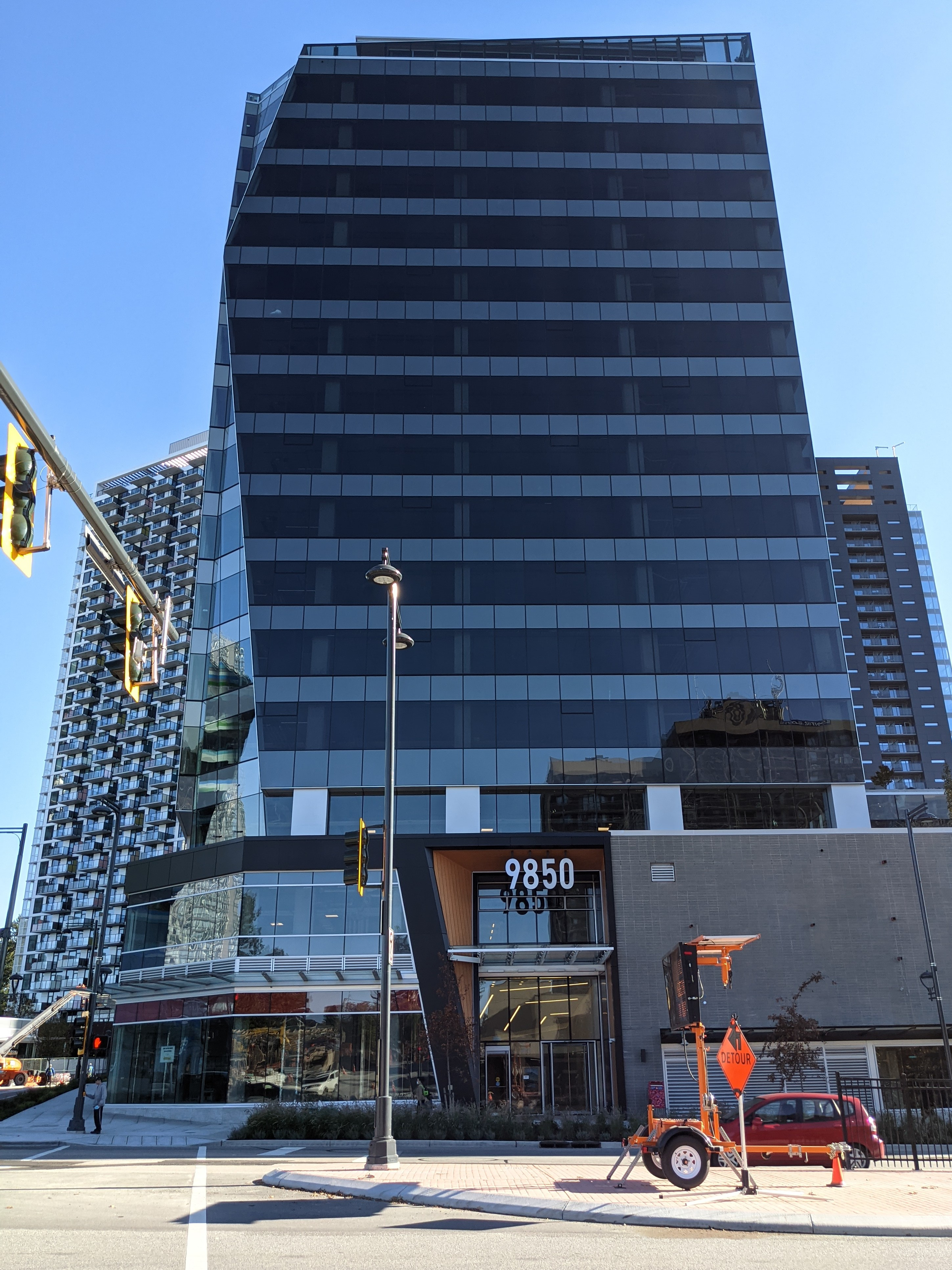
Hub 9850

Hub 9850 is an office building located at 9850 King George Boulevard. Completed in 2021, it stands at 63.1 metres (207 ft) tall. Westland Insurance has occupied the top seven floors of the building since 2022.

=== The Line ===
The Line is a residential building located at 13639 George Junction. Completed in 2021, it stands at 109 metres (358 ft) tall. All units in the building are rentals.

=== Plaza One ===
Plaza One is a residential building located at 13725 George Junction. Completed in 2025, it stands at 130.9 metres (429 ft) tall.

=== Plaza Two ===
Plaza Two is a residential building located at 13745 George Junction. Completed in 2025, it stands at 141.4 metres (464 ft) tall.
