= Fraser Valley Regional Library =

Public library system in British Columbia, Canada

- Established: 1930
- Branches: 25

Collection
- Items collected: Books, CDs, DVDs, Online Resources
- Size: 1,318,502

Access and use
- Population served: 700,000
- Members: 360,620

Other information
- Website: www.fvrl.bc.ca

Fraser Valley Regional Library (FVRL) is a public library system in British Columbia, Canada, with 25 community libraries serving a population of 778,000, including over 360,000 library cardholders. Established in 1930, it is governed by a board of elected officials who represent 15 municipalities and regional districts.

== History ==
Fraser Valley Regional Library (FVRL) was established in 1930 in the Fraser Valley area of British Columbia (BC).

In 1927, the Provincial Public Library Commission organized a province-wide survey of library services in BC. From FVRL's website,

The key finding from the survey was that large administrative library districts based on cooperation and resource sharing between municipalities and school districts should be created to serve BC’s rural communities that could not afford to provide a library service on their own.

=== Demonstration project, 1930-1934 ===
As a result of the survey, the Commission secured a $100,000 grant from the Carnegie Corporation of New York to establish and maintain a rural library project for five years. In 1930, the library’s first director, Dr. Helen Gordon Stewart, launched the Fraser Valley Book Van, which served as the public library to the rural residents from Ladner to Hope. This traveling library displayed books along its outside shelves and travelled through the valley to small towns and villages, stopping at grocery stores, schoolhouses, and gas stations. The Book Van system operated in conjunction with local libraries in located in the larger towns throughout the valley. It covered an area of approximately 2,600 square km, containing 24 separate governing bodies. Administrative headquarters for the project were located in New Westminster, while Chilliwack served as the main distribution center.

=== Creation of the Fraser Valley Union Library ===
To continue library services for the Fraser Valley after the Carnegie funds were exhausted, residents were asked to vote whether they wished to support the library through local taxes. A referendum was scheduled for January 1934. The timing was difficult since taxpayers were asked to vote in favour of higher taxes during a severe economic depression. Stewart and her staff launched a massive campaign of public meetings, handouts, posters, and newspaper articles to gain support. Twenty of the original 24 areas voted "yes" so the Fraser Valley Union Library created the first regional library system in North America. The first operating budget was established by the board at a per capita rate of 35 cents.

The resources of the Carnegie Demonstration Project were turned over to the new Library Board of Management on September 28, 1934, during a ceremony held in Chilliwack, BC. At this time, Stewart left the Fraser Valley to organize other regional libraries. Soon after, the library headquarters was relocated to its present location in Abbotsford, British Columbia.

=== Present day ===
In 1951, the official name was changed to the Fraser Valley Regional Library District (FVRL). FVRL is the largest public library system in British Columbia.

FVRL is governed by a board of directors and financially supported by its member municipalities and through a Government of BC operating grant. Board members are elected officials of its member municipalities.

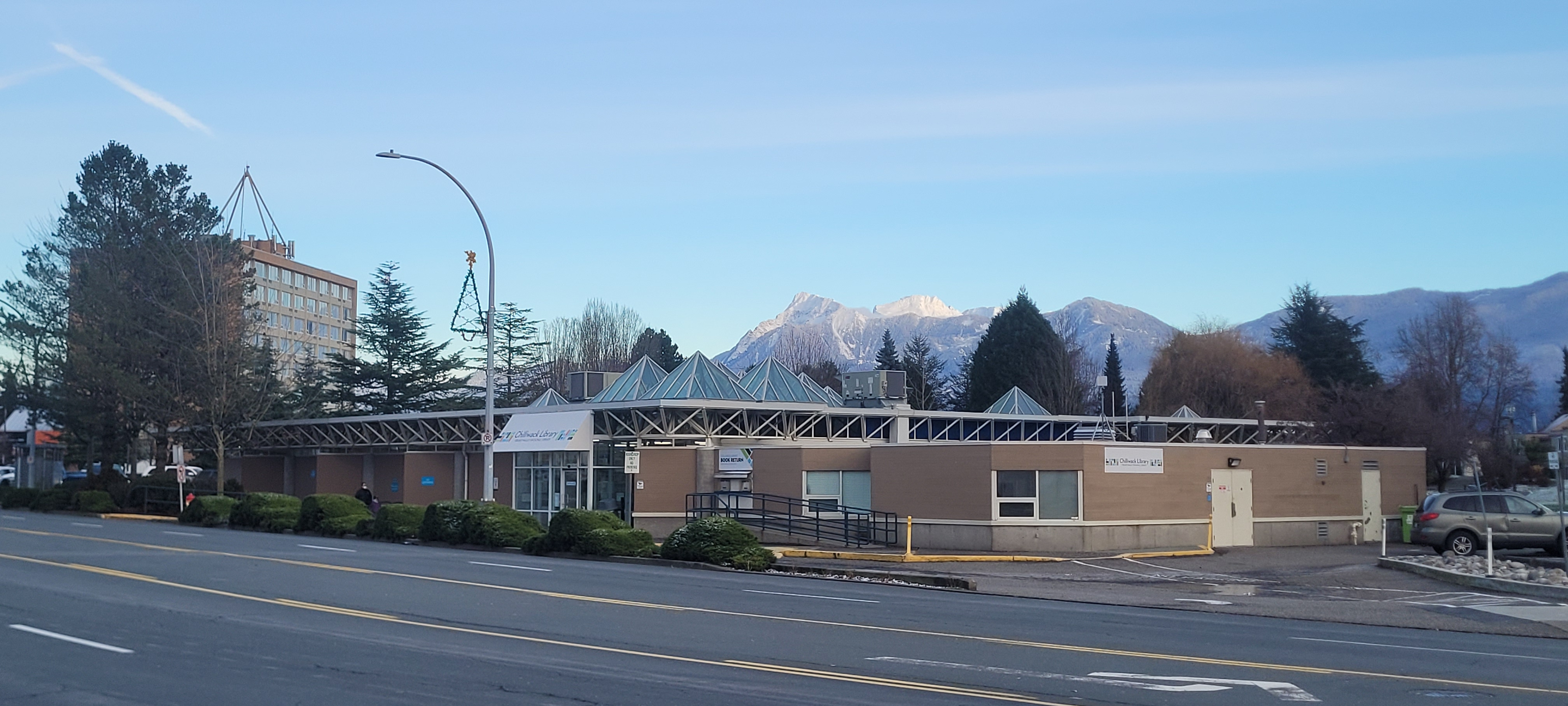
Fraser Valley Regional Library based in Chilliwack, British Columbia. Located on First Avenue. Mount Cheam can be seen in the background.

== Special collections ==
=== World Languages ===
The FVRL has allotted $80,000 per year to its World Languages Collection, which provides both adult and children's fiction and non-fiction books, DVDs, and CDs in languages other than English. The collection is split between the 24 branches and consists of over 42,000 items in 14 languages.

== Lifelong learning programs ==
FVRL supports lifelong learning and literacy. To promote ongoing learning and literacy within the community FVRL offers various programs and workshops for all age groups from toddlers to seniors. Programs include:

- Storytimes
- Author readings
- Computer and Internet classes
- Credit management
- Family reading clubs
- How to write a will

== Awards ==
Year	Award	Giver
2011	People's Choice Award (Chilliwack Library)	Harrison Agassiz Chamber of Commerce
2011	Inclusive Environment Award (Chilliwack Library)	Fraser Valley Cultural Diversity Awards
2011	Merit Award for Programs & Services (for the Festival of Aboriginal Arts)	BC Library Association
2011	Sheila Nickols Heritage Achievement Award for Community History and Heritage Teaching (Maple Ridge Library)	District of Maple Ridge
2009	Merit Award for Programs & Services (for Aboriginal Outreach Services)	BC Library Association
2006	Merit Award for Programs (for the Reading Link Challenge)	BC Library Association
2006	Marketing Award (Aldergrove Library)	Fraser Valley Cultural Diversity Awards
2006	Innovator of the Year Award (for launch of Live Homework Help)	Tutor.com
2006	W. Kaye Lambe Award for Services to Seniors (Maple Ridge Library)	Canadian Library Association and Ex Libris Association

== Locations ==
FVRL has an Administrative Centre located in Abbotsford and 25 community branches located in 14 municipalities.

Municipality	Library Branches
Abbotsford	Abbotsford Community, Clearbrook, Mount Lehman
Agassiz	Agassiz
Boston Bar	Boston Bar
Chilliwack	Chilliwack, Sardis, Yarrow
Delta	Ladner Pioneer, George Mackie, Tsawwassen
Hope	Hope
City of Langley	City of Langley
Township of Langley	Aldergrove, Brookswood, Dean Drysdale, Fort Langley, Muriel Arnason, Murrayville
Maple Ridge	Maple Ridge
Mission	Mission
Pitt Meadows	Pitt Meadows
Port Coquitlam	Terry Fox
White Rock	White Rock
Yale	Yale
