= Gateway station (SkyTrain) =

Metro Vancouver SkyTrain station

Gateway
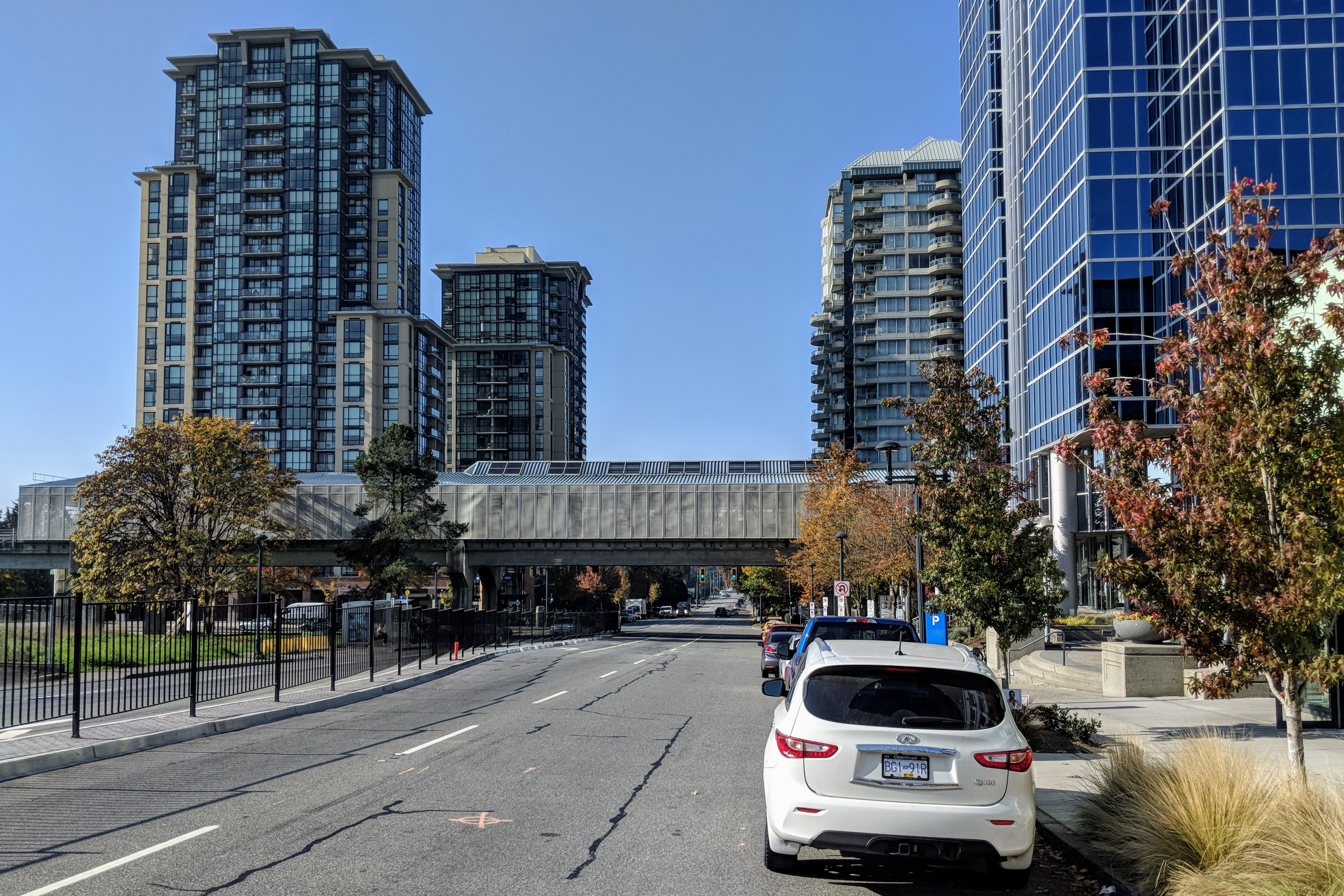
- Gateway station viewed from the east

General information
- Location: 13401 108 Avenue; Surrey, British Columbia; Canada
- Coordinates: 49.198945°N 122.850559°W
- System: SkyTrain station
- Owner: TransLink
- Platforms: Centre platform
- Tracks: 2

Construction
- Structure type: Elevated
- Accessible: yes

Other information
- Station code: GW
- Fare zone: 3

History
- Opened: March 28, 1994; 32 years ago

Passengers
- 2025: 2,203,000 ▼1.1%
- Rank: 27 of 54

Services
Preceding station	TransLink	Following station
Scott Road towards Waterfront	Expo Line Surrey branch	Surrey Central towards King George
Location

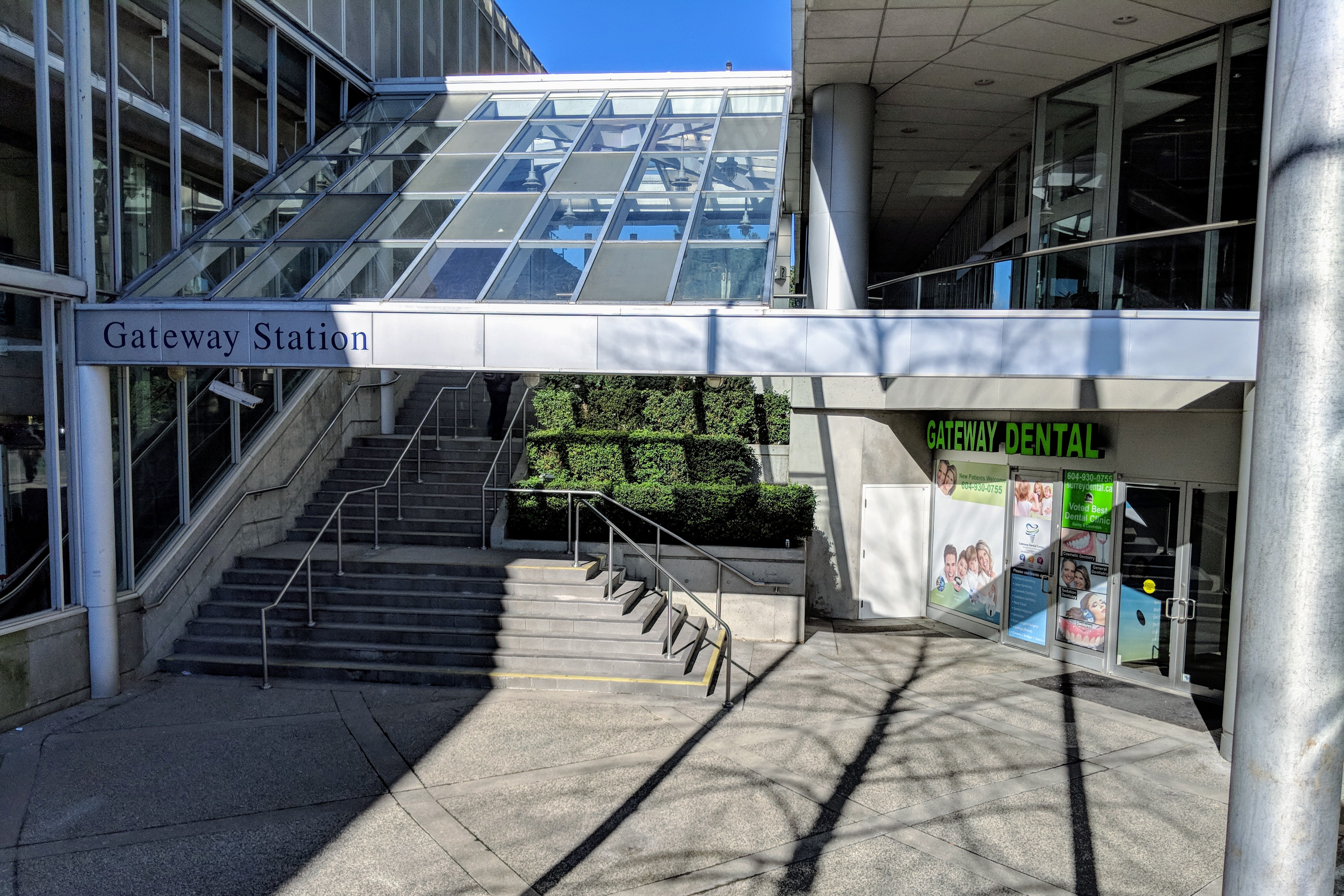
The main entrance to Gateway is adjacent to Station Tower.

Gateway is an elevated station on the Expo Line of Metro Vancouver's SkyTrain rapid transit system. The station is located at the intersection of 108 Avenue and University Drive in the Surrey City Centre district of Surrey, British Columbia, Canada. Connections to bus routes servicing Guildford and Newton town centres can be made at this station.

== History ==
Gateway station was built in 1994 as part of the second extension of the original SkyTrain system (now known as the Expo Line). This extension was built to serve Surrey City Centre and included three stations; Gateway, Surrey Central and King George stations, the latter being the terminus of the Expo Line branch to Surrey.

== Station information ==
=== Entrances ===
Gateway station is served by two entrances. The west entrance is located adjacent to University Drive and is an elevator-only entrance that provides access for the disabled. The second entrance is located on the east along 108 Avenue and is next to Station Tower.

=== Transit connections ===
Bus bay assignments are as follows:

Bay	Route number	Destination
1	373	Surrey Central Station
2	335	Surrey Central Station
2	371	Surrey Central Station
2	373	Surrey Central Station
3	335	Newton Exchange (Some trips to Guildford only)
3	371	Scott Road Station
3	373	Guildford
