= Central City (Surrey, British Columbia) =

Mixed-use development in British Columbia, Canada

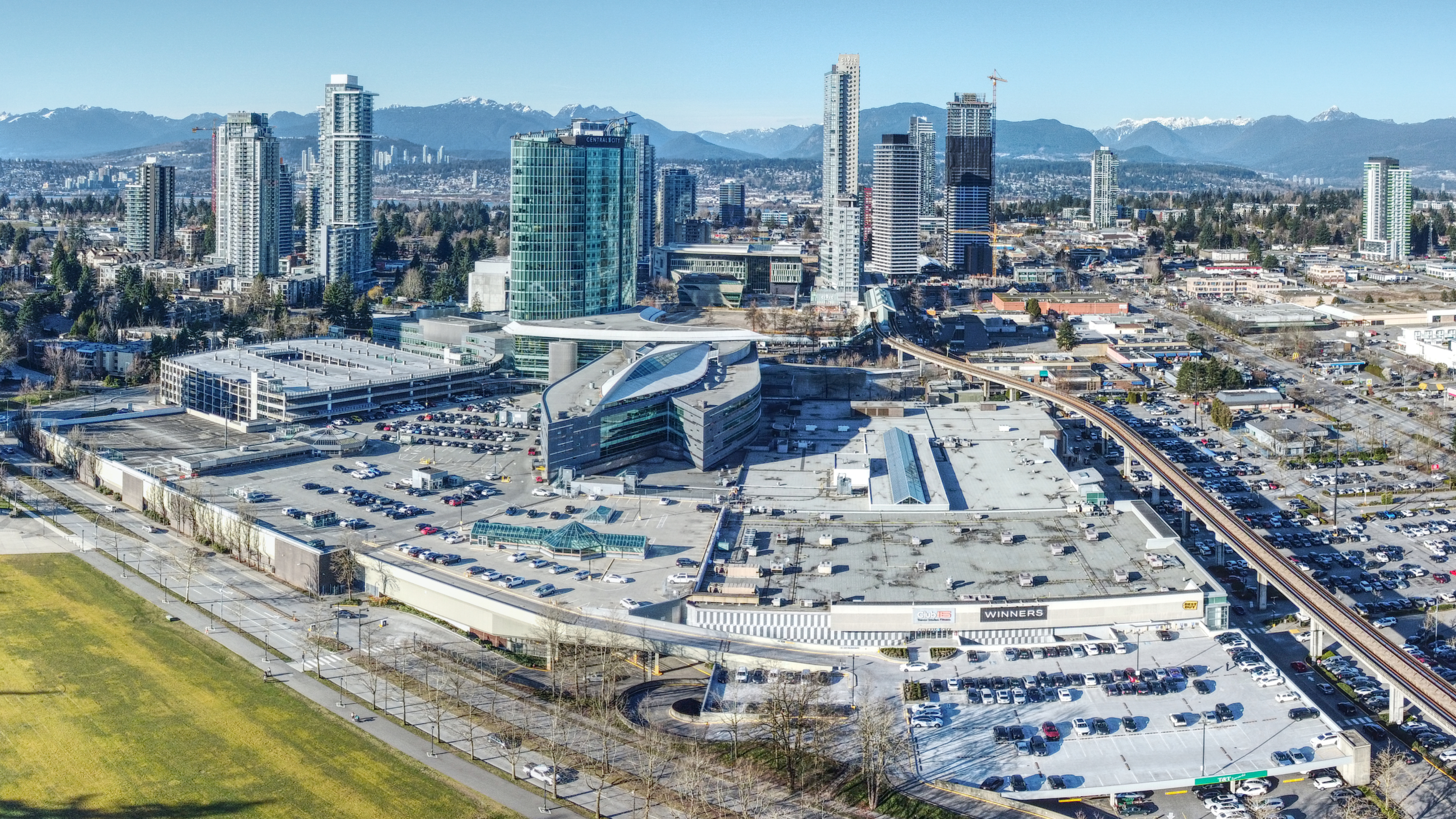
- View of the complex from Holland Park

General information
- Architectural style: Postmodern
- Location: 10153 King George Boulevard; Surrey, British Columbia, Canada
- Coordinates: 49°11′15″N 122°50′59″W
- Opening: August 1972; 54 years ago
- Owner: Blackwood Partners Management Corporation

Height
- Architectural: 118.9 m (390 ft)

Technical details
- Floor count: 2 (mall); 5 (university); 26 (mall and office tower combined)
- Floor area: 57,370 m^{2} (617,500 sq ft)

Design and construction
- Architect: Bing Thom Architects

Other information
- Number of stores: 132
- Number of anchors: 5–7

Website
- centralcity.ca

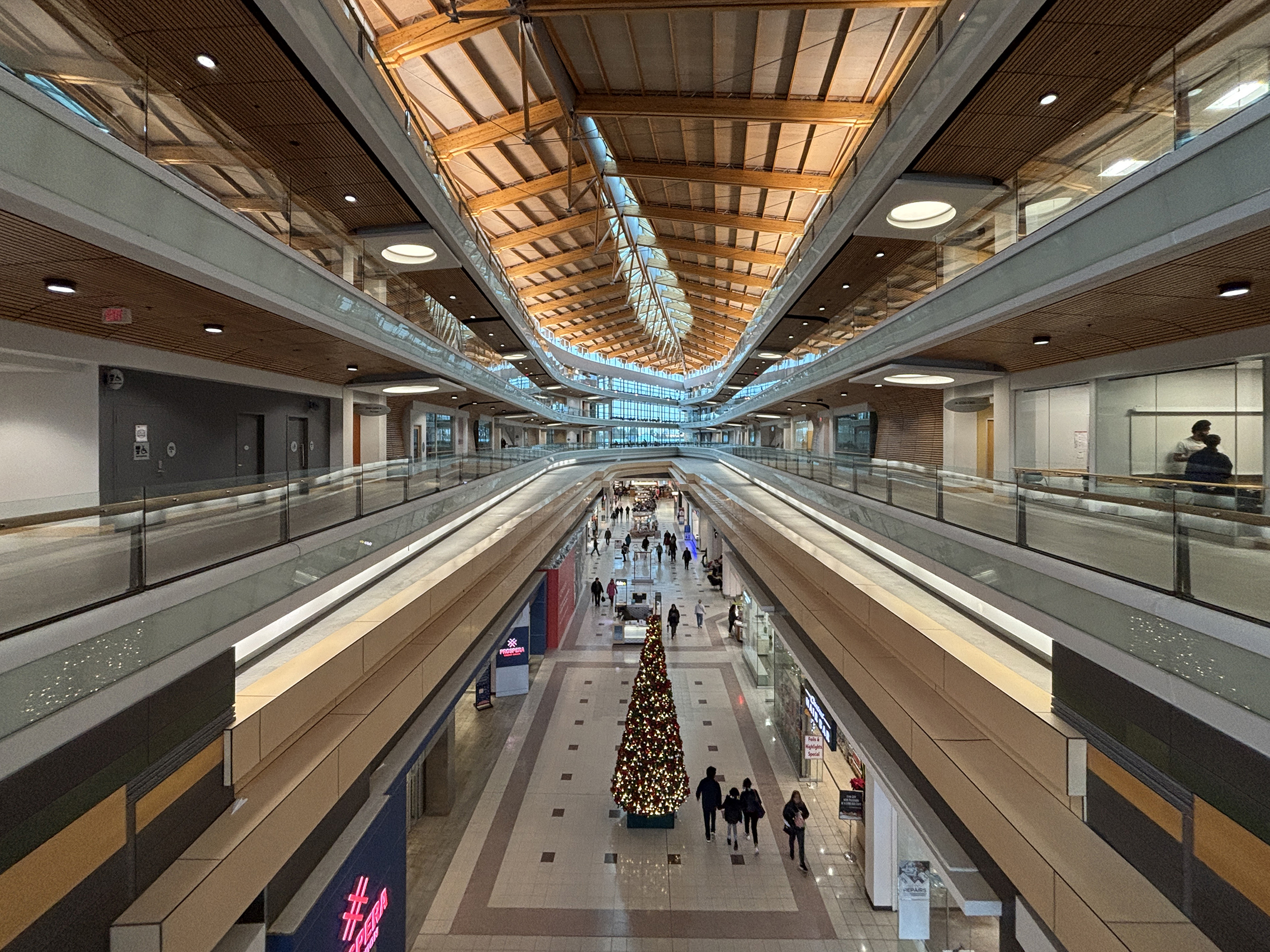
Central City Shopping Centre in the lower level and Simon Fraser University located in upper level of the building

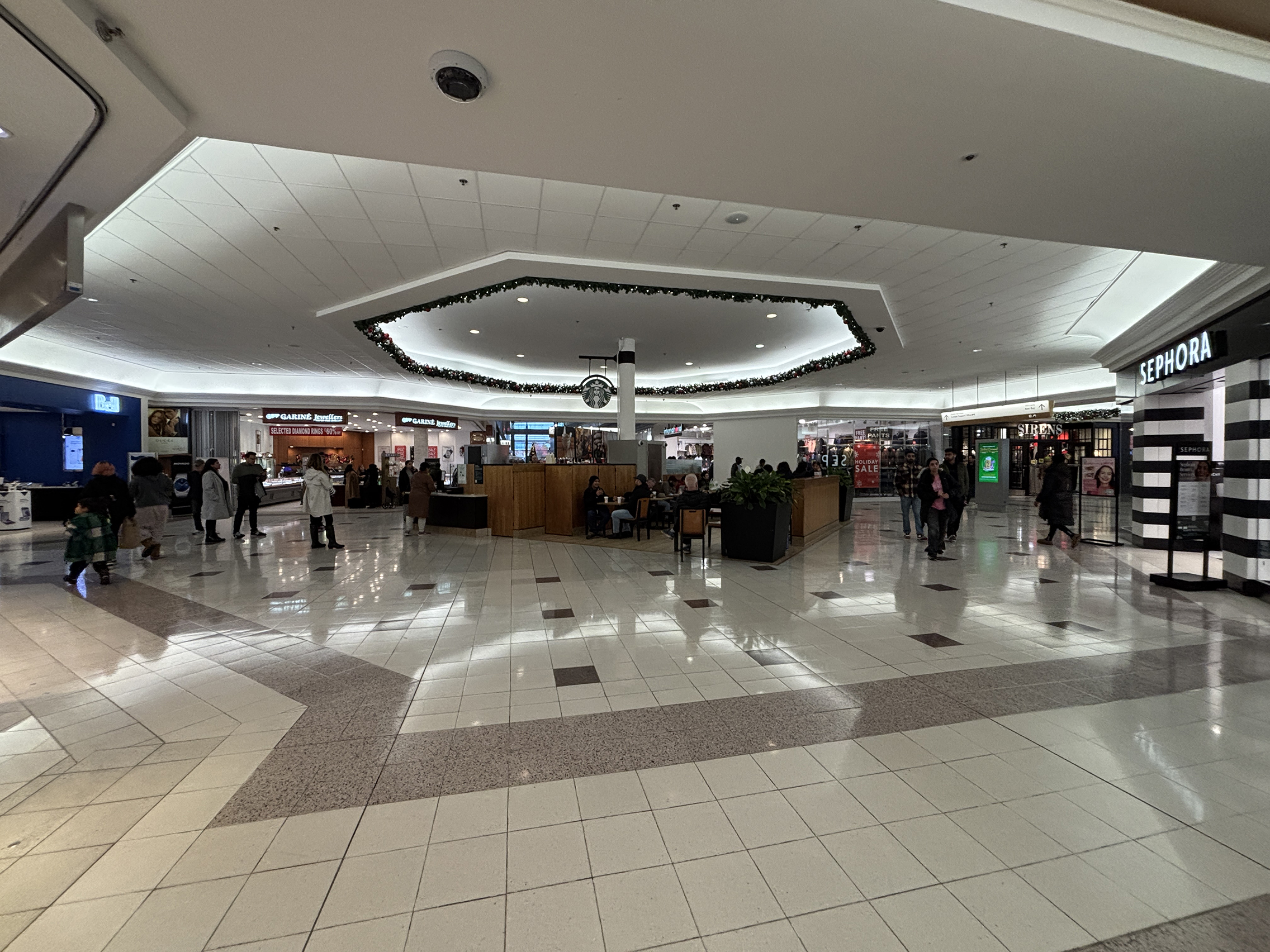
Interior of the mall

Central City (formerly known as Surrey Place Mall) is a mixed-use development that houses a shopping mall, a university campus and an office tower complex in Surrey, British Columbia, Canada. It is owned by Blackwood Partners Management Corporation.

The Central City tower, main entrance and galleria were designed by Bing Thom Architects. The tower houses one of the three Simon Fraser University campuses. The complex is located near two SkyTrain stations – Surrey Central and King George – and is the second-largest shopping centre in Surrey after Guildford Town Centre.

== History and development ==
Originally, the shopping centre was built in the 1970s as Surrey Place Mall, a standalone shopping centre, and was managed and owned by the Insurance Corporation of British Columbia. It underwent renovations and refurbishments throughout the 1980s and 1990s; however, the popularity of Guildford Town Centre began to challenge the mall's position as a dominant shopping centre in Surrey. In the late 1990s, the foot traffic of the mall suffered severely and many stores became untenanted. However, in 1999, part of the mall was sold off and was redeveloped, with the addition of an expansion to the mall including a new podium and a high-rise office tower also known as the Central City tower. From 2003 to 2017, the Central City tower was the tallest building in Surrey. In 2007, the rest of Central City mall was sold to Blackwood Partners Management Corporation.

The mall was affected by the closings of Target Canada and Future Shop, but Walmart Canada took over Target Canada's location along with Future Shop's former Best Buy–branded location. As of 2016, given the mixed use of the complex—which includes space dedicated to retail, educational, and office uses—along with an increase in residential condominium density in the surrounding area, the mall has become busier than it was in the preceding decade.

== Anchor tenants ==
=== Current ===
- Walmart
- Winners
- Best Buy
- The Brick
- Shoppers Drug Mart
- Simon Fraser University
- T & T Supermarket
- Dollarama

=== Former ===
- Zellers – in former The Bay location, closed February 11, 2013; was replaced by Target on November 13, 2013
- The Bay – closed May 8, 2000, Zellers relocated in this space, now Walmart
- Sears – closed June 4, 2005, (now T & T Supermarket)
- Target – in former Zellers location, (opened November 13, 2013, closed April 1, 2015); replaced by Walmart on February 25, 2016
- Future Shop – closed March 28, 2015, due to consolidation as Best Buy; reopened as Best Buy in late 2015
- Bed Bath & Beyond – closed January 2020

== Simon Fraser University ==
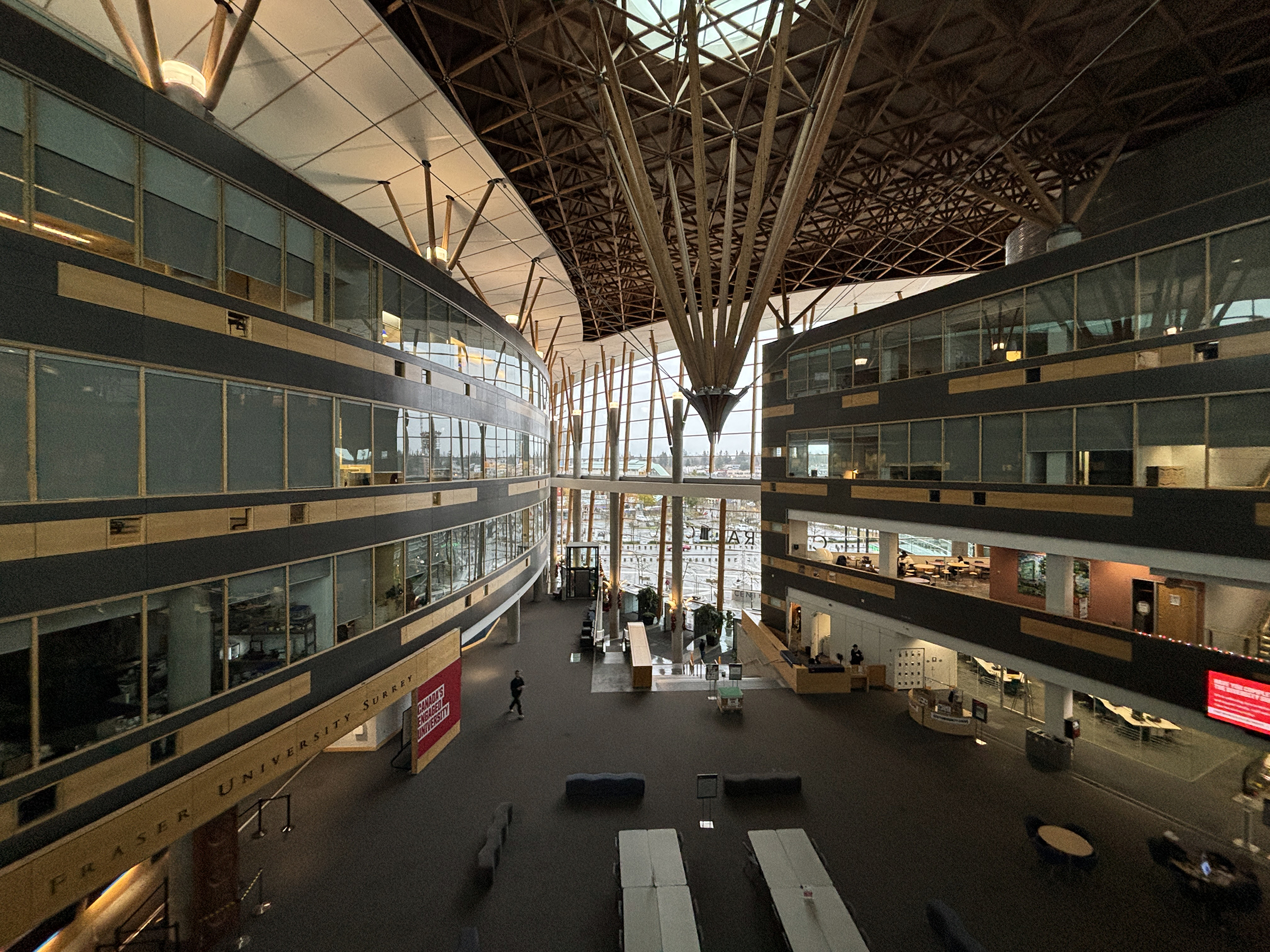
Grand Hall

Unlike other shopping centres in the region, and owing to its unique two-stage development, the main building of Simon Fraser University's Surrey campus is located within the mall and occupies a major portion (33,000 m^{2} [350,000 sq ft]) of the podium floors. The central atrium of the mall, similar to the hull of a ship, consists of retail space on the ground floor and provides a direct line of sight towards the campus hallways and classrooms on the upper floors.

== Transportation ==
Central City Shopping Centre is accessible to the regional SkyTrain system, with the closest station being Surrey Central station. The terminus King George station is also within five minutes' walking distance to the south. The Surrey Central bus loop is adjacent to Surrey Central station and serves as a transfer point to several routes which serve the region.

== Gallery ==
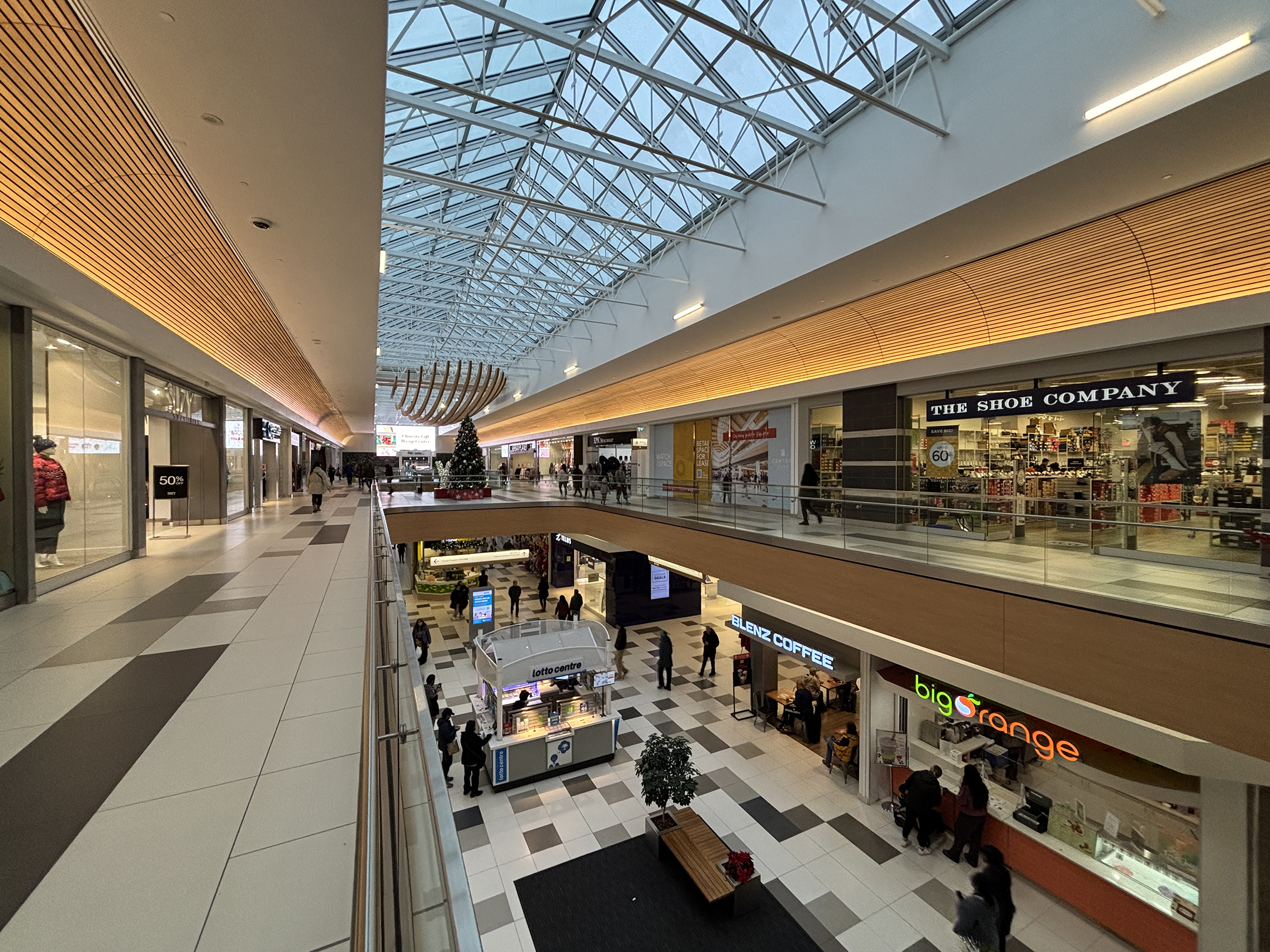
Central City's interiors

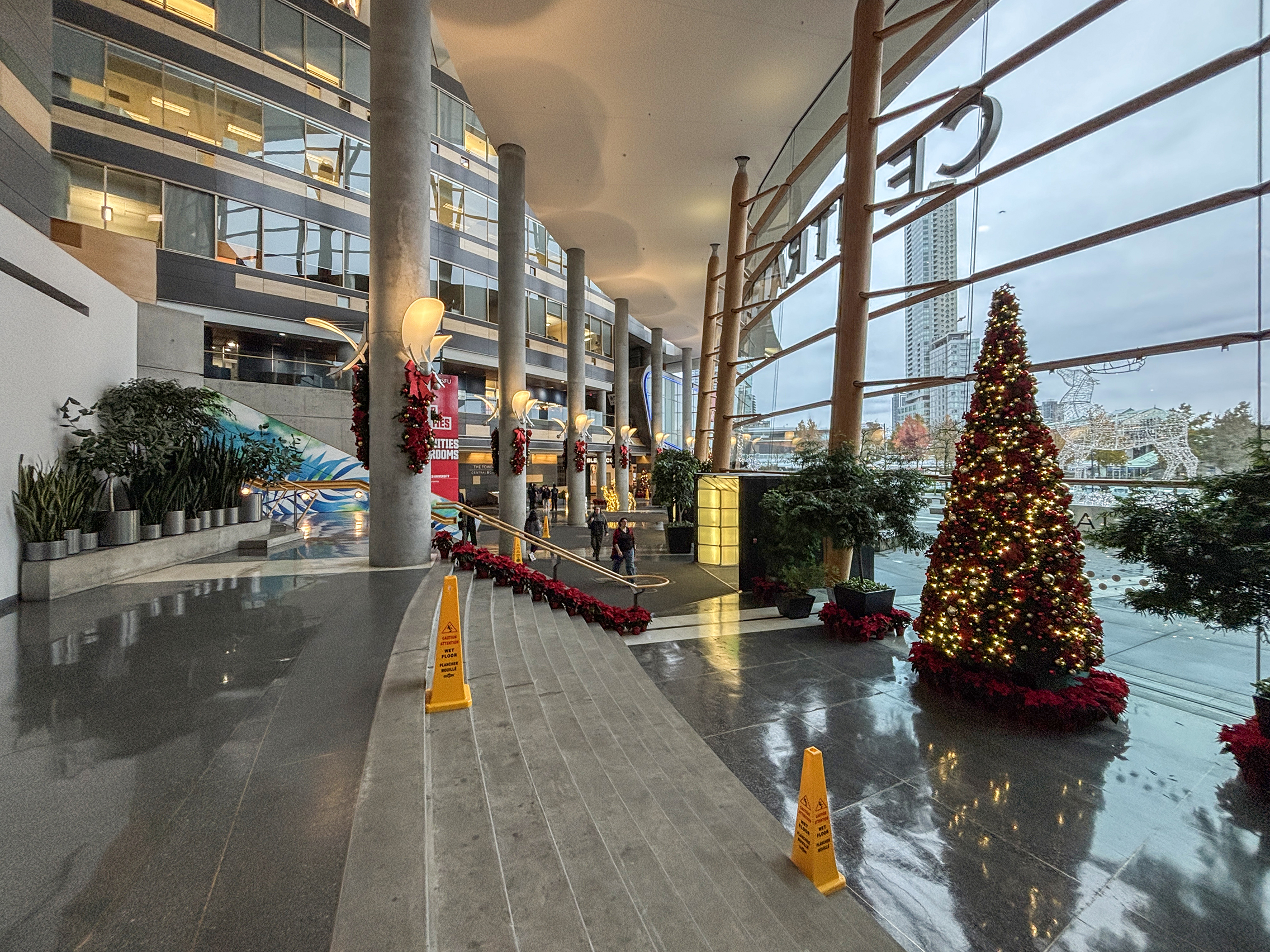
Entrance void

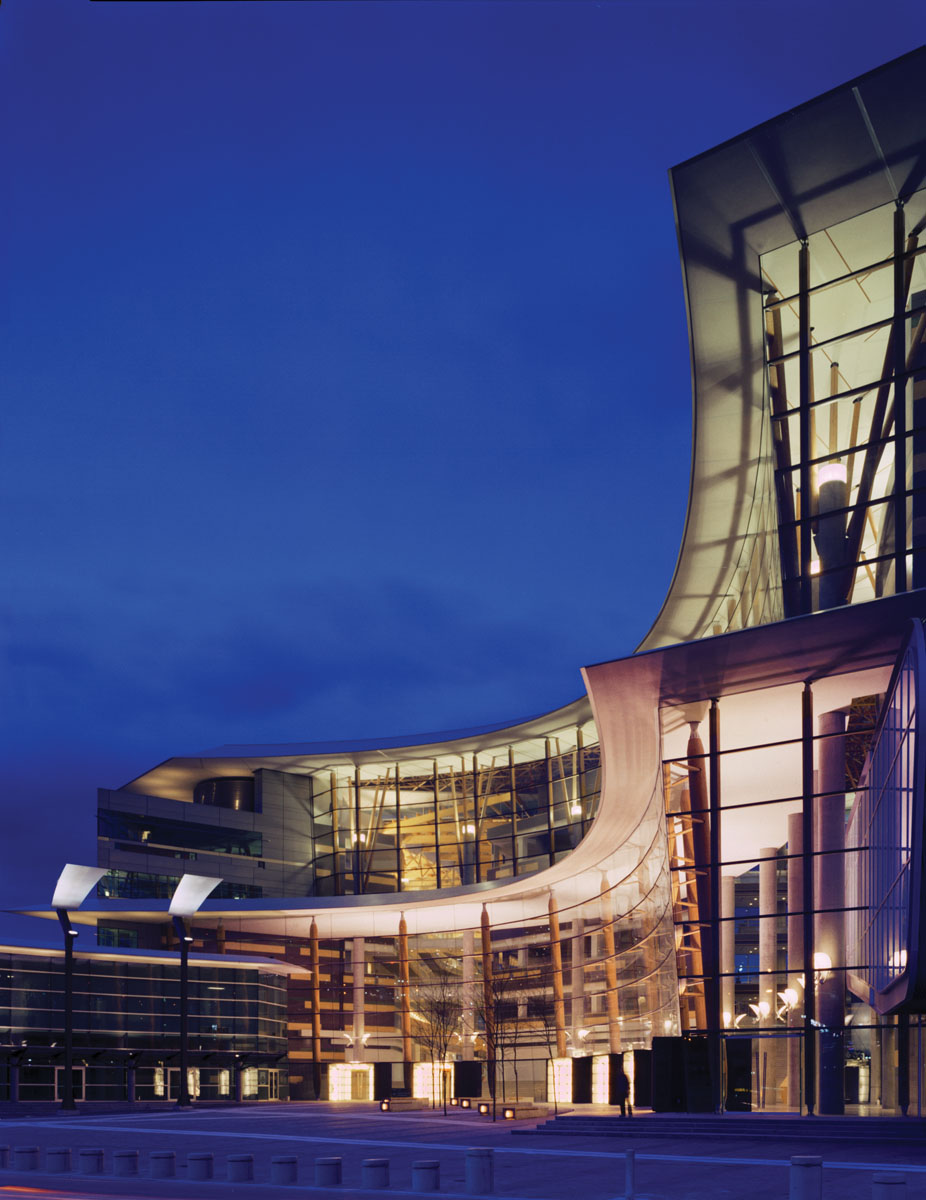
Central City entrance

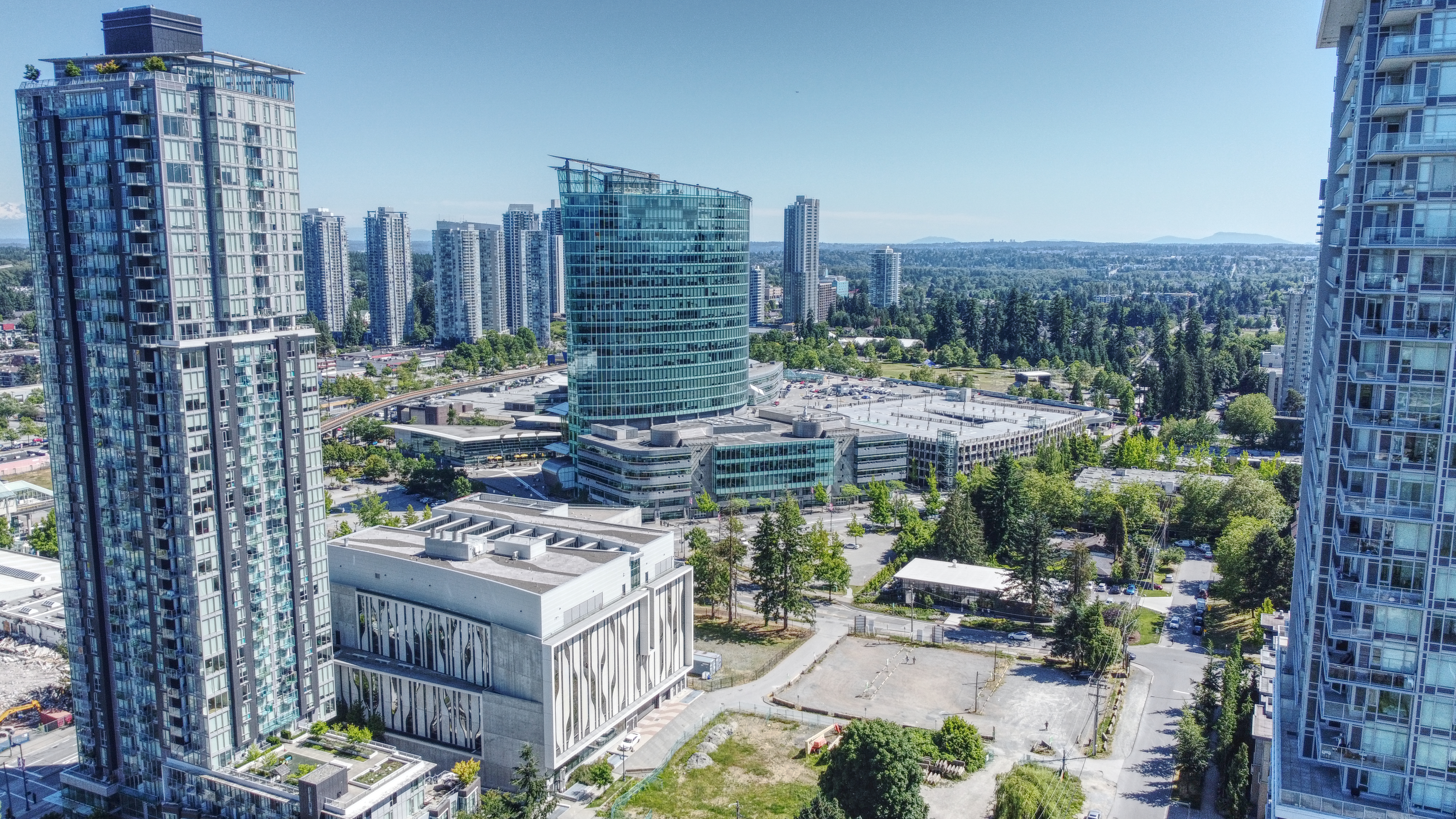
Central City viewed from a high-rise tower

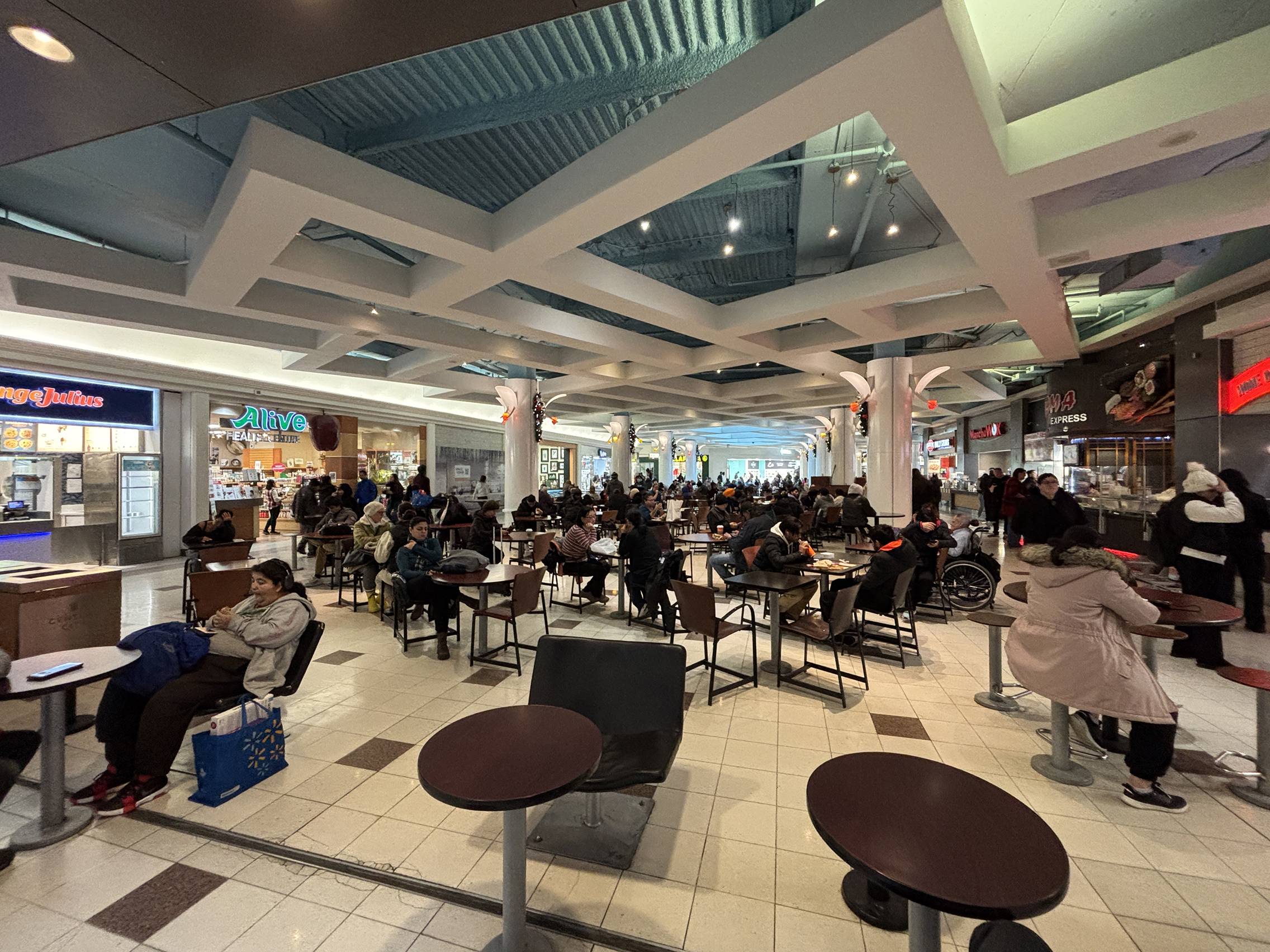
Food court looking east

== See also ==
- List of tallest buildings in Surrey
- List of tallest buildings in British Columbia
