= List of transit exchanges in Metro Vancouver =

The following is a list of current bus loops and transit exchanges in Metro Vancouver.

== Exchanges ==
Exchange	Zone (Note: The TransLink fare structure is based on a zone system. Municipalities are located in one of three transit zones, and non-bus fares are calculated based on the number of zones travelled. Since October 5, 2015, travel on all TransLink buses requires only one-zone fares.)	Municipality	Year	Parking	Connection(s)
Blanca Loop	Zone 1	University Endowment Lands	1930	No	
Capilano University Exchange	Zone 2	North Vancouver	2009	No	
Carvolth Exchange	Zone 3	Langley	2012	Yes	66 Fraser Valley Express
Dunbar Loop	Zone 1	Vancouver	1950	No	R4 41st Ave
Guildford Exchange	Zone 3	Surrey	1975	No	R1 King George Blvd
Haney Place Exchange	Zone 3	Maple Ridge	2008	No	R3 Lougheed Hwy
Kootenay Loop	Zone 1	Vancouver	1950	No	R5 Hastings St
Ladner Exchange	Zone 3	Delta	1978	Yes	
Langley Centre	Zone 3	Langley	1975	No	
Lynn Valley Centre	Zone 2	North Vancouver	2020	No	
Lonsdale Quay	Zone 2	North Vancouver	1977	No	R2 Marine Dr
Marpole Loop	Zone 1	Vancouver	1905	No	
Newton Exchange	Zone 3	Surrey	1975	No	R1 King George Blvd
NightBus Downtown Terminus	Zone 1	Vancouver	2003	No	
Park Royal Exchange	Zone 2	West Vancouver	1959	Yes	R2 Marine Dr
Phibbs Exchange	Zone 2	North Vancouver	1973	Yes	R2 Marine Dr
Scottsdale Exchange	Zone 3	Surrey	1975	No	
SFU Exchange	Zone 2	Burnaby	1965	No	R5 Hastings St
South Delta Exchange	Zone 3	Delta	1975	Yes	
South Surrey Park and Ride	Zone 3	Surrey	1991	Yes	
Stanley Park Loop	Zone 1	Vancouver	2003	No	
Steveston Exchange	Zone 2	Richmond	2020	No	
UBC Exchange	Zone 1	UBC Vancouver	1945	No	99 B-Line; R4 41st Ave
White Rock Centre	Zone 3	Surrey/White Rock	1975	No	
