= List of bus routes in Metro Vancouver =

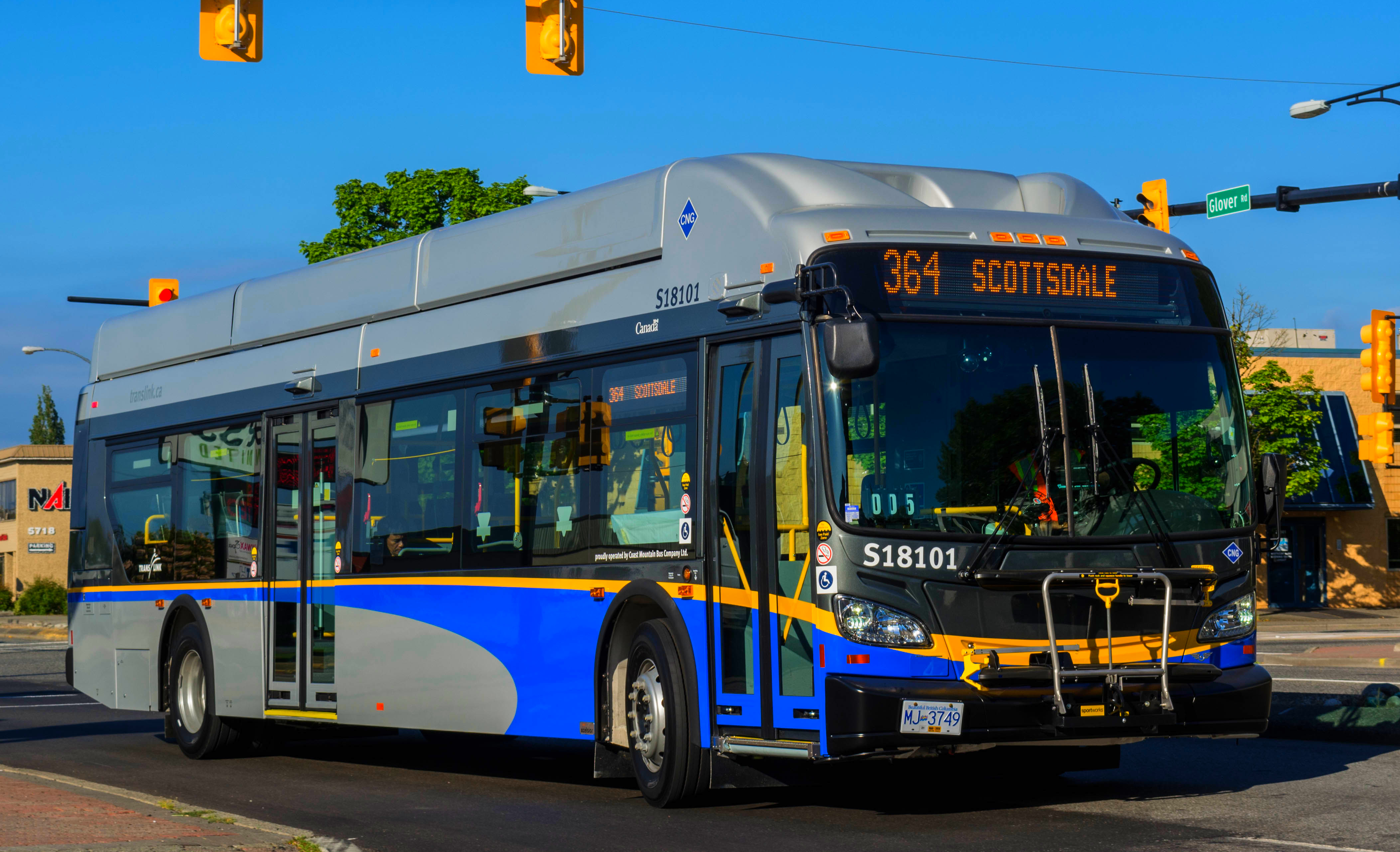
New Flyer XN40 on route 364

The following list of current bus routes in Metro Vancouver is sorted by region and route number.

Routes with trolleybuses, articulated buses or suburban highway buses are noted as such. All route destination names are based on the official TransLink bus schedules. All routes are operated by Coast Mountain Bus Company except:

- Routes 214 (off-peak only), 215, 227, 250–256 and 262 (operated by West Vancouver Blue Bus)
- Routes 280–282, 370, 372, and 560–564 (operated by First Transit)

This list is effective as of September 7, 2026. In 2025, the system had a ridership of 203,373,000, or about 601,000 per weekday as of the second quarter of 2026.

== Notes and explanations ==
=== General notes ===
- Peak hours – Monday through Friday
- * – Peak hour trips only
- # – Limited or select trips only
- [DOWNTOWN] – Route serves downtown Vancouver
- [TAG] (without text directly following) – tag applies to route
- [TAG] (followed by text) – tag applies to route as per the text that follows

=== Tag legend ===
- Bus/route types:
  - [CONVENTIONAL] (default) – Operates mostly or always with 12.2-metre (40 ft) buses
  - [TROLLEY] – Operates mostly or always with 12.2-metre (40 ft) trolley buses (or 18.3-metre (60 ft) with addition of [ARTICULATED])
  - [COACH] – Operates mostly or always with 12.2-metre (40 ft) highway coach buses
  - [COMMUNITY SHUTTLE] – Operates mostly or always with community shuttle minibuses
  - [ARTICULATED] – Operates mostly or always with 18.3-metre (60 ft) articulated buses
  - [B-LINE] – Operates high frequency service with limited stops, mostly or always with 18.3-metre (60 ft) articulated buses
  - [RAPIDBUS] – Operates high frequency service with limited stops and transit priority, mostly or always with 18.3-metre (60 ft) articulated buses
- Route specifics:
  - [PEAK ROUTING] – Routing is slightly altered during peak periods (to serve specific locations)
  - [SHARED ROUTE] – Route changes destination without requiring a transfer
  - [LIMITED] – Route operates a limited number of trips
  - [EXPRESS] – Route operates as an express service with limited stops
  - [NO EVENING] – Route does not operate during evenings and/or late evenings
  - [NO WEEKDAY] – Route does not operate on weekdays
  - [NO SUNDAY] – Route does not operate on Sundays and/or holidays
  - [PEAK-ONLY] – Route only operates during peak periods (implies [WEEKDAY-ONLY])
  - [AM PEAK-ONLY] – Route only operates during morning peak periods (implies [WEEKDAY-ONLY])
  - [PM PEAK-ONLY] – Route only operates during evening peak periods (implies [WEEKDAY-ONLY])

=== Connections legend ===
Connections
Expo Line (SkyTrain)	Expo Line
	Millennium Line
	Canada Line
	SeaBus
	West Coast Express

== Regular routes by region ==
=== Vancouver/UBC ===
Route	Termini		Connections	Notes	Source
R4	UBC	Joyce–Collingwood Station	Oakridge–41st Avenue; Joyce–Collingwood	[RAPIDBUS]	
2	Burrard Station	Dunbar Loop 16th Avenue; 16th Avenue at Musqueam View	[DOWNTOWN] Burrard	Select trips from Burrard station short turn at 16th Avenue at Musqueam View	
3	Waterfront Station	Marine Drive Station	[DOWNTOWN] Waterfront; Main Street–Science World; Marine Drive	[TROLLEY] [ARTICULATED] Via Main Street	
4	UBC	Powell; Eton at Renfrew Downtown; Cambie at Hastings	[DOWNTOWN] Granville; Vancouver City Centre; Waterfront	[TROLLEY] [NO EVENING] Powell portion – served by "209 Burrard Station / Upper Lynn Valley".	
5	Downtown; Cambie at Dunsmuir	Robson; Davie at Denman	[DOWNTOWN] Stadium–Chinatown; Waterfront; Granville; Burrard	[TROLLEY] [SHARED ROUTE] Becomes eastbound Route 6 from terminus on Davie at Denman; Becomes westbound Route 6 from terminus on Cambie at Georgia	
6	Downtown; Cambie at Dunsmuir	Davie; Davie at Denman	[DOWNTOWN] Yaletown–Roundhouse; Stadium–Chinatown	[TROLLEY] [SHARED ROUTE] Becomes eastbound Route 5 from terminus on Davie at Denman; Becomes westbound Route 5 from terminus on Cambie at Georgia	
7	Dunbar; Dunbar Loop	Nanaimo Station	[DOWNTOWN] Vancouver City Centre; Granville; Waterfront; Nanaimo	[TROLLEY]	
8	Waterfront Station	SE Marine Drive; Fraser at Southeast Marine Drive	[DOWNTOWN] Waterfront; Main Street–Science World	[TROLLEY] [ARTICULATED] [EVENING-ONLY] Select evening northbound trips terminate at Fraser Street at 41st Avenue Via Fraser Street	
9	UBC; Alma; West Broadway at Alma; To Granville; West Broadway at Granville	Boundary; Boundary Loop	Broadway–City Hall; Commercial–Broadway	[PEAK ROUTING] Between Alma and UBC, September to April; Select westbound trips short turn at West Broadway and Granville Street	
10	Waterfront Station	Marine Drive Station	[DOWNTOWN] Waterfront; Granville; Vancouver City Centre; Marine Drive	[TROLLEY] [ARTICULATED] Most trips [TROLLEY] Select early morning trips continuing as 5 or 6 Via Granville Street	
14	UBC	Hastings; Kootenay Loop Downtown; Homer at Hastings	[DOWNTOWN] Waterfront; Granville; Vancouver City Centre	[TROLLEY] [NO EVENING] Hastings portion.	
15	Olympic Village Station	Cambie; Marine Drive station	Olympic Village; Broadway–City Hall; King Edward; Oakridge–41st Avenue; Langara–49th Avenue; Marine Drive	[SHARED ROUTE] Becomes Route 50 on terminus at Olympic Village station	
16	Arbutus; West 63rd Avenue at Granville	29th Avenue Station	[DOWNTOWN] 29th Avenue; Renfrew; Waterfront; Granville; Vancouver City Centre	[TROLLEY]	
17	Downtown; Robson at Hamilton	Oak; Marine Drive station	[DOWNTOWN] Vancouver City Centre; Granville; Stadium-Chinatown; Broadway–City Hall; Marine Drive	[TROLLEY]	
19	Stanley Park; Stanley Park Loop	Metrotown Station Broadway; Kingsway at East Broadway	[DOWNTOWN] Main Street–Science World; Metrotown	[TROLLEY] Some night trips starting at Metrotown terminate at Kingsway and Joyce Street [SUMMER-ONLY] Some eastbound trips terminate at Kingsway at Broadway	
20	Downtown; Robson at Richards	SE Marine Drive; Harrison Loop	[DOWNTOWN] Vancouver City Centre; Granville; Waterfront; Commercial–Broadway	[TROLLEY] [ARTICULATED][EVENING-ONLY] Select evening northbound trips terminate at Victoria Drive at 41st Avenue	
22	Downtown; Burrard station	Knight; Marine at Knight	[DOWNTOWN] Burrard; Main Street–Science World*; VCC–Clark	[PEAK ROUTING] Some peak hour trips operate via Terminal Avenue and Main Street. [PEAK ROUTING] [LIMITED] Two peak hour trips extend to Jacombs Road and Rowan Place in Richmond	
23	English Bay; Morton at Beach	Main Street Station	[DOWNTOWN] Yaletown–Roundhouse; Stadium–Chinatown; Main Street–Science World		
25	UBC	Brentwood Station	King Edward; Nanaimo; Brentwood Town Centre	[ARTICULATED]	
26	29th Avenue Station	Joyce–Collingwood Station	29th Avenue; Joyce–Collingwood		
27	Kootenay Loop	Joyce–Collingwood Station	Rupert; Joyce–Collingwood		
28	Phibbs Exchange	Joyce–Collingwood Station	Gilmore; Joyce–Collingwood		
29	29th Avenue Station	Elliott; Muirfield at Scarboro	29th Avenue		
31	River District; Sawmill Cres. at River District Crossing	Metrotown Station	Metrotown	[COMMUNITY SHUTTLE]	
33	UBC	29th Avenue Station	King Edward; 29th Avenue		
41	Crown; West 41st Avenue at Crown Street	Joyce–Collingwood Station	Oakridge–41st Avenue; Joyce–Collingwood	[TROLLEY]	
42	Alma; Alma at Broadway	Spanish Banks		[NO EVENING] [NO WEEKDAY] [SUMMER-ONLY] [COMMUNITY SHUTTLE]	
44	UBC	Downtown; Waterfront station Dundarave; Marine at 25th Street	[DOWNTOWN] Waterfront; Burrard	[ARTICULATED] [EXPRESS] [NO EVENING] [WEEKDAY-ONLY] [PEAK-ROUTING] Select trips extend to/from Dundarave, September to April	
49	UBC	Metrotown Station	Langara–49th Avenue; Metrotown	[ARTICULATED]	
50	Waterfront Station; Keefer at Taylor	S. False Creek via Granville Isl. Olympic Village station	[DOWNTOWN] Olympic Village; Vancouver City Centre; Granville; Waterfront; Stadium–Chinatown	[SHARED ROUTE] Becomes Route 15 on terminus at Olympic Village station	
68	Wesbrook Village	UBC		[COMMUNITY SHUTTLE]	
80	River District	Marine Drive Station	Marine Drive	[PEAK-ONLY]	
84	UBC	VCC–Clark Station	Olympic Village; VCC–Clark	[ARTICULATED] [EXPRESS] Along 4th Avenue between Fir Street and UBC	
99	UBC	Commercial–Broadway Station	Commercial–Broadway; Broadway–City Hall	[B-LINE] [LIMITED] Trips starting or ending at Burnaby Transit Centre continue along Broadway and serve Boundary Loop	
100	Marpole; Marpole Loop	22nd Street Station	Marine Drive; 22nd Street	Hourly trips operate via Willard Street and Trapp Road in Burnaby; PM peak trips use West 71st Avenue instead of West 70th Avenue to Marpole Loop	

=== Burnaby / New Westminster ===
Route	Termini		Connections	Notes	Source
R5	Burrard Station	SFU	[DOWNTOWN] Waterfront; Burrard	[RAPIDBUS]	
101	22nd Street Station	Lougheed Station	22nd Street; Lougheed Town Centre		
102	New Westminster Station	Victoria Hill; Queens Park Care Centre	New Westminster; Columbia	[COMMUNITY SHUTTLE]	
103	New Westminster Station	Quayside; Quayside at Renaissance	New Westminster	[COMMUNITY SHUTTLE]	
104	Annacis Island; 1600 Block on Cliveden; Queensborough; Furness at Ewen	22nd Street Station	22nd Street	[AM PEAK-ONLY] Some AM peak hour trips short turn at Furness Street and Ewen Avenue	
105	New Westminster Station	Uptown; 8th Street at 7th Avenue	New Westminster; Columbia	[COMMUNITY SHUTTLE]	
106	Edmonds Station	New Westminster Station	Edmonds; New Westminster	Via 6th Street and Edmonds Street.	
109	New Westminster Station	Lougheed Station	New Westminster; Columbia; Lougheed Town Centre	[COMMUNITY SHUTTLE]	
110	Metrotown Station	Lougheed Station	Metrotown; Sperling–Burnaby Lake; Production Way–University; Lougheed Town Centre		
112	Edmonds Station	New Westminster Station	Edmonds; New Westminster	Via 12th Street	
116	Metrotown Station; Big Bend; Byrne Road at North Fraser Way	Edmonds Station	Metrotown; Edmonds	Via North Fraser Way Select peak hour trips terminate at Byrne Road & North Fraser Way	
119	Metrotown Station	Edmonds Station	Metrotown; Edmonds	Via Kingsway	
123	New Westminster Station	Brentwood Station; To Sixth Ave; 6th Street at 6th Avenue	New Westminster; Brentwood Town Centre	[PEAK ROUTING] Some PM peak hour trips short turn at 6th Street at 6th Avenue.	
128	Braid Station	22nd Street Station	Braid; 22nd Street	Via 8th Avenue	
129	Patterson Station	Holdom Station	Metrotown^{#} Patterson; Gilmore; Holdom	[LIMITED] Early morning service on weekends from Metrotown station. [SHARED ROUTE] Becomes Route 133 from terminus on Holdom station	
130	Metrotown Station	Kootenay Loop Phibbs Exchange	Metrotown; Brentwood Town Centre	[NO EVENING] Between Kootenay Loop and Phibbs Exchange	
131	Hastings at Gilmore; MacDonald at Albert	Kootenay Loop		[COMMUNITY SHUTTLE]	
132	Capitol Hill; Cambridge at Grosvenor	Hastings at Gilmore; MacDonald at Albert		[COMMUNITY SHUTTLE]	
133	Holdom Station	Edmonds Station	Holdom; Edmonds	[SHARED ROUTE] Route 129 from terminus on Holdom station	
134	Brentwood Station	Lake City Station	Brentwood Town Centre; Sperling–Burnaby Lake; Lake City Way	[CONVENTIONAL] [COMMUNITY SHUTTLE] on weekends and holidays (conventional buses on weekdays)	
136	Brentwood Station	Lougheed Station	Brentwood Town Centre; Holdom; Production Way–University; Lougheed Town Centre	[CONVENTIONAL] [COMMUNITY SHUTTLE] on weekends and holidays (conventional buses on weekdays)	
143	SFU	Burquitlam Station	Burquitlam	[ARTICULATED] [WEEKDAY-ONLY] [NO EVENING]	
144	Metrotown Station	SFU	Metrotown; Sperling–Burnaby Lake		
145	Production Station	SFU	Production Way–University	[ARTICULATED]	
146	Suncrest; Marine at Greenall	Metrotown Station	Metrotown	[COMMUNITY SHUTTLE]	
147	Metrotown Station	Edmonds Station	Metrotown; Edmonds	[COMMUNITY SHUTTLE]	
148	Edmonds Station	Royal Oak Station	Edmonds; Royal Oak	[COMMUNITY SHUTTLE]	
155	Braid Station	22nd Street Station	Braid; 22nd Street	Via Hospital and 6th Avenue	

=== Coquitlam / Port Moody / Port Coquitlam ===
Route	Termini		Connections	Notes	Source
R3	Coquitlam Central Station	Haney Place Exchange	Coquitlam Central	[RAPIDBUS]	
150	Coquitlam Central Station	White Pine Beach	Coquitlam Central	[SUMMER-ONLY] May (weekends and holidays); June–September (Monday–Sunday)	
151	Burquitlam Station	Coquitlam Central Station	Burquitlam; Coquitlam Central		
152	Lougheed Station	Coquitlam Central Station	Lougheed Town Centre; Coquitlam Central	[PEAK ROUTING] Alternate trips via Chilko [LIMITED] via Poirier Community Centre when school is open	
153	Coquitlam Central Station	Braid Station	Coquitlam Central; Braid	[COMMUNITY SHUTTLE] on weekends and holidays Via Poirier Community Centre	
156	Lougheed Station	Braid Station	Lougheed Town Centre; Burquitlam; Braid	Via Poirier Community Centre	
157	Lougheed Station	Burquitlam Station	Lougheed Town Centre; Burquitlam	[COMMUNITY SHUTTLE] on weekends and holidays Via Poirier Community Centre	
159	Coquitlam Central Station	Braid Station	Coquitlam Central; Port Coquitlam*; Braid	[PEAK ROUTING] via Port Coquitlam station	
160	Kootenay Loop	Port Coquitlam Station	Moody Centre; Inlet Centre; Lafarge Lake–Douglas; Lincoln; Coquitlam Central; Port Coquitlam		
169	Coquitlam Central Station	Braid Station	Coquitlam Central; Braid	[COMMUNITY SHUTTLE] Except weekends (conventional buses); Via Riverview Hospital	
170	Port Coquitlam Station	Port Coquitlam South; Western at Eastern	Port Coquitlam	[COMMUNITY SHUTTLE][LIMITED] One PM trip from Riverside Secondary School to Port Coquitlam South.[LIMITED] Two PM trips via Riverside Secondary School. Southbound service only.	
171	Coquitlam Central Station	Fremont; Dominion at Fremont	Coquitlam Central	[COMMUNITY SHUTTLE] [SHARED ROUTE] Becomes Route 172 from terminus on Dominion at Fremont	
172	Coquitlam Central Station	Riverside; Fremont at Dominion	Coquitlam Central	[COMMUNITY SHUTTLE] [SHARED ROUTE] Becomes Route 171 from terminus on Dominion at Fremont	
173	Coquitlam Central Station	Cedar; Victoria at Rocklin	Coquitlam Central; Port Coquitlam	[COMMUNITY SHUTTLE] [SHARED ROUTE] Becomes Route 174 from terminus on Victoria at Rocklin [LIMITED] Two PM trips to Victoria at Rocklin from Terry Fox Secondary.	
174	Coquitlam Central Station	Rocklin; Victoria at Rocklin	Coquitlam Central; Port Coquitlam	[COMMUNITY SHUTTLE] [SHARED ROUTE] Becomes Route 173 from terminus on Victoria at Rocklin	
175	Coquitlam Central Station	Meridian; Kebet at Mustang	Coquitlam Central; Port Coquitlam	[COMMUNITY SHUTTLE] [PEAK-ONLY]	
179	Coquitlam Central Station	Buntzen Lake	Coquitlam Central; Inlet Centre	[NO WEEKDAY] [SUMMER-ONLY] April – September	
180	Lougheed Station	Moody Centre Station	Lougheed Town Centre; Burquitlam; Moody Centre	[COMMUNITY SHUTTLE] Except weekday peak hours (conventional buses); Via Glenayre [LIMITED] One PM trip to Lougheed Station from Port Moody Secondary School, drop-off only for the entire trip.	
181	Moody Centre Station	Ioco; Ioco Road at 2nd Avenue Belcarra; Belcarra Bay at Whiskey Cove	Moody Centre	[COMMUNITY SHUTTLE] Late evening trips extend to Anmore and Belcarra	
182	Moody Centre Station	Belcarra; Belcarra Bay at Whiskey Cove	Moody Centre	[COMMUNITY SHUTTLE] All trips via Ravine; All morning inbound trips and afternoon outbound trips via Anmore	
183	Moody Centre Station	Coquitlam Central Station	Moody Centre; Inlet Centre; Lafarge Lake–Douglas; Lincoln; Coquitlam Central	[COMMUNITY SHUTTLE] on weekday late night, early morning trips and weekends and holidays	
184	Moody Centre Station	Noons Creek; Lansdowne at Panorama	Moody Centre; Inlet Centre	[COMMUNITY SHUTTLE] [SHARED ROUTE] Becomes Route 185 from terminus on Panorama Drive	
185	Coquitlam Central Station	Lansdowne; Panorama at Lansdowne	Coquitlam Central	[COMMUNITY SHUTTLE] [SHARED ROUTE] Becomes Route 184 from terminus on Panorama Drive	
186	Coquitlam Central Station	Hampton Park; Paddock Drive at 1700 Block	Coquitlam Central; Lincoln; Lafarge Lake–Douglas	[COMMUNITY SHUTTLE]	
187	Coquitlam Central Station	Parkway Boulevard; Parkway at Plateau	Coquitlam Central	[COMMUNITY SHUTTLE] Except weekday peak hours (conventional buses)	
188	Coquitlam Central Station	Port Coquitlam Station	Coquitlam Central; Lincoln; Lafarge Lake–Douglas; Port Coquitlam		
189	Coquitlam Central Station	Lafarge Park; Harwood at Gabriola	Coquitlam Central	[COMMUNITY SHUTTLE] Except weekday peak hours (conventional buses).	
191	Coquitlam Central Station	Princeton; Princeton at David	Coquitlam Central; Lafarge Lake–Douglas		

=== North Vancouver ===
214 (off-peak), 215 and 227 are operated by West Vancouver Blue Bus.

Route	Termini		Connections	Notes	Source
R2	Park Royal	Metrotown Station	Lonsdale Quay; Brentwood Town Centre; Metrotown	[RAPIDBUS]	
209	Burrard Station	Upper Lynn Valley; Underwood at Dempsey	[DOWNTOWN] Burrard	[EVENING-ONLY] Daytime as "210 Burrard Station / Upper Lynn Valley".	
210	Burrard Station	Upper Lynn Valley; Underwood at Dempsey	[DOWNTOWN] Burrard	[EXPRESS] In Vancouver. [NO EVENING] Evenings as "209 Burrard Station / Upper Lynn Valley".	
211	Burrard Station Phibbs Exchange	Seymour; Banbury at Gallant	[DOWNTOWN] Burrard	[EXPRESS] In Vancouver. [NO EVENING] Vancouver portion, served by "209 Burrard Station / Upper Lynn Valley". [LIMITED] 2 weekday morning eastbound trips via Old Dollarton.	
212	Phibbs Exchange	Deep Cove; Panorama at Naughton			
214	Burrard Station Phibbs Exchange	Blueridge; Sechelt at Hyannis	[DOWNTOWN] Burrard	[COMMUNITY SHUTTLE] Most trips. [AM PEAK-ONLY] [CONVENTIONAL] Service to Vancouver. [EXPRESS] In Vancouver. Some trips via Riverside.	
215	Phibbs Exchange	Indian River; Inlet Cres. at Indian River		[COMMUNITY SHUTTLE]	
227	Phibbs Exchange	Lynn Valley		[COMMUNITY SHUTTLE]	
228	Lonsdale Quay	Lynn Valley; Underwood at Dempsey	Lonsdale Quay	Via Lynn Valley Road	
229	Lonsdale Quay	Lynn Valley	Lonsdale Quay	Via Lonsdale Avenue	
230	Lonsdale Quay	Upper Lonsdale; Prospect at Rockland	Lonsdale Quay		
231	Lonsdale Quay	Harbourside; Harbourside Drive at Harbourside Place	Lonsdale Quay	[PEAK-ONLY] To Harbourside in morning and one PM trip; to Lonsdale Quay in afternoon.	
232	Grouse Mountain	Phibbs Exchange			
236	Lonsdale Quay	Grouse Mountain Pemberton Heights; 22nd Street at Philip Avenue	Lonsdale Quay	3 early morning weekend trips short turn at Philip Avenue from Lonsdale Quay.	
240	Downtown; Cambie at Georgia	Lynn Valley	[DOWNTOWN] Vancouver City Centre; Granville		
241	Downtown; Cambie at Georgia	Upper Lonsdale; Lonsdale at Osborne	[DOWNTOWN] Vancouver City Centre; Granville	[PEAK-ONLY] To Downtown in morning; to Upper Lonsdale in afternoon.	
245	Phibbs Exchange	Capilano University			
246	Downtown; Cambie at Georgia	Highland; Montroyal at Glencanyon	[DOWNTOWN] Vancouver City Centre; Granville	Select late evening trips from Montroyal at Glencanyon short-turn at Marine. [SHARED ROUTE] Eastbound service continues as "249 Lonsdale Quay" from Montroyal at Glencanyon.	
247	Downtown; Cambie at Georgia	Grouse Mountain	[DOWNTOWN] Vancouver City Centre; Granville	[PEAK-ONLY] To Downtown in morning; to Grouse Mountain in afternoon.	
249	Delbrook; Montroyal at Glencanyon	Lonsdale Quay	Lonsdale Quay	[SHARED ROUTE] Westbound service continues as "246 Downtown" from Montroyal at Glencanyon.	

=== West Vancouver ===
All routes are operated by West Vancouver Blue Bus (except route 257).

Route	Termini		Connections	Notes	Source
250	Vancouver; Homer at Georgia	Horseshoe Bay; Keith Road at Bay; Dundarave; Marine at 25th Street	[DOWNTOWN] Vancouver City Centre; Granville	Most trips as "250A Dundarave" [COMMUNITY SHUTTLE] Select eastbound late night trips and runs to Park Royal only	
251	Park Royal	Queens; Marine at 25th Street		[COMMUNITY SHUTTLE]	
252	Park Royal	Inglewood; Marine at 25th Street		[COMMUNITY SHUTTLE]	
253	Vancouver; Homer at Georgia Park Royal	Caulfeild; Caulfeild Drive at Headland Drive	[DOWNTOWN] Vancouver City Centre*; Granville*	[PEAK ROUTING] Service to Vancouver	
254	Vancouver; Homer at Georgia; Park Royal	British Properties; Glenmore and Bonnymuir	[DOWNTOWN] Vancouver City Centre*; Granville*	[PEAK ROUTING] Service to Vancouver	
255	Capilano University	Dundarave; Marine at 25th Street; Park Royal		[NO EVENING] Between Park Royal and Dundarave	
256	Spuraway	Whitby Estates; Chippendale at Westhill		[COMMUNITY SHUTTLE]	
257	Vancouver; Dunsmuir at Cambie	Horseshoe Bay; Keith Road at Bay	[DOWNTOWN] Stadium–Chinatown; Vancouver City Centre; Granville	[ARTICULATED] [EXPRESS]	
262	Brunswick; Brunswick Beach Road at Highway 99; Horseshoe Bay; Keith Road at Bay	Caulfeild; Safeway at Caulfeild Village Shopping Centre		[COMMUNITY SHUTTLE]	
Cemetery service	Dundarave Marine at 25th Street	Capilano View Cemetery		[COMMUNITY SHUTTLE] Runs on the second Sunday of each month only	

=== Bowen Island ===
These routes are operated by First Transit.

Route	Termini		Connection	Notes	Source
280	Snug Cove	Bluewater; Windjammer Road at Spyglass Road		[COMMUNITY SHUTTLE] [NO EVENING]	
281	Snug Cove	Eagle Cliff; Eaglecliff Road at Baker Road		[COMMUNITY SHUTTLE] [NO EVENING]	
282	Snug Cove	Mt Gardner; Endswell Farm		[COMMUNITY SHUTTLE] [WEEKEND-ONLY] [NO EVENING]	

=== Surrey / North Delta / White Rock ===
Route	Termini		Connections	Notes	Source
R1	Guildford Exchange	Newton Exchange	Surrey Central; King George	[RAPIDBUS]	
R6	Scott Road Station	Newton Exchange	Scott Road	[RAPIDBUS]	
301	Newton Exchange	Richmond–Brighouse Station	Richmond–Brighouse	[COACH] [EXPRESS]	
310	Scottsdale Exchange	Ladner; 51 Street at 47 Avenue		[CONVENTIONAL] Most trips [COMMUNITY SHUTTLE] for trips via Delta View Enrichment Centre	
311	Bridgeport Station	Scottsdale	Bridgeport	[COACH] [PEAK-ONLY] To Bridgeport in morning; to Scottsdale in afternoon. [EXPRESS] Between Massey Exchange (Steveston Highway at Highway 99) and Bridgeport station	
312	Scott Road Station	Scottsdale	Scott Road		
314	Surrey Central Station	Scott at 96 Avenue Sunbury; River at Centre	Surrey Central; King George	[NO EVENING] [NO SUNDAY] Sunbury portion	
316	Surrey Central Station	Scottsdale	Surrey Central		
319	Scott Road Station	Newton Exchange	Scott Road		
320	Surrey Central Station	Fleetwood; 88 Avenue at 156 Street Langley Centre	Surrey Central	Approximately one out of every two trips serve Langley Centre. Via Fleetwood & Cloverdale.	
321	Surrey Central Station; Scott Road Station	White Rock Centre; White Rock South; King George at 1100 Block	Surrey Central; King George; Scott Road^{*} New Westminster^{#}	Select early morning and late evening trips extend to White Rock South. [PEAK-ROUTING] Service to Scott Road [LIMITED] Early morning service north to New Westminster on Sundays/holidays	
322	Scottsdale	Newton Exchange		[COMMUNITY SHUTTLE]	
323	Surrey Central Station	Newton Exchange	Surrey Central	[ARTICULATED] Most trips [CONVENTIONAL] Select peak hour trips Via 128th Street	
324	Surrey Central Station	Newton Exchange	Surrey Central	Via 132nd Street	
325	Surrey Central Station	Newton Exchange	Surrey Central	Via 140th Street	
326	Surrey Central Station	Guildford	Surrey Central; King George	Via 88th Avenue	
329	Surrey Central Station	Scottsdale	Surrey Central; King George	[NO EVENING] [NO SUNDAY] First two morning trips to Scottsdale start on Scott Road at 92nd Avenue; Last afternoon trip from Scottsdale terminates on 96th Avenue at Scott Road	
335	Surrey Central Station	Newton Exchange	Surrey Central; Gateway	Via Guildford	
337	Fraser Heights; 168 Street at 104 Avenue	Guildford Surrey Central Station	Surrey Central	[EXPRESS] Between Surrey Central station and Guildford; Select midday weekday trips short turn at Guildford.	
338	Guildford	East Fraser Heights; 177A Street at 101A Avenue		[COMMUNITY SHUTTLE]	
340	Scottsdale	22nd Street Station	22nd Street	[COACH]	
341	Guildford	Newton Exchange			
342	Newton Exchange	Langley Centre			
345	King George Station	White Rock Centre	King George	[WEEKDAY-ONLY]	
350	White Rock Centre	Crescent Beach; Sulivan at Kidd			
351	Bridgeport Station	White Rock Centre	Bridgeport	[COACH] [EXPRESS]	
352	Bridgeport Station	Ocean Park; White Rock Centre	Bridgeport	[COACH] [EXPRESS] [PEAK-ONLY] To Bridgeport in morning; to Ocean Park in afternoon.	
354	Bridgeport Station	White Rock South; White Rock Centre	Bridgeport	[COACH] [EXPRESS] [PEAK-ONLY] To Bridgeport in morning; to White Rock South in afternoon. Via Morgan Creek.	
360	Ocean Park; 128 Street at 17 Avenue	Peace Arch Hospital; Finlay at Russell		[COMMUNITY SHUTTLE] [NO EVENING] Becomes Route 361 from terminus on 128 Street at 17 Avenue	
361	White Rock Centre	Ocean Park; 128 Street at 16 Avenue		[COMMUNITY SHUTTLE] [NO EVENING] Becomes Route 360 from terminus on 128 Street at 16 Avenue	
362	Seaside; Marine at Martin	White Rock Centre		[COMMUNITY SHUTTLE] Some late evening trips only operate on Fridays and Saturdays.	
363	Southpoint; 32 Avenue Diversion at King George Boulevard	Peace Arch Hospital; Finlay at Russell		[COMMUNITY SHUTTLE] Some late evening trips only operate on Fridays and Saturdays.	
364	Langley Centre	Scottsdale			
370	Cloverdale; 180 Street at 55 Avenue	Willowbrook; 198 Street at Willowbrook Drive		[COMMUNITY SHUTTLE] Operated by First Transit	
371	Surrey Central Station	Scott Road Station	Surrey Central; Gateway; Scott Road	[COMMUNITY SHUTTLE]	
372	Clayton Heights; 68 Avenue at 18700 Block	Langley Centre		[COMMUNITY SHUTTLE] Operated by First Transit	
373	Guildford	Surrey Central Station	Gateway; Surrey Central	[COMMUNITY SHUTTLE]	
375	Guildford	White Rock South; King George at 11 Avenue			
388	22nd Street Station	Carvolth Exchange	22nd Street	[WEEKDAY-ONLY]	
391	Scott Road Station	Scottsdale	Scott Road	[PEAK-ONLY] To Scott Road in morning; to Scottsdale in afternoon.	
393	Surrey Central Station	Newton Exchange	Surrey Central	[PEAK-ONLY] To Surrey Central in morning; to Newton Exchange in afternoon. Via South Newton	
394	King George Station	White Rock Centre	King George	[EXPRESS] [PEAK-ONLY]	
395	King George Station	Langley Centre	King George	[PEAK-ONLY] To King George in morning; to Langley Centre in afternoon.	

=== Richmond ===
Route	Termini		Connections	Notes	Source
401	Richmond–Brighouse Station	One Road; Steveston Exchange	Richmond–Brighouse		
402	Richmond–Brighouse Station	Two Road; Steveston Exchange	Richmond–Brighouse		
403	Bridgeport Station	Three Road; Riverport Entertainment Complex	Richmond–Brighouse; Lansdowne; Aberdeen; Capstan; Bridgeport		
404	Richmond–Brighouse Station	Four Road; Riverport Entertainment Complex	Richmond–Brighouse		
405	Five Road; Machrina at No.5 Road Richmond–Brighouse Station	Cambie; Marine at Knight	Richmond–Brighouse; Lansdowne	[PEAK ROUTING] via Vulcan	
406	Richmond–Brighouse Station	Steveston; Steveston Exchange	Richmond–Brighouse		
407	Gilbert; Steveston Exchange	Bridgeport; Marine at Knight; Lansdowne Station	Lansdowne; Capstan; Bridgeport	[PEAK ROUTING] via Vulcan	
408	Richmond–Brighouse Station	Ironwood; Horseshoe Way at No. 5 Road Riverport; Riverport Entertainment Complex	Richmond–Brighouse	[EVENING-ONLY] [WEEKEND-ONLY] Operates to/from Riverport Rec. Complex; Most evening trips do not operate to/from Horseshoe Way at Five Rd	
410	Richmond-Brighouse Station	22nd Street Station	Richmond–Brighouse; Lansdowne; Aberdeen; 22nd Street	[PEAK ROUTING] via Fraserwood	
412	Bridgeport Station	Sea Island South; Agar at Inglis	Bridgeport	[COMMUNITY SHUTTLE] [NO EVENING] [NO SUNDAY] Service during weekday peak hours operates with conventional buses Some trips operate via Cowley	
413	Steveston; Steveston Exchange	Riverport; Riverport Entertainment Complex		[COMMUNITY SHUTTLE] Evening trips operate only on Fridays and Saturdays	
414	Richmond–Brighouse Station	Richmond Oval; River Road at Hollybridge Way	Richmond–Brighouse	[COMMUNITY SHUTTLE] [NO SUNDAY]	
416	Richmond–Brighouse Station	East Cambie; Commerce Parkway at International Place	Richmond–Brighouse; Lansdowne	[COMMUNITY SHUTTLE] [PEAK-ONLY]	
418	22nd Street Station	Kingswood; Blundell Road at York Road	22nd Street	[PEAK-ONLY]	
430	Richmond–Brighouse Station	Metrotown Station	Richmond–Brighouse; Bridgeport; Metrotown	[EXPRESS]	

=== Langley ===
Route	Termini		Connections	Notes	Source
501	Surrey Central Station	Langley Centre	Surrey Central	[LIMITED] [PEAK-ONLY] Routes via 202A Street between 80th Avenue and 72nd Avenue when school is in session (one AM and one PM trip) [EXPRESS] Between Guildford Exchange and Surrey Central; Via Carvolth Exchange	
502	Surrey Central Station	Langley Centre	Surrey Central; King George	Via Fraser Highway	
503	Surrey Central Station	Aldergrove; 272 Street at Fraser Highway; Langley Centre	Surrey Central; King George	[EXPRESS] Between Langley Centre and Surrey Central; Via Fraser Highway	
509	Surrey Central Station	Walnut Grove; 88 Avenue at 212 Street	Surrey Central	[EXPRESS] [PEAK-ONLY] To Surrey Central in morning; to Walnut Grove in afternoon. [PM PEAK-ONLY] First eastbound trip terminates at Carvolth Exchange.	
531	White Rock Centre	Willowbrook; 198 Street at 64 Avenue		[LIMITED] [AM PEAK-ONLY] Two trips from Brookswood (40th Ave at 208th St) to Langley Centre only	
555	Lougheed Station	Carvolth Exchange	Lougheed Town Centre	[COACH] [EXPRESS]	
556	Langley Centre	Gloucester		[COMMUNITY SHUTTLE] Operated by Keolis	
560	Langley Centre	Murrayville; 208 Street at 48 Avenue		[COMMUNITY SHUTTLE] Operated by Keolis [SHARED ROUTE] Becomes Route 561 from terminus on 208 Street	
561	Langley Centre	Brookswood; 208 Street at 48 Avenue		[COMMUNITY SHUTTLE] Operated by Keolis [SHARED ROUTE] Becomes Route 560 from terminus on 208 Street	
562	Langley Centre	Walnut Grove; Carvolth Exchange		[COMMUNITY SHUTTLE] Operates some late evening trips on Sundays if the following Monday is a holiday Monday to Saturday daytime trips via TWU; Operated by Keolis	
563	Langley Centre	Fernridge; 198 Street at 24 Avenue		[COMMUNITY SHUTTLE] Operates some late evening trips on Sundays if the following Monday is a holiday Operated by Keolis	
564	Langley Centre	Willowbrook; Willowbrook Drive at 197 Street		[COMMUNITY SHUTTLE] Operated by Keolis	
595	Langley Centre	Maple Meadows Station	Maple Meadows	[PEAK ROUTING] Extends to Dewdney Trunk Road at 203rd Street	

=== Ladner / South Delta / Tsawwassen ===
Route	Termini		Connections	Notes	Source
601	Bridgeport Station	South Delta; 2nd Avenue at 52A Street Boundary Bay; 1A Avenue at 67th Street	Bridgeport	[COACH] [EXPRESS] Between Bridgeport station and Ladner Trunk Road at Highway 17A [LIMITED] [PEAK ROUTING] Some trips to/from Boundary Bay [PM PEAK-ONLY] Some trips continue as "606 Ladner Ring" [LIMITED] [EXPRESS] [WEEKDAY-ONLY] Last northbound weekday trip runs to Hwy 99 at Steveston Hwy (bypasses the Ladner area) First southbound weekday trip starts at Hwy 99 at Steveston Hwy (bypasses the Ladner area)	
602	Bridgeport Station	Tsawwassen Heights; 2nd Avenue at 52A Street	Bridgeport	[COACH] [PEAK-ONLY] To Bridgeport in morning; to Tsawwassen Heights in afternoon. [EXPRESS] Between Bridgeport station and South Delta Exchange	
603	Bridgeport Station	Beach Grove; 1st Avenue at 49th Street South Delta Exchange	Bridgeport	[COACH] [PEAK-ONLY] To Bridgeport in morning; to Beach Grove in afternoon. [EXPRESS] Between Bridgeport station and South Delta Exchange; Reverse loop service of 604; Some trips start/terminate at South Delta Exchange	
604	Bridgeport Station	English Bluff; 1st Avenue at English Bluff Road South Delta Exchange	Bridgeport	[COACH] [PEAK-ONLY] To Bridgeport in morning; to English Bluff in afternoon. [EXPRESS] Between Bridgeport station and South Delta Exchange; Reverse loop service of 603; Some trips start/terminate at South Delta Exchange	
606	Ladner Ring			[COACH] [PM PEAK-ONLY] Starts and terminates at Ladner Exchange; Clockwise loop service of 608	
608	Ladner Ring			[COACH] [AM PEAK-ONLY] Starts and terminates at Ladner Exchange; Counterclockwise loop service of 606	
609	South Delta Exchange	Ladner Exchange		[COMMUNITY SHUTTLE] via Tsawwassen First Nation	
614	South Delta Exchange	English Bluff; 1st Avenue at English Bluff Road		[COMMUNITY SHUTTLE]	
616	Ladner Exchange	Ladner South; River Road at 46A Street		[COMMUNITY SHUTTLE] [NO EVENING]	
618	Ladner Exchange	Ladner North; Ferry at Commodore		[COMMUNITY SHUTTLE] [NO EVENING]	
619	South Delta Exchange	Boundary Bay; 1A Avenue at 67th Street		[COMMUNITY SHUTTLE]	
620	Bridgeport Station	Tsawwassen Ferry	Bridgeport	[COACH] [EXPRESS] via Ladner Exchange; Extra trips on Fridays and Sundays	
640	Scott Road Station	Ladner Exchange	Scott Road	[WEEKDAY-ONLY] Via Vantage Way and Tilbury Industrial area. [PEAK-ONLY] Some peak hour trips short turn at River Road at 72 Avenue.	

=== Pitt Meadows / Maple Ridge ===
Route	Termini		Connections	Notes	Source
701	Coquitlam Central Station	Haney Place Exchange; Maple Ridge East; Dewdney Trunk at 248th Street	Coquitlam Central; Pitt Meadows; Maple Meadows	Approximately one of every two trips ends at Dewdney Trunk Road at 248th Street. [AM PEAK-ONLY] One AM trip towards Maple Ridge East to Samuel Robertson Secondary School via 240 St.	
701	Coquitlam Central Station	Mission City Station	Coquitlam Central; Pitt Meadows; Maple Meadows; Mission City	[LIMITED] [EXPRESS] [WEEKDAY-ONLY] Select trips to Mission City station; no stops between Haney Place Exchange and Mission City station.	
719	Fraser Way; Fraser Way at Barnston View Road	Meadowtown	Maple Meadows	[COMMUNITY SHUTTLE] [NO EVENING] [SHARED ROUTE] Becomes Route 722 from terminus on Fraser Way	
722	Bonson; Fraser Way at Barnston View Road	Meadowtown	Pitt Meadows	[COMMUNITY SHUTTLE] [NO EVENING] [SHARED ROUTE] Becomes Route 719 from terminus on Fraser Way	
733	Rock Ridge; 133 Avenue at Rock Ridge Drive	Haney Place Exchange Port Haney Station	Port Haney*	[COMMUNITY SHUTTLE] [PEAK-ONLY] Select trips to Port Haney station.	
741	Anderson Creek; 232 Street and Anderson Creek Drive	Haney Place Exchange; Port Haney Station	Port Haney*	[COMMUNITY SHUTTLE] [PEAK-ONLY] Select trips to Port Haney station.	
743	Haney Place Exchange	Meadowtown	Maple Meadows; Port Haney	[COMMUNITY SHUTTLE]	
744	Haney Place Exchange	Meadowtown	Maple Meadows	[COMMUNITY SHUTTLE]	
745	Haney Place Exchange	Cottonwood; 103rd Avenue at Jackson Road		[COMMUNITY SHUTTLE] [NO EVENING] [SHARED ROUTE] Becomes Route 746 from terminus on 103rd Avenue	
746	Haney Place Exchange; Port Haney Station	Albion; 103rd Avenue at Jackson Road	Port Haney*	[COMMUNITY SHUTTLE] [NO EVENING] [PEAK-ONLY] To Port Haney station. [PEAK-ONLY] One trip operates via Cottonwood. [SHARED ROUTE] Becomes Route 745 from terminus on 103rd Avenue	
748	Haney Place Exchange	Thornhill; 100th Avenue at 268th Street	Port Haney*	[COMMUNITY SHUTTLE] [NO EVENING] [NO SUNDAY] [PEAK-ONLY] To Port Haney station.	
749	Haney Place Exchange	Ruskin; 280th Street at Lougheed		[COMMUNITY SHUTTLE] [NO EVENING] [NO SUNDAY]	
791	Braid Station	Haney Place Exchange	Braid; Pitt Meadows; Maple Meadows	[NO EVENING] [WEEKDAY-ONLY] [EXPRESS] In Coquitlam and Port Coquitlam	

== School specials ==
These routes are special trips operating to and from high schools, usually before and after school hours, between September and June. Buses on these routes usually show "Special" or "School Special" on their signs. All other school specials use the route number of the closest regular route.

Route	Termini		Connections	Notes	Source
840	Langley Centre	Brookswood Secondary School; 40th Street at 208 Street		Created after 502 service to Brookswood discontinued in September 2016.; [LIMITED] AM southbound service only.	
855	King George at Crescent	Elgin Park Secondary School; 24th Avenue at 136th Street		Created after conversion of route 355 to community shuttle in September 2002	
864	Lord Tweedsmuir School; 60th Avenue at 180 Street	Newton Exchange		Created in conjunction with adjustments to bus service in Downtown Cloverdale in September 2016; [LIMITED] PM northbound service only.	
865	Samuel Robertson School; 104th Avenue at 245 Street	Haney Place Exchange		Version of route 746 that turns into a westbound 701 upon arrival at Haney Place Exchange; [LIMITED] PM westbound service only.	
880	Capilano University	Windsor Secondary School; Emerson Way at Mt. Seymour Pkwy.		Version of route 214.	
881	Philip at West 22nd	Carson Graham Secondary School; East 15 Street at Grand Boulevard		Mix of routes 236 and 240 via Larson Road and Jones Avenue	

== Bike Bus ==
Bike Bus is a seasonal trial bike service begun in June 2022 supplementing the 620 route running from Bridgeport station to the Tsawwassen ferry terminal. This service runs only on Fridays, weekends and holidays and is timed to connect with ferry arrivals and departures.

Route	Termini		Connections	Notes	Source
900	Bridgeport Station	Tsawwassen Ferry	Bridgeport	[SUMMER-ONLY] [NO WEEKDAY] (except Fridays) [EXPRESS]	

== NightBus ==
NightBus service is a late night bus service provided by TransLink. The buses run every 20 or 30 minutes from 1:30–5:15 a.m., seven nights a week. They all leave from Downtown Vancouver and serve most parts of the city plus many suburbs—including Burnaby, New Westminster, Port Moody, Coquitlam, Richmond, Surrey, North Vancouver—as well as provide late-night service along SkyTrain routes when train service is not operating.

Route	Termini		Notes	Source
N8	Downtown via Fraser	Marine Drive Station		
N9	Downtown	Coquitlam Central Station	Four additional eastbound trips start at Lougheed station; Extra early morning trips on Saturday and Sunday	
N10	Downtown	Richmond–Brighouse Station	Some trips via Vancouver International Airport.	
N15	Downtown via Cambie	Marine Drive Station		
N17	Downtown	UBC		
N19	Downtown	Surrey Central Station; New Westminster Station	Select eastbound trips terminate at New Westminster station.; Extra early morning eastbound trips on Saturday and Sunday.	
N20	Downtown via Victoria	Marine Drive Station		
N22	Downtown via Macdonald	Dunbar Loop		
N24	Downtown	Lynn Valley	Via Lonsdale Quay.; Extra late trip on Sunday if the following Monday is a stat holiday.	
N35	Downtown	SFU		

== Routes not operated by TransLink ==
Route	Route name	Notes	Source
21	Aldergrove Connector	Operated by Central Fraser Valley Transit System; Operates between Aldergrove and Abbotsford; No service in evenings; Timed to connect with 503 in Aldergrove; Separate fare required	
66	Fraser Valley Express (FVX)	Operated by Chilliwack Transit System; Operates between Burnaby, Langley, Abbotsford and Chilliwack; Separate fare required	

== Future routes ==
These routes have been identified in TransLink's 2008 Transportation Plan, Area Transit Plan, Southwest Area Transportation Plan and various open houses for bus service improvements, including the Evergreen Extension. Note that these routes are still in planning stage and they may or may not be implemented, with the exception of the routes that have been confirmed in the first list. When they are implemented, they may or may not use the same number as originally planned or stated in the following list.

Route	Termini		Implementation date	Replacing	Notes
Conventional bus routes
	Coquitlam Central station	Guildford Exchange		New route	Identified in Northeast Sector Area Transit Plan; Presented at Evergreen Extension open house
407E	Knight Street at Marine Drive	Bridgeport station		New route	Identified in Southwest Area Transport Plan; Split of route 407 at Bridgeport station
407W	Bridgeport station	Steveston Village		New route	Identified in Southwest Area Transport Plan; Split of route 407 at Bridgeport station
	Scott Road station	Tsawwassen Ferry Terminal		New route	Via the South Fraser Perimeter Road; Identified in Southwest Area Transport Plan; 640 to continue to provide local service to Tilbury Industrial Park
	Bridgeport station	Boundary Bay (1A Avenue at 67th Street)		601	Identified in Southwest Area Transportation Draft Plan; Replacing Boundary Bay portion of 601
RapidBus
	Metrotown station	Capilano University Exchange		New route	Originally known as "Willingdon B-Line"; Details in phase 2 or 3 of 10-Year Vision
	Lynn Valley Centre	Downtown Vancouver		New route	Details in phase 2 or 3 of 10-Year Vision; Route 240 will continue to provide local service
	Southeast Marine Drive	Downtown Vancouver		New route	Via Commercial Drive and Victoria Drive; Details in phase 2 or 3 of 10-Year Vision; Route 20 will continue to provide local service
	Coquitlam Central station	Langley Centre		New route	Details in phase 2 or 3 of 10-Year Vision
Bus rapid transit
	Surrey Central station	Semiahmoo Town Centre		New route	Called "King George Boulevard BRT"; Via King George Boulevard; Details in the 2025 Investment Plan; Details in the Bus Rapid Transit Program
	Willowbrook	Haney Place		New route	Called "Langley–Haney Place BRT"; Via 200th Street and Lougheed Highway; Details in the 2025 Investment Plan; Details in the Bus Rapid Transit Program
	Metrotown	Park Royal		New route	Called "Metrotown–North Shore BRT"; Via Willingdon Avenue, Highway 1, and Marine Drive; Details in the 2025 Investment Plan; Details in the Bus Rapid Transit Program
Community shuttle bus routes
368	Scottsdale Exchange	East Newton South		New route	Identified in the South of Fraser Area Transit Plan; Number assigned in the 2019 Transit Network Review; Updated to serve Newton Exchange after consultation results
	West Whalley			New route	Identified in South of Fraser Area Transit Plan
	Ladner Exchange	Langley Centre		New route	Identified in Southwest Area Transport Plan
	Richmond–Brighouse station	Blundell Road at Seafair Drive		New route	Identified in Southwest Area Transport Plan; New service along Blundell Road
