= Scottsdale Exchange =

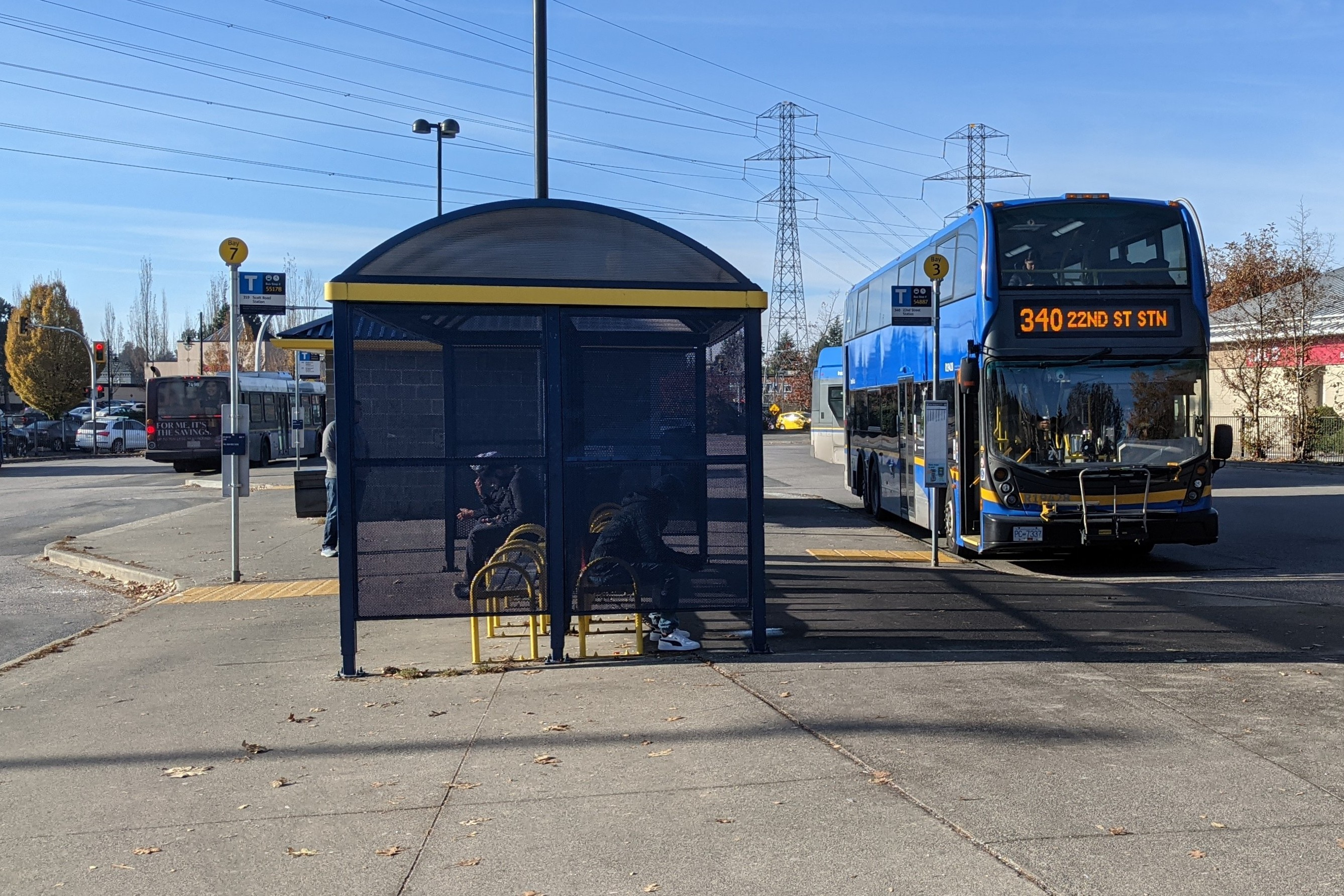
- 340 22nd Street Station on layover at Bay 3

General information
- Location: 7414 120 Street; Surrey, British Columbia; Canada
- Coordinates: 49°08′15″N 122°53′17″W
- Owner: TransLink
- Bus routes: 11
- Bus stands: 9
- Bus operators: Coast Mountain Bus Company

Other information
- Fare zone: 3

History
- Opened: May 30, 1975; 51 years ago
- Rebuilt: 1998; 28 years ago
Location

Scottsdale Exchange is a transit exchange located in the Strawberry Hill neighbourhood of Newton in Surrey, British Columbia, Canada. As part of the TransLink system, it serves the western Newton and North Delta areas with routes to Richmond, Ladner, New Westminster, Surrey City Centre, and Langley City that provide connections to several SkyTrain stations for travel towards Vancouver.

== Structure and location ==
The original Scottsdale Exchanged opened on May 30, 1975, and was located on-street just outside Scottsdale Mall on 70 Avenue and Nicholson Road, just west of Scott Road on the Delta side of the Surrey–Delta boundary. On December 14, 1998, the exchange was relocated to its current site near the 7400 block of 120 Street (Scott Road) in Surrey.

Scottsdale Exchange serves the nearby shopping centres of Scottsdale and Strawberry Hill, which includes a Cineplex movie theatre. It also functions as an important connector for commuters living in the surrounding residential areas, as well as the broader South of Fraser region. There are several open-sided shelters with benches on-site. It has the ability to host regular length diesel buses, community shuttles, articulated and double-decker buses.

== Routes ==
As of September 2021, the following routes serve Scottsdale Exchange:

| Bay | Route | Destination | Notes |
|---|---|---|---|
| 1 | 310 | Ladner | |
| 1 | 322 | Newton Exchange | |
| 2 | 316 | Surrey Central Station | |
| 2 | 329 | Surrey Central Station | |
| 3 | 340 | 22nd Street Station | |
| 4 | 319 | Newton Exchange | |
| 5 | 301 | Newton Exchange | |
| 6 | 312 | Scott Road Station | |
| 7 | 319 | Scott Road Station | |
| 8 | 301 | Brighouse Station | |
| 8 | 311 | Bridgeport Station | Express; AM peak hours only |
| 9 | 364 | Langley Centre | |
| 9 | 391 | Scott Road Station | AM peak hours only |

== See also ==
- List of bus routes in Metro Vancouver
