= Phibbs Exchange =

Transit exchange in North Vancouver, Canada

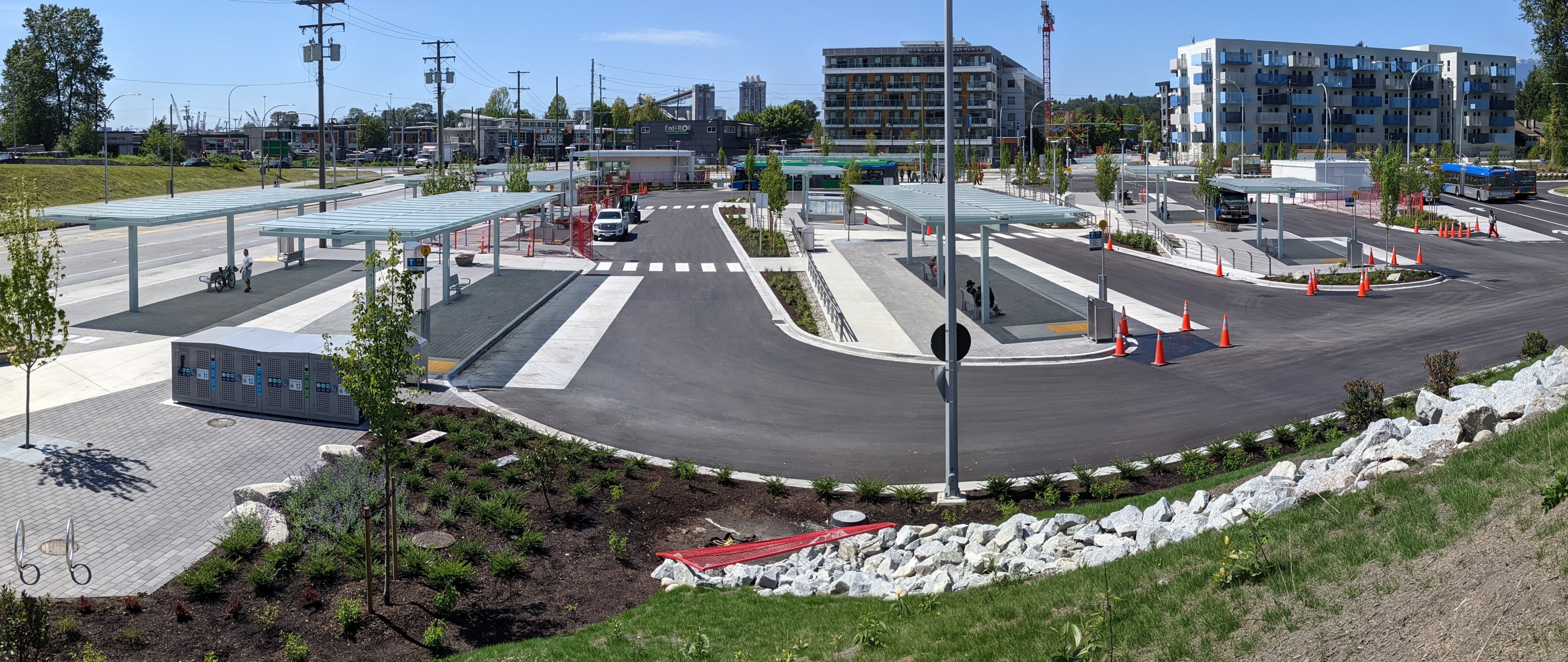
- The exchange in 2024

General information
- Location: Main St at Highway 1 North Vancouver, British Columbia; Canada
- Coordinates: 49°18′20″N 123°1′43″W
- Operator: TransLink
- Bus routes: 13
- Bus stands: 13
- Bus operators: Coast Mountain Bus Company
- Connections: R2 Marine–Willingdon

Other information
- Fare zone: 2

History
- Opened: October 19, 1973; 52 years ago
- Rebuilt: 2022–2024; 2 years ago
Location

Phibbs Exchange is a major transit exchange in the District of North Vancouver, British Columbia. Part of the TransLink system, it is home to routes serving the North Shore and provides connections to the cities of Vancouver and Burnaby. Opened on October 19, 1973, it is one of the four major transit exchanges on the North Shore (the others being Capilano University Exchange, Lonsdale Quay and Park Royal Exchange). The exchange is named after Charles J. P. Phibbs.

== Structure and location ==
Phibbs Exchange is located directly next to the northern foot of the Ironworkers Memorial Bridge, which connects North Vancouver to East Vancouver and Burnaby. It can accommodate regular-length and articulated diesel buses and community shuttle buses only.

The exchange is also located a short distance from Capilano University and North Shore Studios. The Pacific National Exhibition grounds is also nearby, just across the bridge in Vancouver. The exchange is located next to a park and ride facility.

Security at Phibbs Exchange is the responsibility of the Transit Security Department. Transit security officers can be found making random patrols of the exchange and conducting fare inspections on board buses. North Vancouver RCMP also make random patrols of the exchange. Bus drivers also have the ability to call for transit security agents in the event of an incident.

== Upgrades ==
Construction for a major upgrade of the exchange began in November 2022, with all buses relocating to street-side stops on July 24, 2023, to accommodate construction. The rebuilt exchange was completed in early May 2024.

== Routes ==
As of September 2026, the following routes serve Phibbs Exchange:

Bay	Location	Routes	Notes
1	Main Street; Westbound	—	Unloading only
2	Main Street; Westbound	—	HandyDART
3	Main Street; Westbound	214 Blueridge; Sechelt at Hyannis	Most trips operate with Community Shuttles
4	Orwell Street; Northbound	209 Upper Lynn Valley; Underwood at Dempsey	No daytime service
4	Orwell Street; Northbound	210 Upper Lynn Valley; Underwood at Dempsey	No evening service
5	Orwell Street; Northbound	R2 Marine–Willingdon to Metrotown station	RapidBus service
6	Bus loop	R2 Marine–Willingdon to Park Royal	RapidBus service
7	Bus loop	209 Burrard Station	No daytime service
7	Bus loop	210 Burrard Station	No evening service; Express in Vancouver
7	Bus loop	211 Burrard Station	Midday and weekday peak hour service to Vancouver; Express in Vancouver
7	Bus loop	214 Burrard Station	Peak hour service to Vancouver; Express in Vancouver; Most trips operate with Community Shuttles
8	Bus loop	245 Capilano University	
9	Bus loop	28 Joyce Station	
10	Bus loop	130 Metrotown Station	No late evening service to/from Phibbs Exchange
11	Bus loop	232 Grouse Mountain	One early morning trip on Saturdays operates as 232 Edgemont Village
12	Bus loop	211 Seymour Banbury at Gallant; 212 Deep Cove Panorama at Naughton	
13	Bus loop	215 Indian River; Inlet at Indian River	
13	Bus loop	227 Lynn Valley Centre	No evening service

== See also ==
- Kootenay Loop (the transit exchange just across the bridge)
- List of bus routes in Metro Vancouver
