= Haney Place Exchange =

Transit exchange in British Columbia, Canada

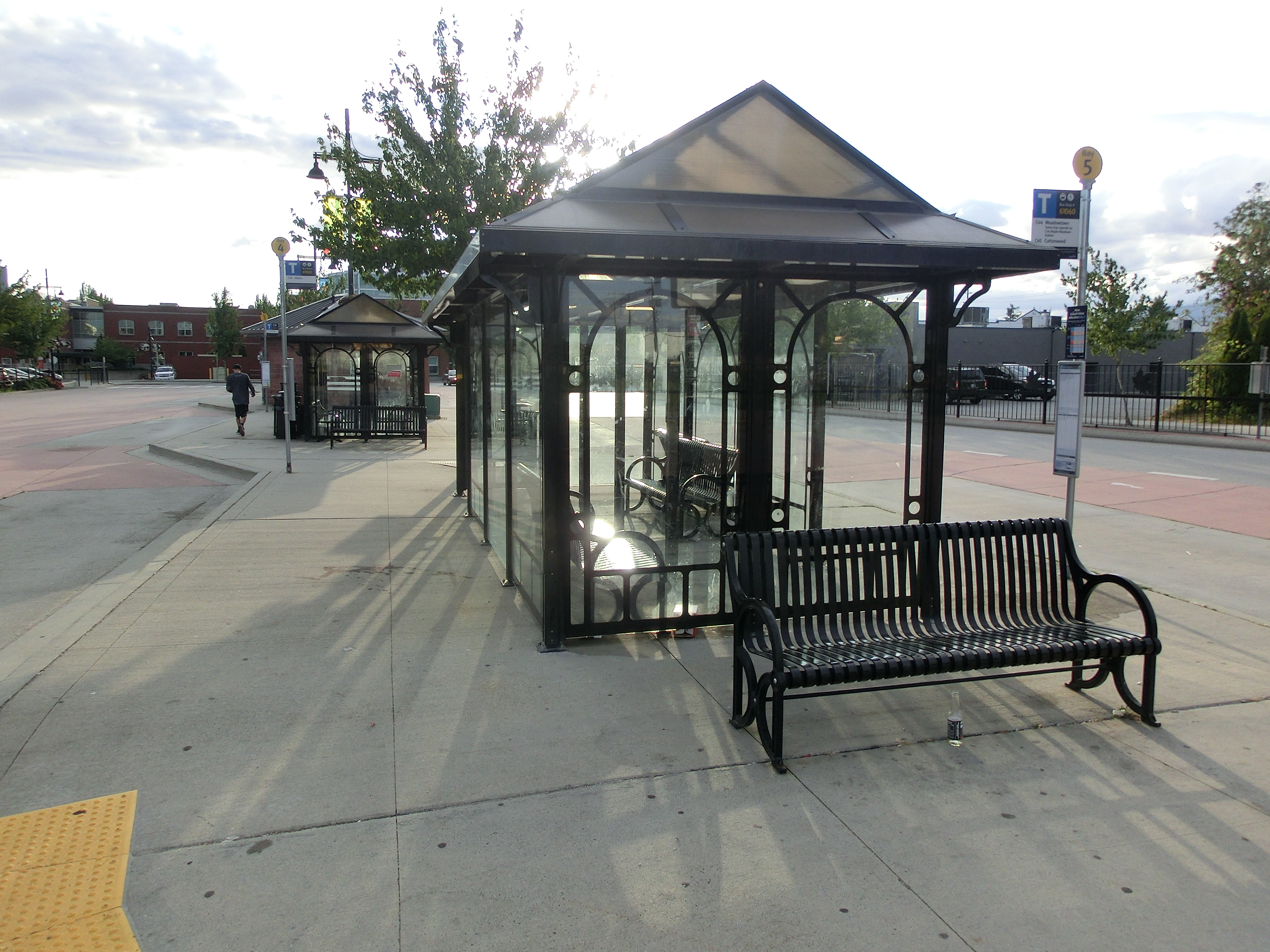

General information
- Location: Maple Ridge, British Columbia; Canada
- Coordinates: 49.2195°N 122.59709°W
- Operator: TransLink
- Bus routes: 11
- Bus stands: 9
- Bus operators: Coast Mountain Bus Company
- Connections: R3 Lougheed Hwy

Other information
- Fare zone: 3

History
- Opened: August 27, 2008
Location

Haney Place Exchange is a transit exchange in Maple Ridge, British Columbia, Canada. Opened on August 27, 2008, it is the easternmost major transit exchange in the Metro Vancouver area. Part of the TransLink system, it is home to routes serving Maple Ridge and Pitt Meadows, and routes to Coquitlam, the Township of Langley, and Braid station in New Westminster.

== Structure and location ==
The exchange is located in downtown Maple Ridge on the south side of McIntosh Avenue between Edge Street in the west and 226th Street in the East. It is next to Haney Place Mall, the Maple Ridge Royal Canadian Mounted Police, municipal hall, The ACT Arts Centre & Theatre, the Maple Ridge Leisure Centre, and numerous businesses.

=== Transit connections ===
Standard-sized diesel buses, longer articulated buses, and smaller community shuttle buses all use the Haney Place Exchange.

Bay assignments are as follows:

Bay	Route	Notes
1	733 Rock Ridge (Note: To Port Haney Station during PM peak hours)	
1	741 Anderson Creek	
2	701 Coquitlam Central Station	
3	791 Braid Station (Note: Express in Coquitlam and Port Coquitlam) (Note: Weekdays only) (Note: No evening service)	
4	746 Albion	
4	749 Ruskin (Note: No service on Sundays and holidays)	
5	744 Meadowtown (Note: To Maple Meadows Station during peak hours)	
5	745 Cottonwood	
6	701 Maple Ridge East; 701 Mission City Station (Note: Limited weekday service only)	
7		Unloading only
8	R3 Lougheed Hwy	To Coquitlam Central Station (RapidBus)
9	743 Meadowtown (Note: To South Haney on Sundays and holidays only)	
9	748 Thornhill	

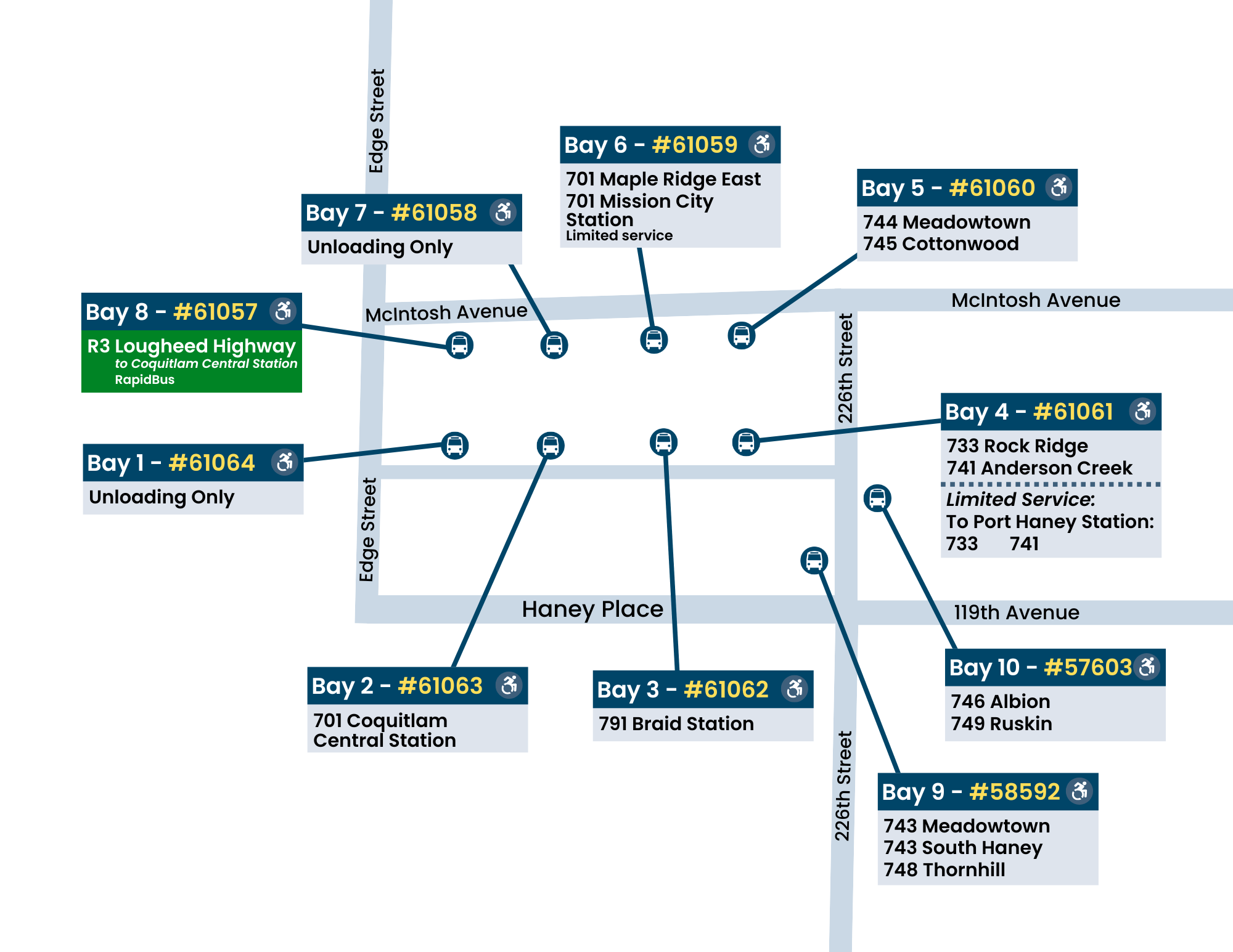
Haney Place Exchange bus connection map

== See also ==
- List of bus routes in Metro Vancouver
