= Capilano University Exchange =

Bus terminus in British Columbia, Canada

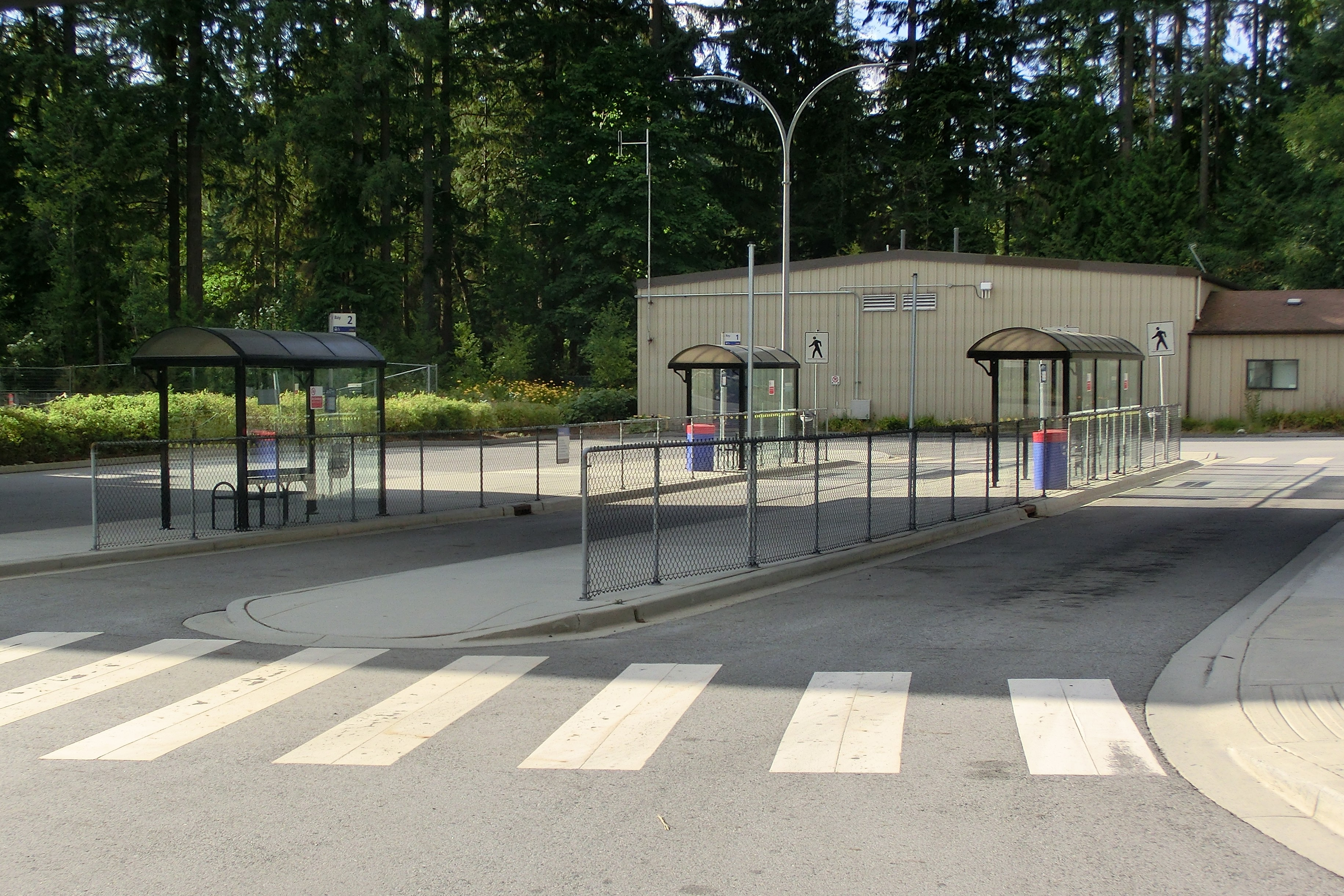

General information
- Location: Capilano University; North Vancouver, British Columbia; Canada
- Coordinates: 49°19′9″N 123°1′8″W
- Operator: TransLink
- Bus routes: 2
- Bus stands: 5
- Bus operators: Coast Mountain Bus Company; West Vancouver Blue Bus

Other information
- Fare zone: 2

History
- Opened: February 9, 2009
Location

Capilano University Exchange is a bus terminus for TransLink located on the campus of Capilano University in the District of North Vancouver, British Columbia, Canada. Opened on February 9, 2009, the exchange's only connections are to West Vancouver (via the City of North Vancouver) and the nearby Phibbs Exchange, which are served by only 2 routes (routes 245 and 255). Route 245 is operated by Coast Mountain Bus Company, while route 255 is operated by West Vancouver Blue Bus.

== Routes ==
| Route# | Bay # | Destination | Notes |
|---|---|---|---|
| – | 1 | Unloading only | |
| 245 | 2 | Phibbs Exchange | |
| 255 | 3 | Dundarave via Lower Lonsdale | |

== See also ==
- List of bus routes in Metro Vancouver
