= Langley Centre =

Public transit exchange in Langley, British Columbia, Canada

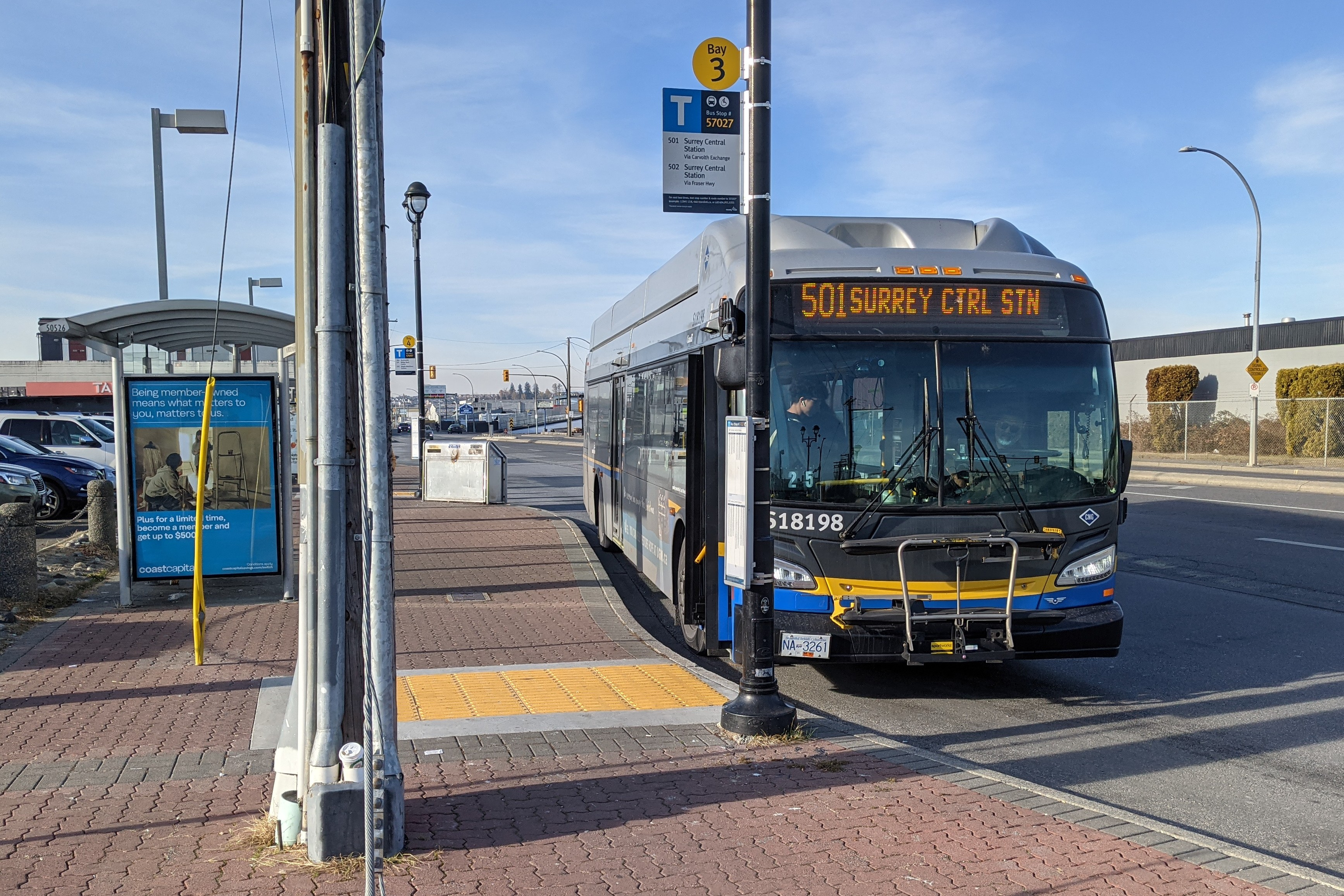
- Bus bays located on Logan Avenue

General information
- Location: Glover Road & Logan Avenue; Langley, British Columbia; Canada
- Coordinates: 49°06′23″N 122°39′16″W
- Operator: TransLink
- Bus routes: 15
- Bus stands: 7
- Bus operators: Coast Mountain Bus Company

Other information
- Fare zone: 3

History
- Opened: October 31, 1975; 50 years ago
- Former names: Langley Bus Terminal
Location

Langley Centre is an on-street bus exchange located in downtown Langley City, British Columbia, Canada. As part of the TransLink system, it serves the municipalities of Langley City and Langley Township with routes to Surrey, Maple Ridge, and White Rock, that provide connections to SkyTrain and the West Coast Express rail services for travel towards Vancouver.

== Structure and location ==
The exchange opened on October 31, 1975, and is located on the curb lanes at the intersection of Glover Road and Logan Avenue in Langley City. It is not separated from regular traffic and can accommodate regular-length diesel buses and smaller community shuttles. Beside the exchange is the Rainbow Mall, a small shopping complex.

It is less than a kilometre from the main commercial centre of Langley City on Fraser Highway, and a few kilometres from Langley's largest shopping mall, Willowbrook Shopping Centre.

In 2022, an Expo Line extension from King George station to 203 Street in Langley City was approved with an estimated completion date of 2029. When completed, the new Langley City Centre SkyTrain station at 203 Street and Fraser Highway will replace Langley Centre bus exchange.

== Routes ==
As of September 2019, the following routes serve Langley Centre exchange:

Bay	Location	Routes	Notes
1	Glover Road; Southbound	503 Surrey Central Station	Limited stop express via Fraser Highway
2	Logan Avenue; Eastbound	320 Surrey Central Station	Via Downtown Cloverdale and Guildford Town Centre
2	Logan Avenue; Eastbound	342 Newton Exchange	
3	Logan Avenue; Eastbound	501 Surrey Central Station	Via Port Kells
3	Logan Avenue; Eastbound	502 Surrey Central Station	Via Fraser Highway
4	Logan Avenue; Eastbound	364 Scottsdale	
4	Logan Avenue; Eastbound	531 White Rock Centre	
4	Logan Avenue; Eastbound	595 Maple Meadows Station	
5	Logan Avenue; Eastbound	395 King George Station	Morning peak hours only
5	Logan Avenue; Eastbound	503 Aldergrove	
6	Logan Avenue; Eastbound	372 Clayton Heights	
6	Logan Avenue; Eastbound	560 Murrayville	
6	Logan Avenue; Eastbound	561 Brookswood	
6	Logan Avenue; Eastbound	562 Walnut Grove	Carvolth Exchange
6	Logan Avenue; Eastbound	563 Fernridge	
6	Logan Avenue; Eastbound	564 Willowbrook	
7	Logan Avenue; Westbound	531 Willowbrook	

== See also ==
- List of bus routes in Metro Vancouver
