= R3 Lougheed Hwy =

Express bus service in Metro Vancouver, Canada

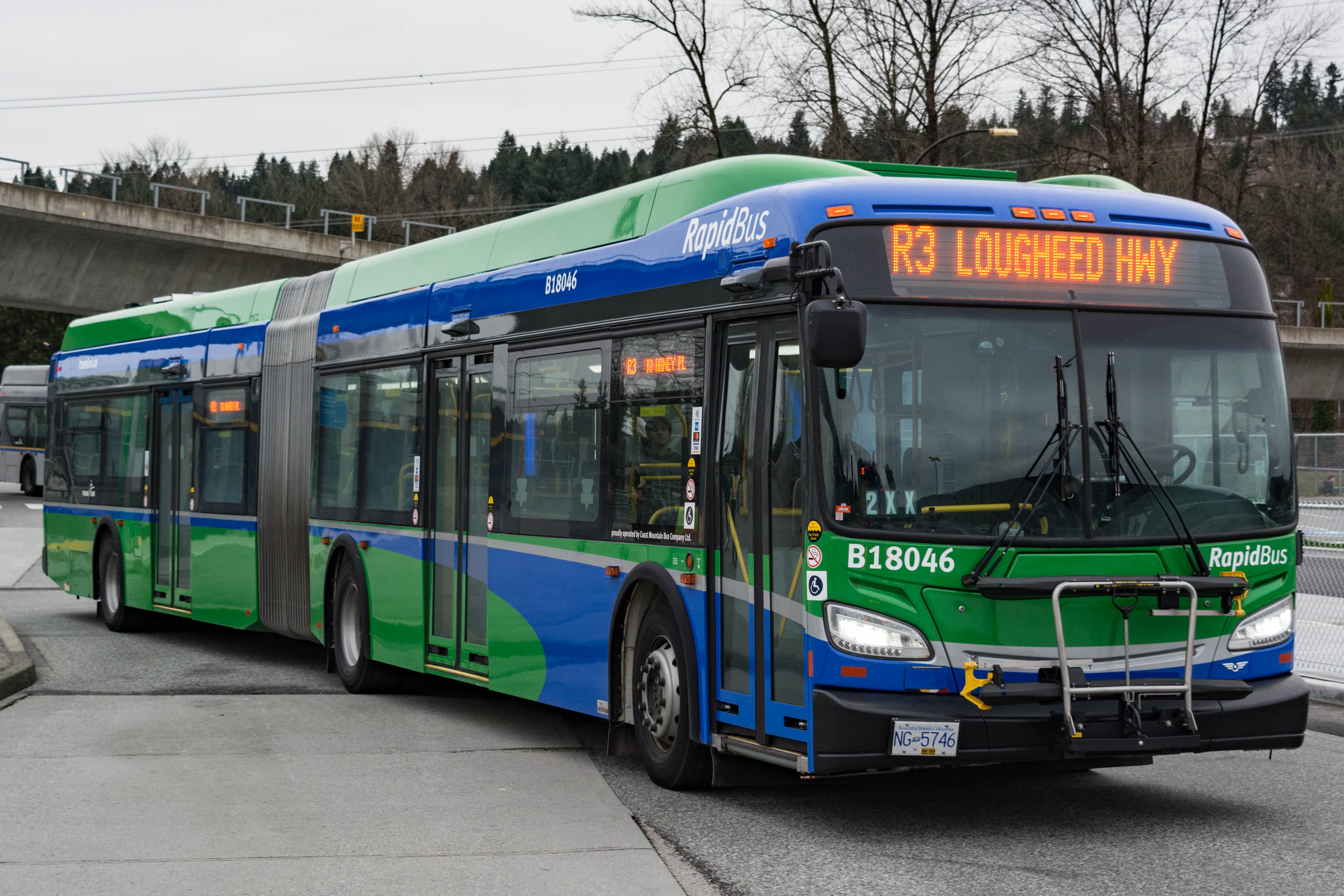
- R3 RapidBus departing Coquitlam Central station

Overview
- System: Translink
- Operator: Coast Mountain Bus Company
- Began service: January 6, 2020

Route
- Start: Coquitlam Central station
- End: Haney Place Exchange
- Length: 17.2 km (10.7 mi)
- Stops: 8

Service
- Ridership: 3,080 (avg. weekday; 2025)
Route map
R3 Lougheed Hwy highlighted in green
Key

The R3 Lougheed Hwy is an express bus service with bus rapid transit elements in Metro Vancouver, British Columbia, Canada. Part of TransLink's RapidBus network, it travels along Lougheed Highway and connects Coquitlam, Port Coquitlam, Pitt Meadows, and Maple Ridge.

== History ==
On November 23, 2016, the Mayors' Council and TransLink's board of directors approved the first phase of the 10-Year Vision, which included provisions for new B-Line routes (including the Lougheed Highway B-Line). On July 23, 2019, the route was officially rebranded the R3 Lougheed Hwy RapidBus. The R3 began service on January 6, 2020.

== Route description ==
The R3 Lougheed Hwy mainly travels along Lougheed Highway (Highway 7); in Maple Ridge, it also travels along 226th Street.

=== Stops ===
- Coquitlam Central Station – Western terminus; connections to Millennium Line and the West Coast Express
- Westwood Street
- Shaughnessy Street
- Ottawa Street
- Harris Road
- 203 Street
- Laity Street
- Haney Place Exchange – Eastern terminus

== See also ==
- List of bus routes in Metro Vancouver
