= South Delta Exchange =

Public transit exchange in British Columbia, Canada

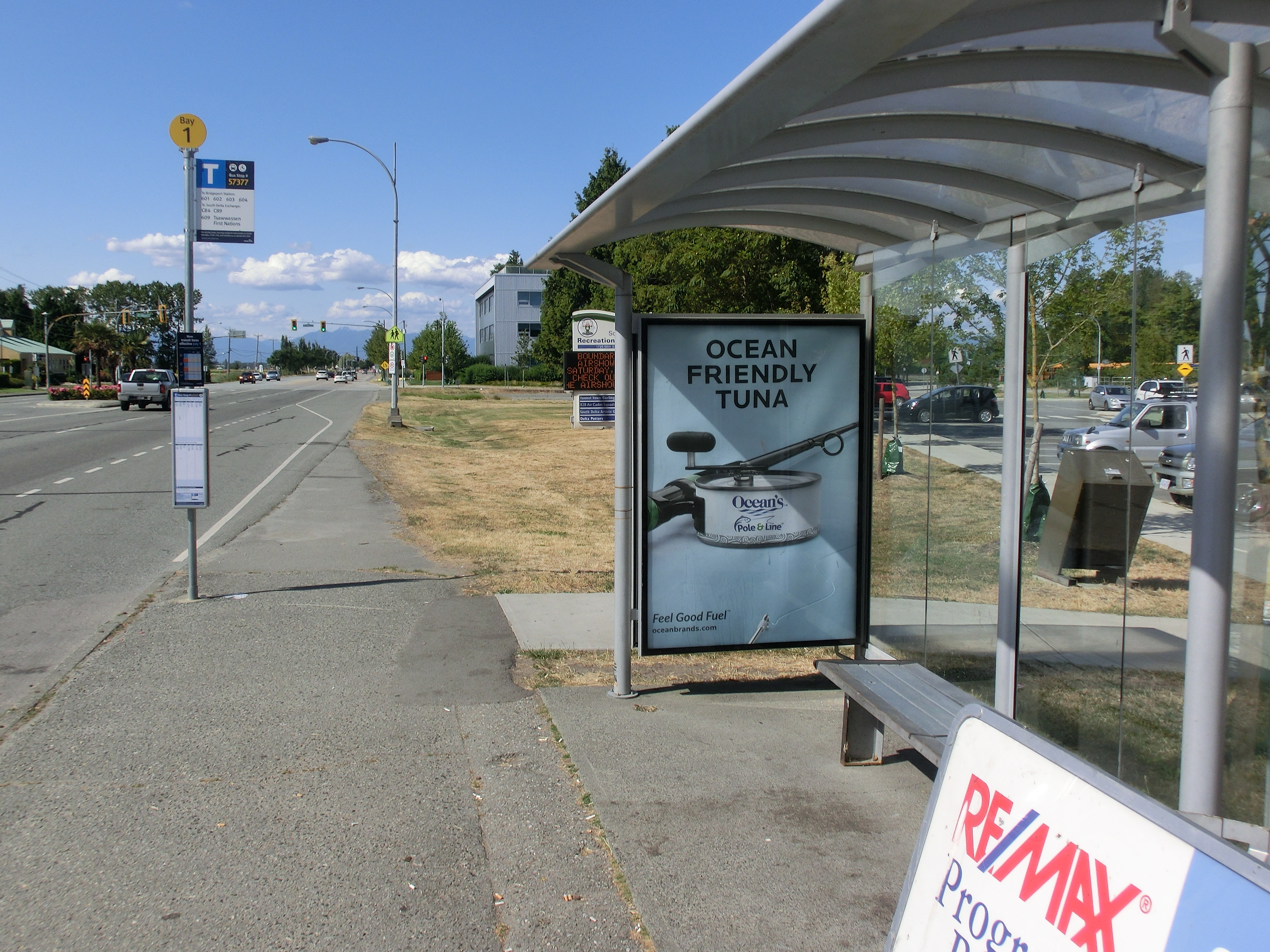

General information
- Location: 56 Street at 18 Avenue; Delta, British Columbia; Canada
- Coordinates: 49°2′8″N 123°4′6″W
- Operator: TransLink
- Bus routes: 7
- Bus stands: 3
- Bus operators: Coast Mountain Bus Company

Other information
- Fare zone: 3

History
- Opened: October 31, 1975
Location

South Delta Exchange is a transit exchange located adjacent to the South Delta Recreation Centre in the community of Tsawwassen, British Columbia, Canada. Opened on October 31, 1975, the exchange serves Delta and Richmond.

== Routes ==
Bay	Route	Destination	Notes
1	601	Bridgeport Station	
1	602	Bridgeport Station	AM peak hours only
1	603	Bridgeport Station	AM peak hours only
1	604	Bridgeport Station	AM peak hours only
1	614; 619	South Delta Exchange	
2	601	South Delta	
2	601	Boundary Bay	Peak hours only
2	602	Tsawwassen Heights	PM peak hours only
2	603	Beach Grove	Peak hours only
2	604	English Bluff	Peak hours only
2	609	Ladner Exchange	Via Tsawwassen First Nation
2	614	English Bluff	
2	619	Boundary Bay	
3	614	English Bluff	
3	619	Boundary Bay	

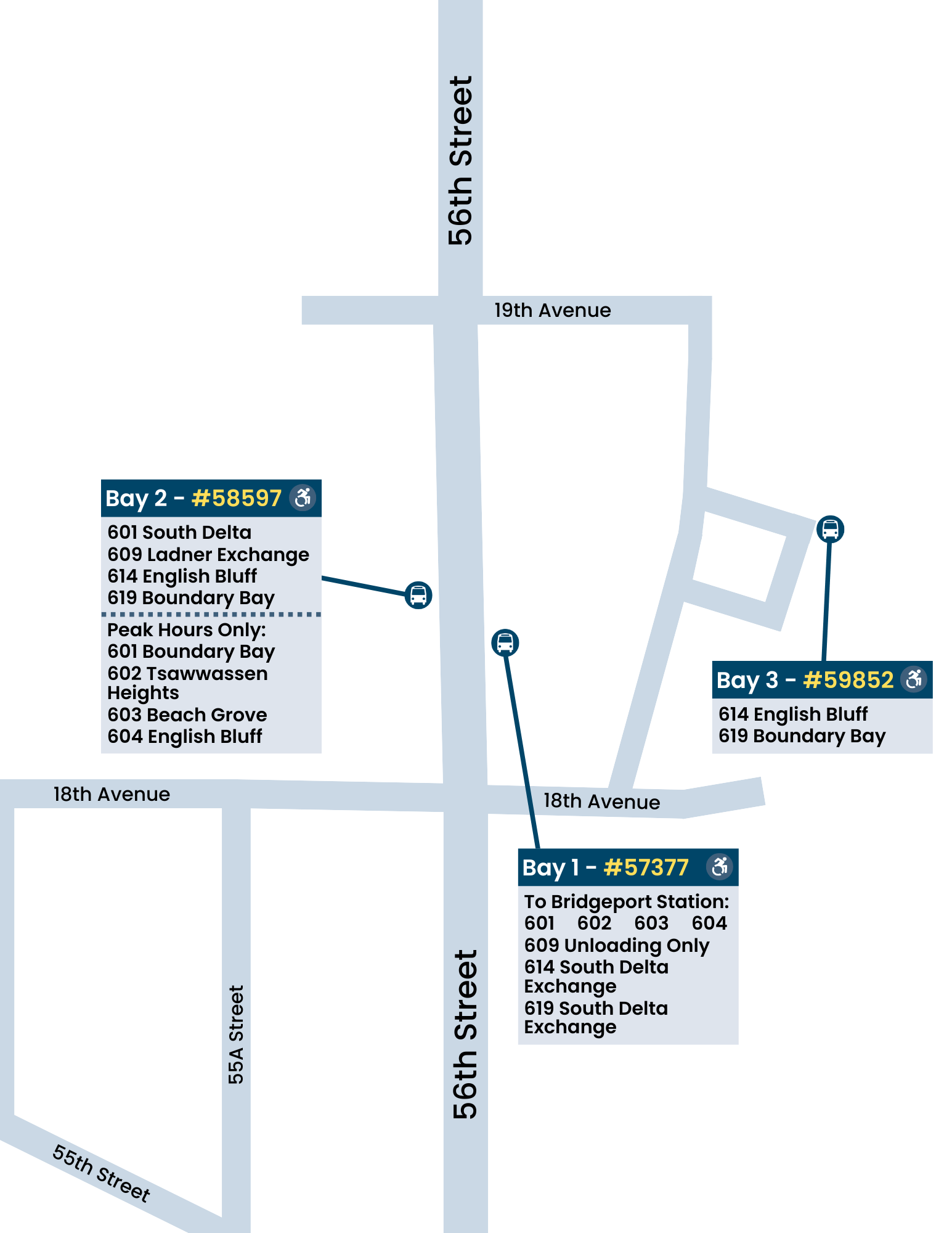
South Delta Exchange bus connection map

== See also ==
- List of bus routes in Metro Vancouver
