= Steveston Exchange =

Transit exchange in Richmond, British Columbia

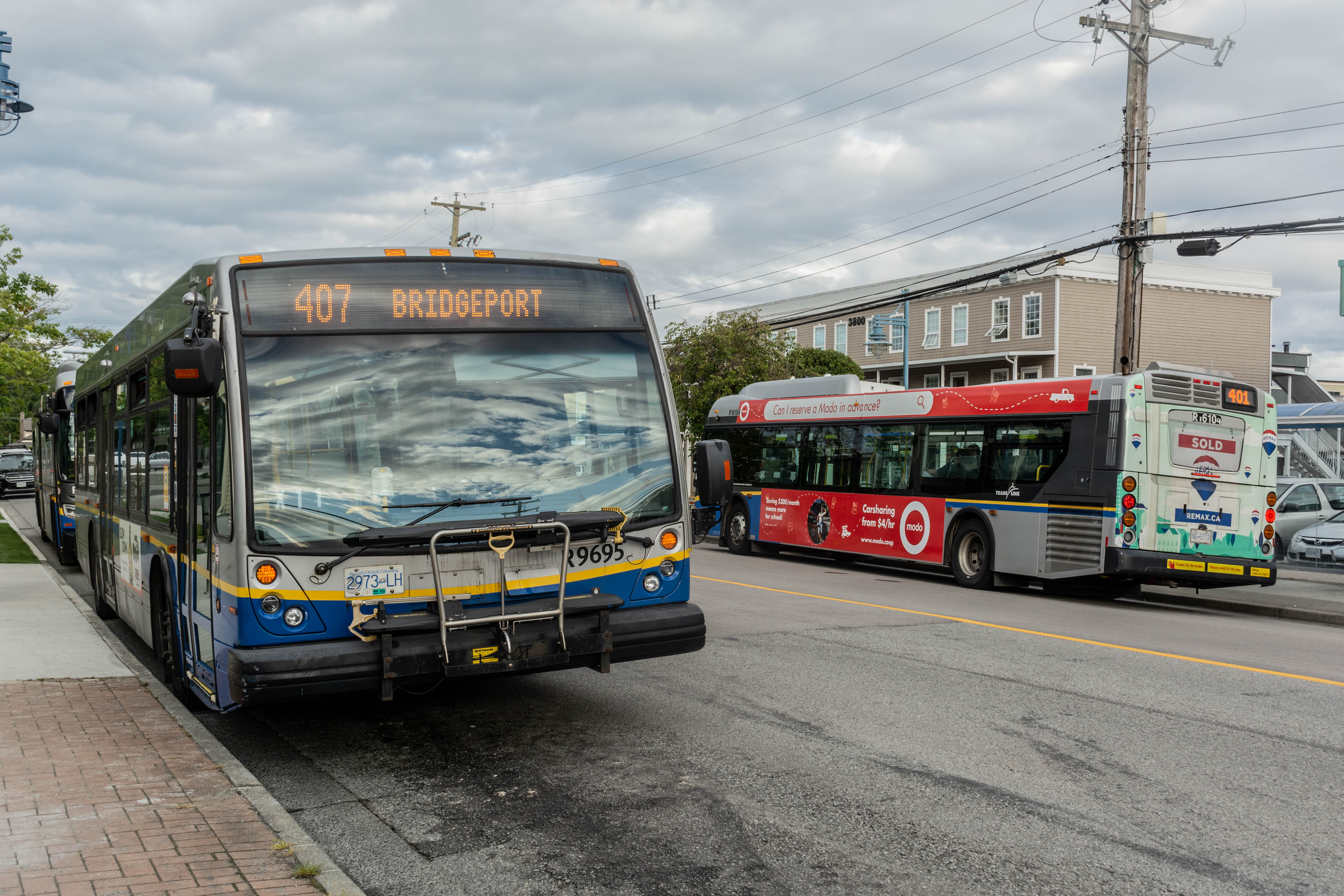
- TransLink buses waiting at Steveston Exchange

General information
- Location: Chatham Street and 2nd Avenue; Richmond, British Columbia; Canada
- Coordinates: 49°07′35″N 123°11′03″W
- Operator: TransLink
- Bus routes: 5
- Bus stands: 3
- Bus operators: Coast Mountain Bus Company

Other information
- Fare zone: 2

History
- Opened: September 7, 2020
Location

Steveston Exchange is a transit exchange serving the Steveston village area of Richmond, British Columbia, Canada. Buses have served the area since the late 1950s but Steveston was not indicated on system maps as an exchange until 2013. It was given an official exchange designation on September 7, 2020. There are five routes that connect to various areas of Richmond.

== Routes ==
The following routes serve the exchange:

Bay	Location	Route	Destination	Notes
1	Chatham Street; Eastbound	Unloading only		
2	Chatham Street; Eastbound	401	Brighouse Station	Via No. 1 Road and Westminster Highway
2	Chatham Street; Eastbound	402	Brighouse Station	Via No. 2 Road and Blundell Road
2	Chatham Street; Eastbound	413	Riverport	
3	Chatham Street; Westbound	406	Brighouse Station	Via Railway Avenue and Granville Avenue
3	Chatham Street; Westbound	407	Bridgeport	

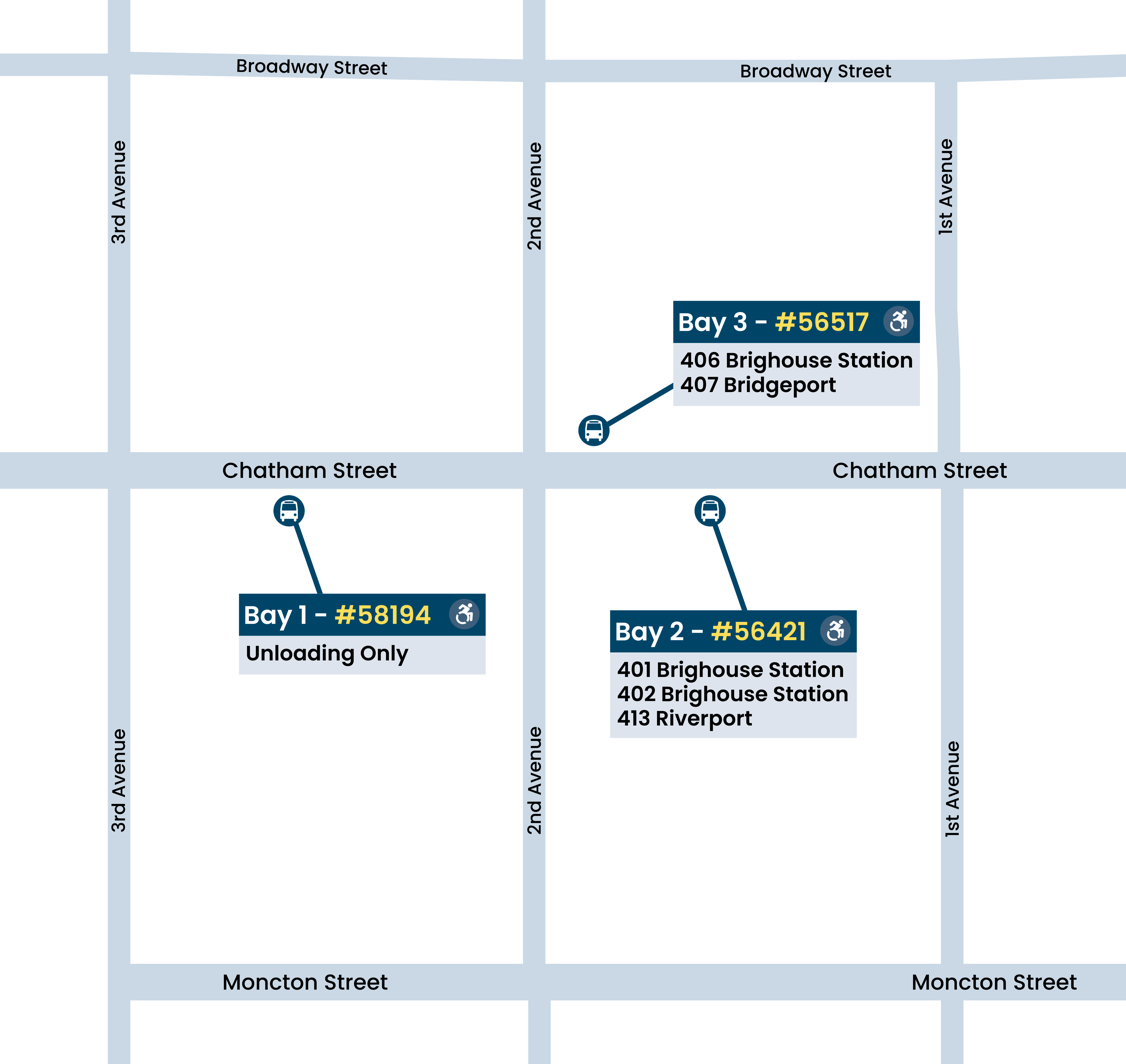
Steveston Exchange bus route connection map

== See also ==
- List of bus routes in Metro Vancouver
