= R2 Marine–Willingdon =

Express bus service in Metro Vancouver, Canada

- An R2 Marine–Willingdon to Metrotown

Overview
- System: TransLink
- Operator: Coast Mountain Bus Company
- Began service: April 6, 2020

Route
- Start: Park Royal Exchange
- End: Metrotown station
- Stops: 18

Service
- Ridership: 5,720 (avg. weekday; 2025)
Route map
R2 Marine Dr highlighted in green
Key

The R2 Marine–Willingdon (originally the R2 Marine Dr) is an express bus service with bus rapid transit elements in Metro Vancouver, British Columbia, Canada. Part of TransLink's RapidBus network, it connects major North Shore transit points Park Royal Exchange, Lonsdale Quay, and Phibbs Exchange. In 2026, the route was extended to cross the Ironworkers Memorial Bridge and connect East Vancouver's Kootenay Loop and Burnaby's Brentwood Town Centre and Metrotown stations via Hastings Street and Willingdon Avenue.

The route started service on April 6, 2020. It is operated by Coast Mountain Bus Company and funded by TransLink.

All articulated buses used on this route are hybrid and air-conditioned. Although articulated buses are mainly assigned, standard buses may be assigned instead.

== History ==
According to phase one of the Mayors' Council 10-Year Vision, the plan was to have the route operate as a B-Line between Dundarave in West Vancouver and Phibbs Exchange via Park Royal. In March 2019, after opposition from West Vancouver residents, the city of West Vancouver decided that the western terminus of the route would be at Park Royal instead of Dundarave.

In July 2019, the proposed new B-Line routes in phase one of the Mayors' Council 10-Year Vision were re-branded to RapidBus.

Construction delays became prevalent in September 2019. As a result, the service did not make its debut in January 2020 along with the other RapidBus routes. Instead, the route started service in the second quarter of 2020.

The service began operations on April 6, 2020, as part of TransLink's Spring 2020 service changes. The route replaced route 239 between Phibbs Exchange and Park Royal, with local service being maintained through the use of other routes.

On September 7, 2026, the route was extended to Metrotown station in Burnaby.

== Route description ==
Departing from Phibbs Exchange, the R2 RapidBus travels west along Main Street and Cotton Road towards 3rd Street, Lonsdale Avenue and into Lonsdale Quay. It then returns to 3rd Street and continues west to Park Royal Exchange along Marine Drive.

=== Stops ===
First phase of R2 RapidBus on April 6, 2020:

- Park Royal Exchange – Serves Park Royal Shopping Centre and is a major transfer point for other local and express bus services to Downtown Vancouver, West Vancouver, and Horseshoe Bay
- Capilano Road
- Pemberton Avenue
- Hamilton Avenue
- Bewicke Avenue
- Lonsdale Quay – Connects to bus routes serving North Vancouver and the SeaBus ferry service into Downtown Vancouver and serves the Lonsdale Quay public market
- 3rd Street–Lonsdale Avenue
- Ridgeway Avenue
- Brooksbank Avenue
- Phibbs Exchange – Major transfer point for other routes serving North Vancouver, Vancouver, and Burnaby

Second phase of R2 RapidBus on September 7, 2026:

- Kootenay Loop – Connects to the R5 Hastings St
- Gilmore Avenue – Connects to the R5 Hastings St
- Hastings Street–Willingdon Avenue – Connects to the R5 Hastings St
- Brentwood Town Centre station – Connects to the Millennium Line and the Amazing Brentwood
- British Columbia Institute of Technology
- Moscrop Street
- Kingsway
- Metrotown station – Major transfer point that serves the Expo Line

== See also ==
- 97 B-Line
- 98 B-Line
- 99 B-Line
- List of bus routes in Metro Vancouver
