= Ladner Exchange =

Bus exchange in Delta, Canada

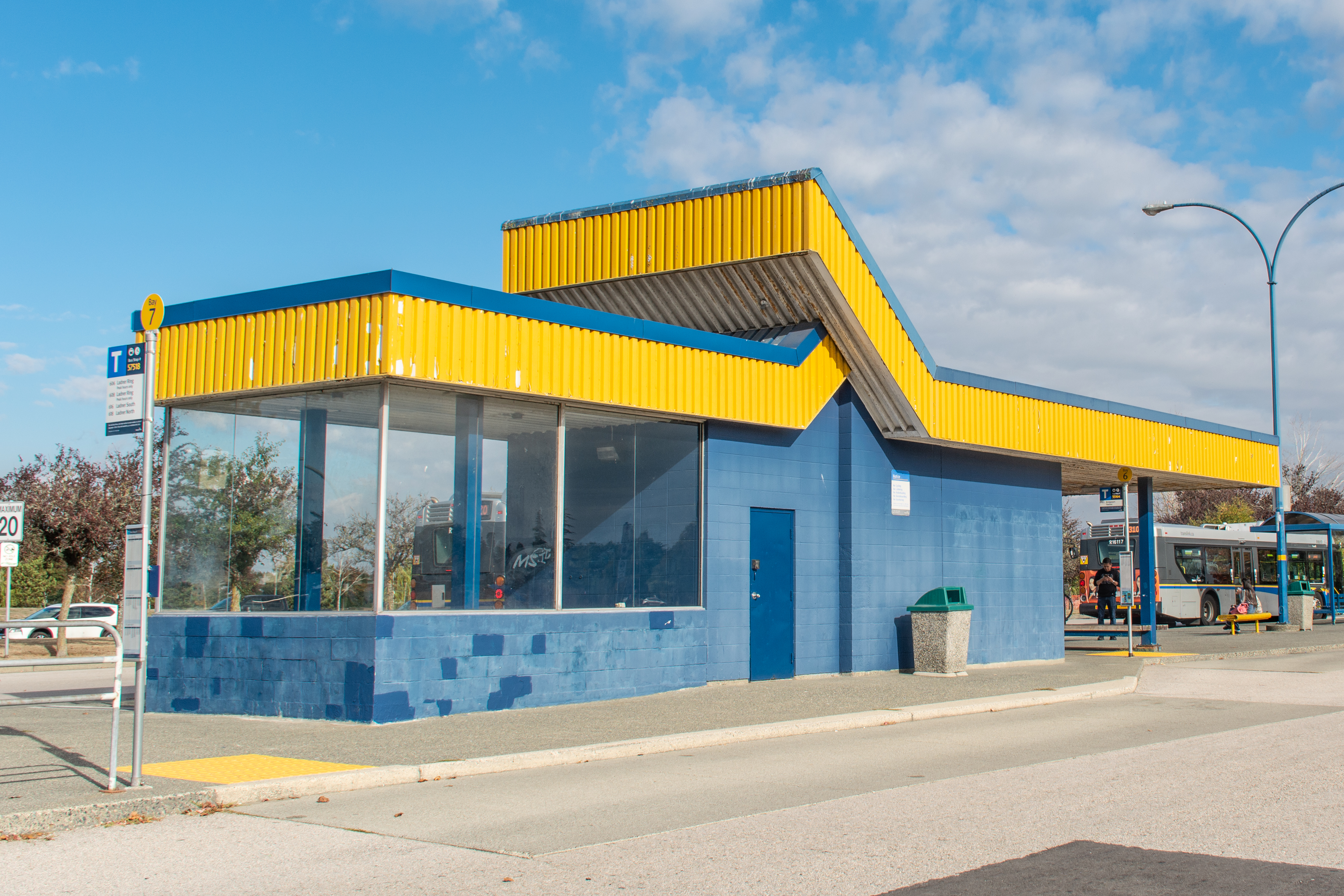

General information
- Location: 4645 Harvest Drive, Delta, British Columbia; Canada
- Coordinates: 49°05′15″N 123°03′45″W
- System: Bus Exchange
- Owner: TransLink
- Bus routes: 9
- Bus stands: 7

Construction
- Parking: 200 space park and ride
- Cycle facilities: Racks available

Other information
- Fare zone: 3

History
- Opened: November 24, 1978
Location

The Ladner Exchange is a major transit exchange in the community of Ladner within the city of Delta, British Columbia. Opened on November 24, 1978, it is the primary transit hub for South Delta, serving as a terminus for all but two routes and includes connections to SkyTrain stations in Richmond and Surrey. There is a 200-space park and ride and kiss and ride adjacent to the exchange.

== Structure and location ==
The exchange is located off-street near the major intersection of Ladner Trunk Road and Highway 17A, providing for easy access for both buses and drivers alike. It also serves multiple destinations nearby, including Delta City Hall, Ladner Leisure Centre and Delta Hospital. There are several open-sided shelters with benches on site. It has the ability to host a variety of standard and articulated buses as well as double-decker buses.

== Transit connections ==
| Bay | Route | Notes |
|---|---|---|
| 1 | 310 Scottsdale | |
| 1 | 620 Bridgeport Station | Express |
| 1 | 900 Bike Bus to Bridgeport Station | Seasonal service: runs on Fridays, weekends and holidays; Express |
| 2 | 310 Ladner; 51 Street at 47 Avenue | |
| 2 | 620 Tsawwassen Ferry | Express |
| 2 | 900 Bike Bus to Tsawwassen Ferry Terminal | Seasonal service: runs on Fridays, weekends and holidays; Express |
| 3 | 609 South Delta Exchange | via Tsawwassen First Nation |
| 4 | 640 Scott Road Station | |
| 5 | 601 South Delta; 2nd Avenue at 52a Street | Certain AM peak hour trips originate at Ladner Exchange as a continuation of the 608 and certain PM peak hour trips terminate at Ladner Exchange and continue as the 606. |
| 6 | 601 Bridgeport Station | Certain AM peak hour trips originate at Ladner Exchange as a continuation of the 608 and certain PM peak hour trips terminate at Ladner Exchange and continue as the 606. |
| 7 | 606 Ladner Ring | PM peak only |
| 7 | 608 Ladner Ring | AM peak only |
| 7 | 618 Ladner South; 46A Street at River Road | |
| 7 | 618 Ladner North; Ferry Road at Commodore Drive | |

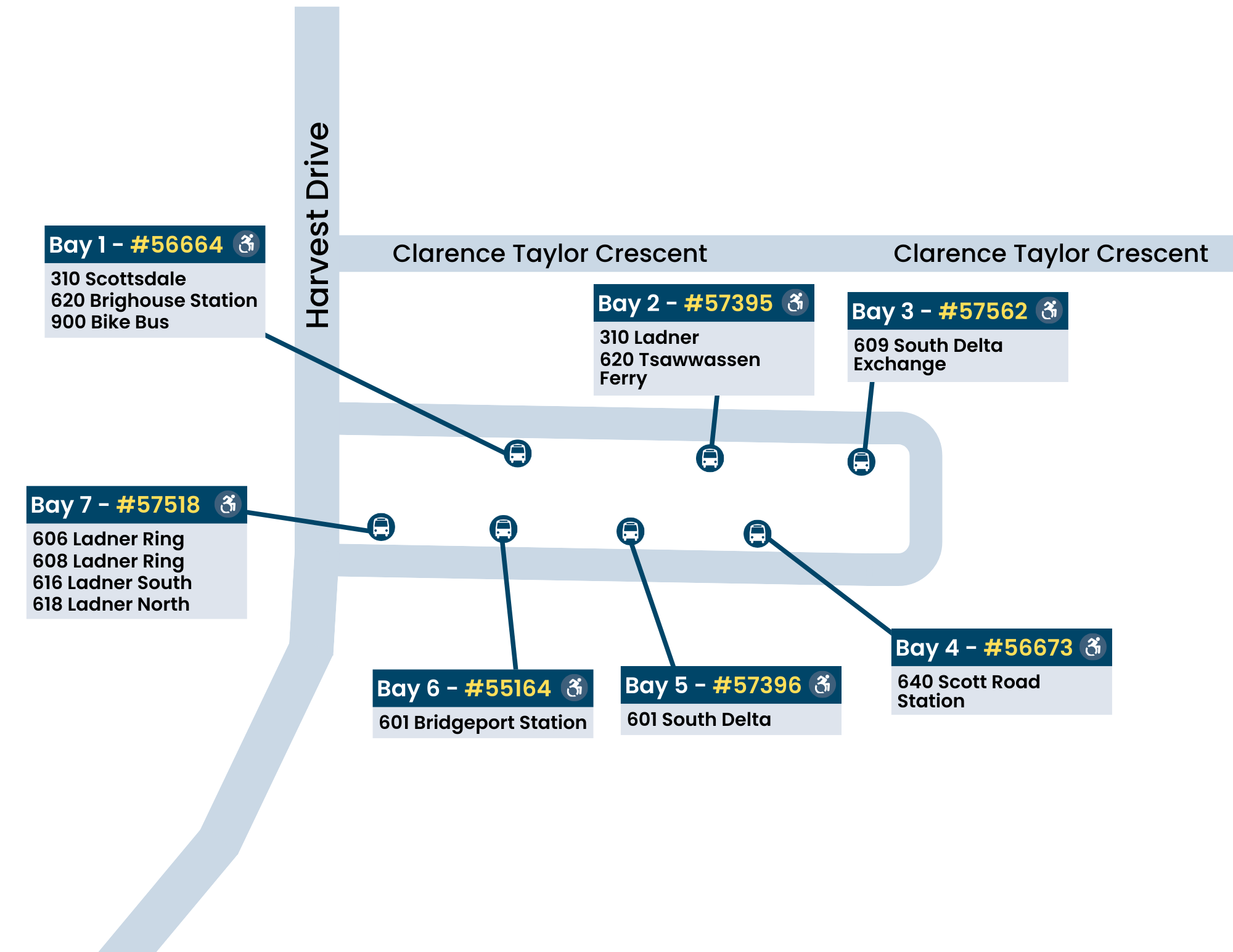
Ladner Exchange bus bay map

== See also ==
- List of bus routes in Metro Vancouver
