= Thornhill, Maple Ridge =

Coordinates: 49.183°N 122.504°W

The neighbourhood of Thornhill on the south slope of Grant Hill in Maple Ridge, British Columbia, Canada, forms the western part of the historical community of Whonnock. The lower part along the Fraser River attracted some early settlers, but the higher land only became populated after the First World War, when Japanese farmers were among the first to open its land for agriculture. After the Japanese were evicted in 1942, their lands became available to a growing community of young white families.

== Institutions ==
=== Thornhill Elementary School ===
As the Japanese children before the war, the children of the post-war residents attended – and still attend today – the Whonnock Elementary School. Only for a decade, from 1959 to 1969, did Thornhill have its own elementary school at the southwest corner of Spilsbury Street and 96th Avenue.

=== Thornhill Community Hall ===
After the opening of their own school the residents formed the Thornhill Community Association and raised funds for the building of a small community hall. The hall opened in 1965 and is still at the centre of community life.
