= West Vancouver Blue Bus =

Public bus service in West Vancouver, Canada

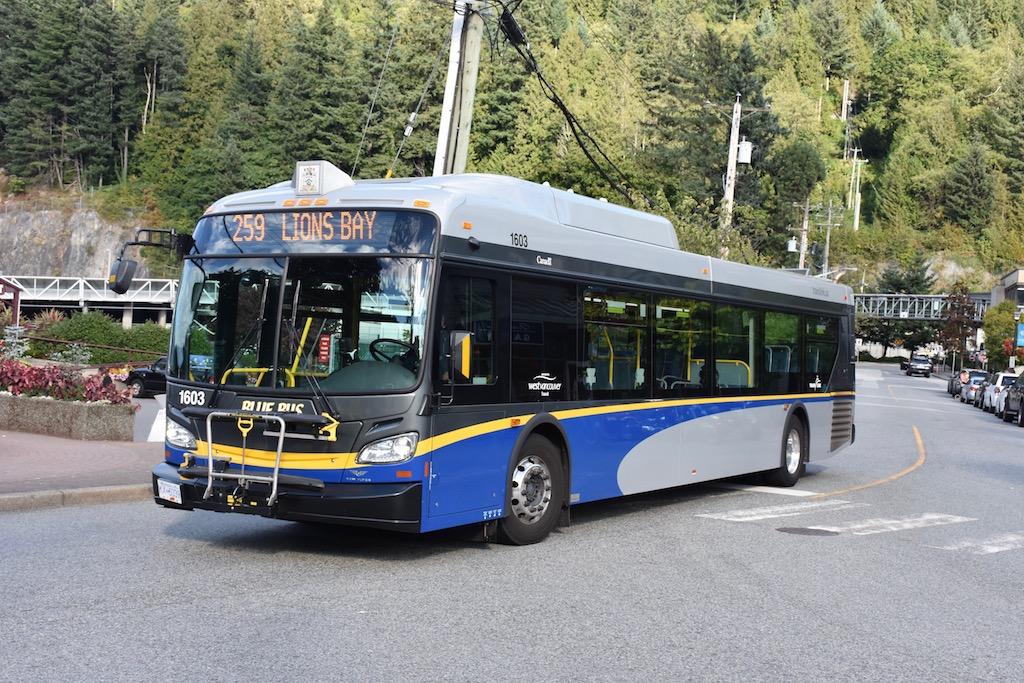
- Parent: West Vancouver
- Founded: 1914
- Headquarters: 221 Lloyd Avenue, North Vancouver
- Service area: West Vancouver, North Vancouver, Vancouver, Lions Bay
- Routes: 12
- Fleet: 62
- Website: Blue Bus

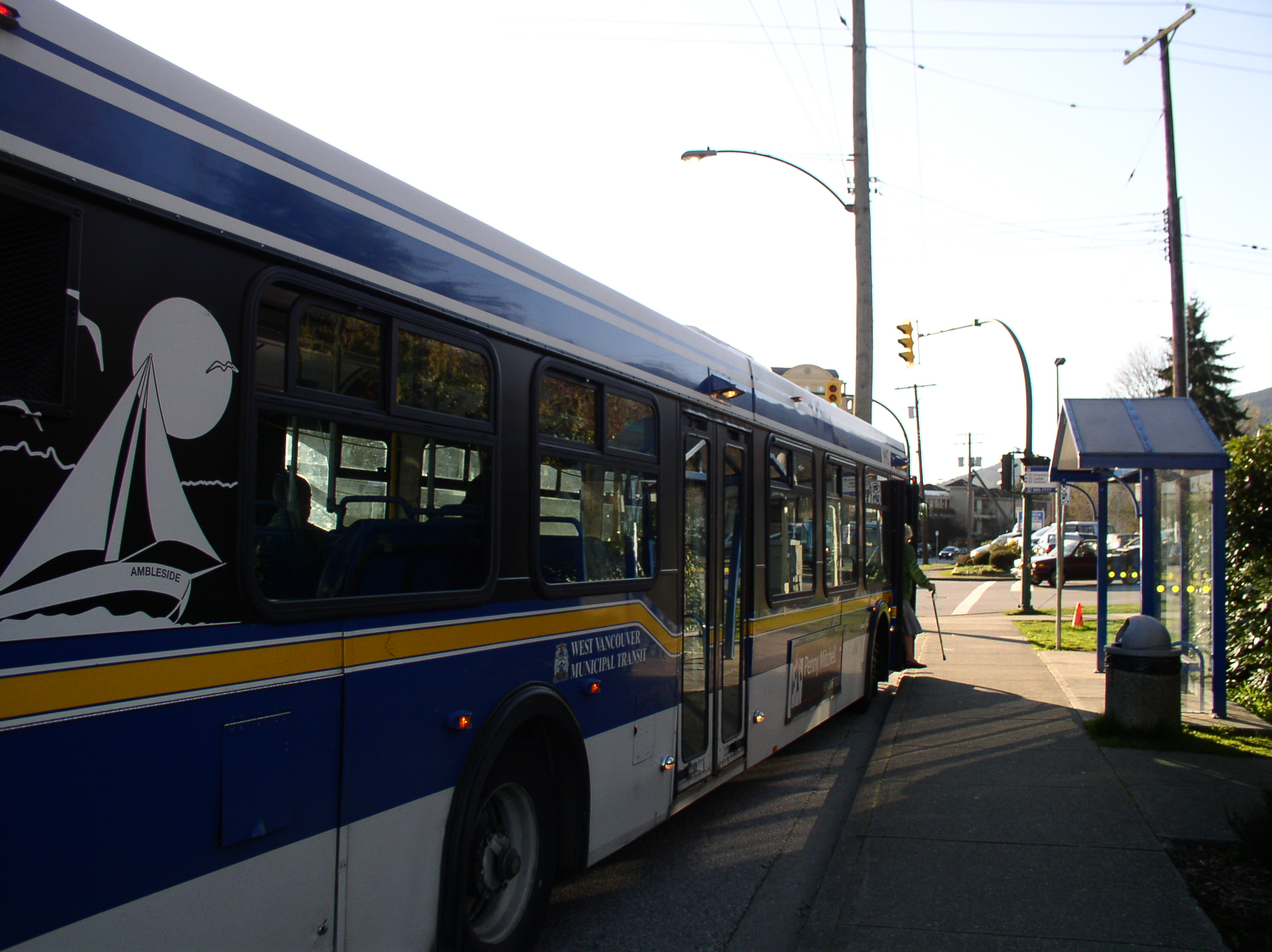
A side view of a West Vancouver Blue Bus New Flyer Industries D40LF

West Vancouver Blue Bus, formally West Vancouver Municipal Transit, was founded in 1914 and is one of the oldest continuously operated municipal systems in North America. The system was transferred to BC Transit in 1981 and now operates as a sub-contractor for TransLink, Metro Vancouver's regional transportation authority.

== Routes ==
As of April 2020, Blue Bus operates the following 12 routes, serving the cities of West Vancouver, North Vancouver, Vancouver and the Village of Lions Bay:

- 214 Phibbs Exchange / Blueridge (Operates Community Shuttle service during off-peak times)
- 215 Phibbs Exchange / Indian River
- 227 Phibbs Exchange / Lynn Valley Centre
- 250 Vancouver / Horseshoe Bay / Dundarave (250A)
- 251 Park Royal / Queens
- 252 Park Royal / Inglewood
- 253 Vancouver / Park Royal / Caulfeild
- 254 Vancouver / Park Royal / British Properties
- 255 Capilano University / Dundarave
- 256 Park Royal / Whitby Estates Spuraway
- 262 Lions Bay / Caulfeild

All buses are designated "Fare Paid Zones", which means passengers are required by law to have a valid fare while on board the bus. Failing to pay the fare or not having a valid fare while on board the bus could result in the passenger being fined $173 and/or removed from the bus. Fare inspections are conducted by Transit Security Officers and members from the South Coast British Columbia Transportation Authority Police Service.

== Active fleet ==
All active West Vancouver Blue Bus vehicles are owned by TransLink. West Vancouver Blue Bus owned their own buses until August 2019.

Model Year	Picture	Manufacturer	Model	Fleet	Notes
2007		Nova Bus	LFS	701–706 (6)	
2009		Nova Bus	LFS	901–909 (9)	909 struck a fire hydrant at 15th St and Chesterfield Ave on March 27, 2016
2012/2016		New Flyer Industries	XD40	1201–1217, 1601–1614 (31)	
2019/2024		Chevrolet/Arboc	G4500/SOM28G	19501–19502, 19536-19537, 24501-24505, 24540-24548 (16)	

=== Numbering ===
West Vancouver buses are numbered by production year and unit number. For example, bus number 1201 would be produced in 2012, and the first unit received from that order. Exceptions to this are buses built before 1991 and Community Shuttles built before 2013. Since 2017, Community Shuttles follow the standard TransLink numbering system, adding a "5" in between the year and unit number to denote its place in TransLink's Community Shuttle "500" series.

== Retired/transferred fleet ==
Year	Picture	Manufacturer	Model	Fleet (Qty.)	Notes
1961		General Motors	TDH-4517	61 (1)	
1991		New Flyer Industries	D60	912–914 (3)	
1992		Orion Bus Industries	Orion I	921–929 (9)	
1995		New Flyer Industries	D40LF	951–959, 961–968 (17)	
1996		New Flyer Industries	D40LF	971 (1)	
1998		NovaBus	LFS	981 (1)	
1999		New Flyer Industries	D40LF	990–998 (9)	
2005		General Motors	GMC C5500 Community Shuttle	S200–S201, S261 (3)	
2007		New Flyer Industries	D60LFR	712–714 (3)	
2008		Nova Bus	LFS	801–803 (3)	
2017-18	ARBOC	SOM	17501-17505, 18501-18509		
