= Lonsdale Quay =

Ferry terminal and transit exchange in Metro Vancouver, Canada

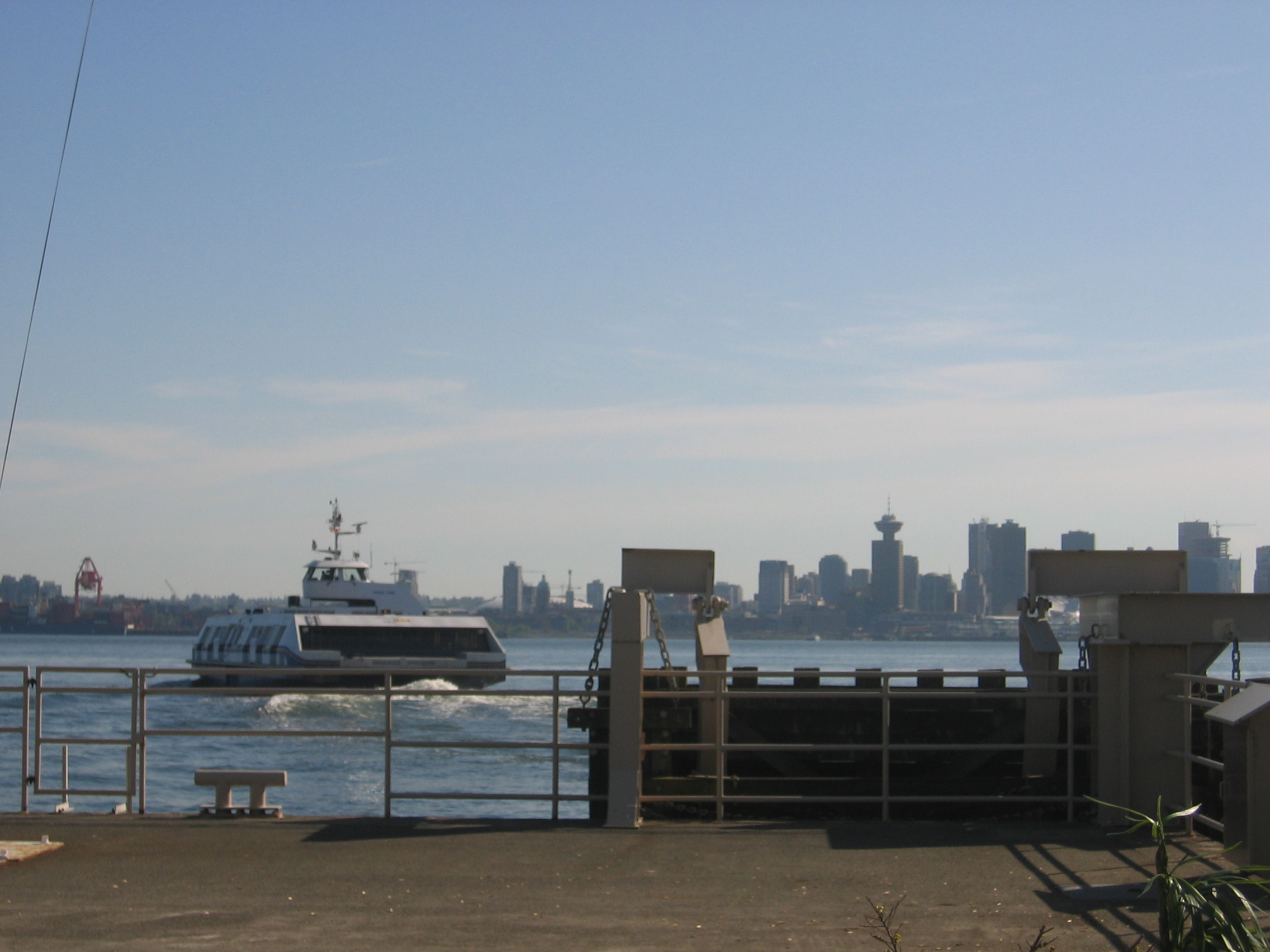
- A SeaBus departing Lonsdale Quay in 2006

General information
- Location: 151 Esplanade Ave, North Vancouver
- Coordinates: 49.310434°N 123.082778°W
- System: TransLink station
- Owner: TransLink
- Operator: Coast Mountain Bus Company
- Platforms: 1 centre platform 2 side platforms
- Bus routes: 8
- Bus stands: 8
- Connections: R2 Marine–Willingdon

Construction
- Accessible: Yes

Other information
- Fare zone: 2

History
- Opened: June 17, 1977

Services
Preceding station	TransLink	Following station
Waterfront Terminus	SeaBus	Terminus
Location

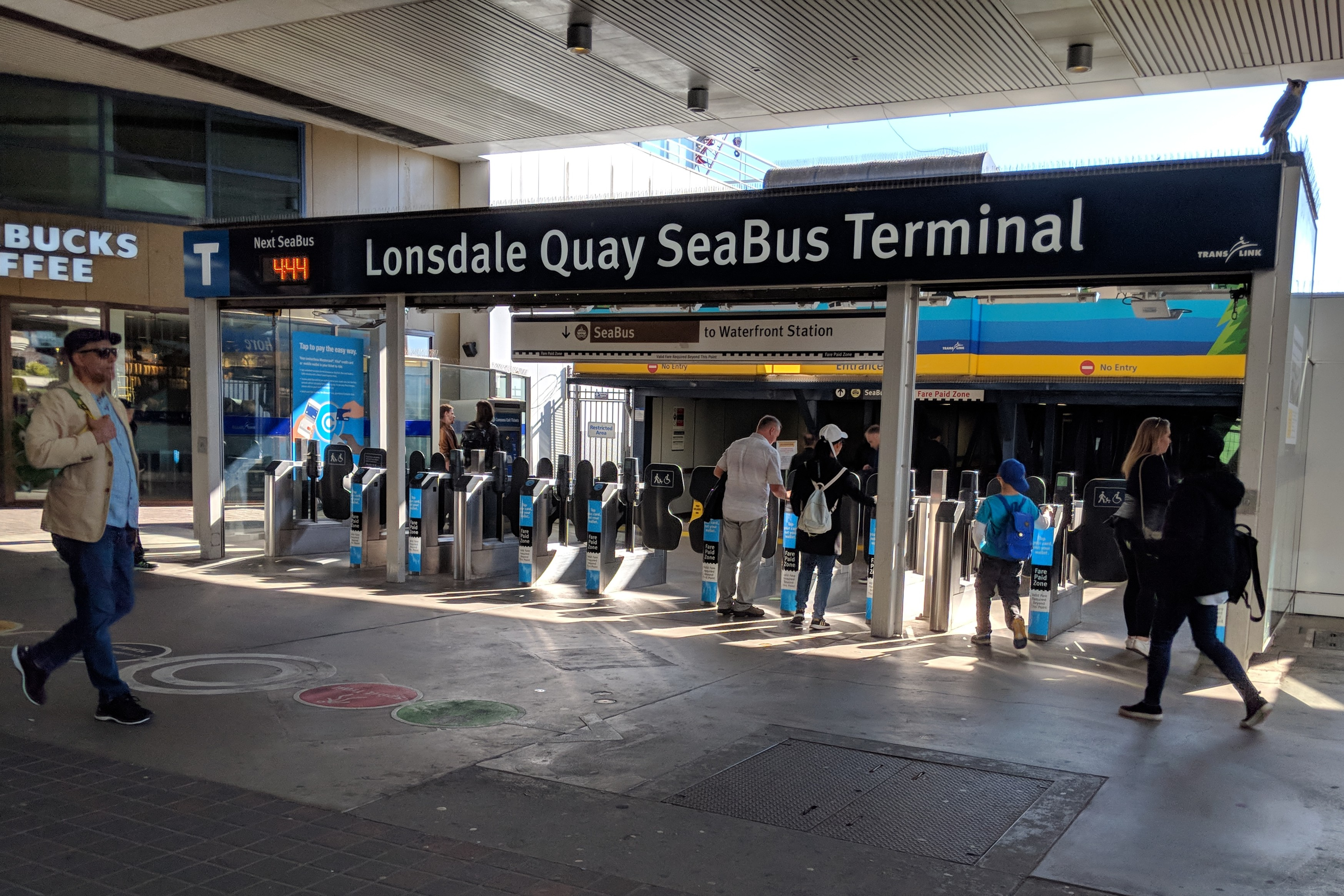
Entrance to the ferry terminal

Lonsdale Quay is a SeaBus ferry terminal and major transit exchange in the City of North Vancouver, and serves Metro Vancouver's North Shore municipalities. Located at the waterfront of the Lower Lonsdale neighbourhood, the transit hub is within short distance from the BCIT Marine Campus and Lonsdale Quay Market.

== History ==
Lonsdale Quay opened in 1977 when the SeaBus service began between the quay and Waterfront station in Downtown Vancouver. Prior to the construction of the ferry terminal, the quay was the location of the North Van Ship Repair dock.

In 2016, it was announced that Lonsdale Quay, along with the Waterfront SeaBus terminal, would receive a $12.5 million upgrade. Construction was originally expected to begin in 2017 and to be completed by mid-2018; however, the project timeline was pushed back. Construction began on April 29, 2019, and was fully completed in June 2020.

== Services ==
Lonsdale Quay's SeaBus service crosses Burrard Inlet to Waterfront station in Downtown Vancouver. From there, transit users can connect to other TransLink services, including the SkyTrain rapid transit system and the West Coast Express commuter train.

Security for the bus loop and SeaBus terminal is the responsibility of the Transit Security Department. Transit security officers can be found patrolling the bus loop and the SeaBus terminal. Transit security officers also conduct fare inspections on board the buses and within the Fare Paid Zone of the SeaBus terminal. North Vancouver Royal Canadian Mounted Police also patrol the bus loop and SeaBus terminal.

== Station information ==
=== Entrances ===
The Lonsdale Quay SeaBus terminal is served by a single entrance at the south end of the bus exchange. Chadwick Court is the street closest to the entrance, though it also connects to the bus exchange.

=== Transit connections ===
A covered bus loop is connected to Lonsdale Quay, from which passengers can board buses to Grouse Mountain, Lynn Valley, West Vancouver and other points of interest on the North Shore. Bus bay assignments are as follows:

Route #	Bay #	Stop #	Destinations	Notes
R2	3	58724	Park Royal	RapidBus service
R2	7	54410	Metrotown station	RapidBus service
228	2	54196	Lynn Valley Underwood at Dempsey	
229	6	54134	Lynn Valley Lynn Valley Center	Provides service along Lonsdale until 29th Street
230	8	54516	Upper Lonsdale Prospect at Rockland	
231	4	58725	Harbourside Bodwell High School	Trips only operate during peak hours
236	1	54421	Grouse Mountain	Limited Saturday and Sunday morning trips operate as 236 Pemberton Heights
249	5	50980	Delbrook Montroyal at Glencanyon	After Montroyal and Glencanyon, bus route changes to 246 Downtown/Highlands; The last 6 trips at night terminate at Marine and Garden; First early morning weekday trip terminates at Marine and Garden
