= R5 Hastings St =

Express bus service in Metro Vancouver, Canada

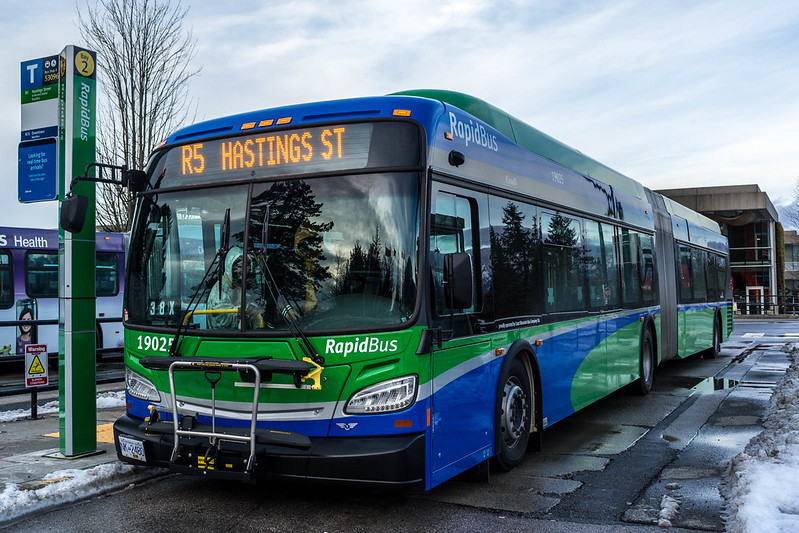
- R5 Hastings St loading at SFU

Overview
- System: TransLink
- Operator: Coast Mountain Bus Company
- Began service: December 19, 2016 (as 95 B-Line)

Route
- Start: Burrard station
- End: SFU Exchange
- Length: 17.2 km (10.7 mi)
- Stops: 16

Service
- Ridership: 13,160 (avg. weekday, 2025)
Route map
R5 Hastings St highlighted in green
Key

The R5 Hastings St is an express bus service with bus rapid transit elements in Metro Vancouver, Canada. Part of TransLink's RapidBus network, it travels along Hastings Street, a major east–west route, and connects Simon Fraser University to the SkyTrain system's Burrard station on the Expo Line in Downtown Vancouver. It replaced the 95 B-Line route on January 6, 2020.

== History ==
Originally known as the 95 B-Line, the route started service on December 19, 2016, shortly after the opening of the Millennium Line's Evergreen Extension earlier that month. The new B-Line service replaced route 135, which had operated service between Downtown Vancouver and Simon Fraser University since April 1997. Starting on January 1, 2018, passengers with Compass Cards or proof of payment are allowed to board from any of the three doors on the bus. Passengers who are paying cash must board through the front door. On July 23, 2019, TransLink announced plans to launch a new express bus route to rebrand the B-Line service. The upgrades were completed in early January 2020, with the first service on the new R5 Hastings St beginning January 6.

The R5 Hastings St RapidBus was the 13th busiest bus route in Translink's network in 2025, with 4,143,000 total boardings.

== Stops and transfer points ==
The R5 Hastings St serves the following stops in Vancouver and Burnaby.

=== Vancouver ===
- Burrard station – Western terminus of the line connecting to the Expo Line and serving multiple bus routes traveling throughout Metro Vancouver to destinations including North Vancouver, Horseshoe Bay Ferry Terminal, University of British Columbia, and Richmond.
- Granville Street / Waterfront station – Connects to the Expo Line, Canada Line, West Coast Express, and SeaBus. Serves the satellite campus of SFU Harbour Centre.
- Cambie Street – Serves the Gastown neighbourhood, including SFU's School for the Contemporary Arts at Woodwards.
- Main Street – Serves the Downtown Eastside neighbourhood and Vancouver's Chinatown.
- Commercial Drive – Serves the Grandview–Woodland neighbourhood.
- Nanaimo Street – Serves the eastern edge of the Grandview–Woodland neighbourhood and the western edge of the Hastings–Sunrise neighbourhood.
- Renfrew Street – Serves the Pacific National Exhibition grounds and the Hastings–Sunrise neighbourhood.
- Kootenay Loop – Transit exchange that connects to the R2 Marine–Willingdon and serves routes to East Vancouver, Downtown Vancouver, Burnaby, North Vancouver and the Tri-Cities.

=== Burnaby ===
- Gilmore Avenue – Connects to the R2 Marine–Willingdon and serves the Burnaby Heights neighbourhood to the north and Willingdon Heights neighbourhood to the south.
- Willingdon Avenue – Connects to the R2 Marine–Willingdon and serves the eastern edges of the Burnaby Heights and Willingdon Heights neighbourhoods.
- Hythe Avenue – Serves the Capitol Hill and Brentwood Park neighbourhoods.
- Holdom Avenue – Serves the Capitol Hill neighbourhood
- Kensington Avenue – Serves the Kensington Square Shopping Centre and Burnaby North Secondary School.
- Duthie Avenue – Serves the Westridge neighbourhood and is the easternmost stop in Burnaby before entering Burnaby Mountain and Simon Fraser University.
- SFU Transportation Centre – Transit exchange for Simon Fraser University located near the centre of the Burnaby Mountain campus. Serves same bus routes as SFU Exchange.
- SFU Exchange – Eastern terminus of the line at Simon Fraser University with bus route connections to the Expo and Millennium Lines.

== See also ==
- 97 B-Line
- 98 B-Line
- 99 B-Line
- List of bus routes in Metro Vancouver
