= Waterfront station (Vancouver) =

Metro Vancouver public transportation facility

Waterfront
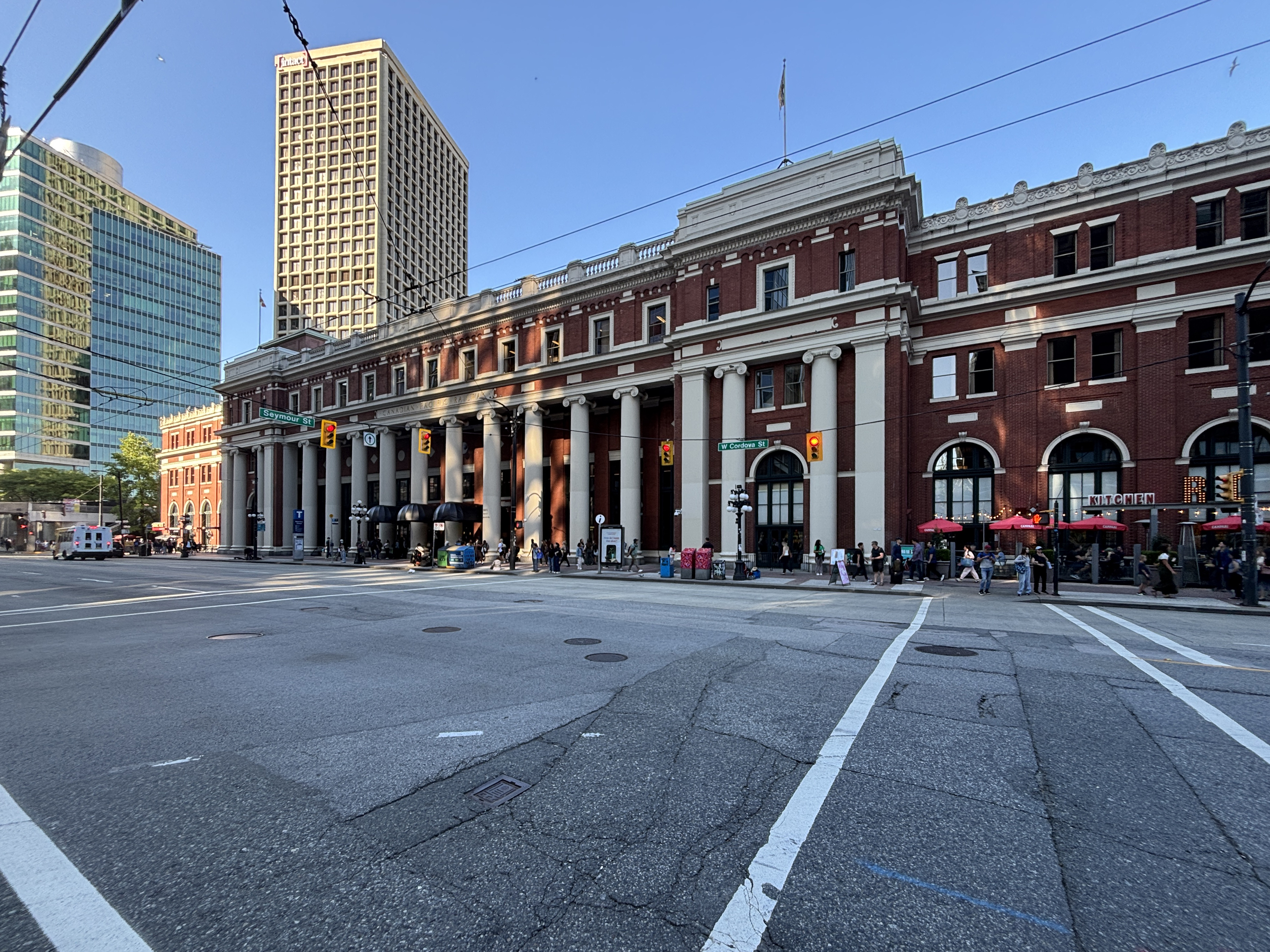
- Waterfront station in 2025

General information
- Location: 601 West Cordova Street, Vancouver; 439 Granville Street, Vancouver
- Coordinates: 49°17′09″N 123°06′42″W
- System: TransLink station
- Owner: Canadian Pacific Kansas City; TransLink; Cadillac Fairview (station building)
- Operator: TransLink
- Platforms: 3 separate sets of centre platforms
- Tracks: 6
- Connections: R5 Hastings St

Construction
- Structure type: At-grade and underground
- Cycle facilities: Outside bike racks
- Accessible: Yes
- Architect: Barott, Blackader and Webster

Other information
- Station code: WF
- Fare zone: 1

History
- Opened: August 1, 1914; 112 years ago

Key dates
- 1977: SeaBus opens
- 1985: SkyTrain: Expo Line opens
- 1995: West Coast Express opens
- 2002: SkyTrain: Millennium Line opens
- 2009: SkyTrain: Canada Line opens
- 2016: SkyTrain: Millennium Line rerouted

Passengers
- 2025: 10,684,000 (Expo and Canada Lines) 2% ▲; 825,000 (West Coast Express) 11.9% ▲
- Rank: 1 of 54 (Expo and Canada Lines); 1 of 8 (West Coast Express)

Services
Preceding station	TransLink	Following station
Terminus	Expo Line	Burrard towards King George or Production Way–University
Terminus	Canada Line	Vancouver City Centre towards Richmond–Brighouse or YVR–Airport
Terminus	SeaBus	Lonsdale Quay Terminus
Terminus	West Coast Express	Moody Centre towards Mission City
Former services
Preceding station	Canadian Pacific Railway	Following station
Terminus	Main Line	Heatley Avenue toward Montreal Windsor
Preceding station	TransLink	Following station
Terminus	Millennium Line	Burrard towards VCC–Clark via Columbia
Location

Waterfront station is a major intermodal public transportation facility and the main transit terminus in Vancouver, British Columbia, Canada. It is on West Cordova Street in Downtown Vancouver, between Granville and Seymour Street. The station is also accessible via two other street-level entrances, one on Howe Street to the west for direct access to the Expo Line and another on Granville Street to the south for direct access to the Canada Line.

The station is within walking distance of Vancouver's historical Gastown district, Canada Place, Vancouver Convention Centre, Harbour Centre, Sinclair Centre, and the Vancouver Harbour Flight Centre float plane terminal. A heliport operated by Helijet, along with the downtown campuses for Simon Fraser University and the British Columbia Institute of Technology, are also located within the vicinity of the station.

== History ==
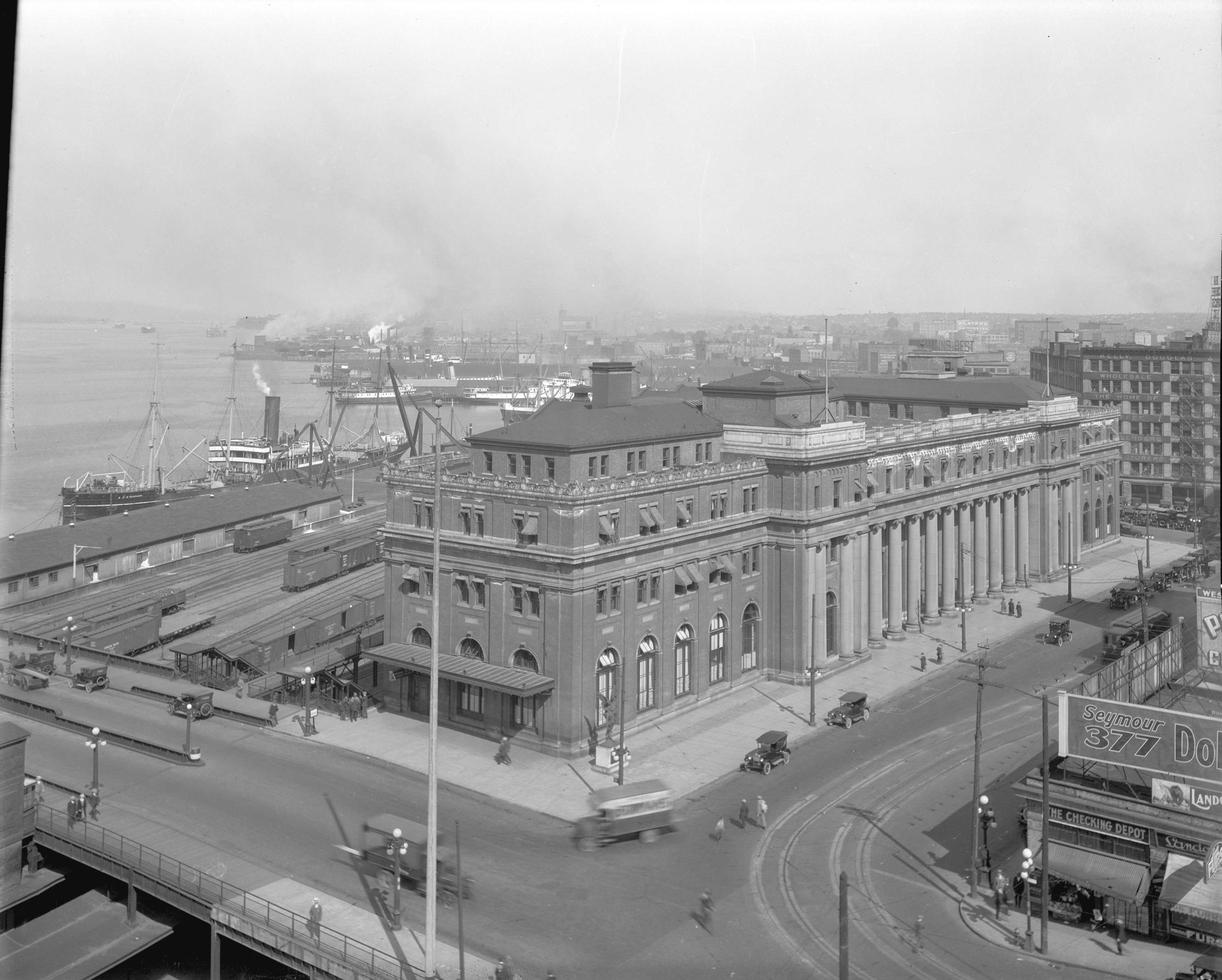
Waterfront station c. 1923

Waterfront station was built by the Canadian Pacific Railway (CPR) and opened on August 1, 1914. It was the Pacific terminus for CPR's transcontinental passenger trains to Montreal, Quebec, and Toronto, Ontario. The current station is the third CPR station. The previous CPR station was located one block west, at the foot of Granville and, unlike the current classical-styled Waterfront station, was built in "railway gothic" like CPR's many railway hotels.

During World War II, the station was used as a temporary hospital for wounded returning soldiers.

Waterfront station was targeted for conversion into a public intermodal transit facility in the mid-1970s. This effort was previously outlined in the Granville Waterfront Station Plan (GWS Plan), which also proposed the relocation of the termini of Canadian National Railway's Super Continental and Amtrak's Pacific International intercity train services from False Creek to Waterfront station, and the construction of an intercity bus terminal across the street to replace the terminal at Larwill Park. The conversion reached an important milestone in 1977, when the SeaBus began operating out of a purpose-built floating pier that was connected to the main terminal building via an overhead walkway above the CPR tracks.

After Via Rail took over the passenger operations of CPR and Canadian National Railway (CNR) in 1978, it initially continued using both railways' stations in Vancouver. However, on June 14, 1979, Via decided to consolidate its Vancouver operations at the Vancouver CNR station and to cease using the CPR station. The choice of CNR station was made due to the lower cost of modifications required for additional train service, greater room for expansion, and better access to maintenance facilities. Also, because only a small percentage of intercity train travellers used transit to reach their train departures, the superior local bus and ferry connections of the CPR station became less of a determining factor. The last scheduled Via passenger train to use Waterfront station departed on October 27, 1979.

CPR's passenger platform and some of its tracks were torn up in the early 1980s to make way for the guideway of the original SkyTrain line (Expo Line), which opened on December 11, 1985. During Expo 86, SkyTrain operated special shuttle trains between Waterfront station and Stadium–Chinatown station (then named Stadium station), connecting the Canadian Pavilion at Canada Place to the main Expo site along False Creek.

A private ferry company, Royal SeaLink Express, ran passenger ferries from a new dock on the west side of the SeaBus terminal to Victoria and Nanaimo in the early 1990s but ultimately folded. In 2003, HarbourLynx began operating out of Royal Sealink's old facility at the SeaBus terminal. In 2006, following major engine problems with their only vessel, they folded as well.

In 1995, platforms were built adjacent to the SkyTrain station for the West Coast Express, which uses the existing CPKC tracks. The platforms for the West Coast Express were built in the same location as the old CPR platforms.

In 2002, Millennium Line trains began to share tracks with the Expo Line at Waterfront station. The lines continued to share tracks until late 2016, when an Expo Line branch to Production Way–University station was created in replacement of the Millennium Line service between VCC–Clark and Waterfront stations.

In 2009, the Canada Line opened with separate platforms which are accessible via the main station building, but require leaving the fare-paid zone when transferring between other modes. Waterfront station serves as a common terminus point for both the Expo Line and the Canada Line.

Waterfront station was one of the first stations to receive TransLink's "T" signage, denoting a transit station. This signage was originally installed in the downtown core of Vancouver to help visitors during the 2010 Olympics.

In 2018, TransLink announced that Waterfront's Canada Line platforms, as well as two other stations on the line within downtown Vancouver, would receive an accessibility upgrade including additional escalators, as most Canada Line stations were built with only up-escalators initially. Construction began in early 2019 and was completed in December.

In 2020, TransLink started work on replacing the escalators connecting to the Expo Line. The first step in this project was to close access to the Expo Line from Cordova Street for three weeks in June. The closure forced passengers to access the Expo Line from the Howe Street entrance. Because the construction blocked access to the elevators to the Expo Line platforms, a temporary shuttle bus service between the SeaBus terminal, the main concourse area, and Burrard station was instated.

In 2022, TransLink relocated the in-person service centre at Stadium–Chinatown station and opened a new 580-square-metre (6,200 sq ft) customer service centre at Waterfront station on September 23.

== Architecture ==
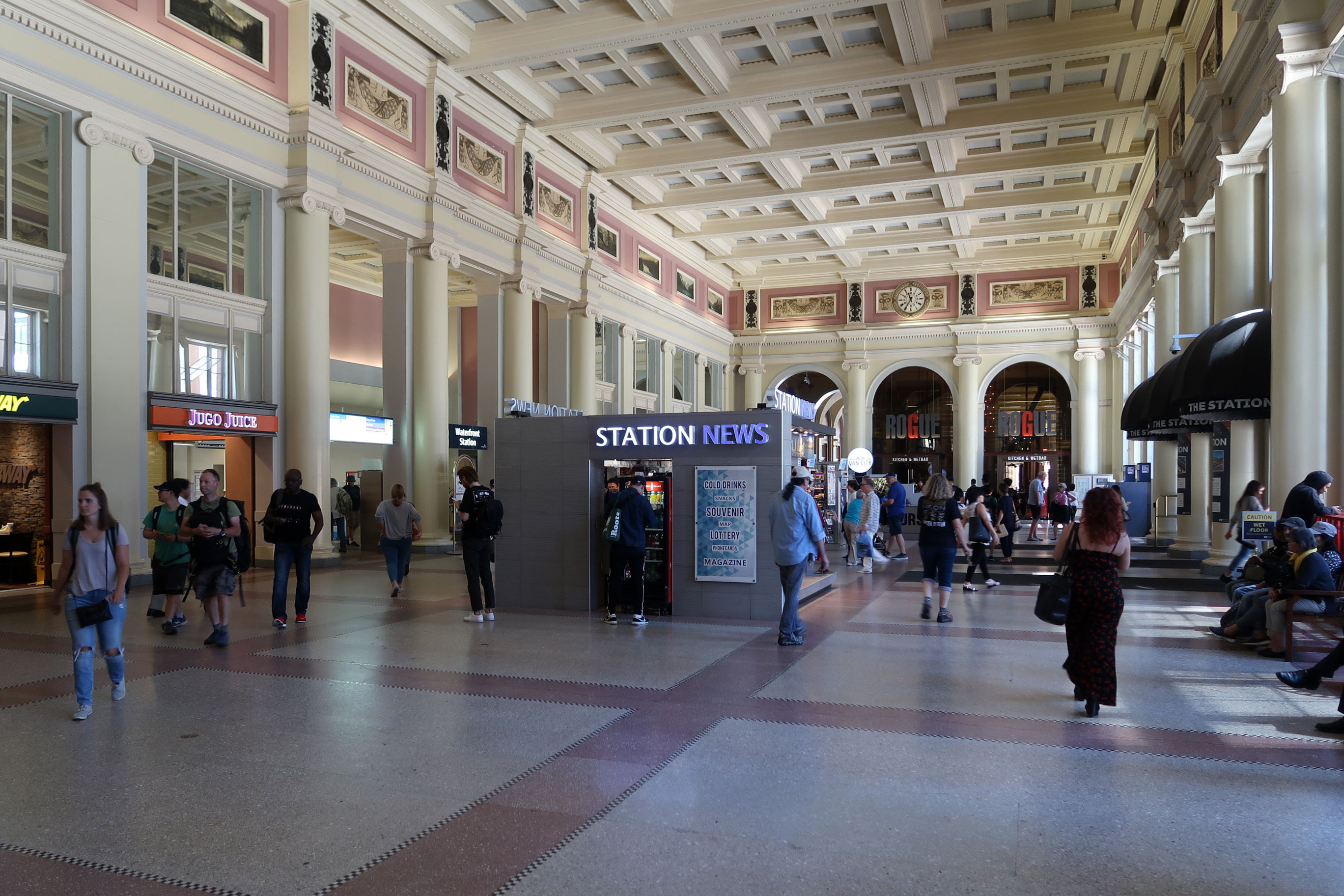
Waterfront's main concourse in 2018

Waterfront's main station building was designed in a neoclassical style, with a symmetrical red-brick facade dominated by a row of smooth, white Ionic order columns. The Ionic columns are repeated in the grand interior hall, flanking the perimeter of the space. The main hall features two large clocks facing each other high on the east and west walls. Paintings depicting various scenic Canadian landscapes, completed in 1916 by Adelaide Langford, line the walls above the columns. The Montreal architecture firm Barott, Blackader and Webster was responsible for designing the main station building.

The station building is owned by Cadillac Fairview and underwent renovations in 2015 to restore its brick facade.

== Services ==
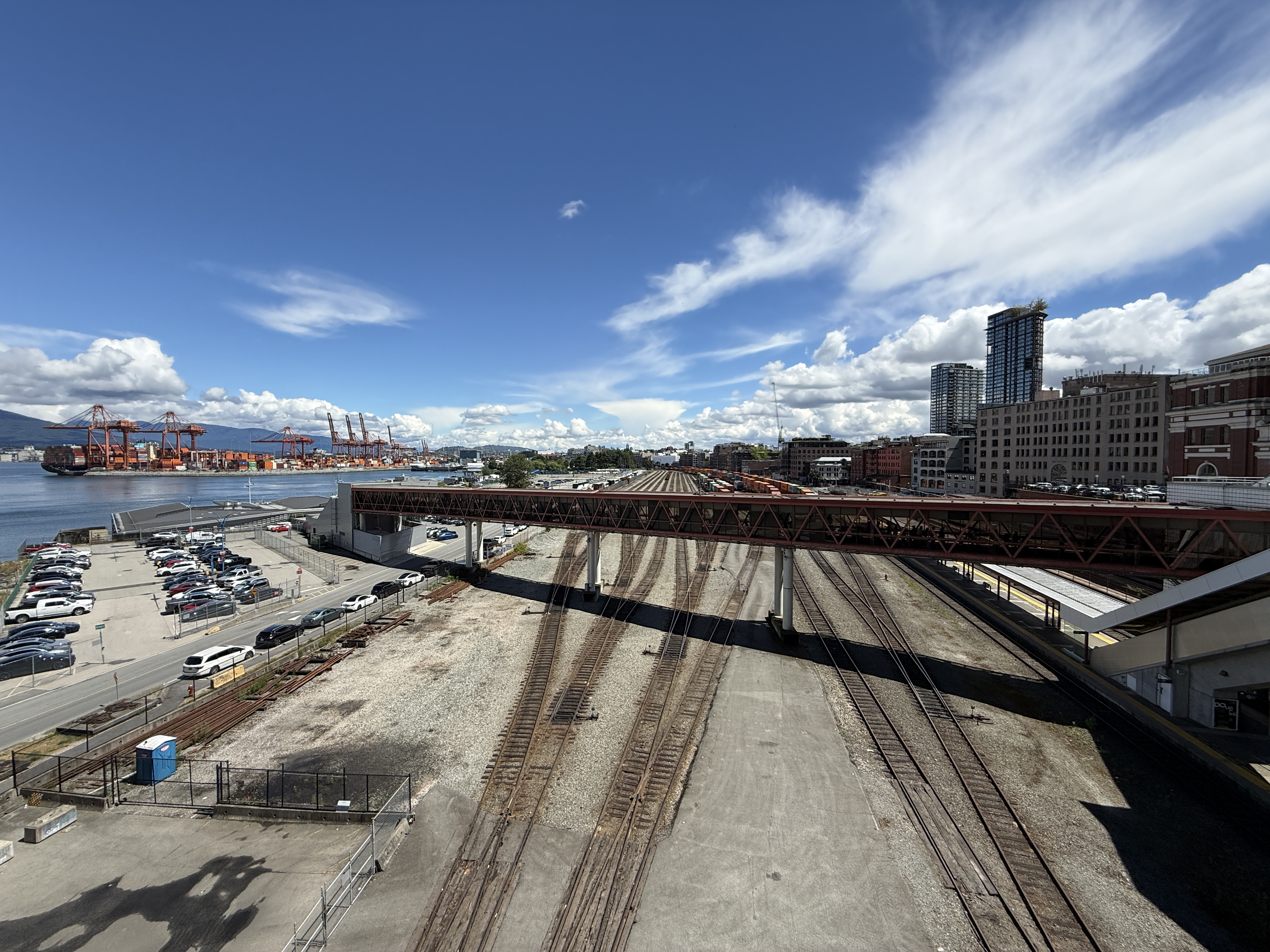
Waterfront station track and bridge to SeaBus

- SkyTrain Expo Line through Vancouver to northeast/south Burnaby, New Westminster and Surrey
- SkyTrain Canada Line, through Vancouver to central Richmond and Vancouver International Airport
- West Coast Express commuter rail Port Moody, Coquitlam, Port Coquitlam, Pitt Meadows, Maple Ridge, and Mission
- SeaBus passenger ferry to Lonsdale Quay in North Vancouver
- Various local, suburban, and express bus services provided by TransLink
- HeliJet's heliport is adjacent to the SeaBus concourse, therefore allowing passengers to connect to Waterfront station's main terminal building
- Vancouver Harbour Flight Centre float plane terminal is located approximately two blocks west of Canada Place

== Station information ==
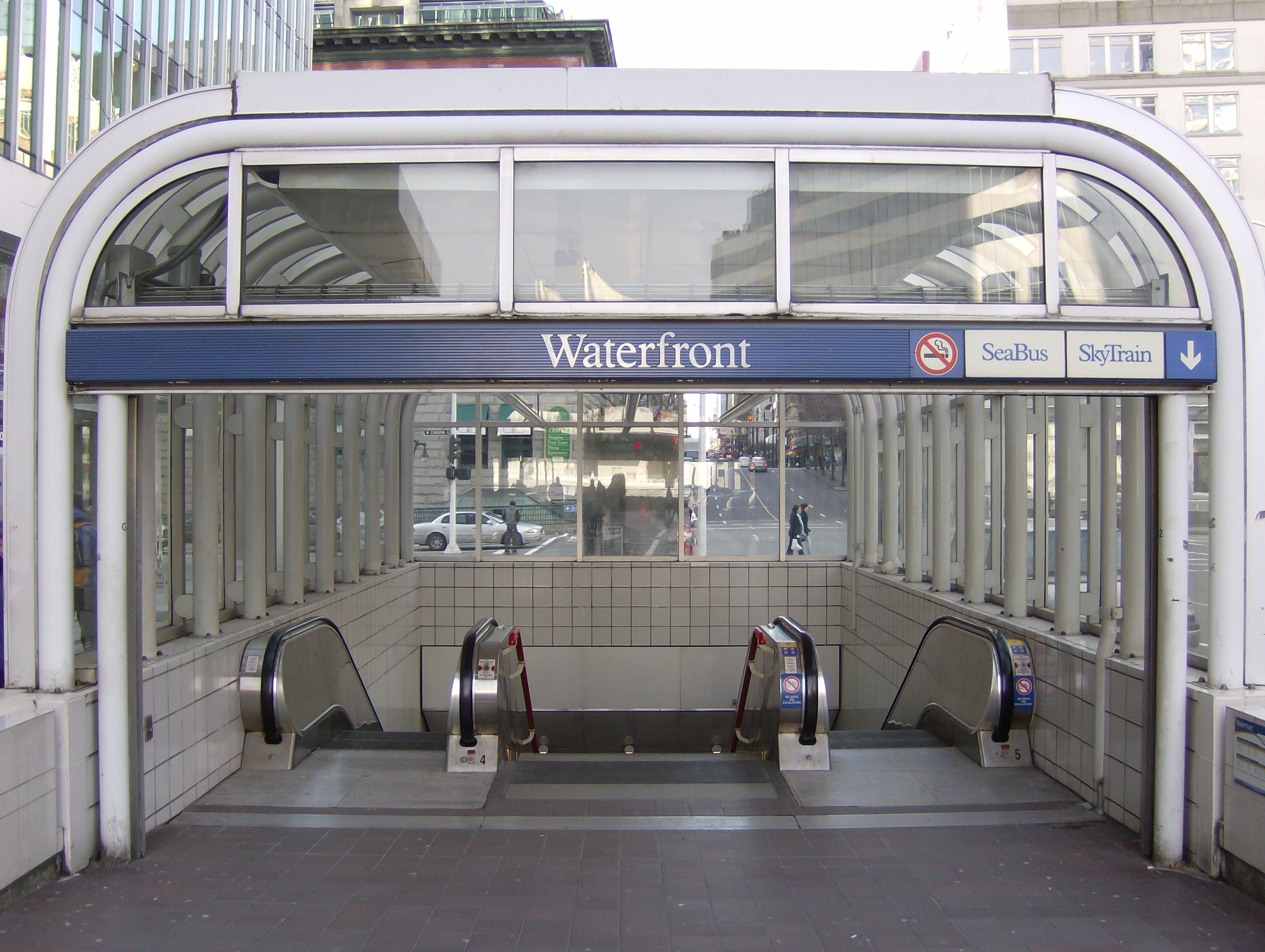
The Howe Street entrance to Waterfront station in 2006

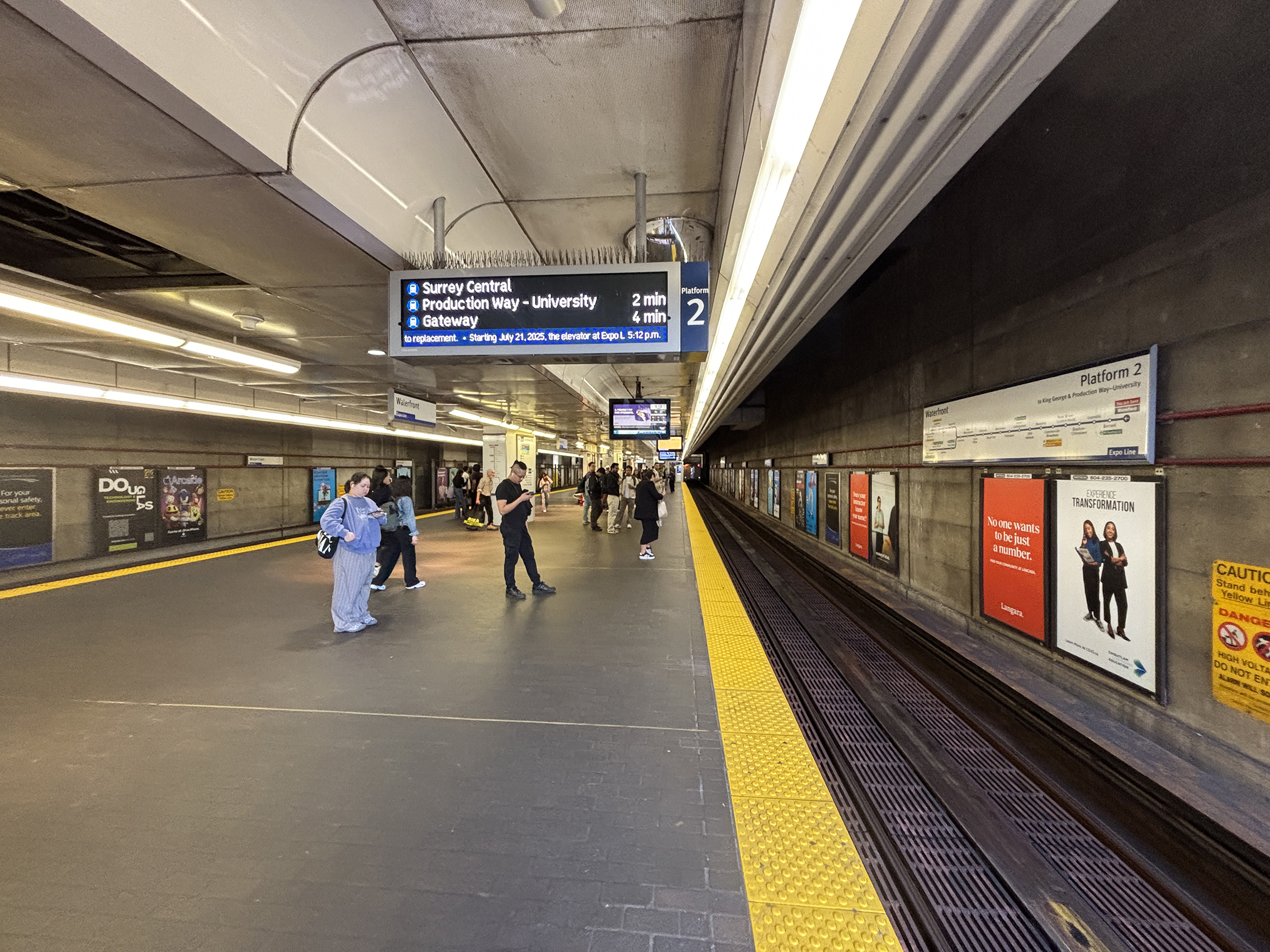
Expo Line platform (platforms 1 & 2) in 2025

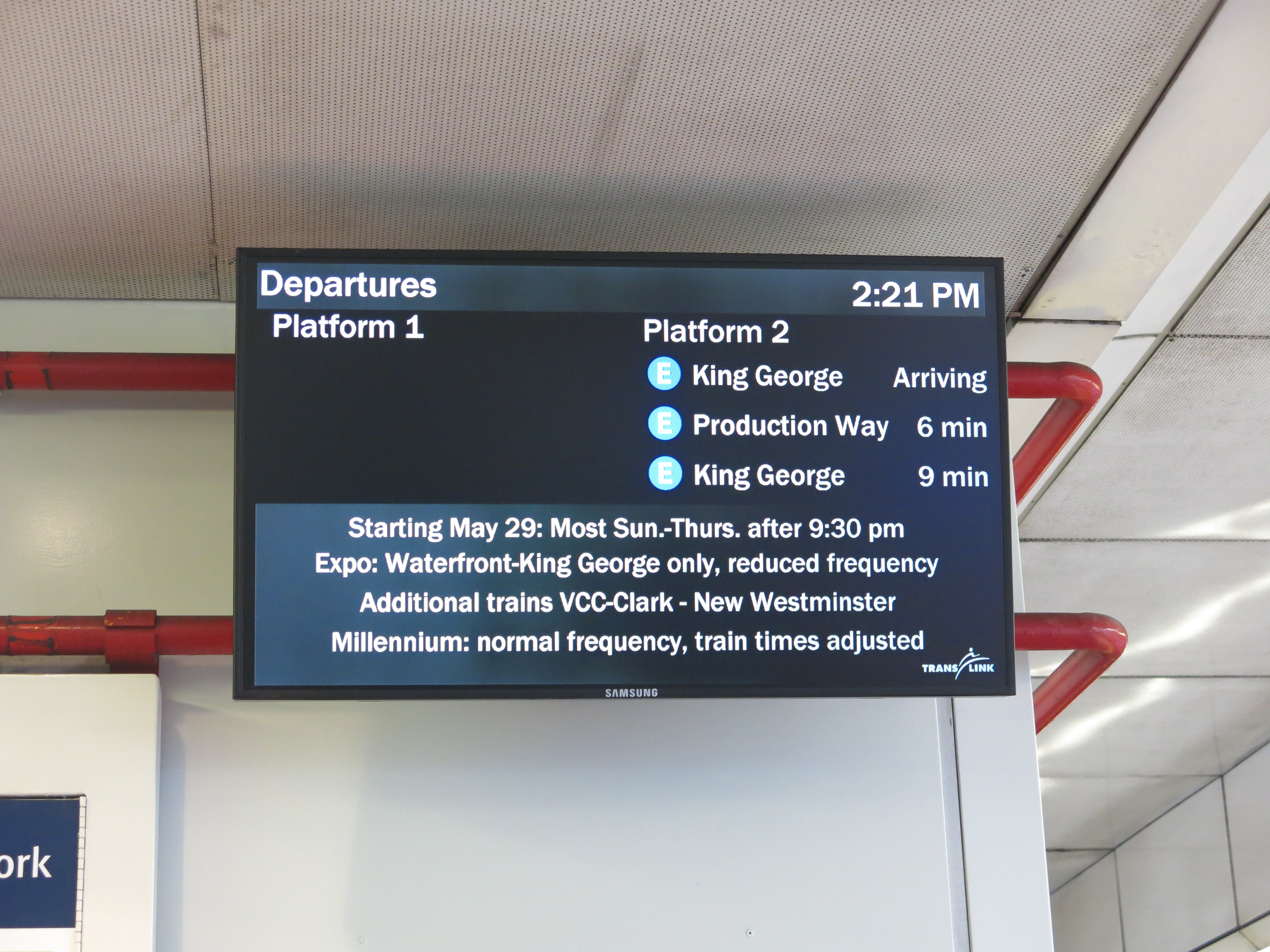
The digital "next arrival" sign at the Expo Line island platform (2017)

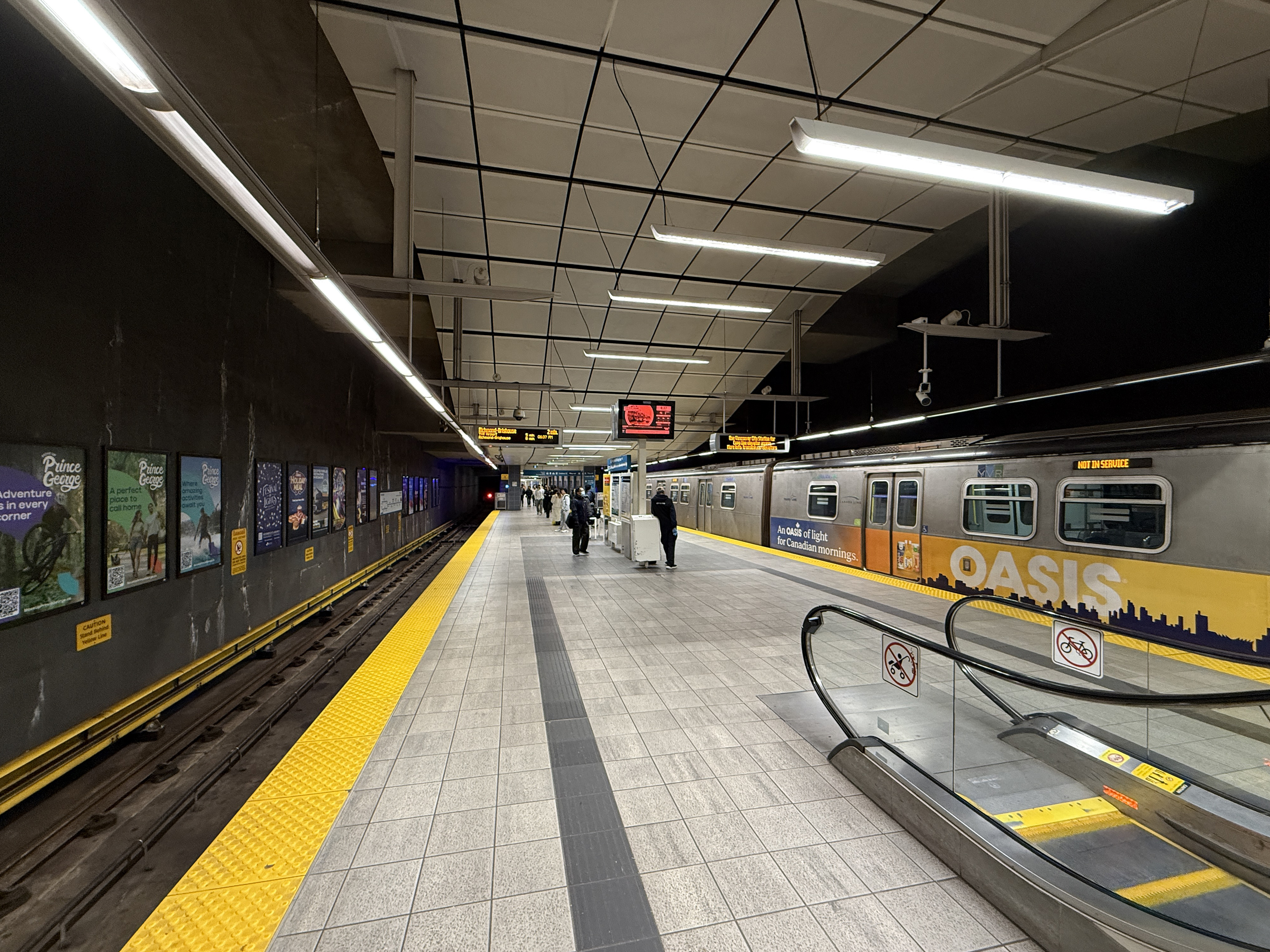
SkyTrain's Canada Line platform in 2025

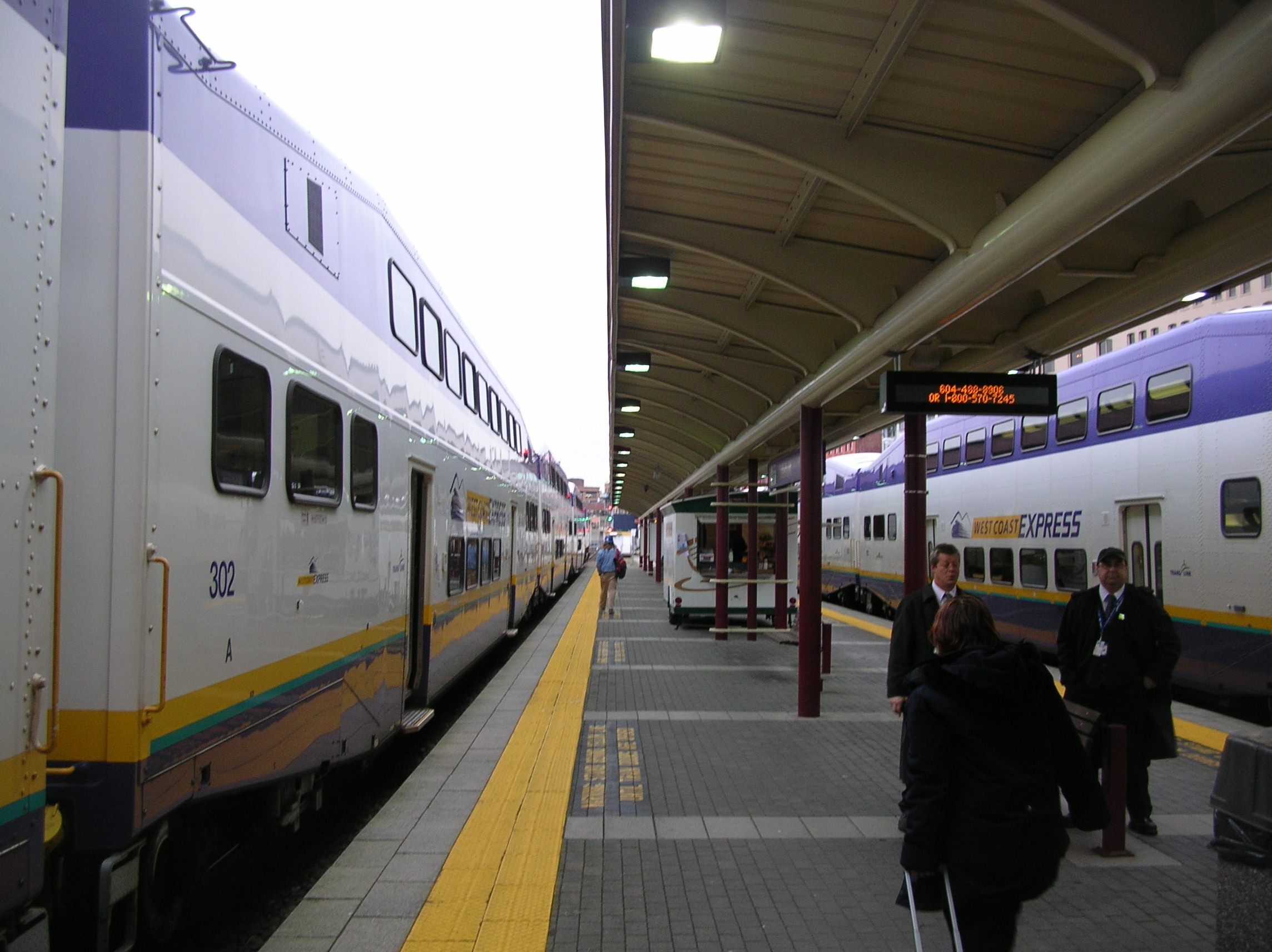
West Coast Express platform in 2010

=== Entrances ===
- Cordova Street entrance (terminal building): a fully accessible entrance connecting all services at Waterfront station. The entrance is at the east end of platforms 1 and 2 (Expo Line) and north end of platform 3 and 4 (Canada Line).
- Howe Street entrance: serves Canada Place, with underground connection to Sinclair Centre and Waterfront Centre at concourse level. No elevator is available at this entrance.
- Granville Street entrance: a new entrance opened 2009 in conjunction to the opening of the Canada Line. Located at the south end of platform 3 and 4 (Canada Line).

=== Transit connections ===
Bus services load on Cordova Street. Additional stops are on Hastings Street, adjacent to the Canada Line entrance near Granville Street for the R5 RapidBus service.

Bay	Location	Route	Notes
1	Cordova Street; Westbound	44 UBC	Express, weekday only. No evening service.
2	Cordova Street; Westbound	2 Macdonald	
3	Cordova Street; Westbound	50 False Creek South	
4	Cordova Street; Eastbound	3 Main	
4	Cordova Street; Eastbound	4 Powell	
4	Cordova Street; Eastbound	7 Nanaimo Station	
4	Cordova Street; Eastbound	8 Fraser	
4	Cordova Street; Eastbound	10 Downtown	
4	Cordova Street; Eastbound	50 Waterfront Station	
4	Cordova Street; Eastbound	N8 Fraser Nightbus	
	Hastings Street; Westbound	R5 Hastings Street to Burrard Station	RapidBus service
	Hastings Street; Eastbound	R5 Hastings Street to SFU	RapidBus service

== See also ==
- List of heritage buildings in Vancouver
- Pacific Central Station
- Pan Pacific Vancouver Hotel
- Fairmont Pacific Rim
- Rogers Tower
