= Marianne and Edward Gibson Art Museum =

- Established: 20 September 2025; 11 months ago
- Location: 8888 University Drive, Burnaby, British Columbia, Canada V5A 1S6
- Coordinates: 49.2786915°N 122.9134665°W
- Type: Art museum
- Director: Kimberly Phillips
- Curator: Sydney Laiss
- Public transit access: SFU Exchange
- Website: gibson.sfu.ca

The Marianne and Edward Gibson Art Museum (commonly referred to as the Gibson Art Museum or just The Gibson) is a public art museum located on the Burnaby campus of Simon Fraser University (SFU) in Burnaby, British Columbia, Canada. Opened in September 2025 to coincide with SFU's 60th anniversary, the 12,100-square-foot facility serves as the university's first purpose-built art museum, consolidating and expanding the activities of the former SFU Galleries.

The museum houses the SFU Art Collection, which includes over 5,900 modern and contemporary artworks, and functions as a "teaching museum" dedicated to interdisciplinary research, decolonial learning, and community engagement.

== History ==
The museum is named in honour of Marianne Gibson and her husband, Edward Gibson, a geographer and charter faculty member who joined SFU during its founding year in 1965. Gibson served as the Director of the SFU Gallery from 1986 to 1997, advocating for the role of visual arts in higher education.

Following a foundational gift from the Marianne and Edward Gibson Trust, plans for a dedicated museum building were unveiled to replace the fragmented exhibition spaces across campus. The project cost $26.3 million, funded through a combination of university resources and philanthropic donations, including contributions from the Djavad Mowafaghian Foundation, the Tuey Charitable Foundation, and an anonymous donor honouring former SFU President Andrew Petter.

Construction concluded in mid-2025, and the museum opened to the public on September 20, 2025.

== Architecture and sustainability ==
The building was designed by Toronto-based Hariri Pontarini Architects (led by Siamak Hariri) in collaboration with Vancouver's Iredale Architecture. The design won a Canadian Architect Award of Merit in 2023 prior to its construction.

Sited as part of the UniverCity East Gate development along the primary student thoroughfare, the single-story building has an open-concept layout with floor-to-ceiling glass windows designed to merge the indoor gallery spaces with the surrounding forested landscape of Burnaby Mountain. It features two entrances—one facing the main SFU Transit Exchange and the other facing the primary academic campus.

The structure incorporates British Columbia–sourced mass timber roof elements, allowing for long-span interior spaces. Built to meet sustainable construction standards, the facility is fully electric and holds a LEED Gold certification.

== Facilities and collection ==
The Gibson contains 1,115 square metres (12,100 sq ft) of interior space across four formal galleries, an art studio, a public forum, a salon, and an outdoor courtyard.

The museum is the permanent repository for the SFU Art Collection, comprising nearly 6,000 works of local, national, and international modern and contemporary art. Notable areas of the collection include:

- West Coast modernism: Extensive holdings of regional twentieth-century artists, including significant works by Jack Shadbolt and Joan Balzar.
- Indigenous art: A range of contemporary and traditional Indigenous art from the Pacific Northwest coast, including carvings and prints from the Bill Reid Collection and artists such as Jim Hart and John Marston.
- Contemporary prints and photography: Works spanning regional and international movements from the mid-twentieth century onward.

== Mandate and operations ==
Operating as a teaching museum, the Gibson supports hands-on academic inquiry, artist residencies, and public commissions. Its programming focuses on community-engaged initiatives and cross-disciplinary collaborations across SFU faculties.
