= Bentall Centre (Vancouver) =

Skyscraper complex in downtown Vancouver, British Columbia

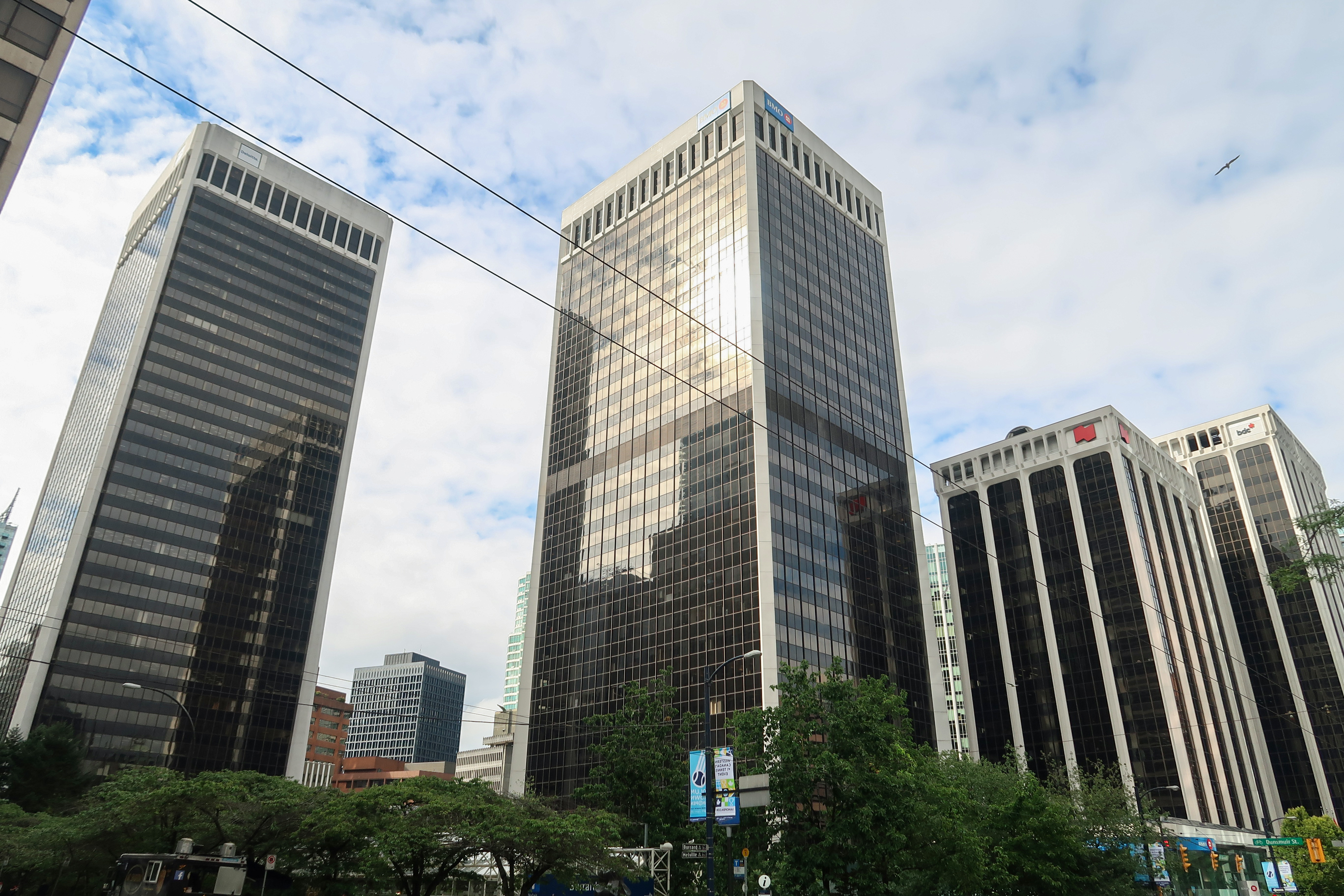
- Overview of Bentall 1, 2 and 3
- Interactive map of the Bentall Centre area

General information
- Coordinates: 49.2863°N 123.1199°W
- Opened: 1967
- Owner: Hudson Pacific Properties

Technical details
- Floor area: 140,000 square metres (1,500,000 sq ft)

Other information
- Public transit: Burrard station

Website
- www.bentallcentre.com

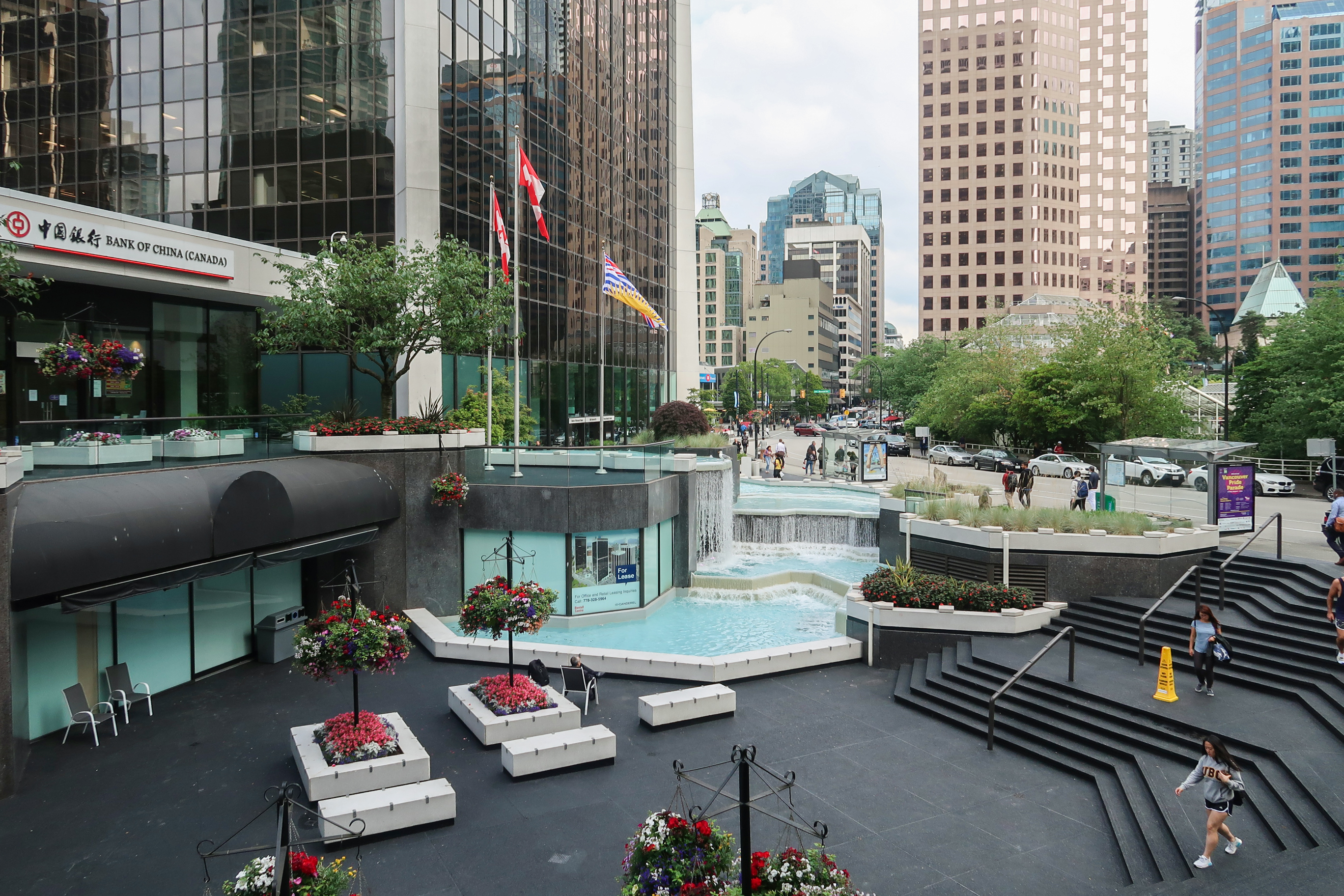
Sunken plaza

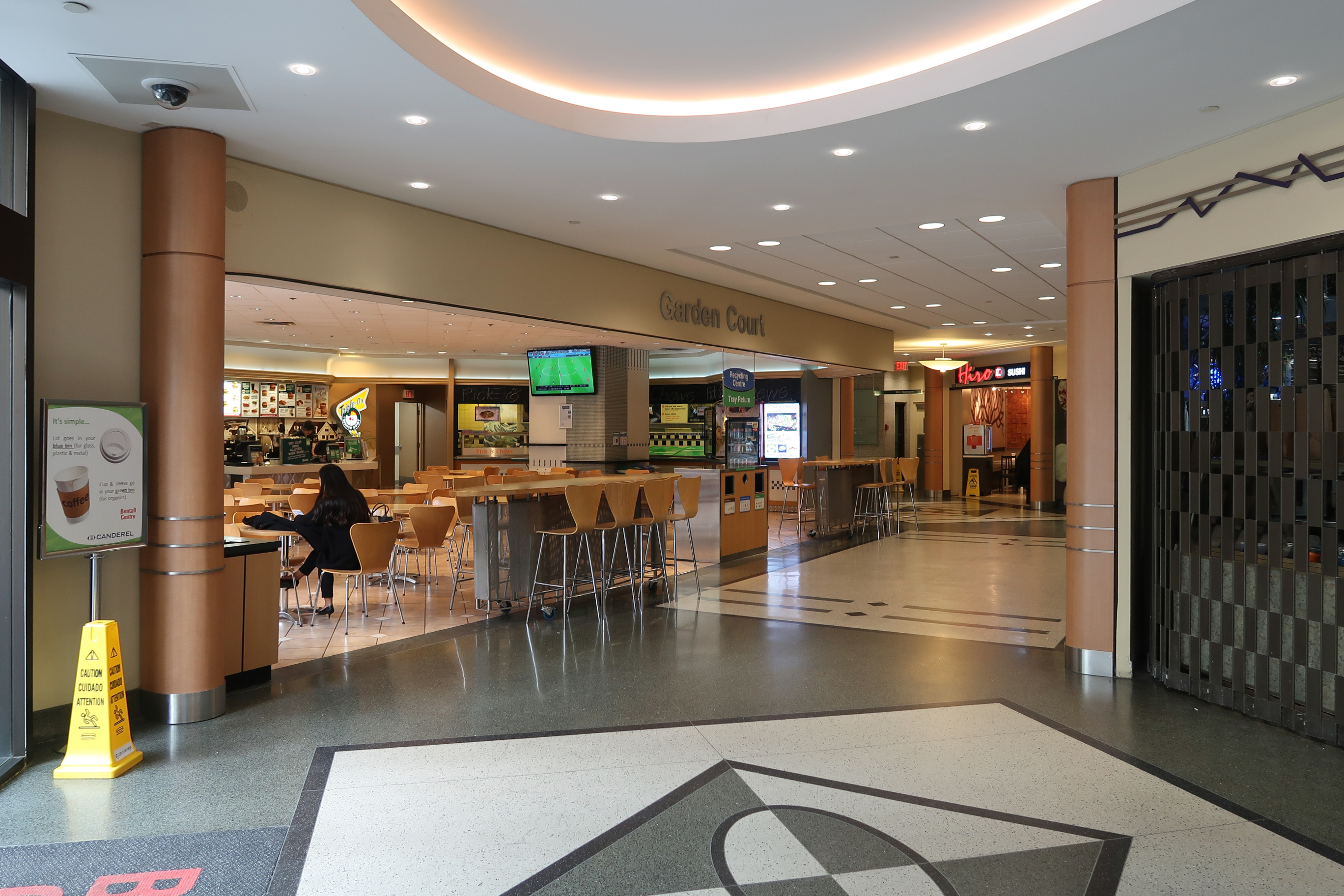
Garden court

The Bentall Centre is a 140,000-square-metre (1,500,000 sq ft) office complex and underground shopping mall, located in downtown Vancouver's financial district. It is owned and managed by Hudson Pacific Properties. The shopping mall under the complex is known as "the Shops at Bentall Centre" and includes approximately 50 stores and a food court. The mall has a direct connection to Burrard Station of the SkyTrain network.

== One Bentall Centre ==
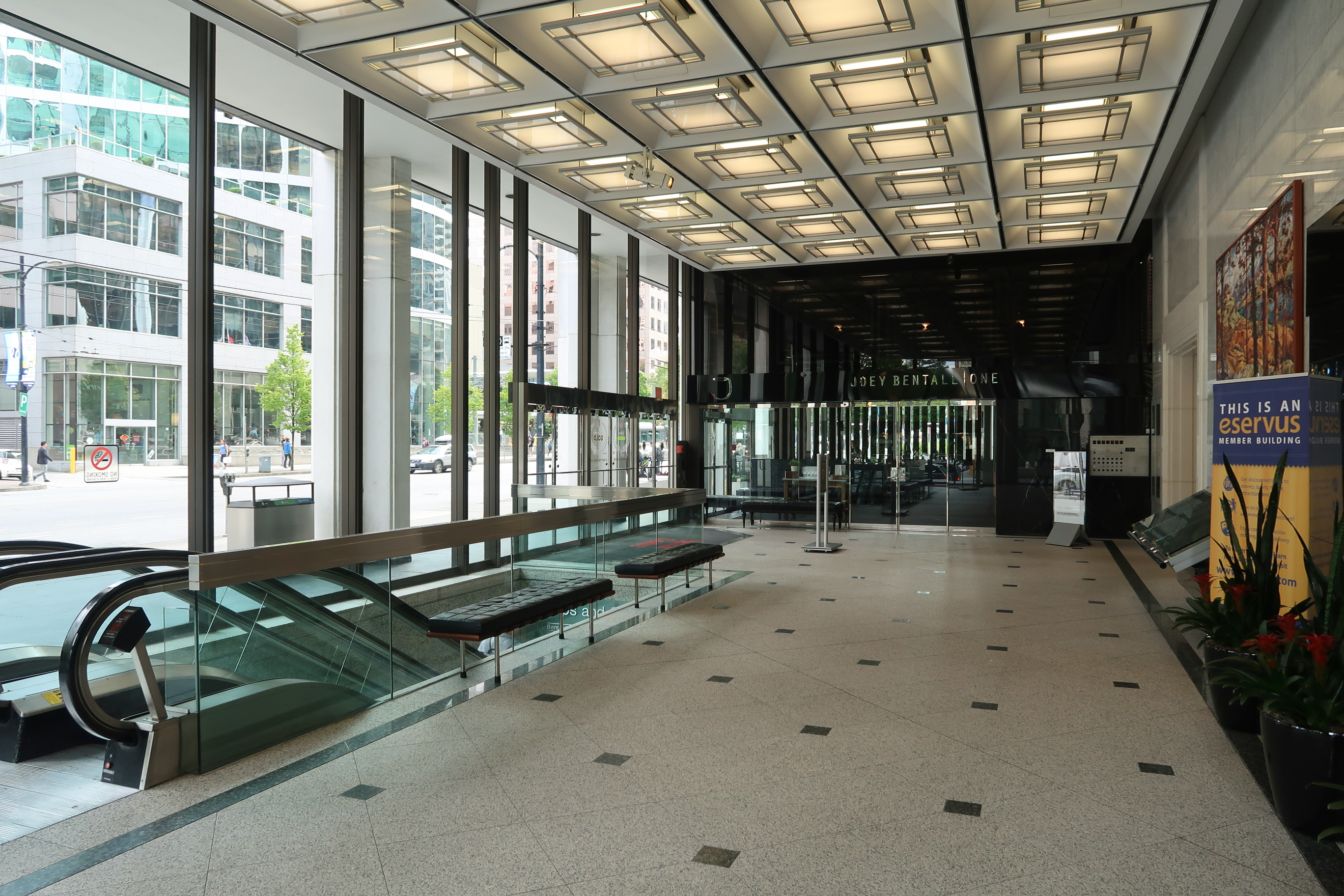
One Bentall Centre Lobby

One Bentall Centre is located at 505 Burrard Street. Completed in 1967, it stands at 86 m or 22 storeys tall.

== Two Bentall Centre ==
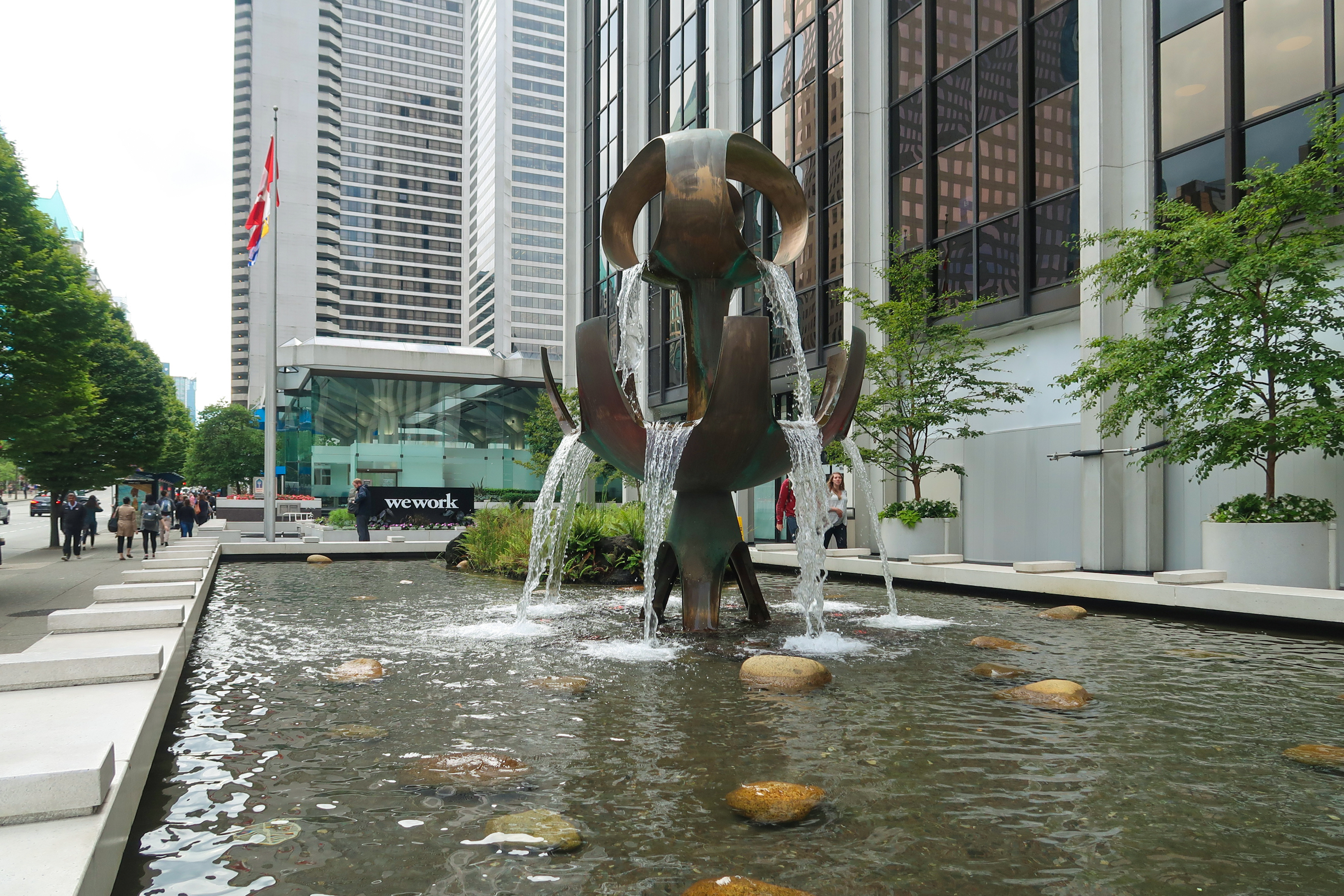
Two Bentall Centre Fountain

Two Bentall Centre is located at 555 Burrard Street. Completed in 1969, it stands at 76 m or 18 storeys tall. WeWork is the main tenant of this building.

== Three Bentall Centre ==
Three Bentall Centre is located at 595 Burrard Street. Completed in 1974, it stands at 122 metres (400 ft) and has 32 storeys. Bank of Montreal is the main tenant of this building.

== Four Bentall Centre ==
Four Bentall Centre is an office tower located at 1055 Dunsmuir Street in downtown Vancouver, British Columbia. Completed in 1981, the building stands 138 metres (453 ft) tall and has 35 storeys. It is part of the Bentall Centre office complex and is currently the 13th tallest building in the city. The tower primarily contains office space and is connected to the surrounding downtown core through pedestrian walkways and nearby transit access.

== Five Bentall Centre ==
Bentall 5 or Five Bentall Centre is a 35-floor skyscraper located at 550 Burrard Street in Downtown Vancouver, British Columbia, Canada. it stands at 140 m (459 ft), making it the 15th-tallest building in the city. The building was constructed in two phases, with the first 22 floors completed by the end of 2002 and the 23rd to 35th floors completed in late 2007.

== Gallery ==
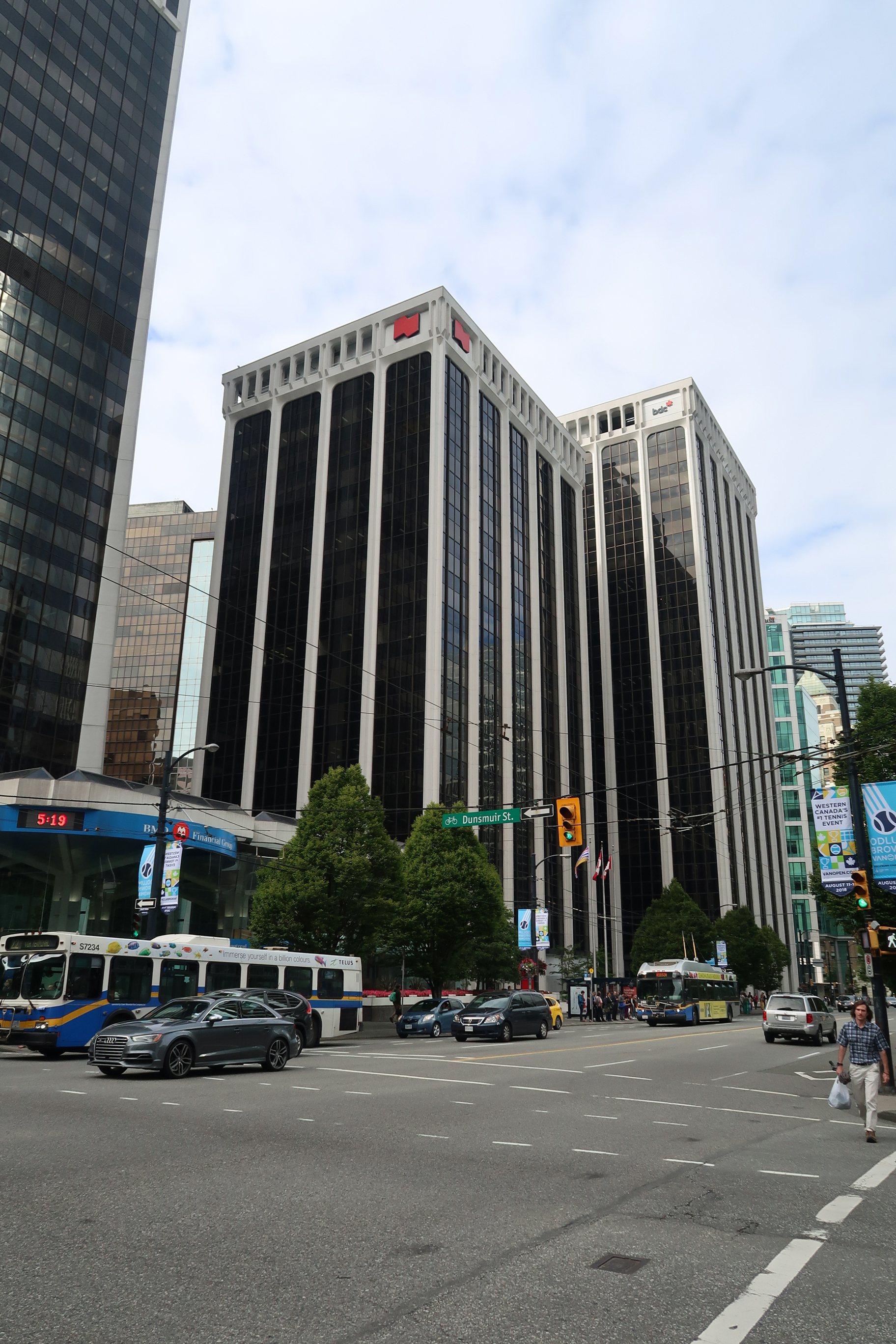
Two Bentall Centre (front) and One Bentall Centre (back)

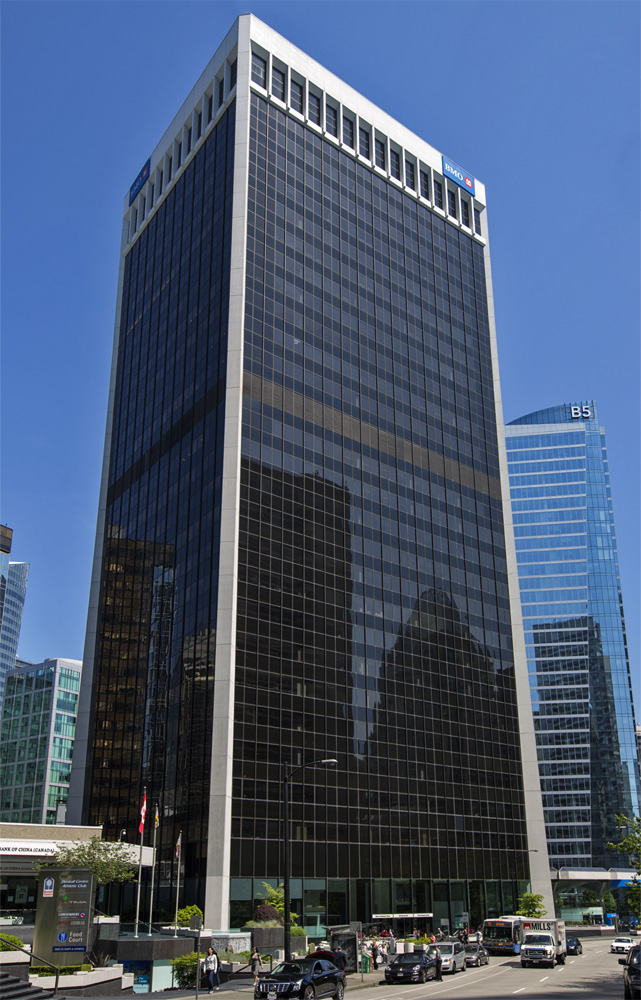
Three Bentall Centre in 2015

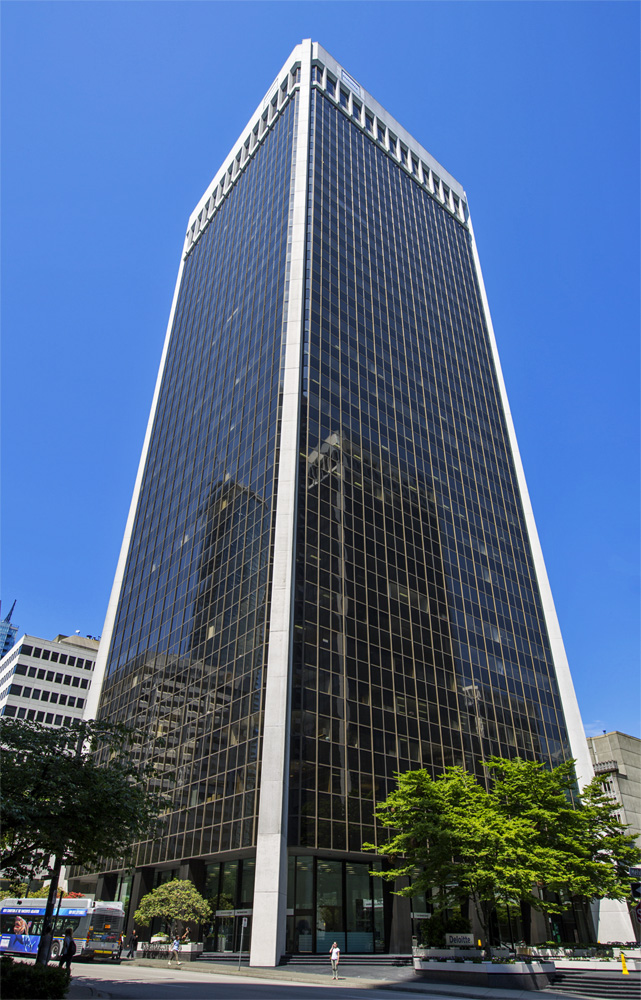
Four Bentall Centre in 2015

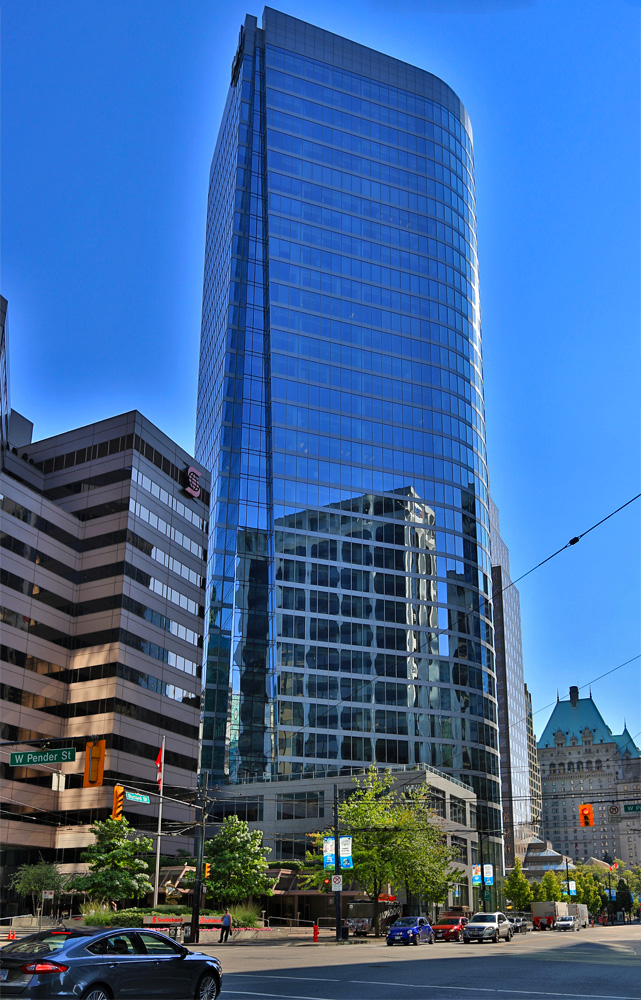
Bentall 5

== Accidents ==
On January 7, 1981, four carpenters – Donald Davis, Gunther Couvreux, Brian Stevenson and Yrjo Mitrunen – were killed while constructing Bentall Four. They were preparing a platform known as a "fly form" (see formwork) for the last concrete pour on the roof, when it broke free. Without warning the fly form, known as "fly form E", fell over the edge, carrying four men to their deaths.

On February 23, 1981, a coroner's inquest was held in Vancouver. It would be referred to as a marathon inquest, since it went into the eighth day with 30 witnesses being called upon to testify. Anthes Equipment Ltd was the company that designed and supplied the fly forms to the contractor building the tower. Anthes Equipment Ltd of Toronto was not registered to be working in BC at the time of the accident; leaving them liable to civil action. The equipment they supplied was also non-compliant with the specifications required in BC at the time.

One of the widows; Carol Davis, individually filed a writ on February 19, 1982, in the Supreme Court in an unprecedented action against Anthes Equipment Ltd. The other families elected to allow the Workers Compensation Board to sue on their behalf. On February 23, 1984; the fourth day into the trial, Carol Davis accepted an out-of-court settlement from Anthes Equipment Ltd.

== See also ==
- List of tallest buildings in Vancouver
