= Pan Pacific Vancouver Hotel =

Hotel in Vancouver, Canada

Coordinates: 49.28791°N 123.11313°W

Pan Pacific Vancouver Hotel is a hotel in Canada Place near Waterfront Station in Vancouver, British Columbia, Canada. It opened on January 8, 1986, to handle the influx of tourists brought to Vancouver by Expo 86.

== Heritage Horns ==
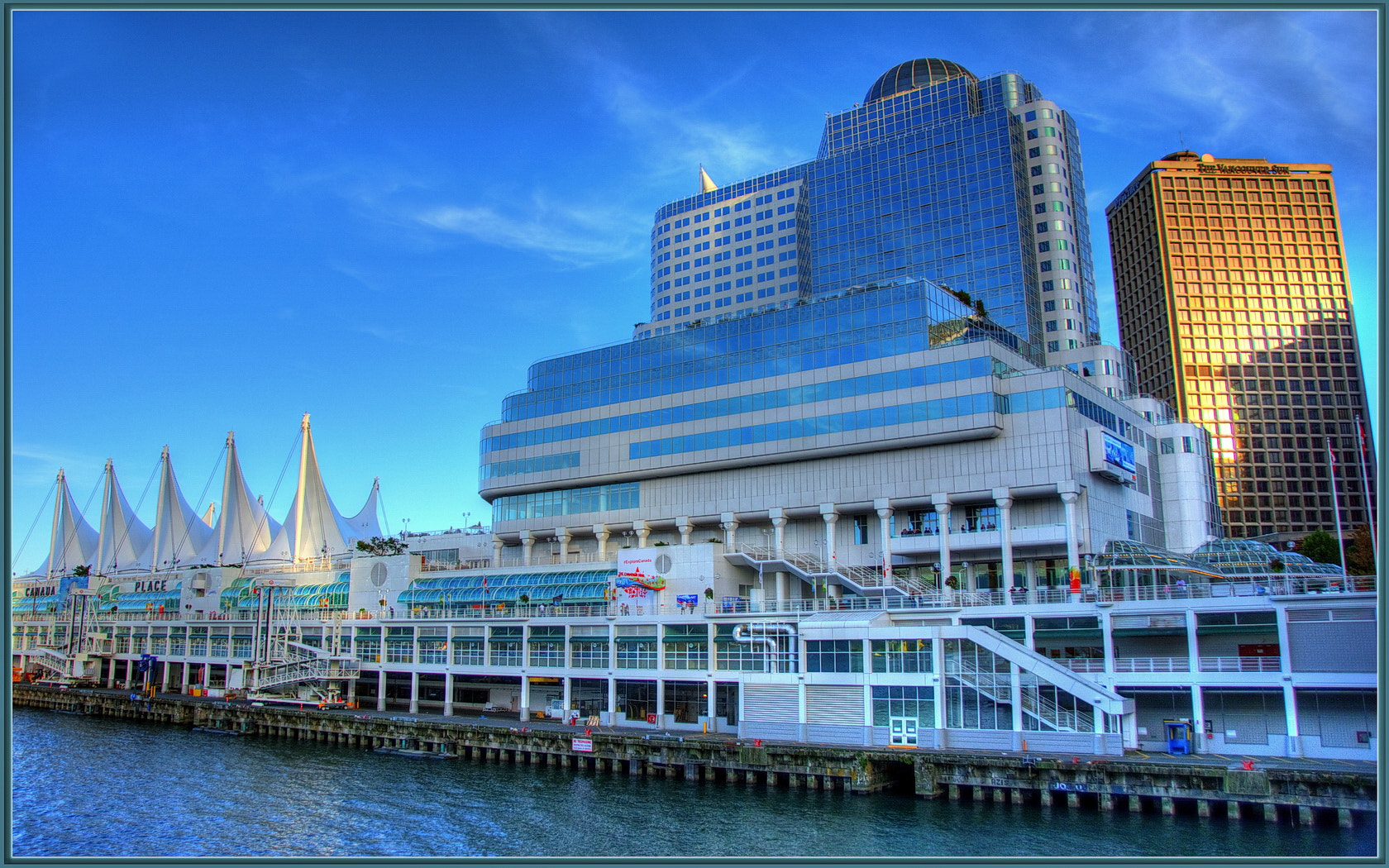
Pan Pacific Vancouver Hotel, located atop Canada Place.

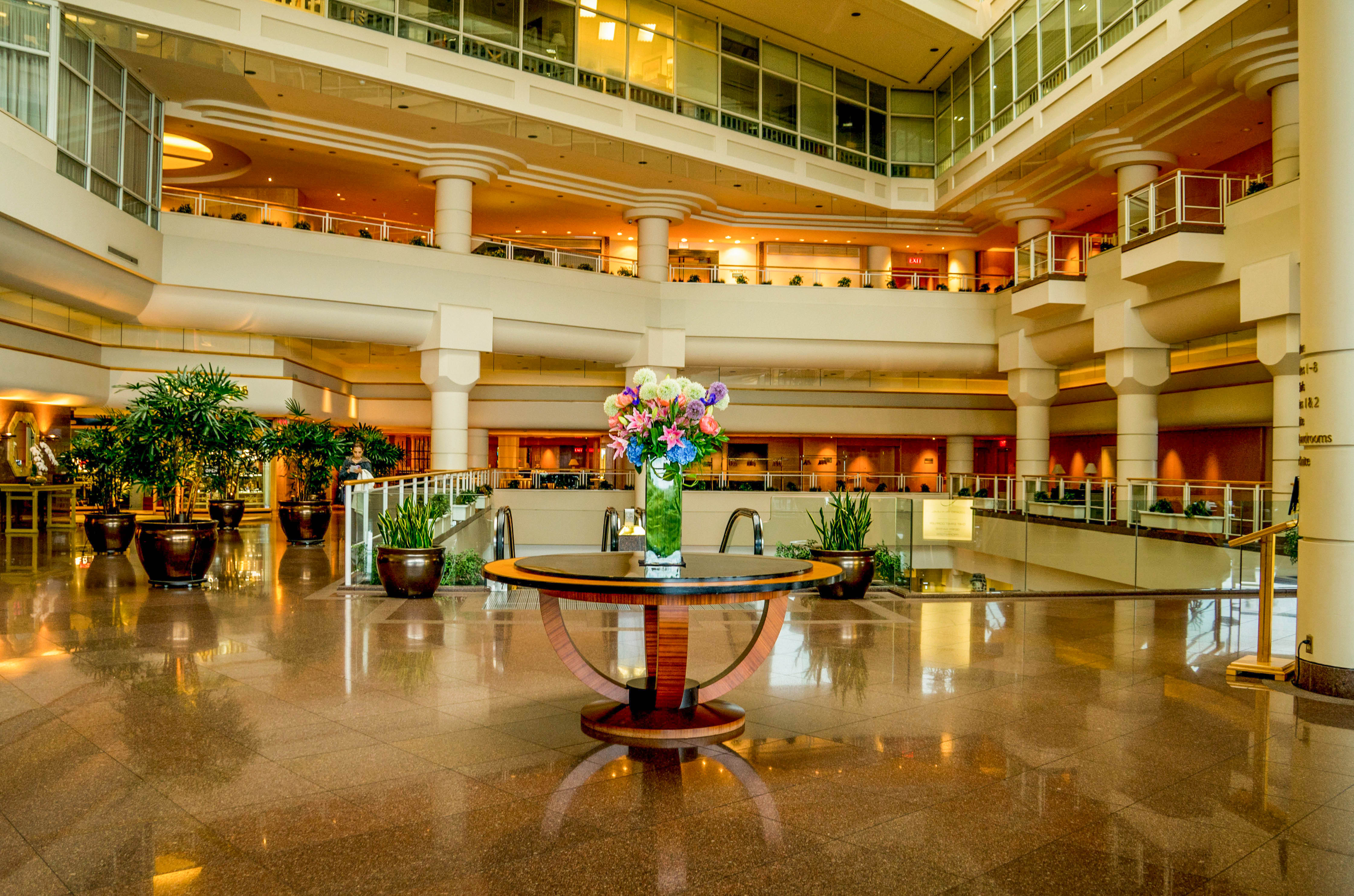
Pan Pacific Vancouver lobby

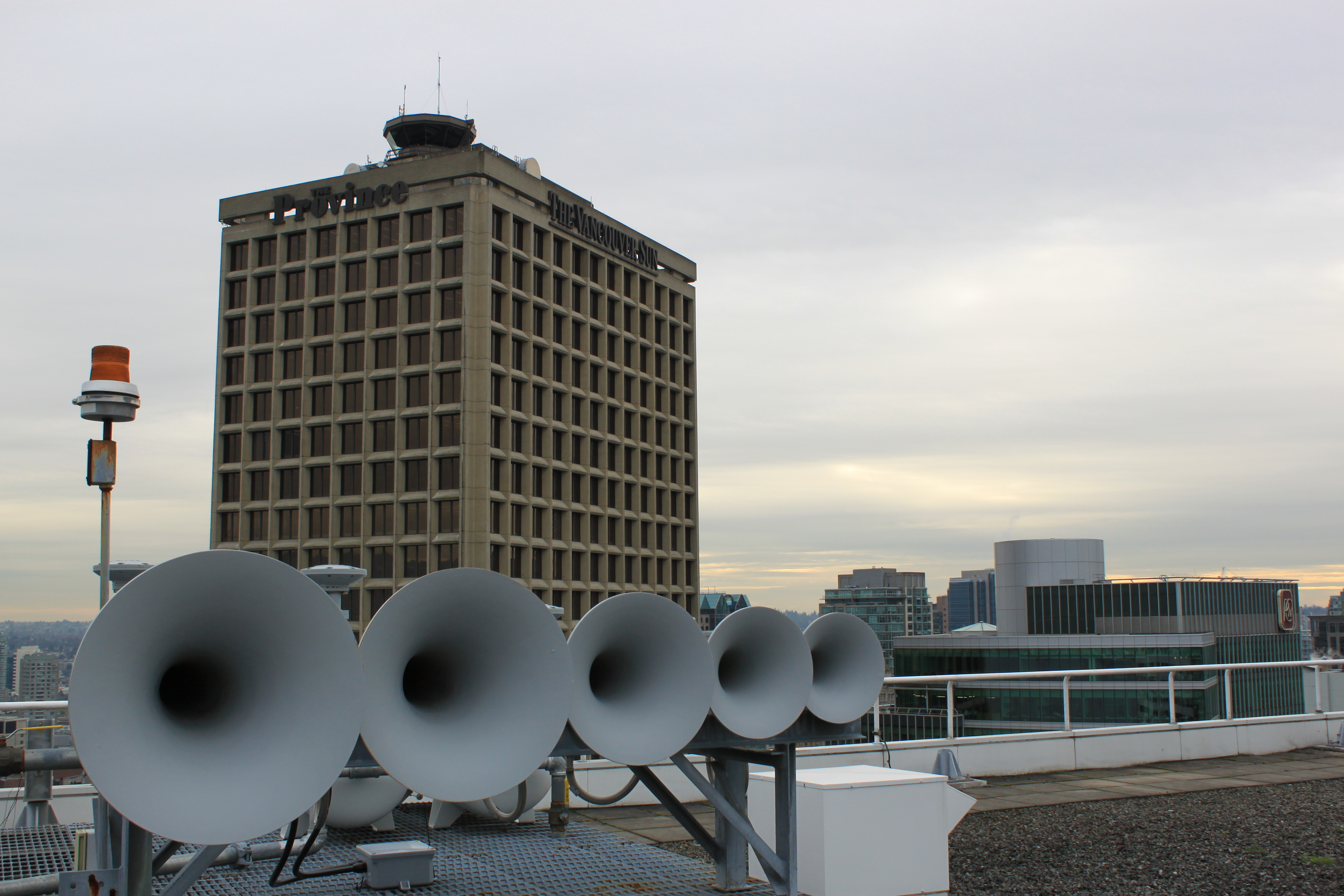
The North five of the ten Heritage Horns.

Touch play to hear horns

The ten Heritage Horns have five facing north and five facing east on the roof of the Pan Pacific hotel. They sound the first four notes of "O Canada" every day at noon and at 115 decibels they can be heard for miles. They were the brainchild of Les Southwell then designed and constructed by Robert Swanson for the Canadian Centennial in 1967 and funded by BC Hydro. They were originally on the BC Hydro building and were silent when the headquarters moved in the early 1990s. The horns started sounding again on November 8, 1994, after being acquired and refurbished by Canada Place. Due to complaints the timer was changed from mechanical to electrical soon after to make them accurate. They sounded 26 times during the 2010 Olympics, once for each medal won by Canada. The first was at 7:30 pm on February 13 for a silver won by Jennifer Heil. Another notable time signal in the area is the 9 O'Clock Gun across the harbour in Stanley Park.
