= Burrard station =

Metro Vancouver SkyTrain station

Burrard
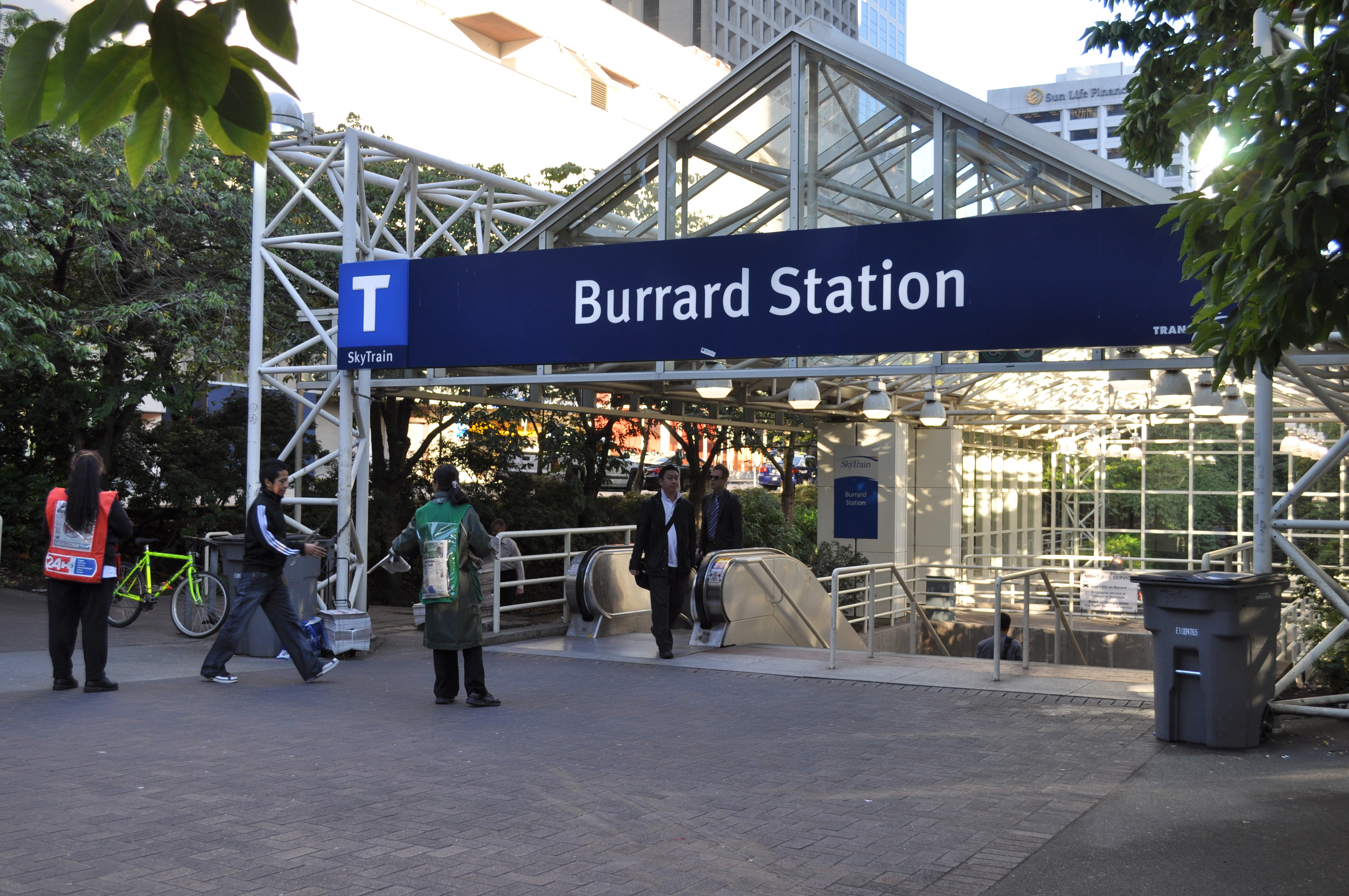
- Street level entrance on Burrard Street

General information
- Location: 635 Burrard Street, Vancouver
- Coordinates: 49.285616°N 123.120157°W
- System: SkyTrain station
- Owner: TransLink
- Platforms: Split platforms
- Tracks: 2
- Connections: R5 Hastings St

Construction
- Structure type: Subway
- Platform levels: 2
- Accessible: yes
- Architect: Architektengruppe U-Bahn

Other information
- Station code: BU
- Fare zone: 1

History
- Opened: December 11, 1985; 40 years ago

Passengers
- 2025: 6,072,000 ▲1.1%
- Rank: 4 of 54

Services
Preceding station	TransLink	Following station
Waterfront Terminus	Expo Line	Granville towards King George or Production Way–University
Location

Burrard is an underground station on the Expo Line of Metro Vancouver's SkyTrain rapid transit system. The station is located in Downtown Vancouver on Burrard Street, where Melville and Dunsmuir Streets meet, and is the western terminus of the R5 Hastings St that provides service to Simon Fraser University.

The station serves Vancouver's financial district and is within walking distance of the Coal Harbour and West End neighbourhoods. The station is accessible via the surface from Art Phillips Park or via the underground shopping centres of the Royal Centre and Bentall Centre skyscraper complexes.

== History ==
Burrard station opened in 1985 and is named for nearby Burrard Street, which in turn is named for Sir Harry Burrard-Neale. Prior to the opening of the Canada Line in 2009, Burrard station was the northern terminus of the 98 B-Line and was served by a number of bus routes that provided service to Vancouver's southern suburbs of Delta, Richmond, Surrey, and White Rock. In 2016, bus service to the eastern suburbs of the Tri-Cities was discontinued when the Millennium Line's Evergreen Extension opened.

In May 2018, preliminary plans were revealed to renovate and expand Burrard station. On July 13, 2021, TransLink announced that it would close the station for two years beginning in early 2022 to allow construction for the rebuild. On March 25, 2022, these plans were abandoned due to rising construction costs.

== Structure and design ==
The structure housing the surface station entrance was designed to resemble Victorian-era British railway stations, with a peaked glass roof. The station was designed by the Austrian architecture firm Architektengruppe U-Bahn.

When originally opened, the station's only underground passage was to the Bentall Centre skyscraper complex. A connection to the Royal Centre complex was constructed some years later, while an anticipated underground passage to the Park Place skyscraper across the street was never built. The construction of a new east entrance to the station, at the southeast corner of the intersection of Burrard and Dunsmuir, was considered as part of upgrades to the station included in TransLink's 10-Year Vision, but the cost of such an addition was higher than expected and TransLink turned to reviewing options to improve the existing entrance.

Like Granville, the station was built inside the Dunsmuir Tunnel and has a distinctive platform design. The inbound track (to Waterfront) is stacked vertically on top of the outbound track (to King George and Production Way–University), with both platforms within the historical single-track tunnel's footprint.

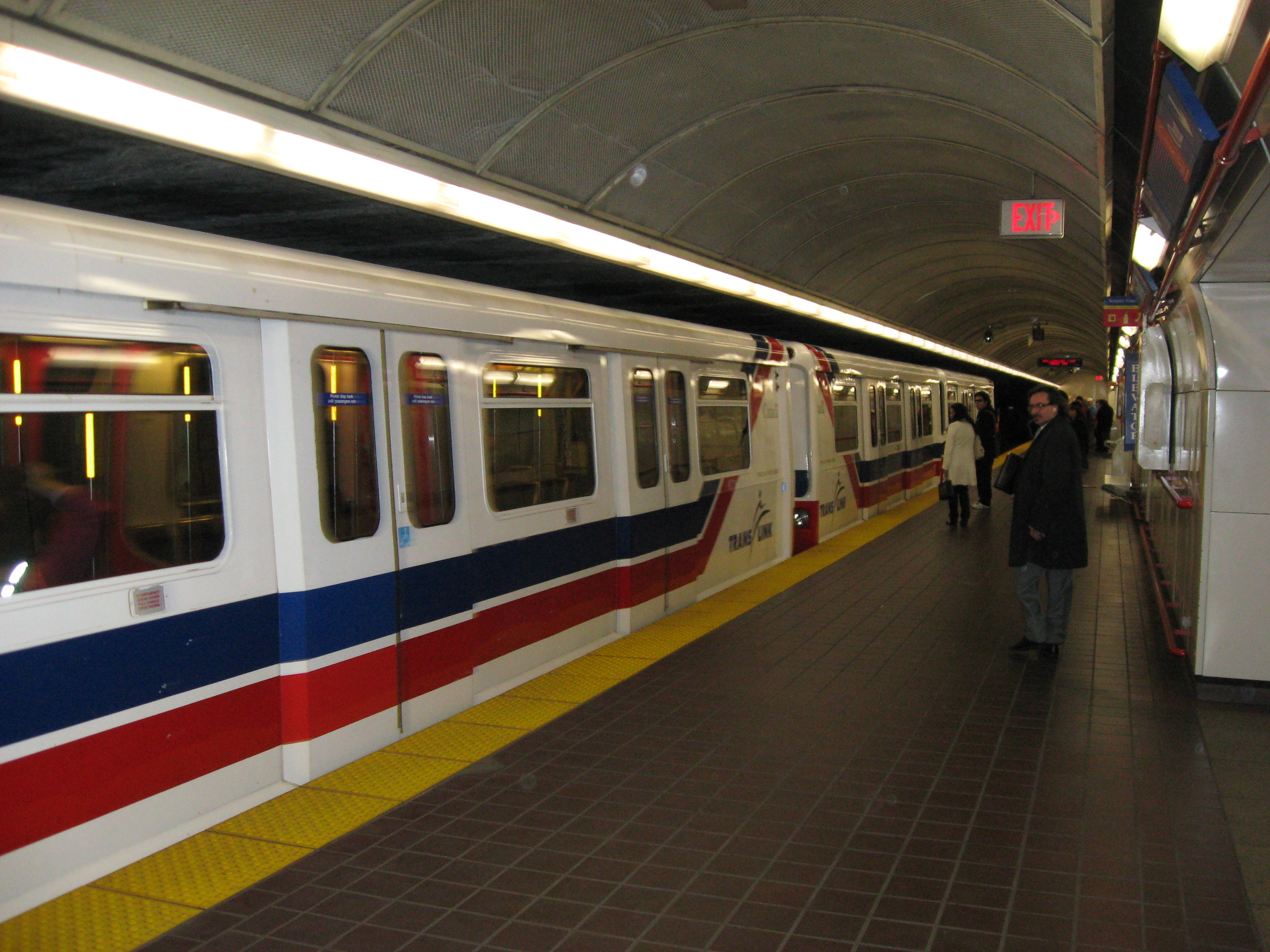
A train arriving at Burrard's outbound platform in 2008

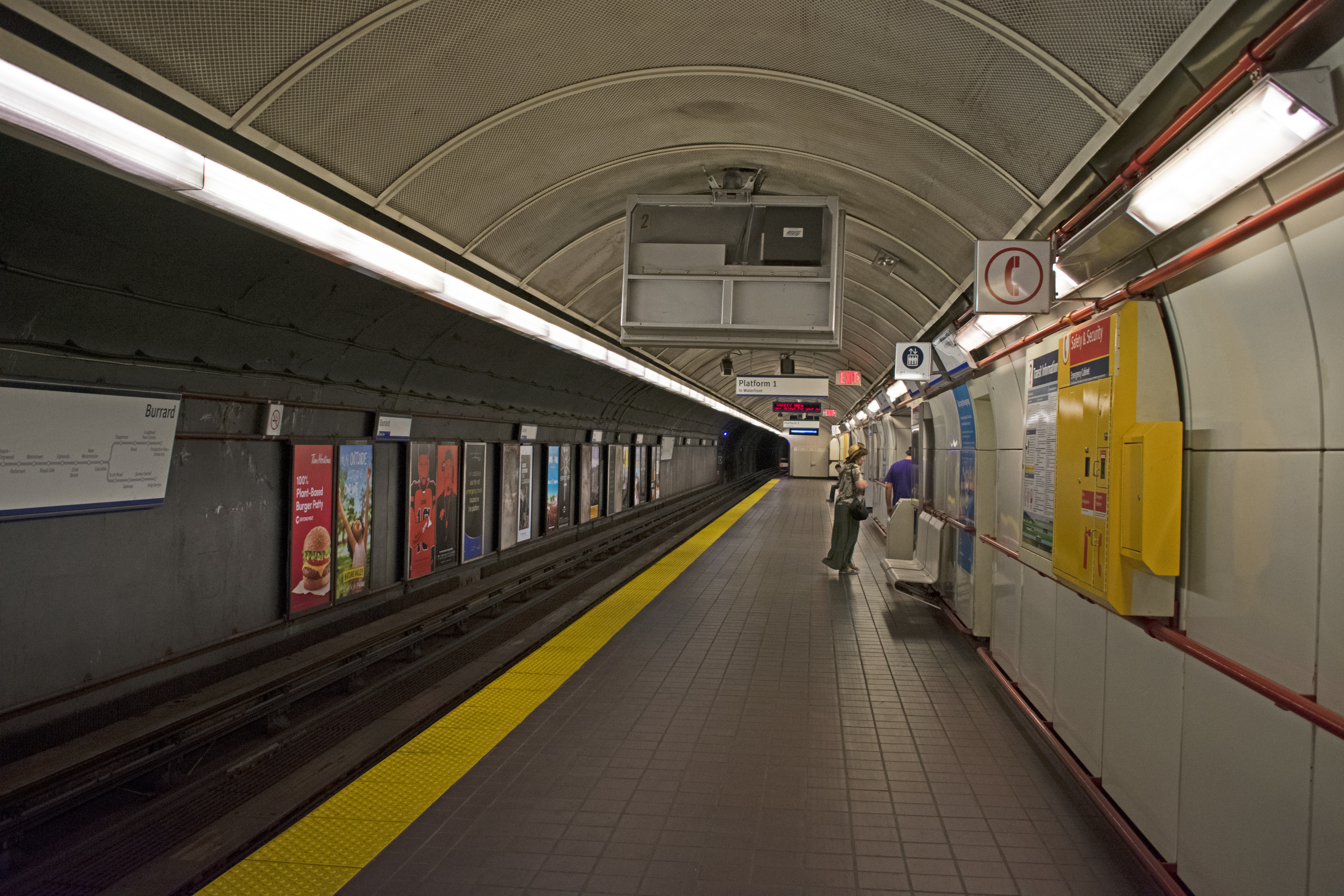
Platform 1, inbound to Waterfront station, in 2019

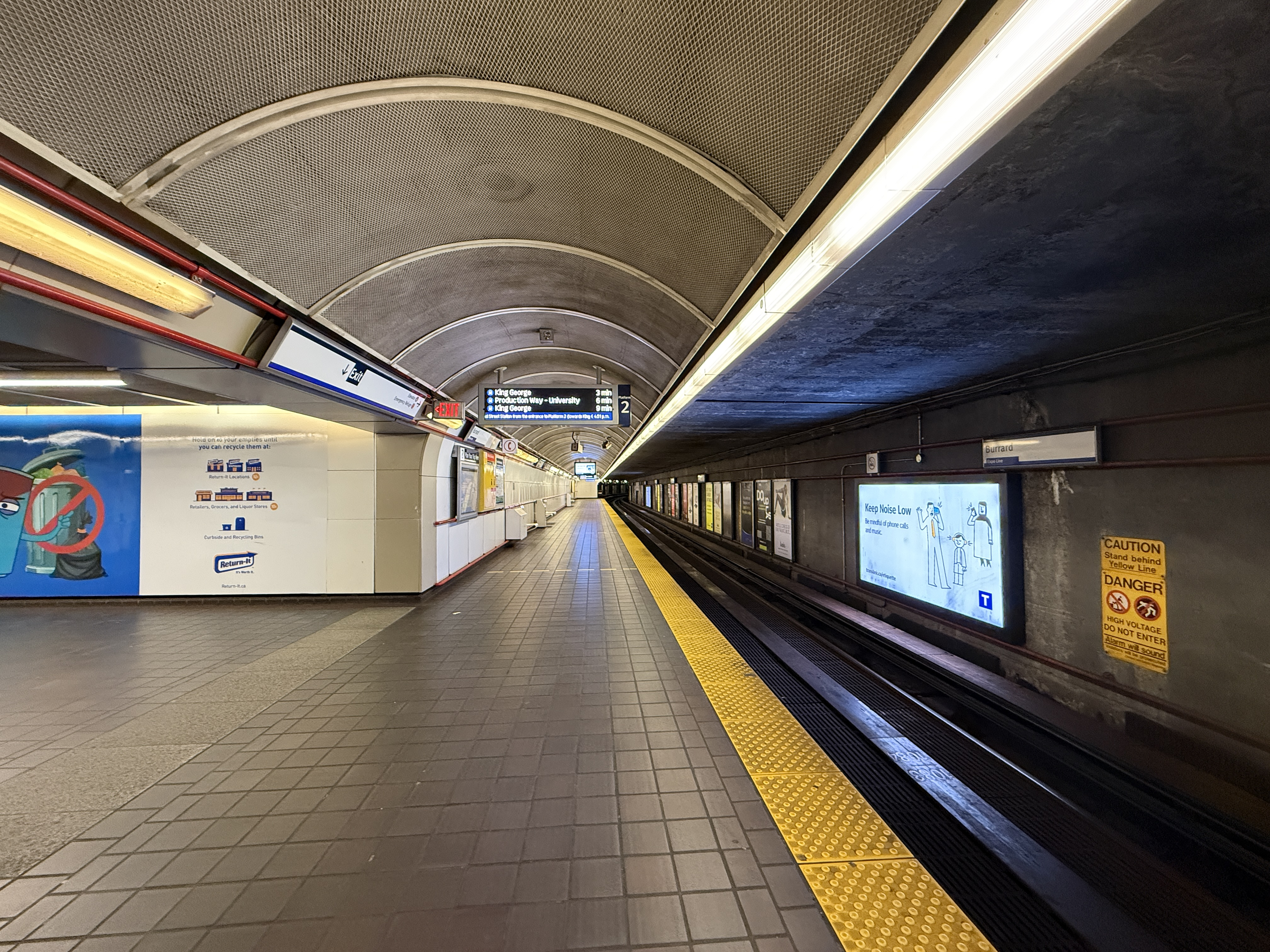
Platform 2 in 2026

== Services ==
Burrard station is one of four SkyTrain stations on the Expo Line that serve Downtown Vancouver. It has connections with many TransLink bus routes in Metro Vancouver; these buses serve the city of Vancouver, Burnaby, the city and district of North Vancouver, and West Vancouver.

== Station information ==
=== Entrances ===
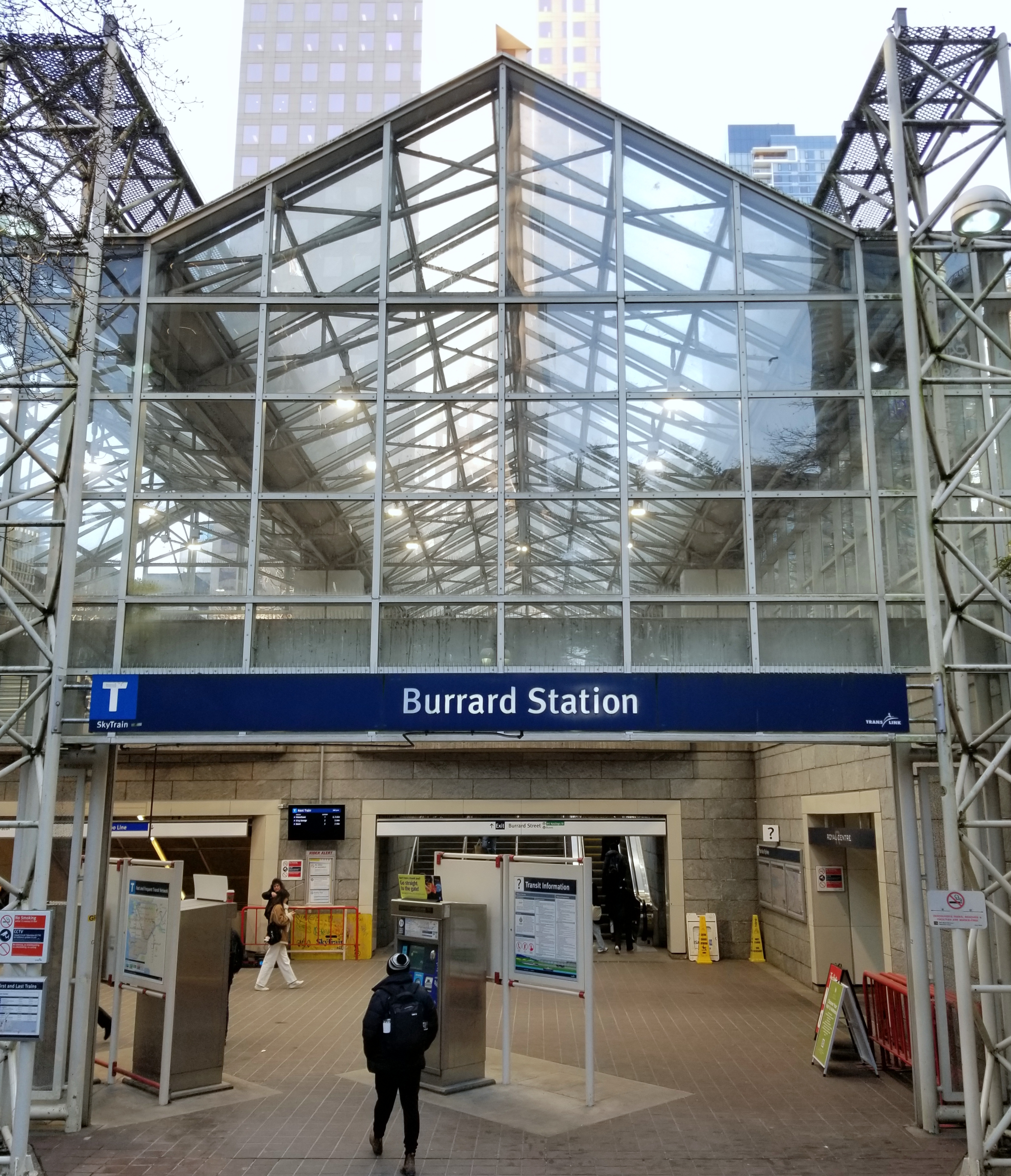
Northern concourse level entrance

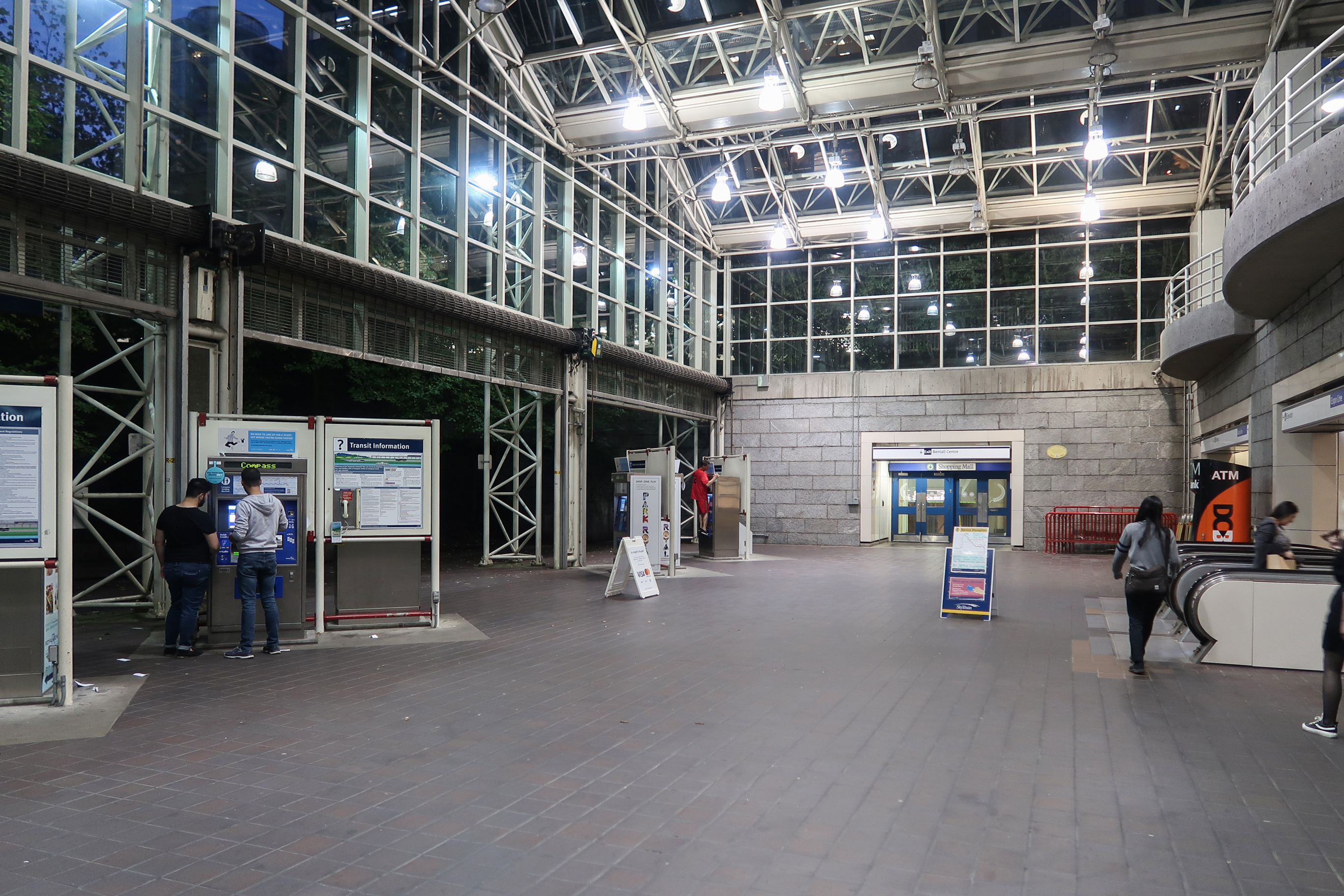
Concourse level station house

- Burrard Street entrance: the main entrance for Burrard station, with connections to Royal Centre and Bentall Centre at concourse level. Three escalators are available between platform and concourse level, and 1 up-escalator between concourse and street level. Fare gates are located at inbound platform level for this entrance.
- Burrard Street elevator access: separated from the main entrance at street level and located to the north, closer to the Burrard and Dunsmuir intersection. A small station house accommodates fare gates at street level. At platform level, the access to the elevator is behind a narrow door and a short corridor.

=== Transit connections ===
Burrard station provides an on-street transit exchange on Burrard, Dunsmuir, and Thurlow Streets. Bus bay assignments are as follows:

Bay	Location	Routes
1	Burrard Street; Southbound	2 Macdonald; 5 Robson; 32 Dunbar (PM peak hours only); N22 Macdonald
2	Dunsmuir Street; Westbound	209 Upper Lynn Valley; 210 Upper Lynn Valley; 211 Seymour; 214 Blueridge (PM peak hours only)
3	Dunsmuir Street; Westbound	22 Knight
4	Thurlow Street; Northbound	Spare
5	Burrard Street; Southbound	22 Downtown (unloading only); 44 UBC
6	Burrard Street; Northbound	R5 Hastings St to SFU
7	Burrard Street; Northbound	To Downtown: 2, 5, 32, 44
