= Willingdon Heights =

Neighbourhood in Burnaby, British Columbia

Coordinates: 49.276°N 123.014°W

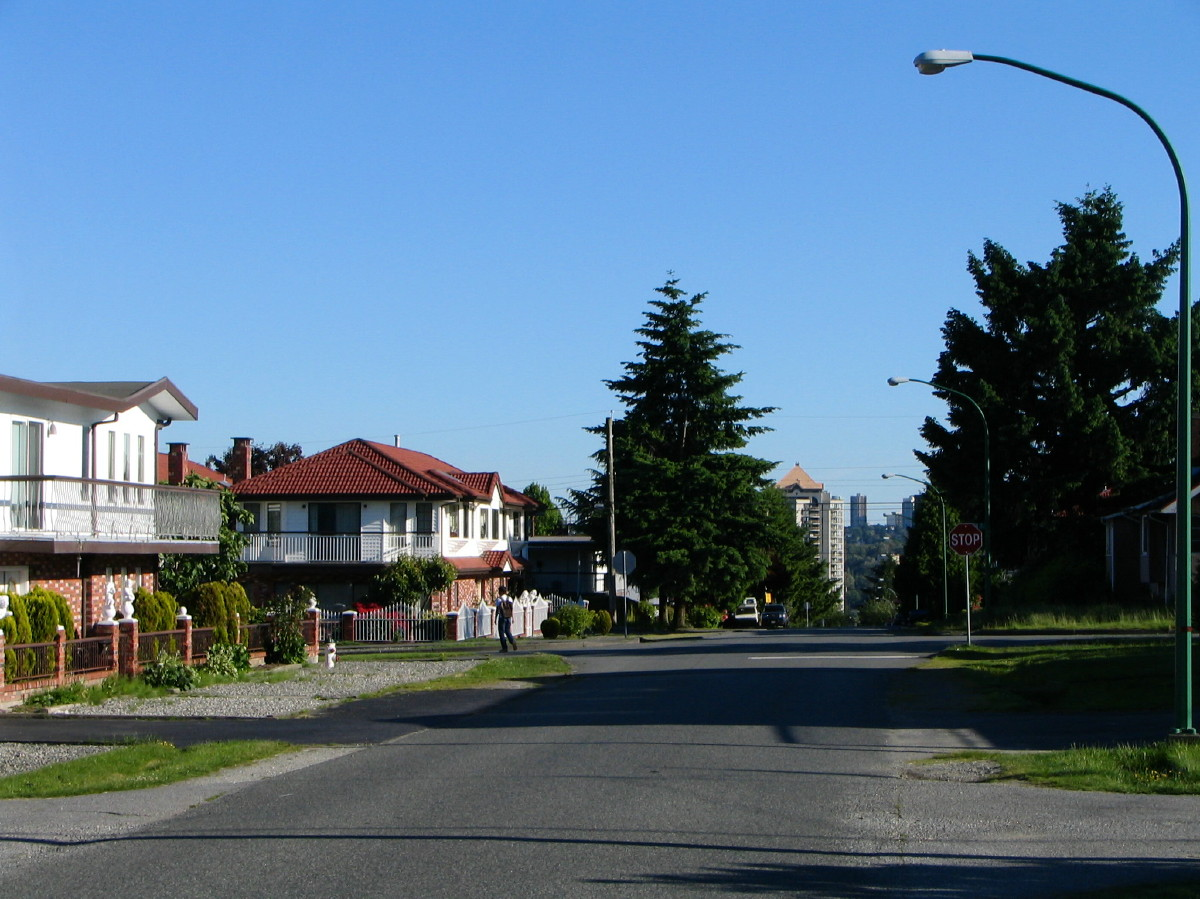
Rosser Avenue with a view of the Polaris tower in the south

Willingdon Heights is a neighbourhood in Burnaby, British Columbia, Canada. It is named after a major Burnaby thoroughfare, Willingdon Avenue, connecting North Burnaby with Kingsway and the Metrotown area in the south. Willingdon Heights was developed significantly during construction spurred by the National Housing Act in 1944 that made mortgage money more widely available and provided joint loans for housing for veterans under the Integrated Housing Plan (IHP).

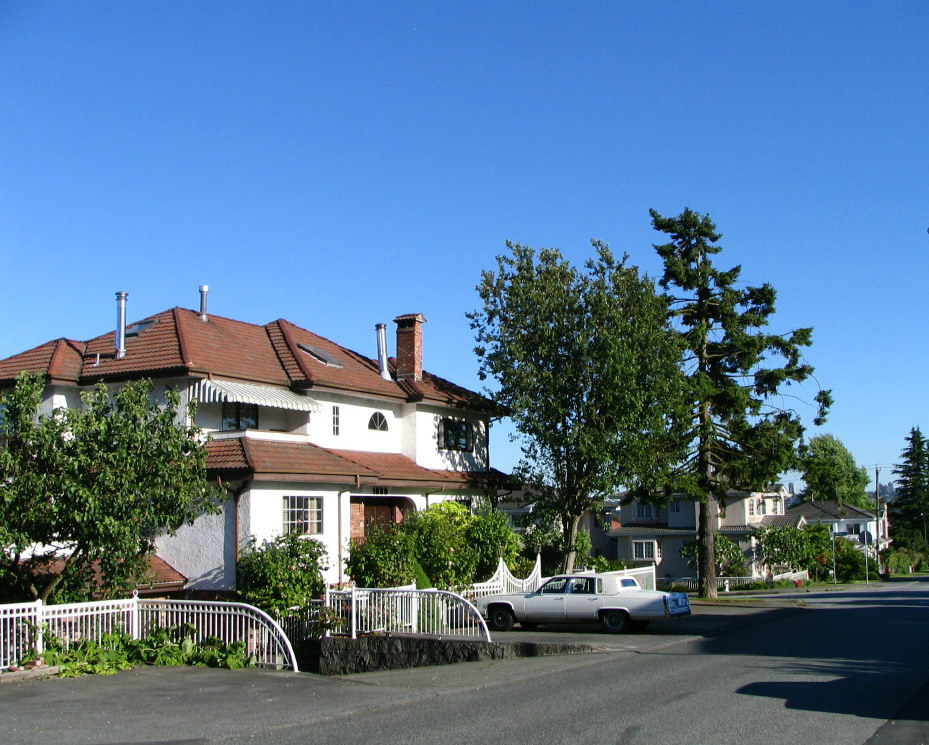
Rosser Avenue

== Location ==
Willingdon Heights is located between two major north–south roads—Boundary Road to the west and Willingdon Avenue to the east. Its northern border lies along busy Hastings Street, while the equally busy Lougheed Highway marks its southern limits.

== Shopping and transportation ==
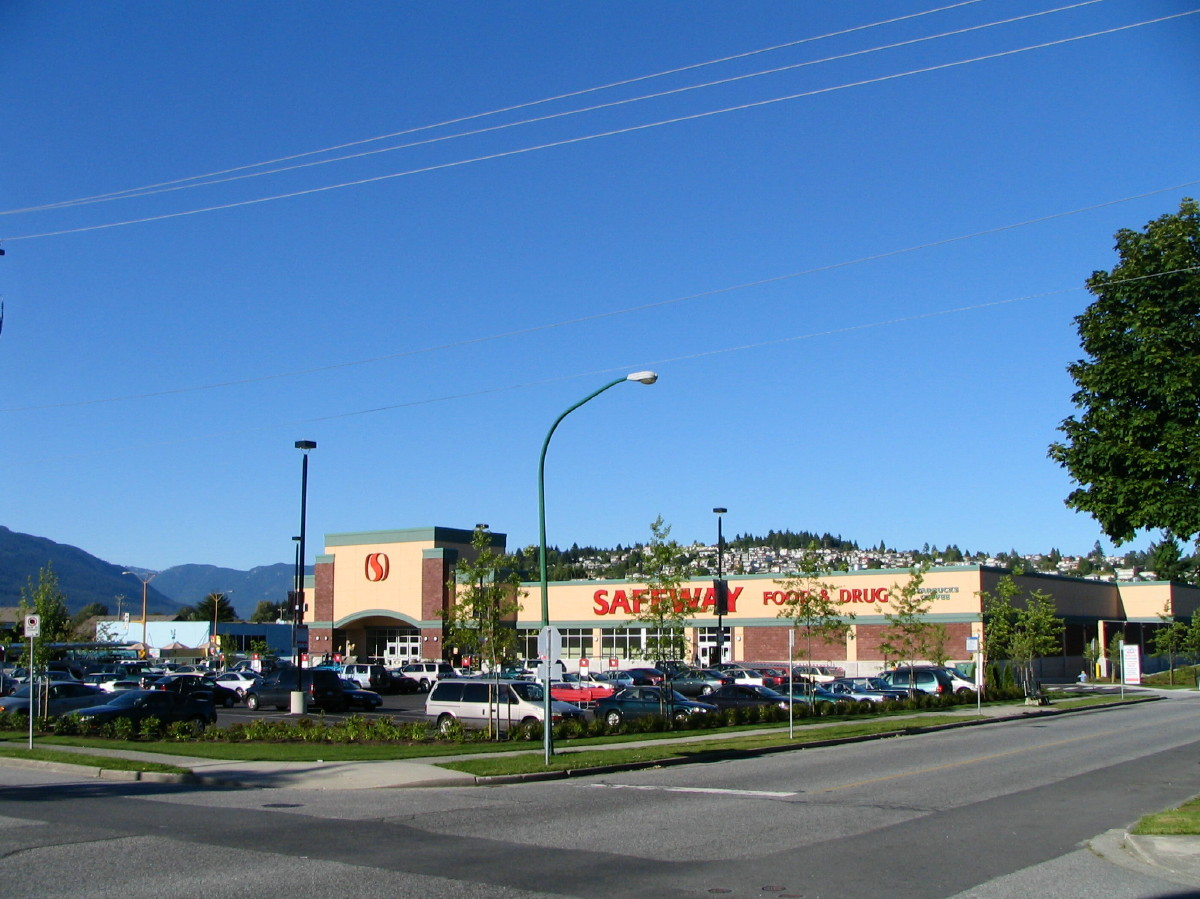
The Safeway at Hastings Street and Willingdon Avenue serves Willingdon Heights and much of North Burnaby.

Willingdon Heights is located close to The Amazing Brentwood, a major shopping and mixed-use development. Several big-box stores (including Staples) are located along the Lougheed Highway. A Costco warehouse is located east of Willingdon Avenue in the Still Creek industrial area.

Brentwood Town Centre Station of the Millennium Line is nearby. A number of bus routes serve the neighbourhood and nearby Willingdon Avenue stops, including local services such as routes 25, 123, 130, 222, and 129, a RapidBus service (R5), with additional transit connections available on Hastings Street and at nearby hubs.

== Community ==
Willingdon Heights Park, at 5.67 hectares, is the largest park in the area. It opened in 1949. It has a sports field and a community centre.

In May 1952, the Willingdon Heights Community Church officially opened, after a concerted effort for over two years to establish a meeting place for the congregation. The effort was supported by Canadian Memorial, as at the time approximately 90% of Willingdon Heights’ population consisted of war veterans and their families.
