= SFU Exchange =

Public transit exchange in Metro Vancouver, Canada

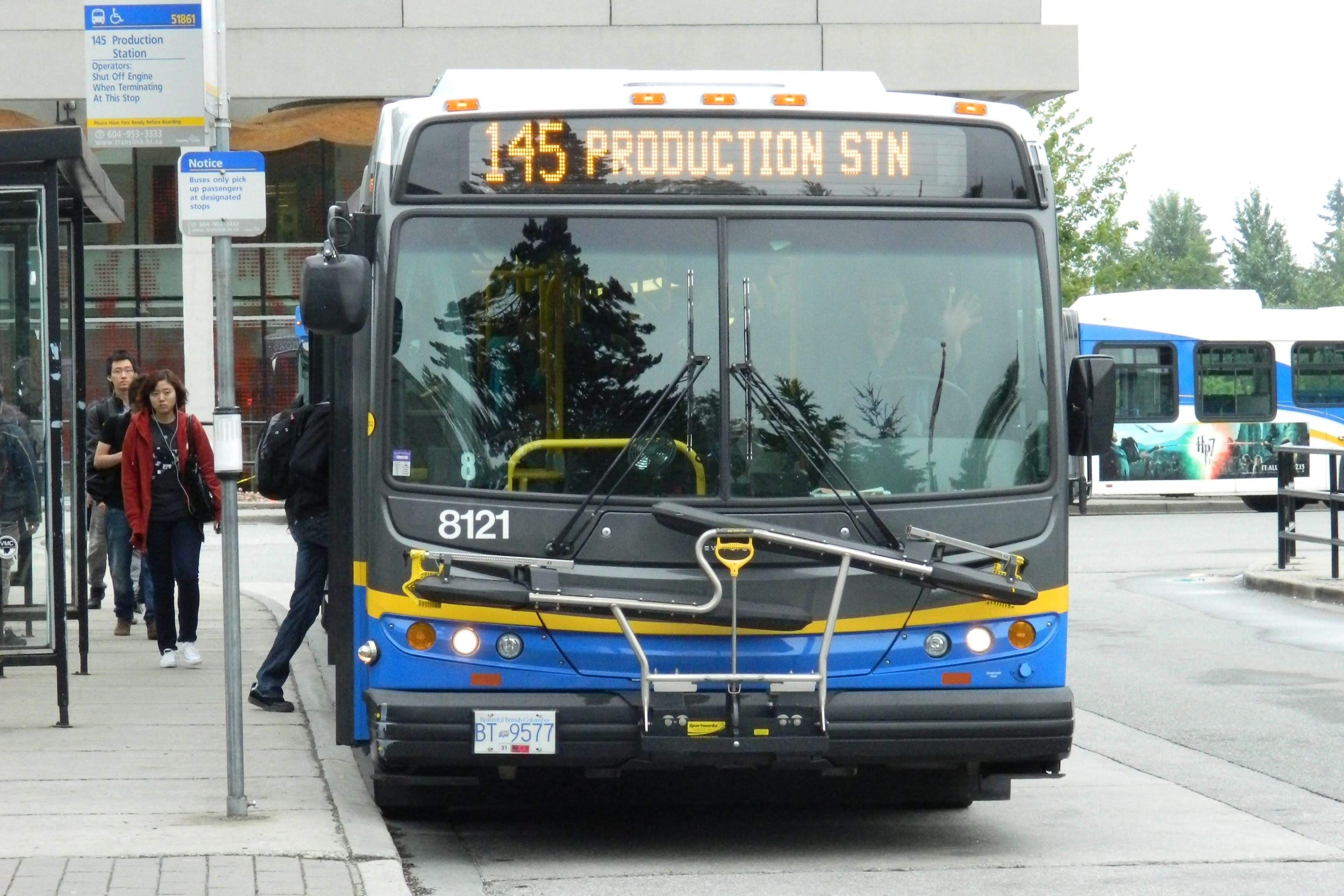

General information
- Location: Simon Fraser University, Burnaby, British Columbia; Canada
- Coordinates: 49°16′43″N 122°54′46″W
- Operator: TransLink
- Bus routes: 5
- Bus stands: 4
- Bus operators: Coast Mountain Bus Company
- Connections: R5 Hastings St

Other information
- Fare zone: 2

History
- Opened: September 3, 1965
Location

SFU Exchange is a bus terminus for TransLink located on the campus of Simon Fraser University in Burnaby, British Columbia. It opened on September 3, 1965, and consists of 2 exchanges: the main exchange located at University Drive at East Campus Road at the eastern part of the campus and the secondary, and original, exchange located at the Transportation Centre. The exchanges primarily serve students, staff, and faculty of Simon Fraser University, as well as residents of UniverCity.

== Routes ==
The following routes terminate at SFU Exchange.

Main exchange
Bay	Route	Destination	Notes
1	145	Production Station	
2	R5 Hastings St	Burrard Station	RapidBus service
2	N35	Downtown	
3	144	Metrotown Station	
4	143	Burquitlam Station	Weekdays only

Transportation Centre exchange
Bay	Route	Destination	Notes
1	R5 Hastings St	Burrard Station	RapidBus service
1	143	Burquitlam Station	Weekdays only
1	144	Metrotown Station	
1	145	Production Station	
1	N35	Downtown	NightBus service
2	R5 Hastings St	SFU	RapidBus Service
2	143	SFU	Weekdays only
2	144	SFU	
2	145	SFU	
2	N35	SFU	NightBus service
3	143	SFU	Weekdays only
3	144	SFU	
3	145	SFU	
3	N35	SFU	NightBus service
