= List of tallest buildings in Burnaby =

Skyline of Burnaby
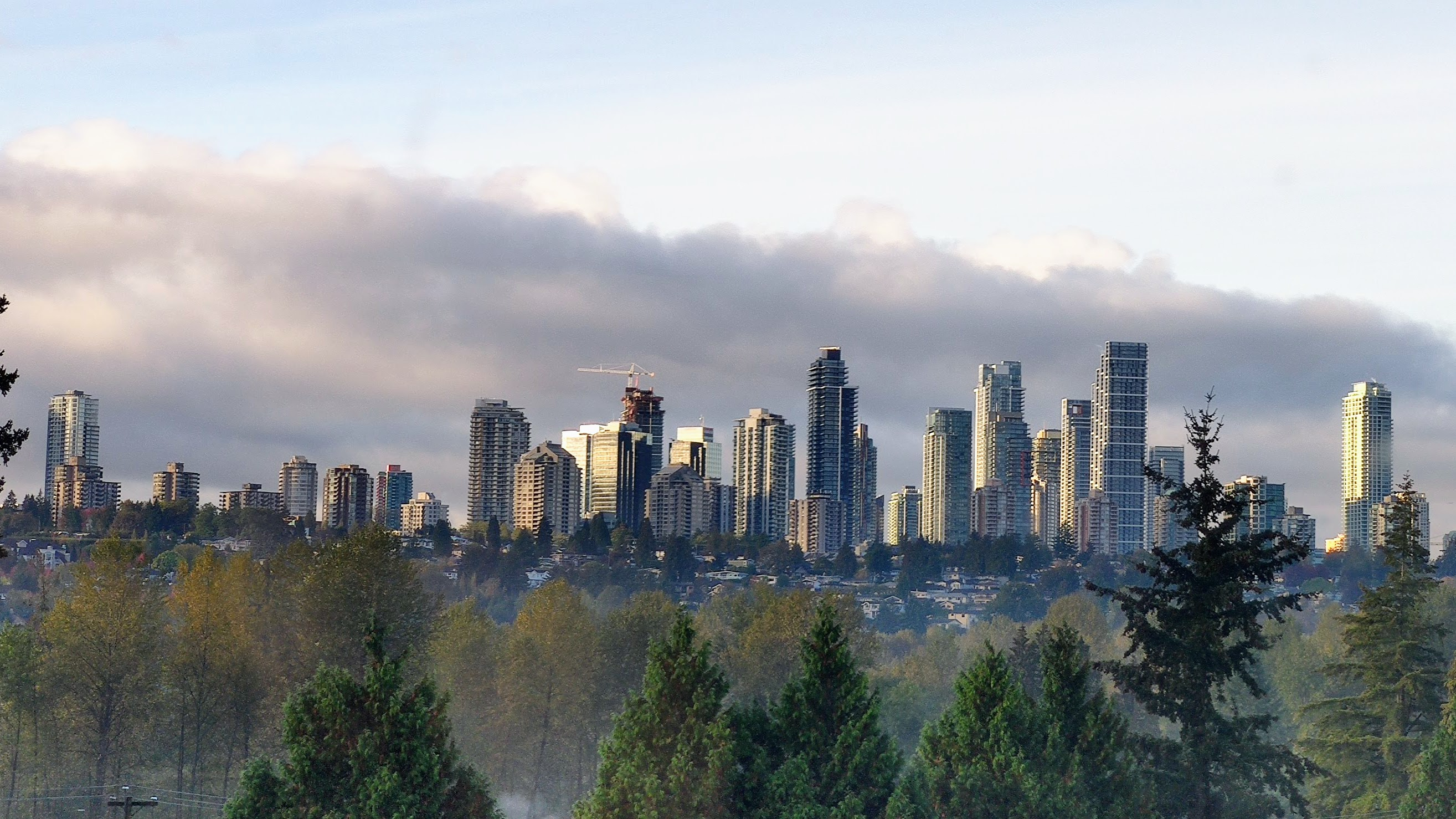
- The Metrotown skyline in 2022
- Tallest building: Two Gilmore Place (2024)
- Tallest building height: 215.8 m (708 ft)
- Major clusters: Metrotown; Brentwood; Edmonds; Lougheed
- First 150 m+ building: Sovereign (2014)

Number of tall buildings (2026)
- Taller than 100 m (328 ft): 57
- Taller than 150 m (492 ft): 17
- Taller than 200 m (656 ft): 1

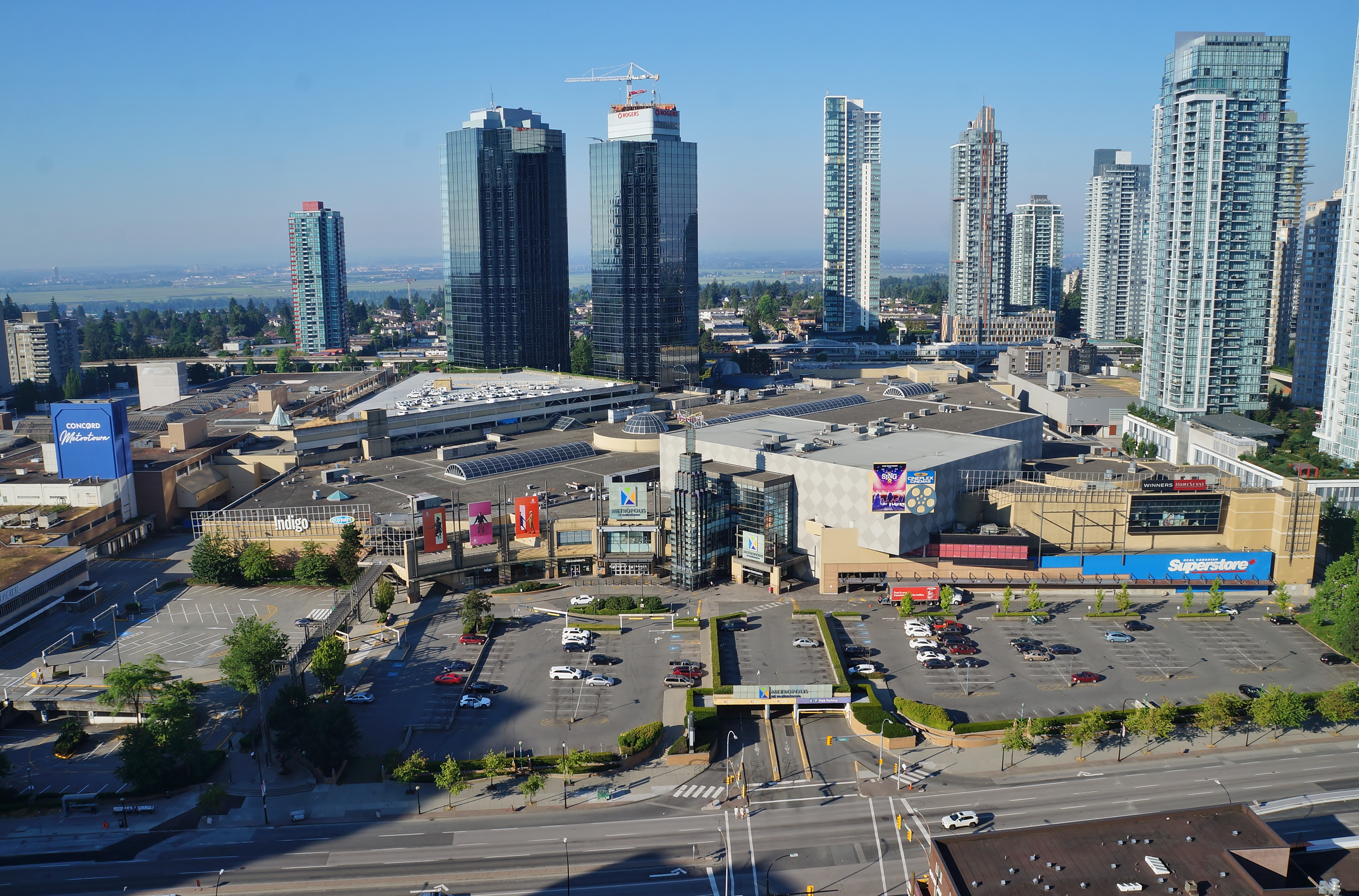
Skyscrapers in Metrotown surrounding the Metropolis at Metrotown shopping mall in 2022

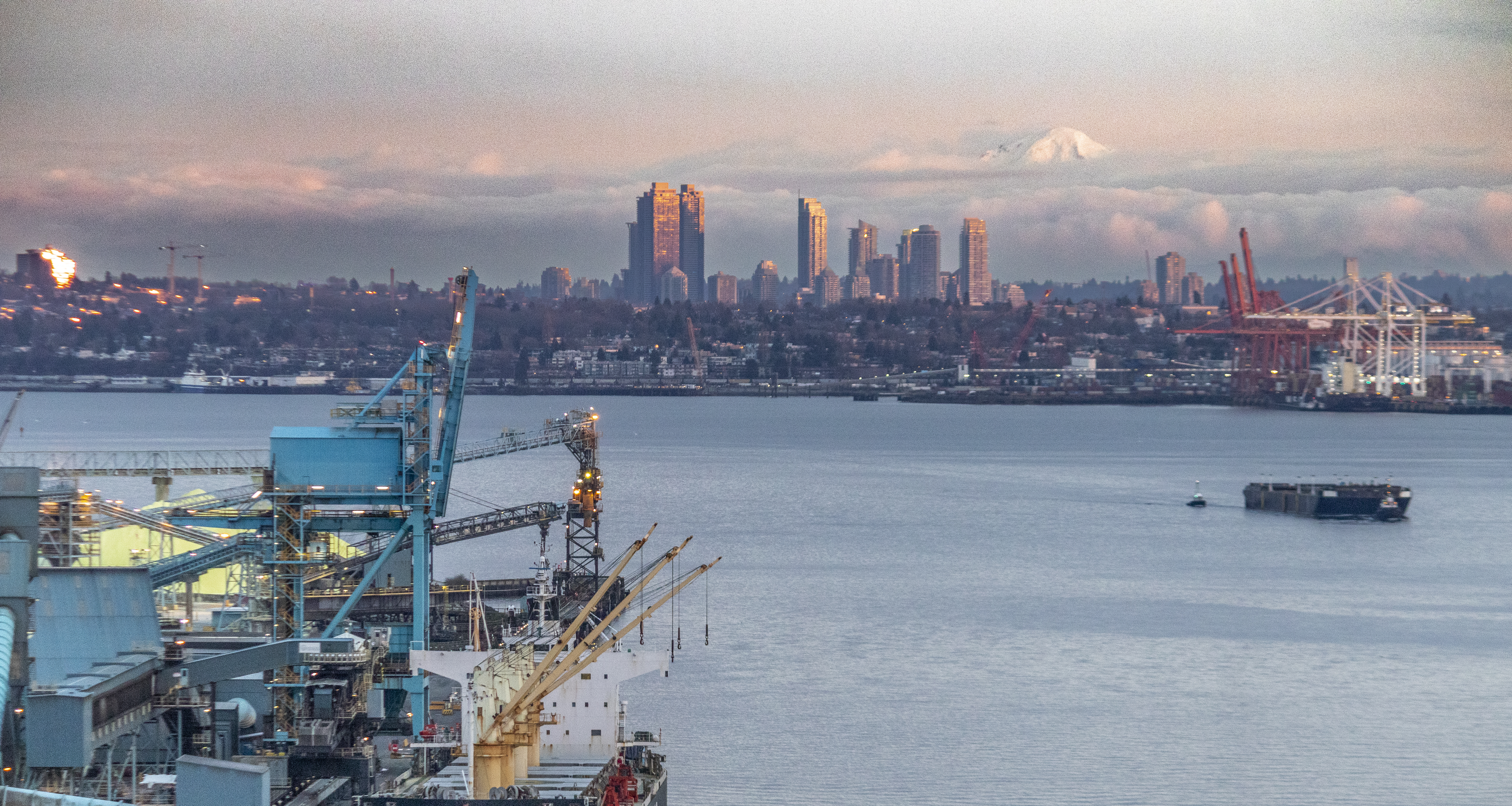
Skyline of Brentwood across the Burrard Inlet from the Lions Gate Bridge

Burnaby is the third-largest city in the Canadian province of British Columbia, with a population of nearly 250,000 as of 2021. Part of Greater Vancouver, Burnaby has seen drastic changes to its skyline in the early 21st century. As of 2026, Burnaby has 57 buildings taller than 100 metres (328 ft), 17 of which are taller than 150 metres (492 ft)—more than Vancouver itself or any other city in British Columbia, and the fourth-most in Canada after Toronto, Calgary, and Montreal. Burnaby has the most buildings taller than 100 m (328 ft) of any city in Northern America that is not the main city in its metropolitan area. The tallest building in Burnaby is Two Gilmore Place, a 64-storey residential skyscraper that rises 216 m (708 ft) in height in Brentwood and was completed in 2024. It is the tallest building in British Columbia.

The first high-rises in Burnaby appeared in the 1970s and 1980s in Metrotown, as the area was developed into a regional town centre. The opening of the Metrotown shopping centre and two adjacent malls in 1986 (now a single mall, Metropolis at Metrotown) preceded the completion of the Metrotower office towers soon after. Since the 2010s, Burnaby has been undergoing a surge in residential high-rise construction, as part of a greater condominium boom throughout Greater Vancouver. The city had only three buildings taller than 100 m (328 ft) in 2010, expanding to 57 by 2025. Much of this development has been transit-oriented, being built near an Expo or Millennium Line station of the SkyTrain, Greater Vancouver's light metro system.

Burnaby's main clusters of tall buildings are its four "town centres" of Metrotown, Brentwood, Lougheed, and Edmonds, all of which have experienced significant growth since 2010. The city government purposefully channels development into these town centres as part of its urban planning strategy. Metrotown, in Burnaby's southwest, has the most high-rises taller than 100 m (328 ft). Bisected by the Kingsway, the area is mainly served by Metrotown station. Major projects include Sovereign, Burnaby's tallest skyscraper from 2014 to 2017 at 156 m (511 ft), and the five-tower Station Square development, completed in 2022. The Concord Metrotown redevelopment, under construction since 2022, will include the 230 m (755 ft) Sky Park, which would become the tallest building in British Columbia upon completion.

Brentwood, in the city's northwest, has grown to rival Metrotown as Burnaby's largest skyline during the 2020s. Projects that have reshaped the skyline include the three-tower Gilmore Place, the redevelopment of The Amazing Brentwood shopping mall, and the multi-phased Concord Brentwood. Since 2024, all six of Burnaby's tallest buildings are in Brentwood. The City of Lougheed (formerly Lougheed Town Centre), a shopping centre Burnaby's east, is undergoing major redevelopment as a master-planned community. In Edmonds, in the city's southeast, the three-tower King's Crossing development at the intersection between Kingsway and Edmonds was completed in 2020. The ongoing Southgate City project could include over twenty high-rises. Despite its name being a portmanteau of Burnaby and Coquitlam, the neighbourhood of Burquitlam and its towers are located within the city of Coquitlam instead.

== History ==
Number of buildings by height in Burnaby by the end of each year, based on the information in this article. Click on the legend to toggle a specific height on or off. View chart definition.

== Cityscape ==
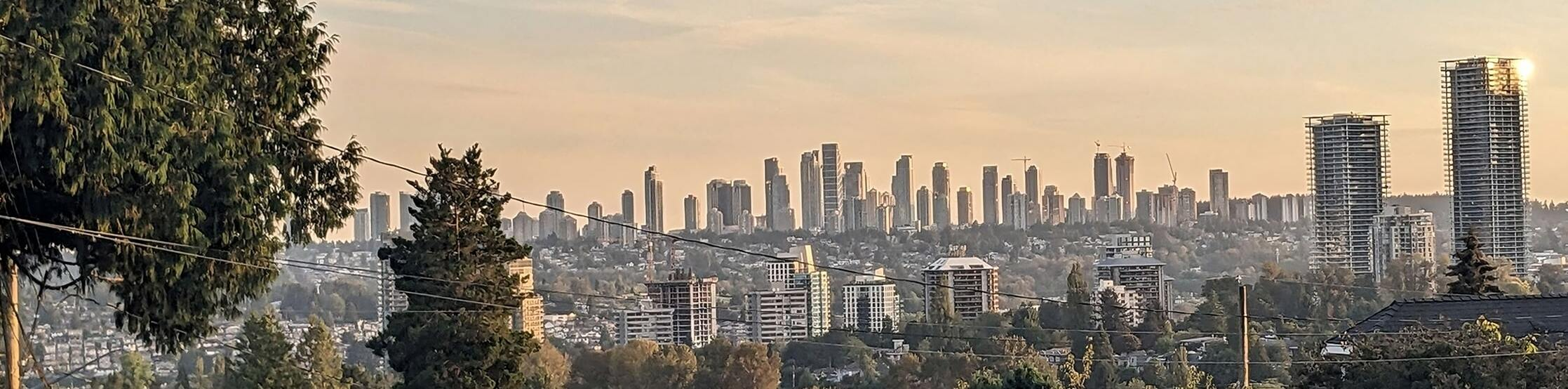
Panorama of Burnaby in Autumn of 2024, with Brentwood in the foreground Metrotown skyline in the distance

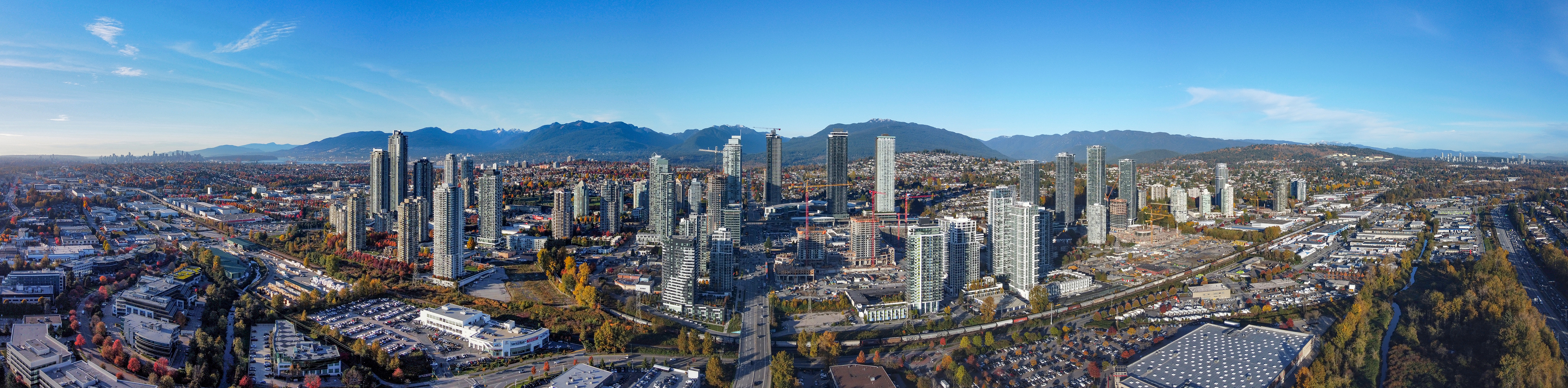
Aerial image of Brentwood Town Centre in 2025, centred on Willingdon Avenue

== Map of tallest buildings ==
=== Metrotown ===
Metrotown is the largest cluster of tall buildings in Burnaby and in Greater Vancouver outside of Vancouver itself. It is located east of Central Park. The area overlaps with the neighbourhood of Maywood and is centred around the Metropolis at Metrotown shopping mall. Metrotown is served by the Metrotown and Patterson stations on the SkyTrain. Each marker is numbered by the building's height rank in Burnaby, and coloured by the decade of its completion.

Buildings taller than 100 m (328 ft) in Metrotown, Burnaby.
- 1980s
- 1990s
- 2000s
- 2010s
- 2020s
7 Highline
8 6000 McKay Avenue
10 4670 Assembly Way
13 Sovereign
22 Gold House North
23 Metroplace
24 Central Park House
25 6080 McKay Avenue
26 Sussex
27 The Standard Metrotown
28 6098 Station Street
30 Sun Towers 1
31 Modello
33 Silver
35 Telford on the Walk
38 The Park Metrotown
41 The Met 2
42 Vittorio
43 Chancellor
44 Polaris at Metrotown
45 Riviera on the Park
46 Metro Tower II
47 Midori
48 Broadview
49 Metro Tower III
50 Centrepoint
51 Artesia Metrotown
52 4688 Kingsway
54 The Met
55 Aldynne in the Park
56 Metro Tower I

=== Brentwood ===
Brentwood, also called Brentwood Park, has the second largest cluster of tall buildings in Burnaby. It contains the city's five tallest buildings. The area is known for The Amazing Brentwood shopping mall, which opened in 1961 and closed in 2025 for redevelopment. Brentwood is served by the Brentwood Town Centre and Gilmore stations on the SkyTrain.

Buildings taller than 100 m (328 ft) in Brentwood, Burnaby.
- 2010s
- 2020s
1 Two Gilmore Place
2 Solo District - Altus
3 Brentwood One
4 Brentwood Two
5 Hillside East C at Concord Brentwood
6 Brentwood Three
9 One Gilmore Place
12 Hillside West B at Concord Brentwood
14 Hillside East D at Concord Brentwood
15 Hillside West A at Concord Brentwood
16 Triomphe Residences
17 Three Gilmore Place
18 Solo District - Stratus
21 Solo District - Cirrus
29 Escala
32 Akimbo
34 Fulton House
36 Waterfall at Lumina Brentwood
37 Eclipse at Lumina Brentwood
53 Étoile Tower I

== Tallest buildings ==
This list ranks completed buildings in Burnaby that stand at least 100 m (328 ft) tall as of 2026, based on standard height measurement. This includes spires and architectural details but does not include antenna masts. The “Year” column indicates the year of completion. Buildings tied in height are sorted by year of completion with earlier buildings ranked first, and then alphabetically.

Was the tallest building in Burnaby upon completion

Rank	Name	Image	Location	Height m (ft)	Floors	Year	Purpose	Notes
1	Two Gilmore Place		Brentwood 49°15′57″N 123°00′50″W	215.8 (708)	64	2024	Residential	Tallest building in Brentwood Park, in Burnaby, in Greater Vancouver, and in British Columbia. The second in the province to exceed 200 metres in height. Tallest building completed in Burnaby in the 2020s. Part of the three-tower Gilmore Place development.
2	Solo District - Altus		Brentwood 49°15′58″N 123°00′13″W	187.8 (616)	49	2017	Mixed-use	Tallest building in Burnaby from 2017 to 2024. Mixed-use residential and hotel building. Tallest mixed-use building in Burnaby. Tied with the Paradox Hotel Vancouver for the third tallest building in British Columbia.
3	Brentwood One		Brentwood 49°16′04″N 123°00′09″W	186.2 (611)	56	2019	Residential	
4	Brentwood Two		Brentwood 49°16′00″N 123°00′03″W	186.2 (611)	56	2019	Residential	
5	Hillside East C at Concord Brentwood	–	Brentwood 49°15′54″N 122°59′39″W	182.9 (600)	55	2024	Residential	
6	Brentwood Three		Brentwood 49°16′00″N 122°59′58″W	182 (597)	55	2021	Residential	
7	Highline	–	Metrotown 49°13′28″N 123°00′10″W	177 (581)	53	2024	Mixed-use	Mixed-use residential and hotel building. Tallest building in Metrotown. Formerly called The Eclipse. The hotel component is known as Hyatt Place Metrotown.
8	6000 McKay Avenue	–	Metrotown 49°13′44″N 123°00′10″W	172 (564)	52	2022	Residential	Part of Station Square. Also known as Station Square Tower 5.
9	One Gilmore Place	–	Brentwood 49°15′55″N 123°00′50″W	171 (561)	51	2024	Residential	Part of the three-tower Gilmore Place development.
10	4670 Assembly Way	–	Metrotown 49°13′41″N 123°00′09″W	163 (535)	48	2018	Residential	Part of Station Square. Also known as Station Square Tower 2.
11	The City of Lougheed Tower One	–	Lougheed 49°15′01″N 122°53′40″W	158.5 (520)	55	2023	Residential	Tallest building in Lougheed. Part of the City of Lougheed development.
12	Hillside West B at Concord Brentwood	–	Brentwood 49°15′55″N 122°59′42″W	158 (518)	49	2022	Residential	
13	Sovereign		Metrotown 49°13′50″N 123°00′15″W	155.9 (511)	45	2014	Mixed-use	Tallest building in Burnaby from 2014 to 2017. Mixed-use residential and hotel building.
14	Hillside East D at Concord Brentwood	–	Brentwood 49°15′53″N 122°59′35″W	154 (505)	45	2024	Residential	
15	Hillside West A at Concord Brentwood	–	Brentwood 49°15′56″N 122°59′45″W	153 (502)	44	2022	Residential	
16	Triomphe Residences	–	Brentwood 49°16′04″N 123°00′50″W	152.4 (500)	46	2020	Residential	
17	Three Gilmore Place	–	Brentwood 49°15′57″N 123°00′46″W	150.3 (493)	43	2024	Residential	Part of the three-tower Gilmore Place development.
18	Solo District - Stratus		Brentwood 49°15′58″N 123°00′20″W	149.1 (489)	48	2015	Residential	
19	The City of Lougheed Tower Two	–	Lougheed 49°14′59″N 122°53′40″W	147.9 (485)	48	2023	Residential	Part of the City of Lougheed development.
20	Icon at Southgate City	–	Edmonds 49°12′37″N 122°56′56″W	145.4 (477)	46	2025	Residential	Tallest building in Edmonds.
21	Solo District - Cirrus	–	Brentwood 49°15′55″N 123°00′19″W	143.6 (471)	39	2022	Residential	Also stylized as Cirrus at Solo District.
22	Gold House North	–	Metrotown 49°13′35″N 123°00′24″W	141.2 (463)	41	2020	Residential	
23	Metroplace	–	Metrotown 49°13′31″N 123°00′15″W	141.1 (463)	46	2014	Residential	Redevelopment south of Metrotown Mall.
24	Central Park House	–	Metrotown 49°13′49″N 123°00′33″W	140.8 (462)	42	2025	Residential	
25	6080 McKay Avenue	–	Metrotown 49°13′42″N 123°00′13″W	140.5 (461)	41	2021	Residential	Part of Station Square. Also known as Station Square Tower 4.
26	Sussex	–	Metrotown 49°13′45″N 122°59′53″W	138.4 (454)	41	2021	Residential	
27	The Standard Metrotown	–	Metrotown 49°13′29″N 123°00′37″W	138.4 (454)	43	2025	Residential	
28	6098 Station Street	–	Metrotown 49°13′39″N 123°00′11″W	138 (453)	38	2017	Residential	Part of Station Square. Also known as Station Square Tower 3.
29	Escala	–	Brentwood 49°16′06″N 123°00′49″W	137.2 (450)	42	2019	Residential	
30	Sun Towers 1	–	Metrotown 49°13′32″N 123°00′18″W	136.9 (449)	42	2022	Mixed-use	Mixed-use residential and office building.
31	Modello	–	Metrotown 49°13′37″N 123°00′28″W	134 (440)	37	2017	Residential	
32	Akimbo	–	Brentwood 49°15′53″N 123°00′33″W	132.3 (434)	40	2023	Residential	
33	Silver	–	Metrotown 49°13′33″N 123°00′21″W	127 (417)	38	2015	Residential	
34	Fulton House	–	Brentwood 49°15′46″N 123°00′30″W	125 (410)	41	2020	Residential	
35	Telford on the Walk	–	Metrotown 49°13′28″N 123°00′17″W	124.5 (408)	40	2024	Residential	
36	Waterfall at Lumina Brentwood	–	Brentwood 49°15′48″N 122°59′56″W	122.9 (403)	38	2020	Residential	
37	Eclipse at Lumina Brentwood	–	Brentwood 49°15′45″N 122°59′57″W	122.9 (403)	34	2024	Residential	
38	The Park Metrotown	–	Metrotown 49°13′24″N 122°59′38″W	120.1 (394)	39	2017	Residential	One of the buildings east of Bonsor Recreation Center.
39	The City of Lougheed Tower Three	–	Lougheed 49°14′58″N 122°53′36″W	117.4 (385)	37	2023	Residential	Part of the City of Lougheed development.
40	KC2 at King's Crossing	–	Edmonds 49°13′08″N 122°57′01″W	117.1 (384)	36	2020	Residential	
41	The Met 2	–	Metrotown 49°13′28″N 122°59′38″W	115.9 (380)	38	2017	Residential	One of The Met twin towers.
42	Vittorio	–	Metrotown 49°13′22″N 122°59′33″W	114.9 (377)	38	2020	Residential	
43	Chancellor		Metrotown 49°13′29″N 122°59′42″W	114.6 (376)	37	2013	Residential	Tallest building in Burnaby briefly from 2013 to 2014.
44	Polaris at Metrotown	–	Metrotown 49°13′20″N 122°59′36″W	114.3 (375)	36	2021	Residential	
45	Riviera on the Park	–	Metrotown 49°13′30″N 122°59′35″W	112.5 (369)	35	2025	Residential	
46	Metro Tower II		Metrotown 49°13′32″N 123°00′03″W	111.3 (365)	30	1991	Office	Tallest building in Burnaby from 1991 to 2013. Tallest office building in Burnaby. Also written as Metrotower II.
47	Midori	–	Metrotown 49°13′24″N 122°59′32″W	110.7 (363)	37	2018	Residential	
48	Broadview	–	Metrotown 49°13′46″N 123°00′26″W	110.1 (361)	35	2025	Residential	
49	Metro Tower III	–	Metrotown 49°13′31″N 123°00′04″W	109 (358)	27	2013	Office	Also written as Metrotower III.
50	Centrepoint	–	Metrotown 49°13′41″N 122°59′46″W	108.6 (356)	32	2008	Residential	
51	Artesia Metrotown	–	Metrotown 49°14′00″N 123°00′34″W	108.2 (355)	31	2025	Residential	
52	4688 Kingsway	–	Metrotown 49°13′44″N 123°00′06″W	108 (354)	35	2015	Residential	Part of Station Square. Also known as Station Square Tower 1.
53	Étoile Tower I	–	Brentwood 49°15′48″N 122°59′11″W	107.6 (353)	32	2021	Residential	
54	The Met	–	Metrotown 49°13′26″N 122°59′38″W	107.3 (352)	34	2015	Residential	
55	Aldynne in the Park	–	Metrotown 49°13′54″N 123°00′42″W	107.3 (352)	35	2017	Residential	
56	Metro Tower I		Metrotown 49°13′34″N 123°00′05″W	103.6 (340)	28	1989	Office	Tallest building in Burnaby from 1989 to 1991. Also written as Metrotower I.
57	King's Crossing One	–	Edmonds 49°13′07″N 122°56′58″W	102.4 (336)	31	2020	Residential	

== Tallest under construction or proposed ==
=== Under construction ===
The following table includes buildings under construction in Burnaby that are planned to be at least 100 m (328 ft) tall as of 2026, based on standard height measurement. The “Year” column indicates the expected year of completion. Buildings that are on hold are not included. Buildings whose exact height are unknown are included at the bottom of the table and sorted by floor count if they have at least 34 floors.

Name	Height m (ft)	Floors	Year	Notes
Sky Park	230.1 (755)	65	2026	Would become the tallest building in Burnaby upon completion.
Citizen	210.8 (692)	66	2027	
Solo District Aerius	203.3 (667)	52	2026	
Brentwood Five	182 (597)	53	2027	
Central Tower at Sky Park	165.2 (542)	45	2026	
Etoile Gold	153 (502)	47	2028	
Nuvo	141.3 (464)	43	2026	
South Yards II	139 (456)	43	2026	Renamed from The Grove under previous developer.
Tower Six at The Amazing Brentwood	127 (417)	39	2027	
West Tower at Sky Park	125.6 (412)	33	2026	
Grosvenor Brentwood Block A	–	70	2029	May become the tallest building in Burnaby upon completion, overtaking Sky Park.
Grosvenor Brentwood Block C	–	55	2029	
Tower Five at The Amazing Brentwood	–	53	2028	
Slate Brentwood	–	44	2026	
Perla	–	38	2026	
South Yards I	–	36	2026	

== Timeline of tallest buildings ==
Name	Image	Years as tallest	Height m (ft)	Floors	Reference
Metro Tower I		1989–1991	103.6 (340)	28	
Metro Tower II		1991–2013	111.3 (365)	30	
Chancellor		2013–2014	114.6 (376)	37	
Sovereign		2014–2017	155.9 (511)	45	
Solo District - Altus		2017–2024	187.8 (616)	49	
Two Gilmore Place		2024–present	215.8 (708)	64	

== Skylines ==
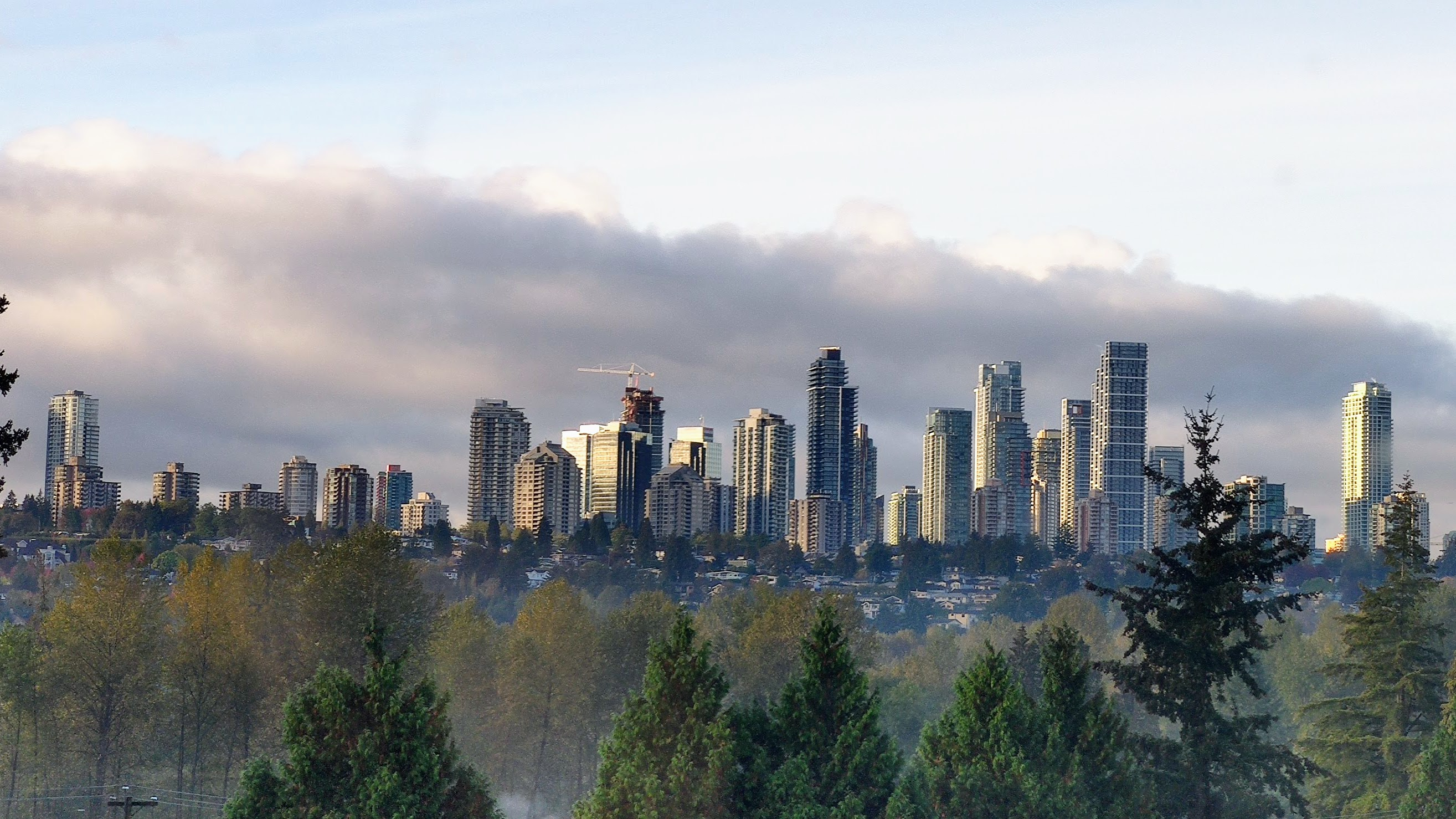
Metrotown

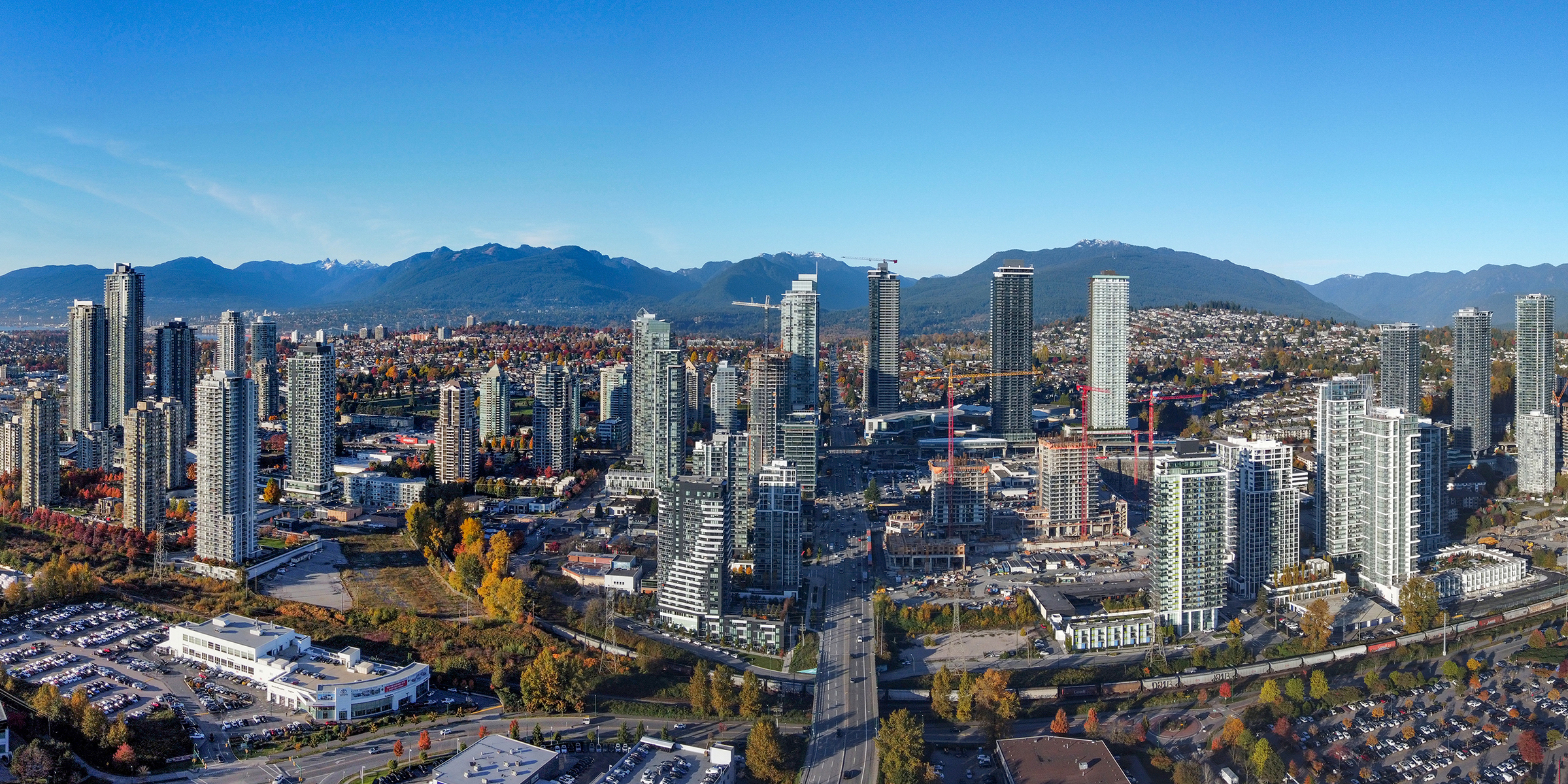
Brentwood

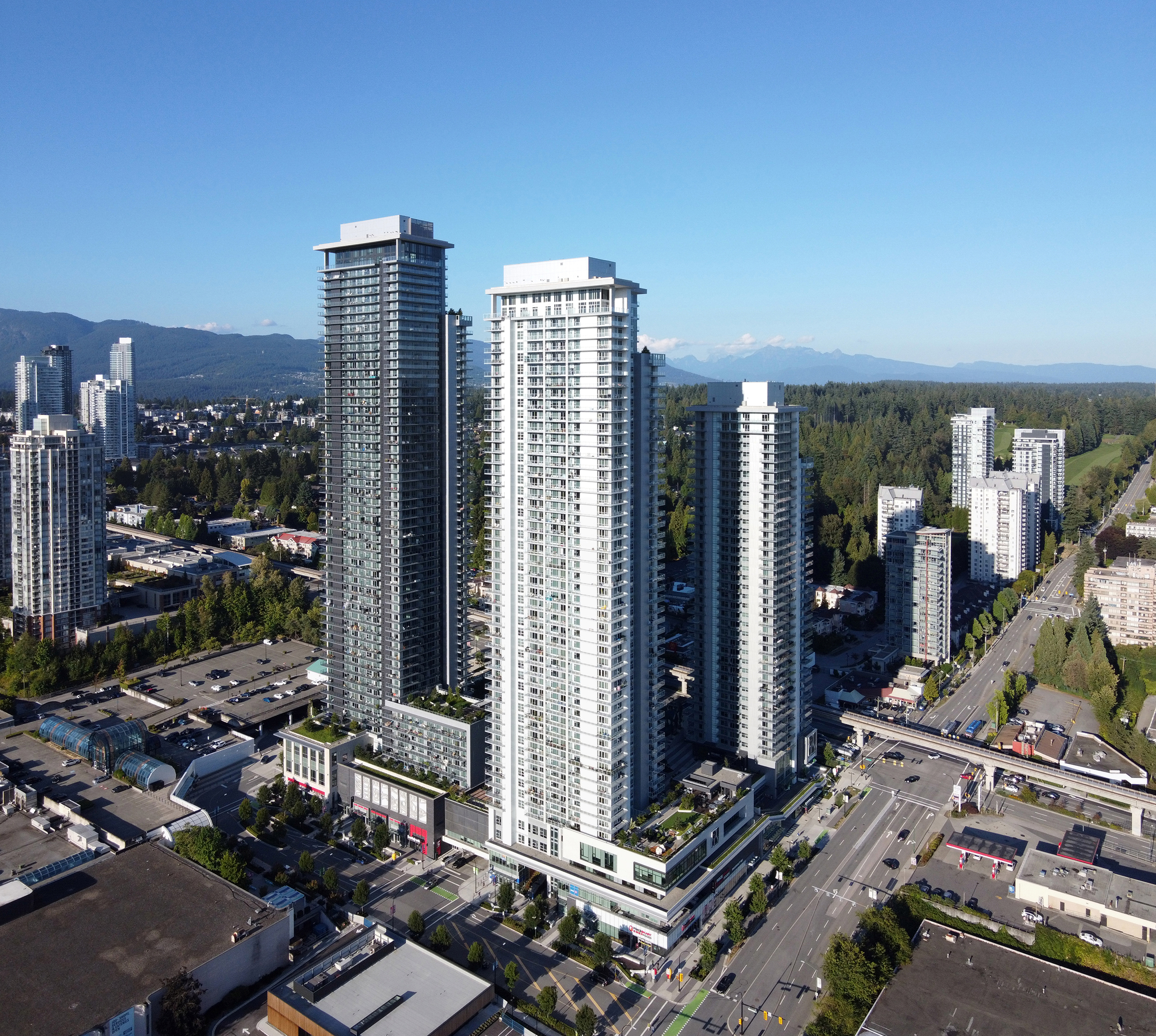
Lougheed

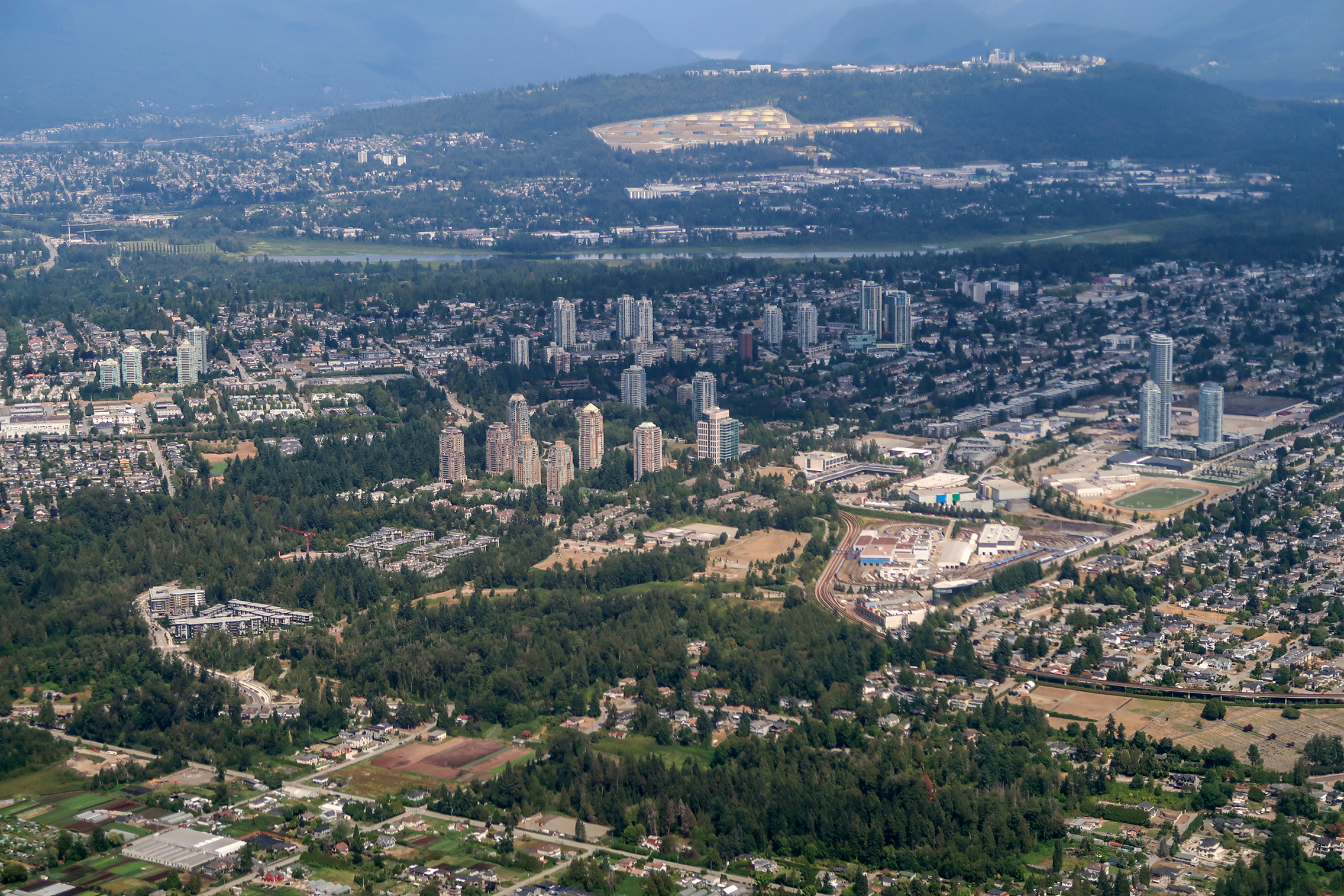
Edmonds

== See also ==
- List of tallest buildings in British Columbia
- List of tallest buildings in Vancouver
- List of tallest buildings in Coquitlam
- List of tallest buildings in Surrey
