= Sky Park (Burnaby) =

General information
- Location: Burnaby, British Columbia, Canada

Height
- Height: 755 ft

Sky Park is a 3-tower, mixed-use development, currently under construction, in Metrotown, Burnaby, British Columbia. The 230-metre-tall (755 ft) Grand Tower will be the tallest building in British Columbia. The other 2 towers will be 45 and 33 storeys.

== History ==
In 2015, Concord Pacific bought a 3.6-hectare (9-acre) parcel of land from Sears, which housed a Sears, a Toys R Us, and parking. Plans for the land first went to public hearing in 2017. The development has an expected completion date of 2026.

== See also ==
- List of tallest buildings in Canada
- List of tallest buildings in British Columbia
- List of tallest buildings in Burnaby
