= List of tallest buildings in British Columbia =

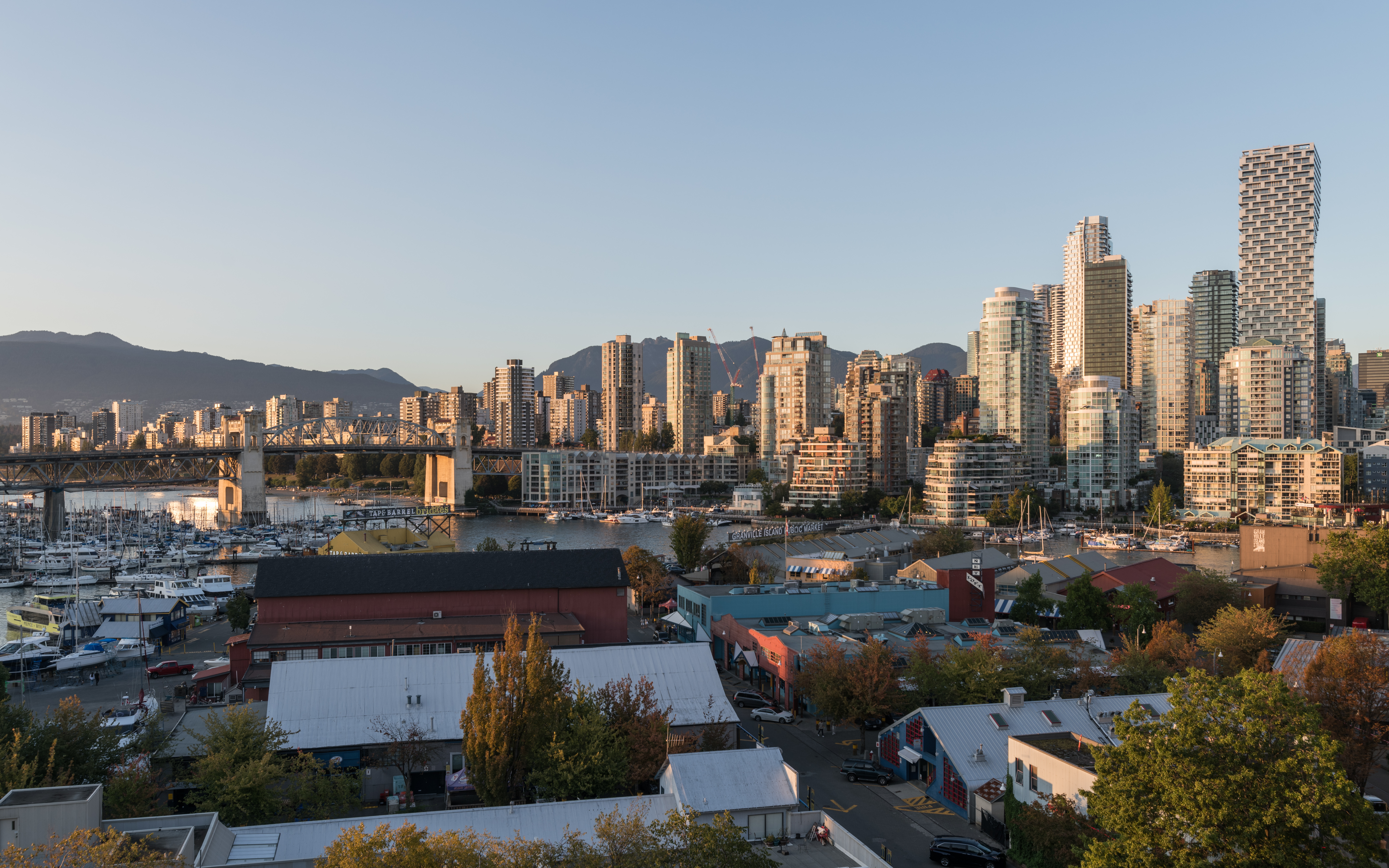
Vancouver's skyline from Granville Street Bridge in 2024

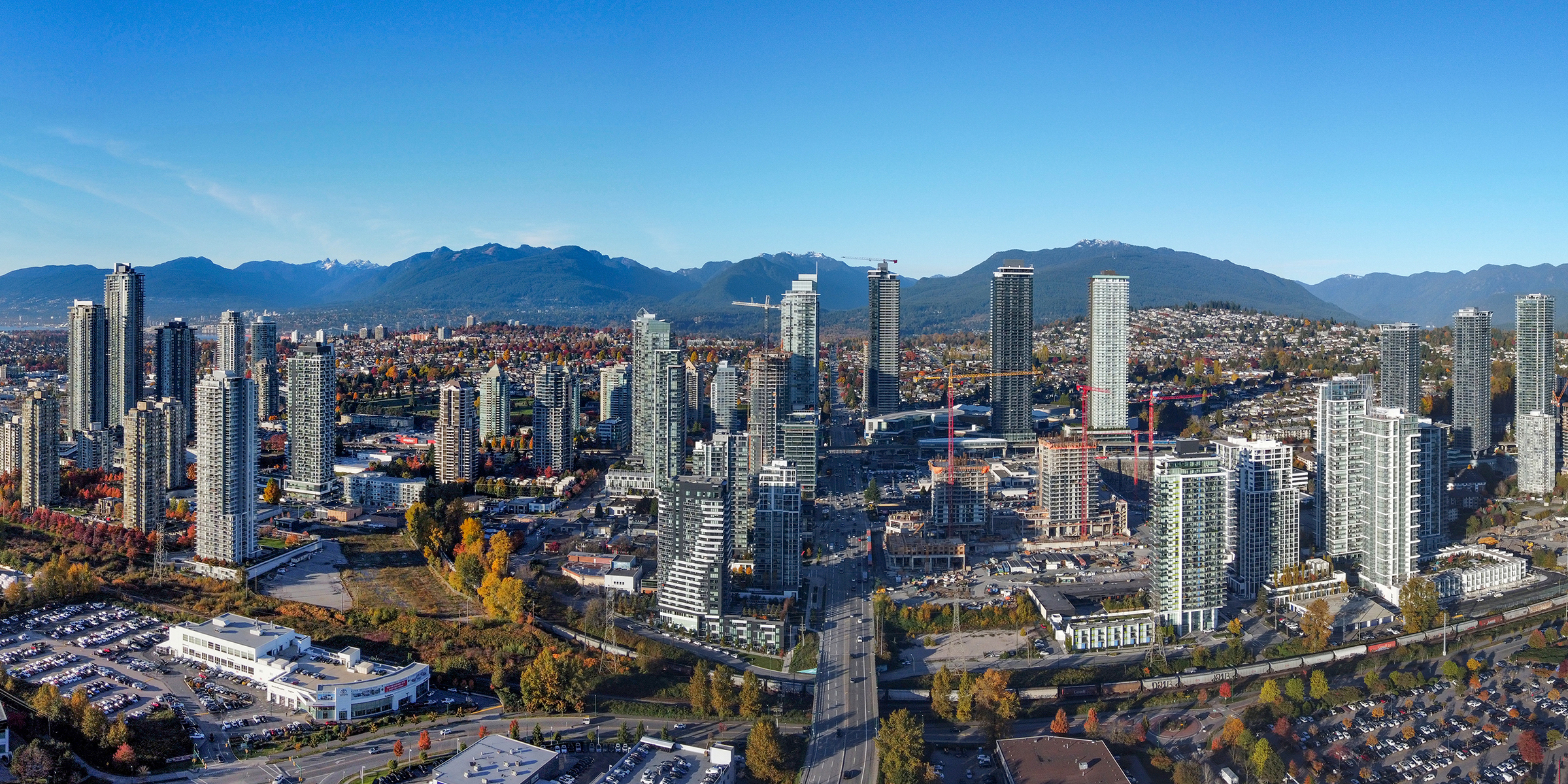
Brentwood, in Burnaby, is home to Two Gilmore Place, the tallest building in British Columbia

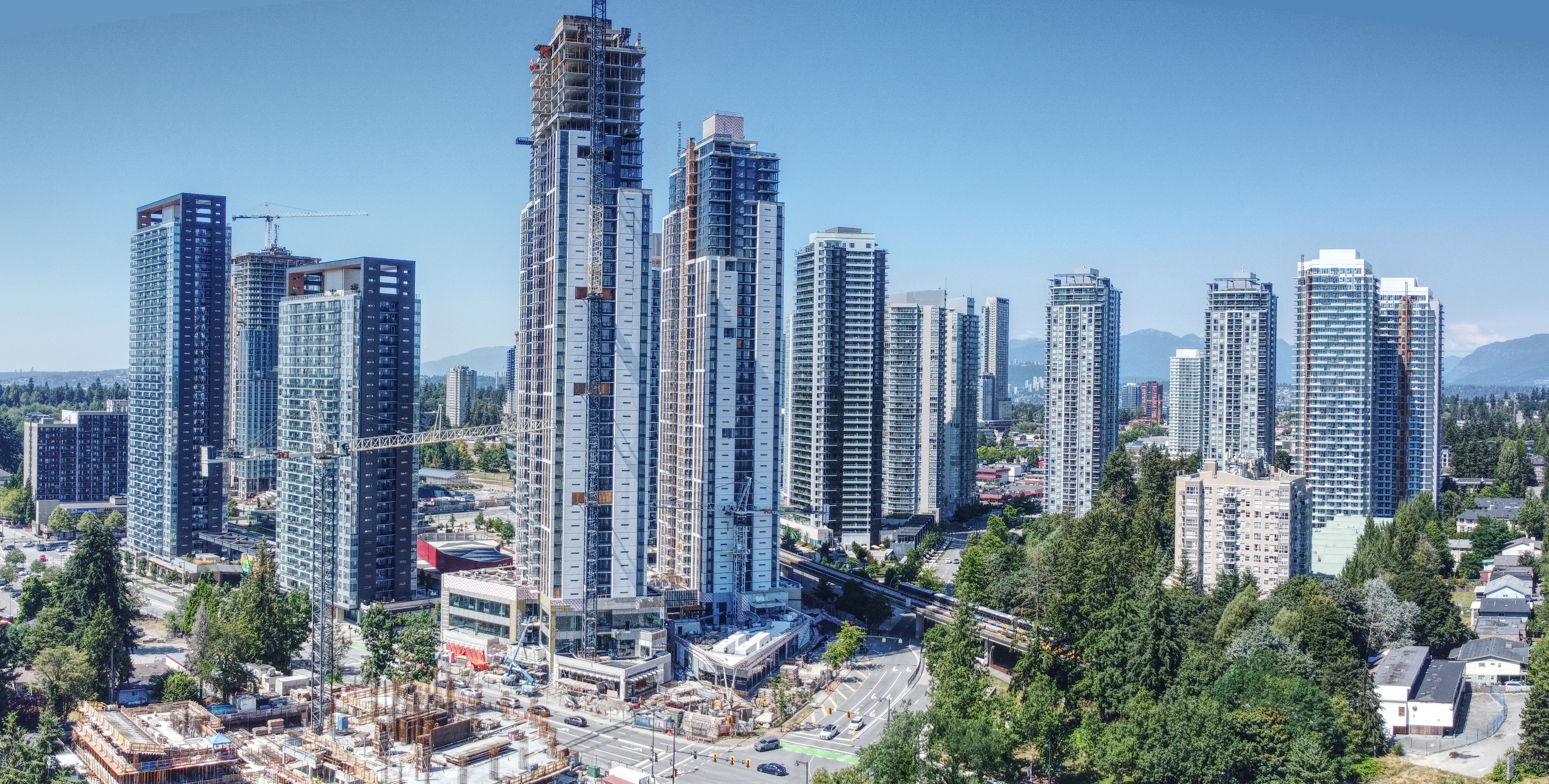
Skyscrapers surrounding King George station in Surrey City Centre

British Columbia, the third-most populous province in Canada, is home to the second highest number of skyscrapers and high-rises in the country, after Ontario. The vast majority of buildings taller than 100 metres (328 ft) in British Columbia are in Greater Vancouver, the third largest metropolitan area in Canada, with the remainder in Kelowna. There are nine cities in British Columbia with at least one building exceeding 100 m (328 ft) in height: Vancouver, Burnaby, Coquitlam, Delta, Langley, New Westminster, North Vancouver, Surrey, and Kelowna. Of these, Vancouver and Burnaby make up over half of all buildings in the list. The tallest building in the province is Two Gilmore Place, a 215.8 m (708 ft), 67-storey residential skyscraper in Burnaby.

The Legislative Building in Victoria, the capital of British Columbia, was the tallest building in the province when it was completed in 1897. As Vancouver subsequently overtook Victoria in population and economic importance, it would go on to have the majority of the tallest buildings in British Columbia during the 20th century. The first building in British Columbia to surpass 100 m (328 ft) in height was the Hotel Vancouver in 1939. High-rise development was slow before the mid-1960s. Notable office towers such as TD Tower and the Harbour Centre being added to Vancouver's skyline in the 1970s. Since the 1980s, Vancouver's urban planning has been highly influenced by the philosophy of Vancouverism, which encourages mixed-use development, narrow high-rise residential towers atop a commercial base, and reliance on public transit. In 2009, the first skyscraper exceeding 150 m (492 ft) in height in British Columbia, Living Shangri-La, opened in Vancouver. This reflected a uptick in the height of new developments in Vancouver, which has since completed six more such skyscrapers.

The 21st century also seen an increasing number of residential high-rises being built throughout the city's metropolitan area of Greater Vancouver (also known as Metro Vancouver). Between 2000 and 2025, the number of buildings taller than 100 m (328 ft) in Greater Vancouver quintupled from 31 to 175. This surge in condominium towers has been especially notable in Burnaby. Burnaby has less stringest height restrictions than Vancouver, where municipal regulations forbid any building from exceeding 200 meters (677 ft) in height above mean sea level in order to preserve sight lines out toward the Pacific Ranges. As a result, Burnaby has surpassed Vancouver in the number of skyscrapers taller than 150 m (492 ft). In 2024, Two Gilmore Place was completed in Burnaby, ending Vancouver's reign of having the tallest building in the province since 1910. A smaller high-rise boom has also taken place in Kelowna since the late 2010s, with the Okanagan Valley city having four buildings taller than 100 m (328 ft) by 2025.

In Greater Vancouver, the SkyTrain has encouraged transit-oriented development (TOD), with most high-rise developments occurring near a SkyTrain station. This has led to the creation of many urban cores throughout Greater Vancouver, each with a distinct cluster of tall buildings. The most prominent clusters outside downtown Vancouver are Metrotown and Brentwood in Burnaby, Coquitlam Town Centre and Burquitlam in Coquitlam, and Surrey City Centre in Surrey. Other clusters include Edmonds and Lougheed in Burnaby, Suter Brook Village in Port Moody, Marine Drive in southern Vancouver, Lonsdale in North Vancouver, Downtown and Sapperton in New Westminster, central Richmond, West Vancouver, and the unincorporated area of University Endowment Lands.

== History ==
Number of buildings by height in Greater Vancouver by the end of each year, based on the information in this article. Click on the legend to toggle a specific height on or off. View chart definition.

== Tallest buildings ==
This list ranks completed buildings in British Columbia that stand at least 100 m (328 ft) tall as of 2026, based on standard height measurement. This includes spires and architectural details but does not include antenna masts. The “Year” column indicates the year of completion. Buildings tied in height are sorted by year of completion with earlier buildings ranked first, and then alphabetically.

Was the tallest building in British Columbia upon completion

Rank	Name	Image	City	Height m (ft)	Floors	Year	Purpose	Notes
1	Two Gilmore Place		Burnaby 49°15′57″N 123°00′50″W	215.8 (708)	64	2024	Residential	Tallest building in Brentwood Park, in Burnaby, in Greater Vancouver, and in British Columbia. The second in the province to exceed 200 metres in height. Tallest building completed in Burnaby in the 2020s. Part of the three-tower Gilmore Place development.
2	Living Shangri-La		Vancouver 49°17′08″N 123°07′25″W	200.9 (659)	62	2009	Mixed-use	2nd tallest building in British Columbia and 39th tallest building in Canada. Contains a hotel on the first 15 floors and residential units on the rest of the tower. Will soon rebrand to the Hyatt Vancouver Downtown Alberni. Tallest building completed in Vancouver in the 2000s.
3	Paradox Hotel Vancouver		Vancouver 49°17′12″N 123°07′26″W	187.8 (616)	60	2016	Mixed-use	Tied with Altus in Burnaby for the third tallest building in British Columbia. Tallest building completed in Vancouver in the 2010s. Mixed-use hotel and residential building.
4	Solo District - Altus		Burnaby 49°15′58″N 123°00′13″W	187.8 (616)	49	2017	Mixed-use	Tallest building in Burnaby from 2017 to 2024. Mixed-use residential and hotel building. Tallest mixed-use building in Burnaby. Tied with the Paradox Hotel Vancouver for the third tallest building in British Columbia.
5	Brentwood One		Burnaby 49°16′04″N 123°00′09″W	186.2 (611)	56	2019	Residential	
6	Brentwood Two		Burnaby 49°16′00″N 123°00′03″W	186.2 (611)	56	2019	Residential	
7	Hillside East C at Concord Brentwood	–	Burnaby 49°15′54″N 122°59′39″W	182.9 (600)	55	2024	Residential	
8	Brentwood Three		Burnaby 49°16′00″N 122°59′58″W	182 (597)	55	2021	Residential	
9	The Butterfly		Vancouver 49°16′55″N 123°07′36″W	178.6 (586)	57	2024	Residential	Tallest building completed in Vancouver in the 2020s.
10	Pier West 1		New Westminster 49°12′04″N 122°54′32″W	178 (584)	53	2024	Residential	Tallest building in New Westminster.
11	Highline	–	Burnaby 49°13′28″N 123°00′10″W	177 (581)	53	2024	Mixed-use	Mixed-use residential and hotel building. Tallest building in Metrotown. Formerly called The Eclipse. The hotel component is known as Hyatt Place Metrotown.
12	6000 McKay Avenue	–	Burnaby 49°13′44″N 123°00′10″W	172 (564)	52	2022	Residential	Part of Station Square. Also known as Station Square Tower 5.
13	One Gilmore Place	–	Burnaby 49°15′55″N 123°00′50″W	171 (561)	51	2024	Residential	Part of the three-tower Gilmore Place development.
14	One Burrard Place	–	Vancouver 49°16′40″N 123°07′47″W	167.6 (550)	54	2021	Residential	
15	4670 Assembly Way	–	Burnaby 49°13′41″N 123°00′09″W	163 (535)	48	2018	Residential	Part of Station Square. Also known as Station Square Tower 2.
16	The Stack	–	Vancouver 49°17′14″N 123°07′22″W	162.3 (532)	38	2023	Office	Tallest office building in Vancouver.
17	567 Clarke + Como		Coquitlam 49°15′45″N 122°53′23″W	162.2 (532)	49	2021	Residential	Tallest building in Burquitlam and in Coquitlam. First building in Coquitlam to exceed 150 metres (492 ft) in height. Developed by Marcon, which is also behind the Marcon Elmwood project.
18	Highpoint	–	Coquitlam 49°15′35″N 122°53′30″W	160.8 (528)	50	2025	Residential	Also marketed as Highpoint by Ledingham McAllister.
19	The Private Residences at Hotel Georgia		Vancouver 49°17′02″N 123°07′07″W	158.5 (520)	48	2012	Mixed-use	
20	The City of Lougheed Tower One	–	Burnaby 49°15′01″N 122°53′40″W	158.5 (520)	55	2023	Residential	Tallest building in Lougheed. Part of the City of Lougheed development.
21	Hillside West B at Concord Brentwood	–	Burnaby 49°15′55″N 122°59′42″W	158 (518)	49	2022	Residential	
22	3 Civic Plaza		Surrey 49°11′26″N 122°50′53″W	157.3 (516)	52	2018	Mixed-use	Tallest building in Surrey since 2018. First building in Surrey to exceed 150 m (492 ft) in height. Tallest building completed in Surrey in the 2010s. Mixed-use residential and hotel building. The hotel is operated by Autograph Collection. Kwantlen Polytechnic University's Civic Plaza campus occupies the first five floors above the open lobby.
23	Sovereign		Burnaby 49°13′50″N 123°00′15″W	155.9 (511)	45	2014	Mixed-use	Tallest building in Burnaby from 2014 to 2017. Mixed-use residential and hotel building.
24	Myriad by Concert		Coquitlam 49°15′41″N 122°53′14″W	154.6 (507)	50	2025	Residential	Also known as Burquitlam Park 1.
25	Hillside East D at Concord Brentwood	–	Burnaby 49°15′53″N 122°59′35″W	154 (505)	45	2024	Residential	
26	Hillside West A at Concord Brentwood	–	Burnaby 49°15′56″N 122°59′45″W	153 (502)	44	2022	Residential	
27	Triomphe Residences	–	Burnaby 49°16′04″N 123°00′50″W	152.4 (500)	46	2020	Residential	
28	Vancouver House		Vancouver 49°16′30″N 123°07′52″W	150.3 (493)	49	2019	Residential	Features a top-heavy design that is unique in Vancouver.
29	Three Gilmore Place	–	Burnaby 49°15′57″N 123°00′46″W	150.3 (493)	43	2024	Residential	Part of the three-tower Gilmore Place development.
30	Smith & Farrow I	–	Coquitlam 49°15′39″N 122°53′33″W	150 (492)	46	2025	Residential	
31	One Wall Centre		Vancouver 49°16′50″N 123°07′32″W	149.8 (491)	47	2001	Mixed-use	This building is also known as the Sheraton Wall Centre. Tallest building in Vancouver from 2001 to 2009.
32	The Grand on King George	–	Surrey 49°11′52″N 122°50′48″W	149.5 (490)	46	2025	Residential	Tallest building completed in Surrey in the 2020s.
33	Solo District - Stratus		Burnaby 49°15′58″N 123°00′20″W	149.1 (489)	48	2015	Residential	
34	Shaw Tower		Vancouver 49°17′18″N 123°07′04″W	149.0 (488.8)	41	2004	Mixed-use	Also known as Rogers Tower.
35	The City of Lougheed Tower Two	–	Burnaby 49°14′59″N 122°53′40″W	147.9 (485)	48	2023	Residential	Part of the City of Lougheed development.
36	Harbour Centre		Vancouver 49°17′05″N 123°06′43″W	147.0 (482.3)	40	1977	Office	Tallest building in Vancouver from 1977 to 2001. Tallest office building in the city from 1977 to 2023. Tallest building completed in Vancouver in the 1970s.
37	Icon at Southgate City	–	Burnaby 49°12′37″N 122°56′56″W	145.4 (477)	46	2025	Residential	Tallest building in Edmonds.
38	Pier West 2		New Westminster 49°12′06″N 122°54′29″W	143.9 (472)	43	2024	Residential	
39	Solo District - Cirrus	–	Burnaby 49°15′55″N 123°00′19″W	143.6 (471)	39	2022	Residential	Also stylized as Cirrus at Solo District.
40	MNP Tower		Vancouver 49°17′15″N 123°07′04″W	143.1 (469)	36	2015	Office	Seeking Platinum LEED certification, will be Gold LEED at least.
41	The Melville		Vancouver 49°17′16″N 123°07′25″W	141.4 (464)	43	2007	Residential	Tallest all-residential tower in Vancouver. The building also has the tallest rooftop pool in the city.
42	Plaza Two at King George Hub	–	Surrey 49°10′52″N 122°50′33″W	141.4 (464)	44	2025	Residential	
43	Gold House North	–	Burnaby 49°13′35″N 123°00′24″W	141.2 (463)	41	2020	Residential	
44	Metroplace	–	Burnaby 49°13′31″N 123°00′15″W	141.1 (463)	46	2014	Residential	Redevelopment south of Metrotown Mall.
45	Royal Centre		Vancouver 49°17′07″N 123°07′18″W	141.0 (462.6)	37	1973	Office	Tallest building in Vancouver from 1973 to 1977. Also known as the RBC Tower or Royal Bank Tower.
46	Central Park House	–	Burnaby 49°13′49″N 123°00′33″W	140.8 (462)	42	2025	Residential	
47	6080 McKay Avenue	–	Burnaby 49°13′42″N 123°00′13″W	140.5 (461)	41	2021	Residential	Part of Station Square. Also known as Station Square Tower 4.
48	Fairmont Pacific Rim		Vancouver 49°17′17″N 123°06′59″W	140.3 (460)	44	2010	Mixed-use	
49	Bentall 5		Vancouver 49°17′09″N 123°07′05″W	140.1 (460)	34	2007	Office	Also known as B5.
50	Park Place		Vancouver 49°17′06″N 123°07′09″W	140.0 (459.3)	35	1984	Office	Largest office building in British Columbia by floor area, with 64,856 square metres (698,104 sq ft). Tallest building completed in Vancouver in the 1980s.
51	Granville Square		Vancouver 49°17′12″N 123°06′44″W	138.4 (454)	30	1973	Office	Also known as 200 Granville Square. The roof of the building features Vancouver Harbour Control Tower, the highest air traffic control tower in the world.
52	Sussex	–	Burnaby 49°13′45″N 122°59′53″W	138.4 (454)	41	2021	Residential	
53	The Standard Metrotown	–	Burnaby 49°13′29″N 123°00′37″W	138.4 (454)	43	2025	Residential	
54	Scotia Tower		Vancouver 49°16′54″N 123°07′04″W	138.0 (452.8)	34	1977	Office	
55	Four Bentall Centre		Vancouver 49°17′11″N 123°07′17″W	138.0 (452.8)	35	1981	Office	
56	6098 Station Street	–	Burnaby 49°13′39″N 123°00′11″W	138 (453)	38	2017	Residential	Part of Station Square. Also known as Station Square Tower 3.
57	The Eli at Water Street by the Park	–	Kelowna 49°53′05″N 119°29′50″W	137.8 (452)	42	2025	Residential	Tallest building in British Columbia outside of Greater Vancouver. Also known as Water Street by The Park Tower B. Part of the Water Street by the Park development.
58	Escala	–	Burnaby 49°16′06″N 123°00′49″W	137.2 (450)	42	2019	Residential	
59	Sun Towers 1	–	Burnaby 49°13′32″N 123°00′18″W	136.9 (449)	42	2022	Mixed-use	Mixed-use residential and office building.
60	Telus Garden Residential Tower		Vancouver 49°16′50″N 123°07′04″W	135.6 (445)	46	2016	Residential	LEED Platinum for Office Building and LEED Gold certification for Residential Tower as part of the new downtown Telus headquarters project.
61	Modello	–	Burnaby 49°13′37″N 123°00′28″W	134 (440)	37	2017	Residential	
62	One Central		Surrey 49°11′24″N 122°51′09″W	133.6 (438)	44	2023	Residential	
63	Alberni by Kengo Kuma	–	Vancouver 49°17′23″N 123°07′53″W	133.1 (437)	43	2023	Residential	
64	Akimbo	–	Burnaby 49°15′53″N 123°00′33″W	132.3 (434)	40	2023	Residential	
65	Plaza One at King George Hub	–	Surrey 49°10′54″N 122°50′34″W	130.9 (429)	41	2025	Residential	
66	King George Hub One		Surrey 49°10′51″N 122°50′42″W	130.7 (429)	40	2021	Residential	
67	Jinju by Anthem	–	Coquitlam 49°15′33″N 122°53′24″W	130.6 (428)	42	2025	Residential	
68	MThree		Coquitlam 49°16′55″N 122°47′38″W	129.8 (426)	48	2016	Residential	Tallest building in Coquitlam from 2016 to 2021.
69	Peter Wall Mansion & Residences	–	Vancouver 49°16′28″N 123°07′33″W	127.3 (418)	43	2017	Residential	Also known as 1300 Richards Street.
70	TD Tower		Vancouver 49°16′58″N 123°07′09″W	127.1 (417)	30	1972	Office	This building is also known as the Toronto Dominion Tower. Briefly the tallest building in Vancouver from 1972 to 1973.
71	Silver	–	Burnaby 49°13′33″N 123°00′21″W	127 (417)	38	2015	Residential	
72	Capitol Residences		Vancouver 49°16′50″N 123°07′11″W	126.2 (414)	43	2011	Residential	
73	Patina		Vancouver 49°16′56″N 123°07′34″W	126.2 (414)	42	2011	Residential	
74	Sophora on the Park	–	Coquitlam 49°16′55″N 122°47′28″W	125.5 (412)	40	2023	Residential	
75	The Charleson	–	Vancouver 49°16′26″N 123°07′37″W	125.0 (410)	42	2018	Residential	
76	Fulton House	–	Burnaby 49°15′46″N 123°00′30″W	125 (410)	41	2020	Residential	
77	The Stories at South Granville Station	–	Vancouver 49°15′50″N 123°08′17″W	125 (410)	39	2025	Residential	
78	Telford on the Walk	–	Burnaby 49°13′28″N 123°00′17″W	124.5 (408)	40	2024	Residential	
79	Park Boulevard		Surrey 49°10′58″N 122°50′37″W	124 (407)	42	2021	Residential	
80	The Mark		Vancouver 49°16′29″N 123°07′39″W	123.4 (405)	41	2013	Residential	
81	B6	–	Vancouver 49°17′14″N 123°07′13″W	123 (404)	31	2024	Office	Also known as Bentall 6.
82	Waterfall at Lumina Brentwood	–	Burnaby 49°15′48″N 122°59′56″W	122.9 (403)	38	2020	Residential	
83	Eclipse at Lumina Brentwood	–	Burnaby 49°15′45″N 122°59′57″W	122.9 (403)	34	2024	Residential	
84	Vancouver Centre II	–	Vancouver 49°16′53″N 123°07′06″W	122.8 (403)	33	2023	Office	
85	Woodward's 43		Vancouver 49°16′59″N 123°06′29″W	122.3 (401)	41	2010	Residential	This building is also known as W43 or the W Building.
86	Three Bentall Centre		Vancouver 49°17′10″N 123°07′12″W	121.9 (400)	32	1974	Office	Also known as the Bank of Montreal Tower.
87	Meridian	–	Coquitlam 49°15′33″N 122°53′31″W	121.3 (398)	38	2024	Residential	
88	Park Avenue West	–	Surrey 49°11′02″N 122°50′33″W	121 (397) (Note: Sources do not state the exact height of this building. This figure was determined using Google Earth by subtracting the altitude of the building's lowest main pedestrian open-air entrance from its highest architectural point.)	41	2017	Residential	Tallest building in Surrey briefly from 2017 to 2018.
89	The Park Metrotown	–	Burnaby 49°13′24″N 122°59′38″W	120.1 (394)	39	2017	Residential	One of the buildings east of Bonsor Recreation Center.
90	Aqua Tower at Plaza 88	–	New Westminster 49°12′02″N 122°54′54″W	119.2 (391)	40	2019	Residential	
91	Parkway I	–	Surrey 49°11′32″N 122°50′51″W	119.1 (391)	38	2026	Residential	
92	Central City		Surrey 49°11′16″N 122°50′59″W	119 (390)	37	2003	Office	Tallest building in Surrey from 2003 to 2017. Tallest building completed in Surrey in the 2000s. First building in Surrey to exceed 100 metres (328 ft) in height.
93	The Pacific in Vancouver	–	Vancouver 49°16′35″N 123°07′51″W	118.7 (389)	39	2021	Residential	
94	Jameson House		Vancouver 49°17′10″N 123°06′56″W	118.6 (389)	38	2011	Mixed-use	
95	The Ritz Coal Harbour		Vancouver 49°17′18″N 123°07′27″W	118.3 (388)	37	2008	Residential	
96	Lougheed Heights Tower 1	–	Coquitlam 49°15′26″N 122°53′29″W	117.8 (386)	38	2020	Residential	Listed as Lougheed Heights II on SkyscraperPage.
97	The City of Lougheed Tower Three	–	Burnaby 49°14′58″N 122°53′36″W	117.4 (385)	37	2023	Residential	Part of the City of Lougheed development.
98	320 Granville	–	Vancouver 49°17′08″N 123°06′46″W	117.3 (385)	30	2023	Office	
99	KC2 at King's Crossing	–	Burnaby 49°13′08″N 122°57′01″W	117.1 (384)	36	2020	Residential	
100	West One		Vancouver 49°16′22″N 123°07′37″W	117 (384)	38	2002	Residential	This building is also known as Beach Crescent - West One.
101	Delta Rise	–	Delta 49°08′56″N 122°53′30″W	116.8 (383)	37	2017	Residential	Tallest building in Delta.
102	Cathedral Place		Vancouver 49°17′03″N 123°07′12″W	116.4 (382)	23	1991	Office	Tallest building completed in Vancouver in the 1990s.
103	ONE Water Street East		Kelowna 49°53′39″N 119°29′39″W	116.2 (381)	36	2021	Residential	Tallest building in Kelowna from 2021 to 2025. Part of the One Water Street development. Also known as One Water Street I. First building in Kelowna to exceed 100 m (328 ft) in height.
104	Park Avenue East	–	Surrey 49°11′02″N 122°50′30″W	116 (379)	40	2017	Residential	
105	The Met 2	–	Burnaby 49°13′28″N 122°59′38″W	115.9 (380)	38	2017	Residential	One of The Met twin towers.
106	Park George I	–	Surrey 49°11′01″N 122°50′28″W	115.4 (379)	39	2024	Residential	
107	1335 Howe	–	Vancouver 49°16′35″N 123°07′47″W	115.3 (378)	40	2022	Residential	
108	Vittorio	–	Burnaby 49°13′22″N 122°59′33″W	114.9 (377)	38	2020	Residential	
109	Comma King George	–	Surrey 49°10′41″N 122°50′40″W	114.9 (377)	39	2025	Residential	
110	Chancellor		Burnaby 49°13′29″N 122°59′42″W	114.6 (376)	37	2013	Residential	Tallest building in Burnaby briefly from 2013 to 2014.
111	Prime at the Plaza		Surrey 49°11′24″N 122°51′01″W	114.4 (375)	37	2019	Residential	
112	Marriott Pinnacle Hotel		Vancouver 49°17′16″N 123°07′14″W	114.3 (375)	35	2000	Mixed-use	
113	Oasis		Coquitlam 49°16′55″N 122°47′55″W	114.3 (375)	38	2013	Residential	Tallest building in Coquitlam from 2013 to 2016.
114	The Exchange	–	Vancouver 49°17′09″N 123°06′57″W	114.3 (375)	31	2017	Office	
115	Tate on Howe	–	Vancouver 49°16′38″N 123°07′43″W	114.3 (375)	40	2019	Residential	
116	Polaris at Metrotown	–	Burnaby 49°13′20″N 122°59′36″W	114.3 (375)	36	2021	Residential	
117	University District South Tower		Surrey 49°11′32″N 122°51′02″W	113.9 (374)	37	2023	Residential	
118	Evolve	–	Surrey 49°11′25″N 122°51′13″W	113.7 (373)	36	2019	Residential	
119	West Pender Place 1		Vancouver 49°17′24″N 123°07′42″W	112.8 (370)	36	2011	Residential	
120	1123 Westwood	–	Coquitlam 49°16′43″N 122°47′22″W	112.8 (370)	36	2015	Residential	
121	Riviera on the Park	–	Burnaby 49°13′30″N 122°59′35″W	112.5 (369)	35	2025	Residential	
122	Metro Tower II		Burnaby 49°13′32″N 123°00′03″W	111.3 (365)	30	1991	Office	Tallest building in Burnaby from 1991 to 2013. Tallest office building in Burnaby. Also written as Metrotower II.
123	Sheraton Wall Centre Hotel - West Tower		Vancouver 49°16′49″N 123°07′38″W	110.9 (364)	35	1994	Hotel	
124	Midori	–	Burnaby 49°13′24″N 122°59′32″W	110.7 (363)	37	2018	Residential	
125	Hotel Vancouver		Vancouver 49°17′02″N 123°07′15″W	110.6 (363)	17	1939	Hotel	Tallest building in Vancouver from 1939 to 1972. Tallest building completed in Vancouver in the 1930s.
126	Broadview	–	Burnaby 49°13′46″N 123°00′26″W	110.1 (361)	35	2025	Residential	
127	One Park Place		Surrey 49°11′02″N 122°50′37″W	110 (361)	36	2011	Residential	
128	Two Park Place		Surrey 49°11′01″N 122°50′37″W	110 (361)	36	2011	Residential	
129	The Towers of Latimer Heights II	–	Langley 49°09′30″N 122°39′56″W	109.5 (359)	34	2025	Residential	Tallest building in Langley.
130	Venus		Vancouver 49°17′16″N 123°07′32″W	109.4 (359)	34	2000	Residential	
131	Metro Tower III	–	Burnaby 49°13′31″N 123°00′04″W	109 (358)	27	2013	Office	Also written as Metrotower III.
132	The Line		Surrey 49°10′55″N 122°50′36″W	109 (358)	34	2021	Residential	Also marketed as The Line at King George Hub.
133	Hyatt Regency Vancouver		Vancouver 49°17′07″N 123°07′14″W	108.8 (357)	35	1973	Hotel	This building is also known as the Hyatt Regency Hotel or the Hyatt Regency Vancouver-Royal Centre.
134	601 West Hastings	–	Vancouver 49°17′06″N 123°06′46″W	108.8 (357)	25	2022	Office	
135	One Fifty Braid	–	New Westminster 49°13′52″N 122°53′06″W	108.7 (357)	34	2025	Residential	
136	Centrepoint	–	Burnaby 49°13′41″N 122°59′46″W	108.6 (356)	32	2008	Residential	
137	Levo I	–	Coquitlam 49°16′53″N 122°47′44″W	108.5 (356)	37	2009	Residential	Tallest building in Coquitlam from 2009 to 2013.
138	Park George II	–	Surrey 49°11′02″N 122°50′26″W	108.4 (356)	36	2024	Residential	
139	Artesia Metrotown	–	Burnaby 49°14′00″N 123°00′34″W	108.2 (355)	31	2025	Residential	
140	Residences on Georgia (West)		Vancouver 49°17′15″N 123°07′36″W	108 (354)	36	1998	Residential	
141	4688 Kingsway	–	Burnaby 49°13′44″N 123°00′06″W	108 (354)	35	2015	Residential	Part of Station Square. Also known as Station Square Tower 1.
142	Étoile Tower I	–	Burnaby 49°15′48″N 122°59′11″W	107.6 (353)	32	2021	Residential	
143	The Met	–	Burnaby 49°13′26″N 122°59′38″W	107.3 (352)	34	2015	Residential	
144	Aldynne in the Park	–	Burnaby 49°13′54″N 123°00′42″W	107.3 (352)	35	2017	Residential	
145	Marine Gateway North		Vancouver 49°12′36″N 123°07′00″W	107 (351)	30	2015	Residential	The first building in Vancouver exceeding 100 metres (328 ft) in height that is located outside of Downtown Vancouver.
146	The Pinnacle		Vancouver 49°16′41″N 123°07′11″W	106.1 (348)	36	1996	Residential	
147	Callisto		Vancouver 49°17′24″N 123°07′24″W	106.1 (348)	35	2004	Residential	
148	Dolce		Vancouver 49°16′46″N 123°07′10″W	106.1 (348)	31	2010	Residential	
149	Landmark 33		Vancouver 49°16′30″N 123°07′03″W	106 (348)	35	1998	Residential	Also known as Marina Pointe - Landmark 33.
150	Residences on Georgia (East)		Vancouver 49°17′13″N 123°07′33″W	106 (348)	36	1998	Residential	
151	Park Place at Central City	–	Surrey 49°11′02″N 122°50′41″W	106 (348)	36	2008	Residential	Also known as Infinity.
152	Obelisk		Coquitlam 49°16′53″N 122°47′32″W	105.2 (345)	35	2008	Residential	Tallest building in Coquitlam briefly from 2008 to 2009. First building in Coquitlam to exceed 100 metres (328 ft) in height.
153	Two Harbour Green		Vancouver 49°17′20″N 123°07′12″W	105.1 (345)	31	2008	Residential	
154	Board of Trade Building		Vancouver 49°17′19″N 123°07′18″W	104.2 (342)	27	1968	Office	Also known as 1177 West Hastings at Columbia Centre. Tallest building completed in Vancouver in the 1960s.
155	Oceanic Plaza		Vancouver 49°17′15″N 123°07′08″W	104.2 (342)	26	1977	Office	
156	Bertram at Bernard Block		Kelowna 49°53′12″N 119°29′26″W	104.1 (342)	34	2024	Residential	Part of the Bernard Block development.
157	Apex at Seylynn Village	–	North Vancouver 49°18′42″N 123°01′56″W	104 (341)	32	2024	Residential	Tallest building in Northern Vancouver.
158	Marinus @ Plaza 88	–	New Westminster 49°12′05″N 122°54′48″W	103.7 (340)	34	2009	Residential	
159	Arthur Erickson Place		Vancouver 49°17′09″N 123°07′20″W	103.6 (340)	27	1968	Office	Originally known as the MacMillan Bloedel Building.
160	Metro Tower I		Burnaby 49°13′34″N 123°00′05″W	103.6 (340)	28	1989	Office	Tallest building in Burnaby from 1989 to 1991. Also written as Metrotower I.
161	Ovation at the City of New Westminster	–	New Westminster 49°12′06″N 122°54′50″W	103.3 (339)	32	2024	Residential	
162	Quay West Tower I		Vancouver 49°16′24″N 123°06′59″W	103 (338)	35	2002	Residential	This building is also known as Marina Crescent - Quay West I or QuayWest I at Concord Pacific Place.
163	Ashley Mar III	–	Vancouver 49°12′31″N 123°07′04″W	103 (338)	31	2025	Residential	
164	Flamingo One	–	Surrey 49°11′52″N 122°50′36″W	103 (338)	35	2025	Residential	
165	Elan		Vancouver 49°16′34″N 123°07′35″W	102.7 (337)	34	2008	Residential	
166	King's Crossing One	–	Burnaby 49°13′07″N 122°56′58″W	102.4 (336)	31	2020	Residential	
167	Hensley	–	Coquitlam 49°14′53″N 122°53′24″W	102.4 (336)	33	2022	Residential	Tallest building in Coquitlam outside of both Coquitlam Town Centre and Burquitlam.
168	Classico	–	Vancouver 49°17′20″N 123°07′35″W	102.1 (335)	37	2003	Residential	
169	Ultra	–	Surrey 49°11′23″N 122°51′12″W	102 (335)	36	2013	Residential	
170	618 Carnarvon Street	–	New Westminster 49°12′13″N 122°54′33″W	102 (335)	33	2023	Residential	
171	Aquilini Centre West	–	Vancouver 49°16′40″N 123°06′35″W	101.5 (333)	25	2015	Residential	
172	FortisBC Centre		Vancouver 49°17′10″N 123°07′23″W	101.2 (332)	24	1992	Office	Formerly known as the Terasen Centre and was previously the site of the Rayonier Building (originally known as the Alaska White Pine Building) from 1954 to 1990.
173	Water Street by the Park II	–	Kelowna 49°53′05″N 119°29′53″W	100.8 (331)	28	2025	Residential	Also known as Water Street on the Park Tower A. Part of the Water Street by the Park development.
174	Paris Place		Vancouver 49°16′49″N 123°06′30″W	100.5 (330)	33	1995	Residential	
175	HSBC Building		Vancouver 49°17′02″N 123°07′09″W	100.5 (330)	23	1987	Office	
176	Canaccord Tower		Vancouver 49°17′01″N 123°07′01″W	100.3 (329)	24	1981	Office	This building is also known as Canaccord Place or 609 Granville at Pacific Centre.
177	Coast Plaza Hotel		Vancouver 49°17′19″N 123°08′19″W	100.2 (329)	32	1969	Hotel	
178	Carmana Plaza		Vancouver 49°17′09″N 123°07′30″W	100 (328)	34	1999	Residential	
179	Guinness Tower		Vancouver 49°17′16″N 123°07′06″W	100 (328)	25	1969	Residential	
180	Hudson	–	Vancouver 49°17′00″N 123°06′59″W	100 (328)	34	2006	Residential	

== Cities with the most skyscrapers ==
Every city in British Columbia with at least one building taller than 100 m (328 ft) is part of Greater Vancouver, with the exception of Kelowna.

City	100 m (328 ft)+	150 m (492 ft)+	200 m (656 ft)+
Vancouver	72	7	1
Burnaby	57	17	1
Surrey	23	1	–
Coquitlam	14	4	–
New Westminster	7	1	–
Delta	1	–	–
Langley	1	–	–
North Vancouver	1	–	–
Greater Vancouver (total)	176	30	2
Kelowna	4	–	–
Greater Kelowna (total)	4	–	–

== Tallest demolished ==
This table lists buildings in British Columbia that were demolished or destroyed and at one time stood at least 100 metres (328 ft) in height.

Name	Image	Height m (ft)	Floors	Year completed	Year demolished	Notes
Empire Landmark Hotel		120.1 (394)	42	1973	2019	This building was the tallest free standing hotel in the city. This building was often referred to by its original name, the Sheraton Landmark. The hotel and its restaurant closed on September 30, 2017, and the building was demolished, floor by floor between March 2018 and May 2019.

== Timeline of tallest buildings ==
This is a list of buildings that in the past held the title of tallest building in British Columbia.

Name	Image	City	Years as tallest	Height m (ft)	Floors	Reference
Legislative Building		Victoria	1897–1910	44.2 (145)	5	
Dominion Building		Vancouver	1910–1912	53.3 (175)	14	
Sun Tower		Vancouver	1912–1914	84.1 (276)	17	
Marine Building		Vancouver	1930–1939	98 (322)	21	
Hotel Vancouver		Vancouver	1939–1972	111 (364)	17	
TD Tower		Vancouver	1972–1973	127.1 (417)	30	
Royal Centre		Vancouver	1973–1977	141.0 (462.6)	37	
Harbour Centre		Vancouver	1977–2001	147.0 (482.3)	28	
One Wall Centre		Vancouver	2001–2008	149.8 (491)	48	
Living Shangri-La		Vancouver	2008–2024	200.9 (659)	62	
Two Gilmore Place		Burnaby	2024–present	215.8 (708)	64	

== See also ==
- List of tallest buildings in Vancouver
- List of tallest buildings in Burnaby
- List of tallest buildings in Kelowna
- List of tallest buildings in Surrey, British Columbia
- List of tallest buildings in Canada
- Canadian architecture
- Canadian Centre for Architecture
- Society of Architectural Historians
