= Two Gilmore Place =

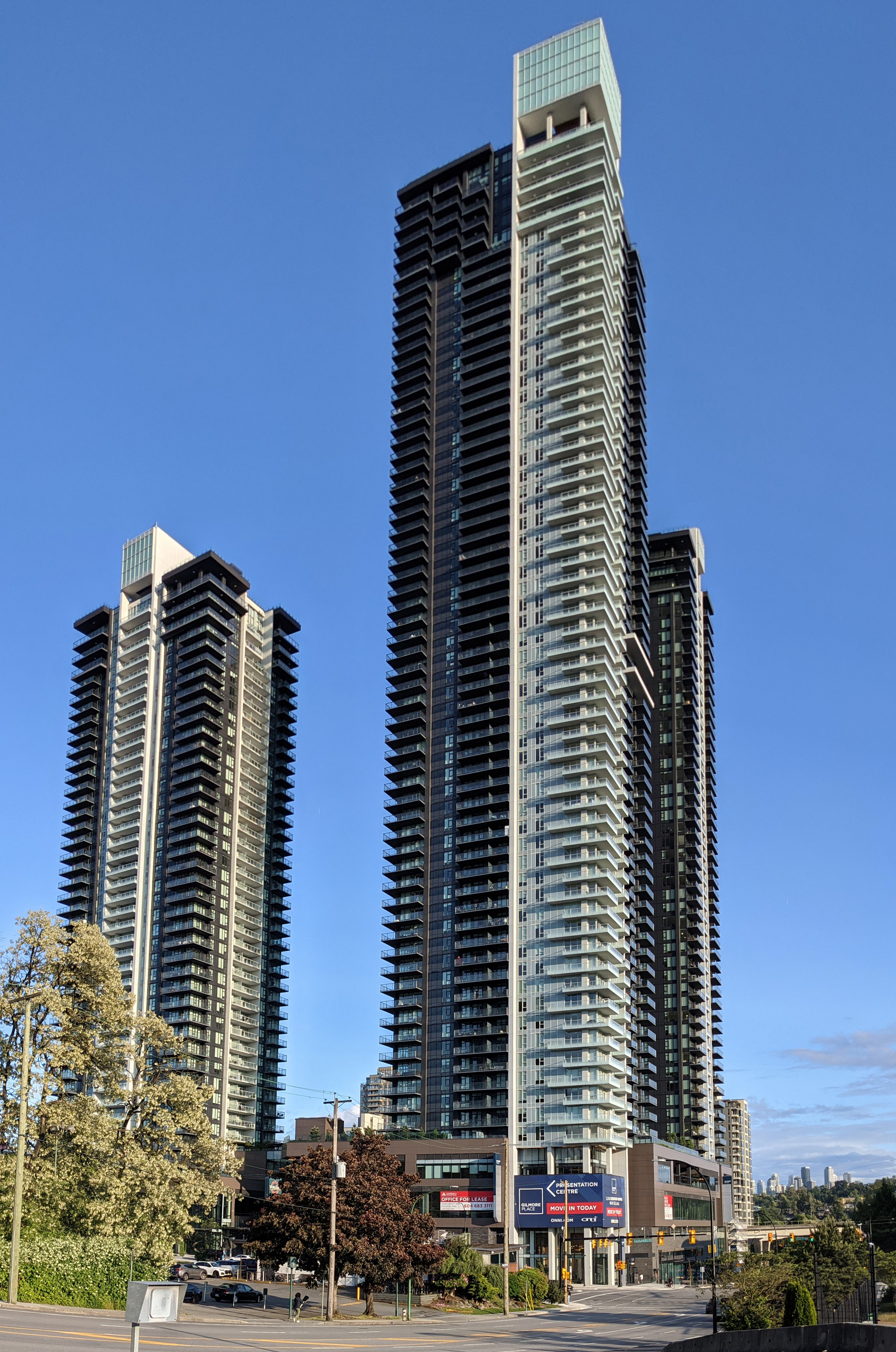
- Two Gilmore Place in 2025
- Interactive map of the Two Gilmore Place area

General information
- Status: Completed
- Type: Residential/retail
- Location: 2108 Gilmore Avenue; Burnaby, British Columbia, Canada
- Coordinates: 49°15′56.2″N 123°00′49.0″W
- Construction started: 2021
- Completed: 2024

Height
- Architectural: 215.8 metres (708 ft)

Technical details
- Floor count: 64

Design and construction
- Developer: Onni Group

Other information
- Number of units: 643 apartments

Website
- gilmoreplace.com

Two Gilmore Place is a skyscraper in Burnaby, British Columbia, Canada, that was completed in 2024. It is located at the intersection of Lougheed Highway and Gilmore Avenue, immediately north of Gilmore station. Two Gilmore Place is the tallest building in British Columbia at 215.8 metres (708 ft) tall.

== History and development ==
Two Gilmore Place is part of the larger mixed-use development "Gilmore Place". Construction of the complex began in 2021.

== See also ==
- List of tallest buildings in Canada
- List of tallest buildings in British Columbia
- List of tallest buildings in Burnaby
