= Sovereign (building) =

Skyscraper in Metrotown, Burnaby

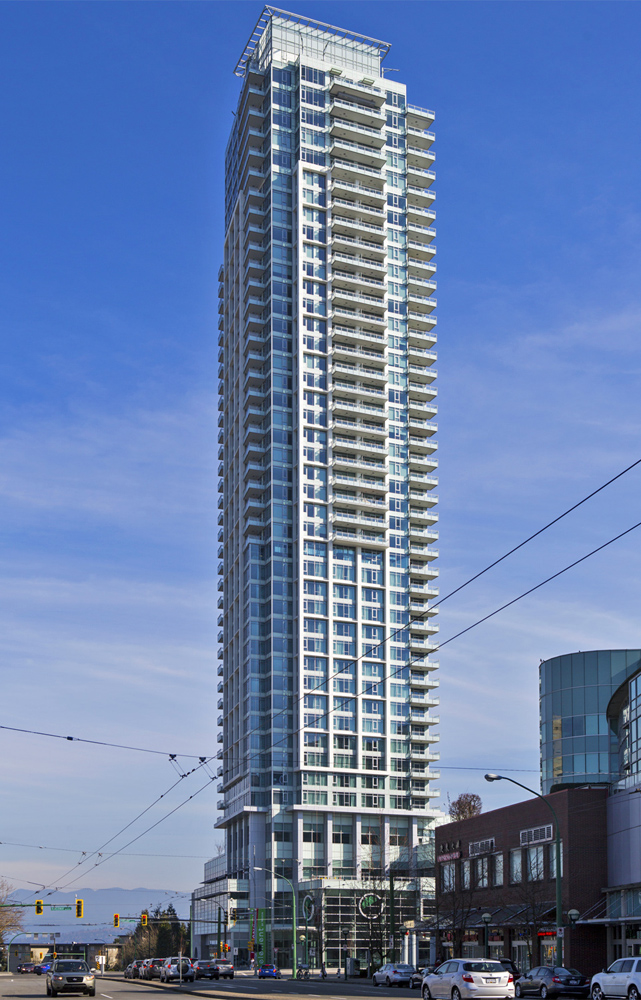
- Interactive map of the Sovereign area

General information
- Status: Completed
- Type: Mixed-use: Residential, retail, hotel
- Architectural style: Modern
- Location: 4509 Kingsway; Burnaby, British Columbia, Canada
- Coordinates: 49.2304°N 123.0040°W
- Construction started: 2011
- Completed: 2014
- Opened: 2014

Height
- Architectural: 155.9 metres (511 ft)

Technical details
- Floor count: 45

Design and construction
- Architect: Chris Dikeakos
- Developer: Bosa Properties

Other information
- Number of units: 202 apartments and 169 hotel rooms

Sovereign is a skyscraper in Metrotown, Burnaby, British Columbia, Canada, designed and built by Bosa Properties Inc. on Willingdon Avenue and Kingsway. The building is located northwest of Metrotown and stands at 511 feet (156 m) tall. It has 45 storeys which include hotel and residence space.

Sovereign has 202 luxury residences in the upper part of the structure and 169 hotel rooms in the lower part. It also includes 100,000 square feet (9,300 m^{2}) of retail space. It previously held the title of the tallest building in Burnaby, but has been surpassed by Altus in the Solo District, with the phase two building being 616 feet (188 m) tall.

== See also ==
- List of tallest buildings in Burnaby
- List of tallest buildings in British Columbia
