= The Amazing Brentwood =

Shopping mall in Burnaby, Canada

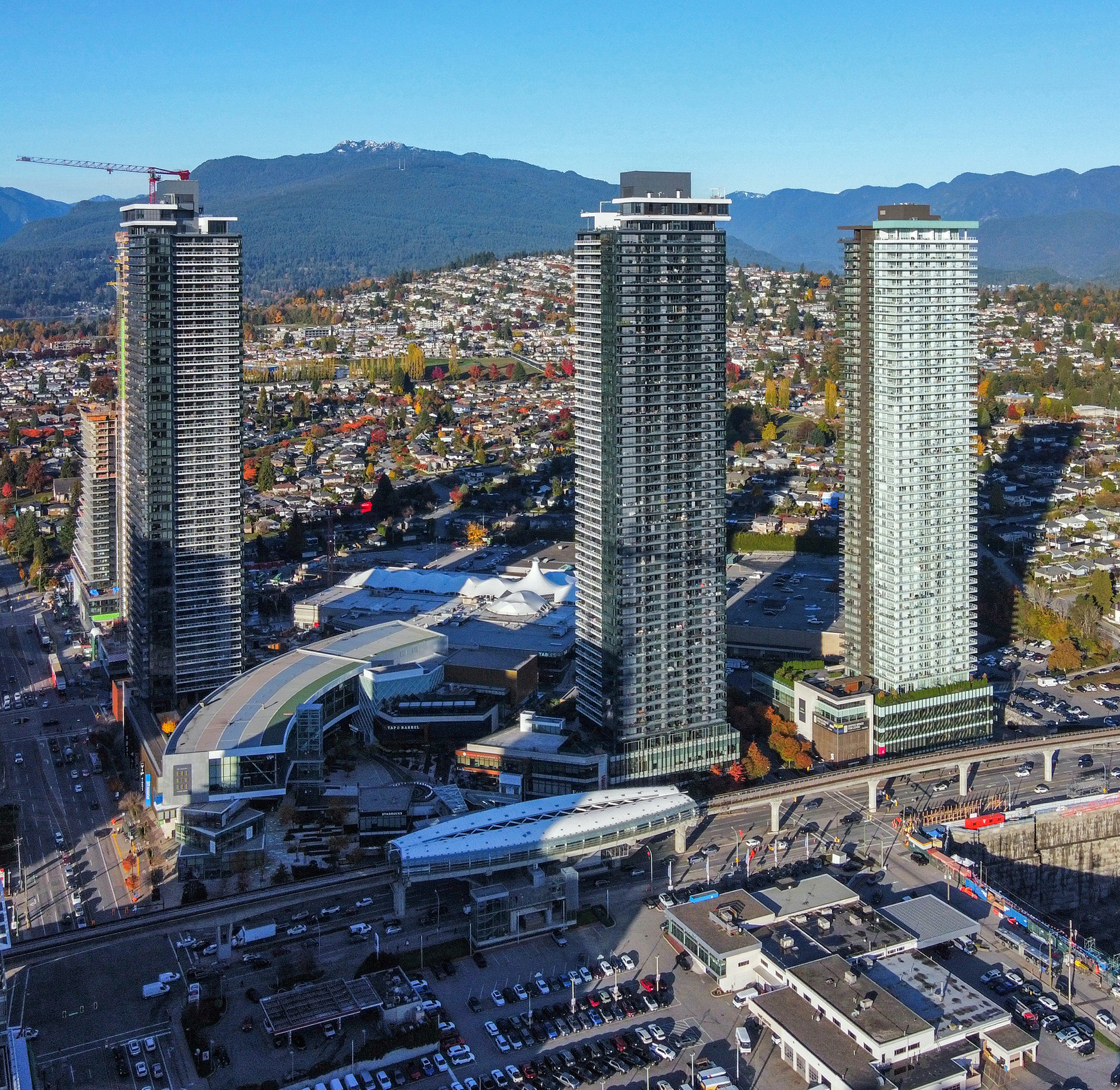
- Northeast view of the Amazing Brentwood
- Coordinates: 49.268113°N 123.000205°W
- Address: 4567 Lougheed Hwy, Burnaby, British Columbia, Canada V5C 3Z6
- Opened: August 16, 1961; 65 years ago
- Closed: 2025 (indoor mall)
- Manager: Shape Property Management Corp.
- Owner: Shape Properties Corp.
- Num. of stores: 85+
- Num. of anchor tenants: 3 (1 open, 2 vacant)
- Floors: 2 (3 in former Sears)
- Public transit: Brentwood Town Centre station; Bus
- Website: theamazingbrentwood.com

The Amazing Brentwood (previously Brentwood Town Centre and also referred to as Brentwood Mall) is a shopping mall in Burnaby, British Columbia, Canada. It is located in the Brentwood Park area of North Burnaby, at the intersection of Willingdon Avenue and Lougheed Highway, approximately 1.5 kilometres (0.9 mi) from the city of Vancouver.

== History ==
The Brentwood Park neighbourhood was developed in the early 1950s with 572 homes and plans for a shopping centre. The site was pieced together from municipal property and 14 private owners and acquired by Webb and Knapp Canada in 1957; several retailers had already purchased properties on the site and agreed to an integrated mall plan. Plans for the shopping centre were formally announced in January 1959 and approved by the municipal council the following month. Construction on the $10 million project began later that year.

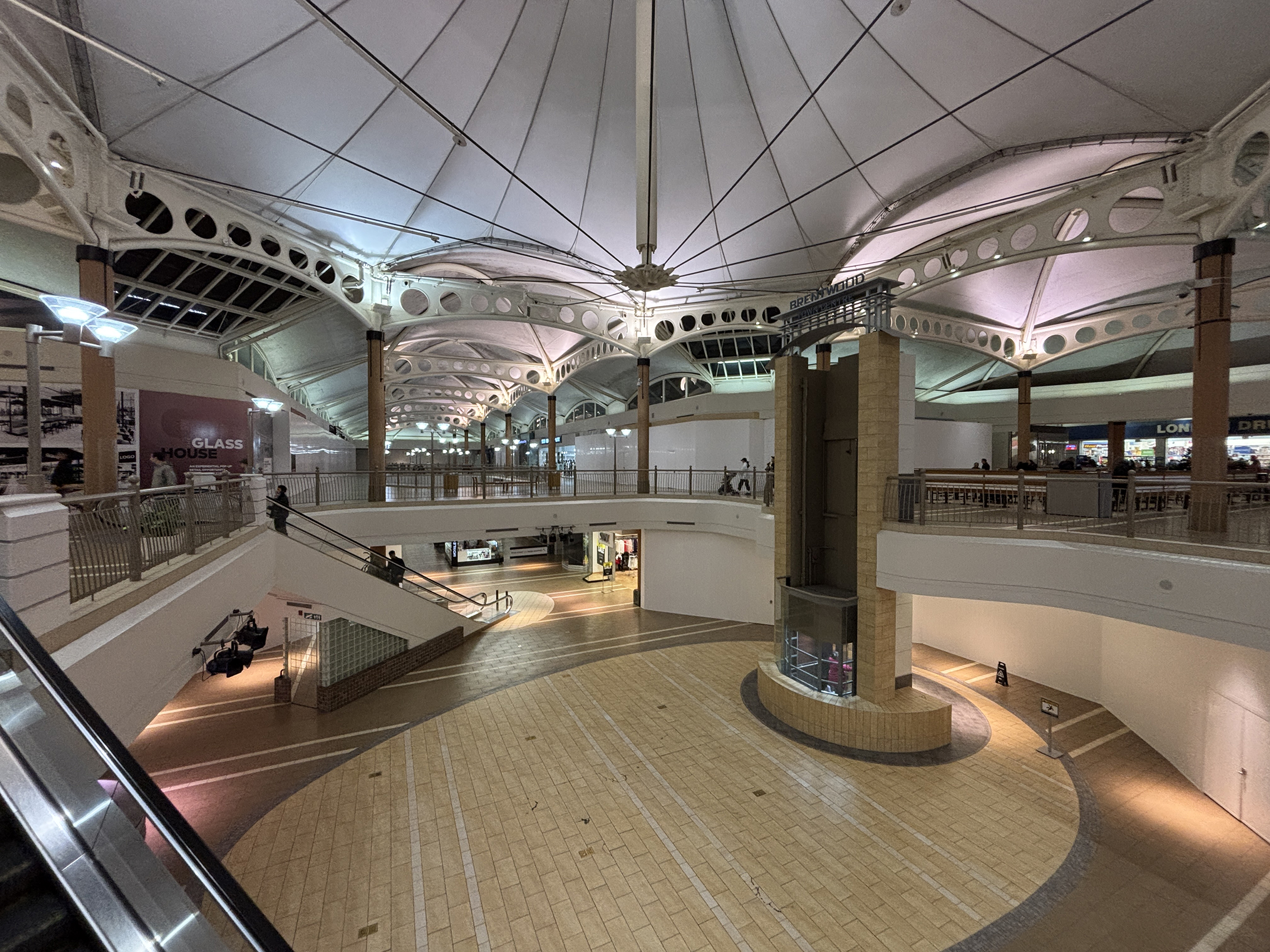
Brentwood Mall atrium

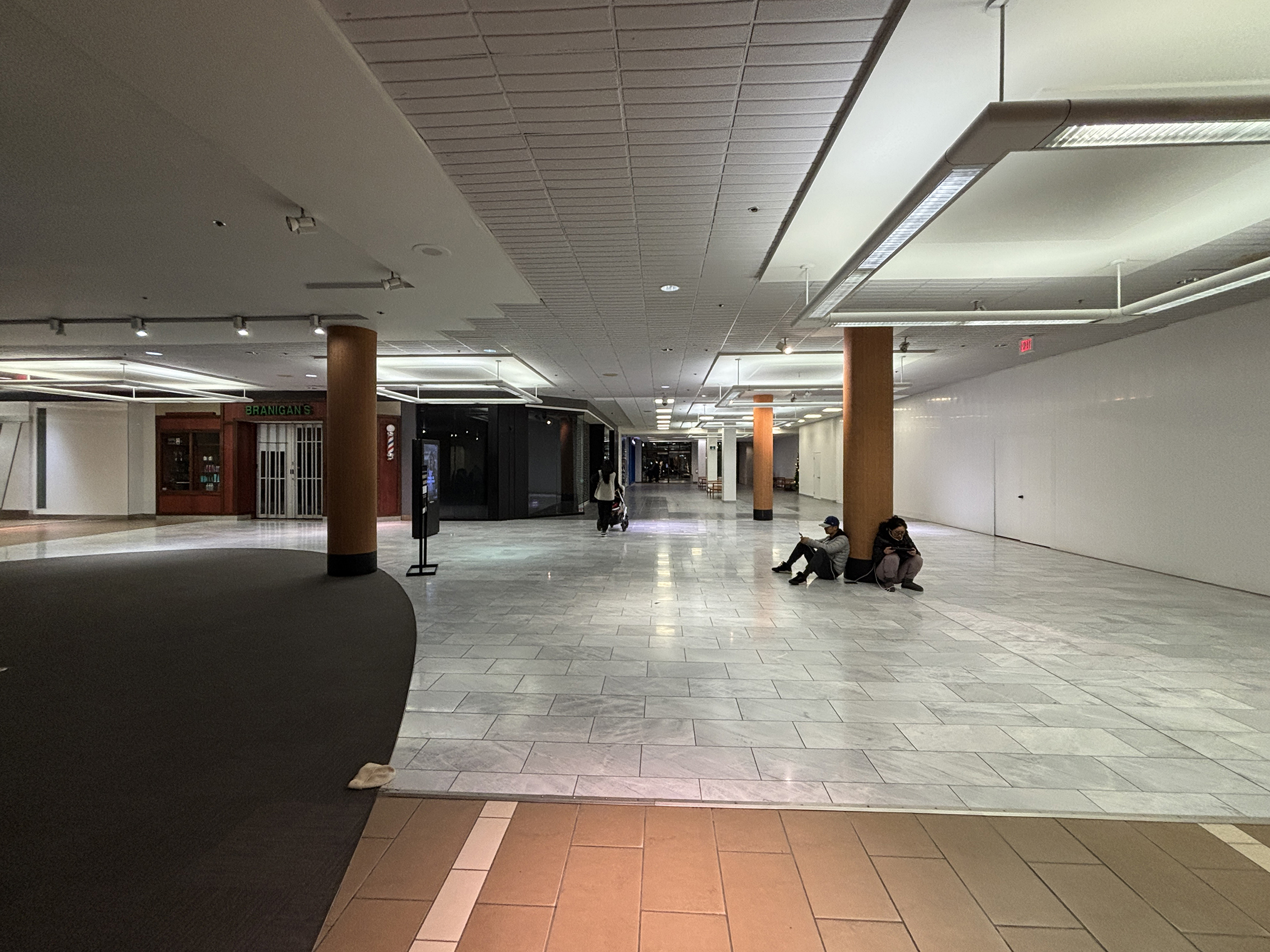
Level 1 in 2024

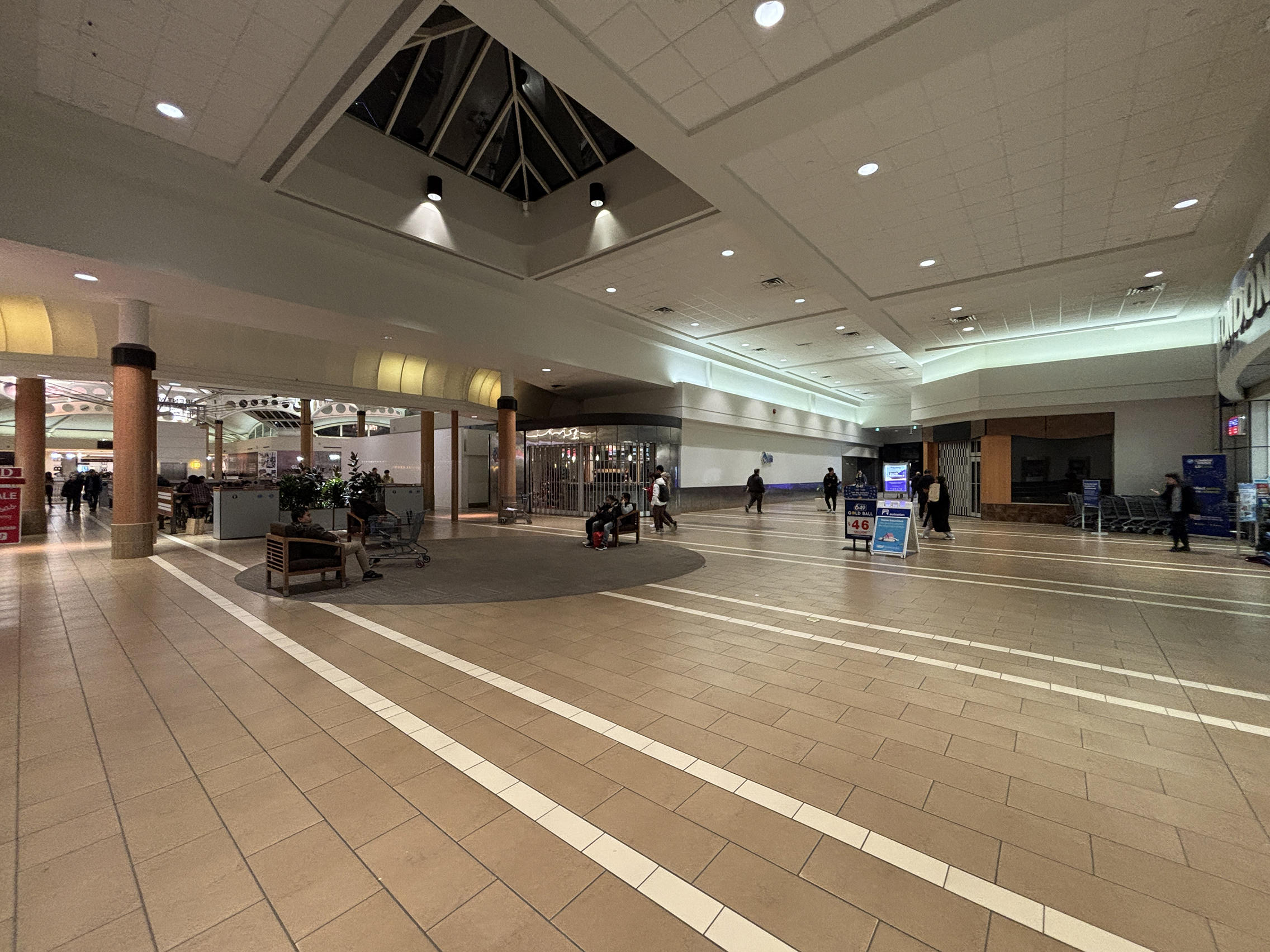
Level 2 in 2024

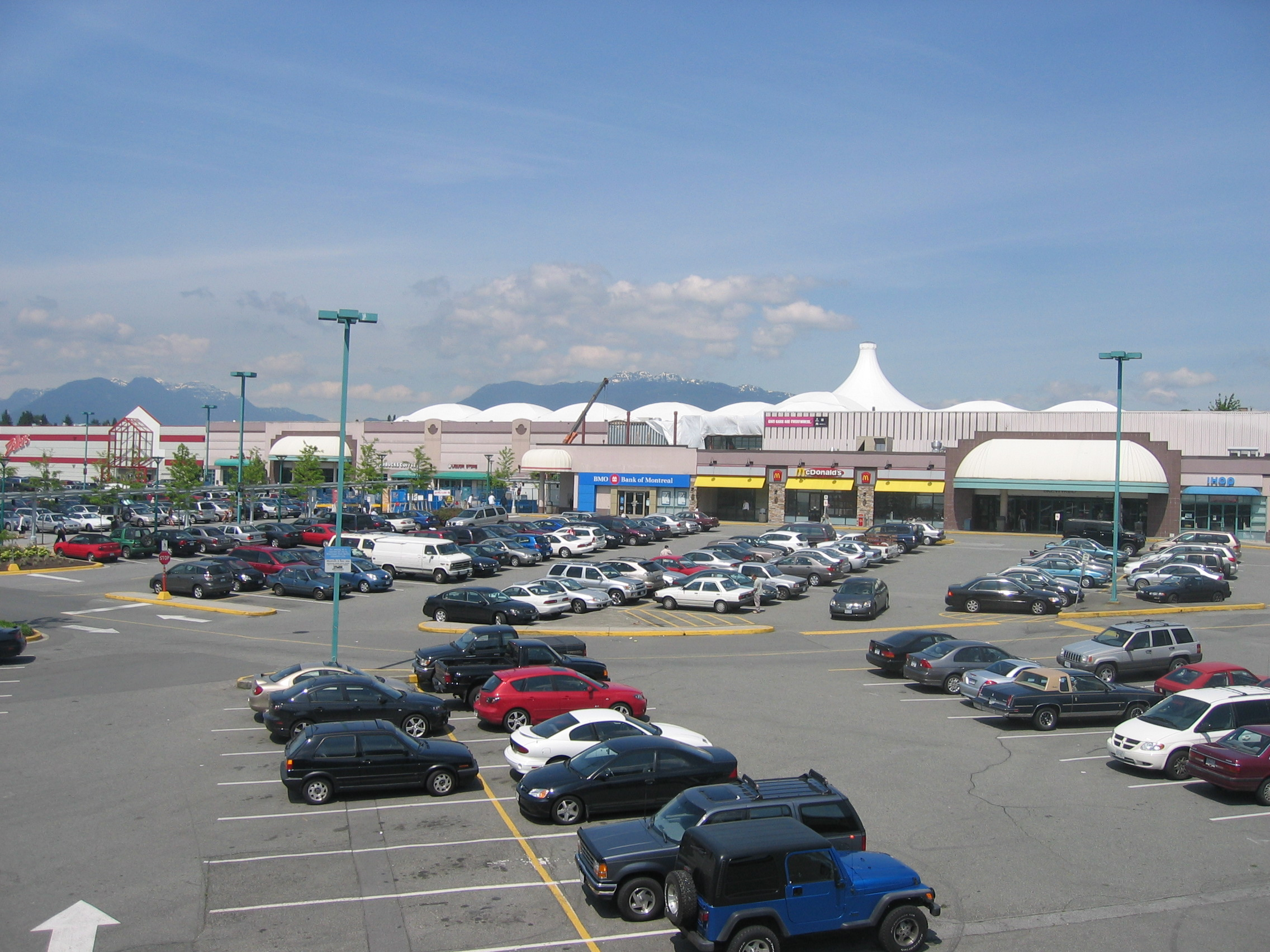
Brentwood Town Centre in 2006

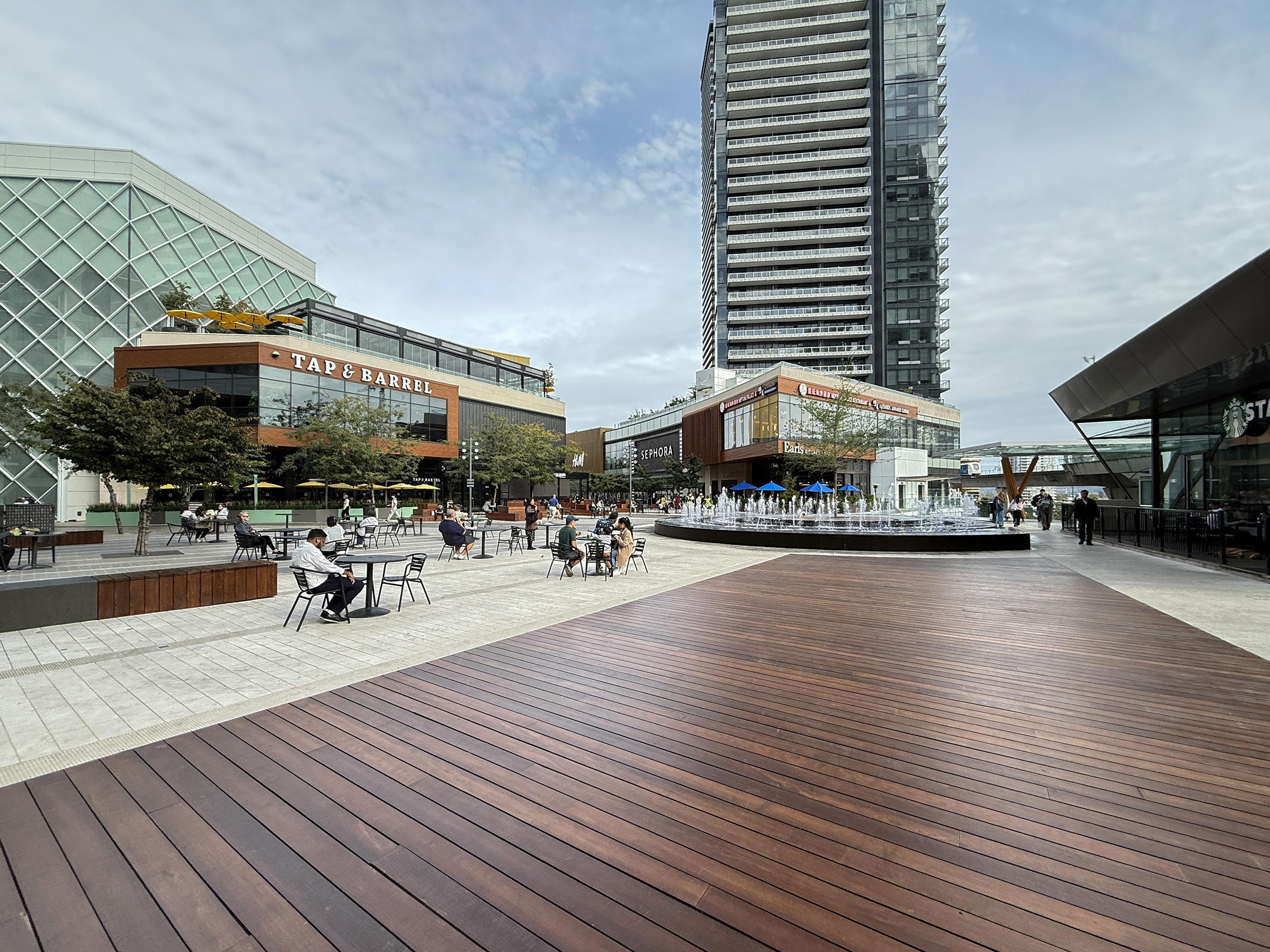
Brentwood Plaza near SkyTrain station

The Brentwood Shopping Centre opened on August 16, 1961, with 10,000 visitors on the first day causing traffic congestion on the Lougheed Highway. The mall had 50 stores, a total of 37,600 square metres (405,000 sq ft) of retail space, 2,400 parking spaces, and covered 12 hectares (30 acres)—making it the largest in Canada. Its anchors included Eaton's, Loblaws (their first store in British Columbia), and Zellers; other stores were spread between an enclosed area and outdoor strip mall.

The outdoor portion was later converted to an enclosed space, while a second level was added in the 1980s.

The mall was closed in May 2025 and will be entirely demolished.

=== Redevelopment ===
In November 2014, the 11-hectare (28-acre) Brentwood Town Centre site underwent a major redevelopment as part of a development initiative entitled "The Amazing Brentwood", which aims to create a master-planned neighbourhood. It consists of 120,000 m^{2} (1,300,000 sq ft) of retail space, 46,000 m^{2} (500,000 sq ft) of office space, and three residential high-rise towers which were to be completed between 2018 and 2021.

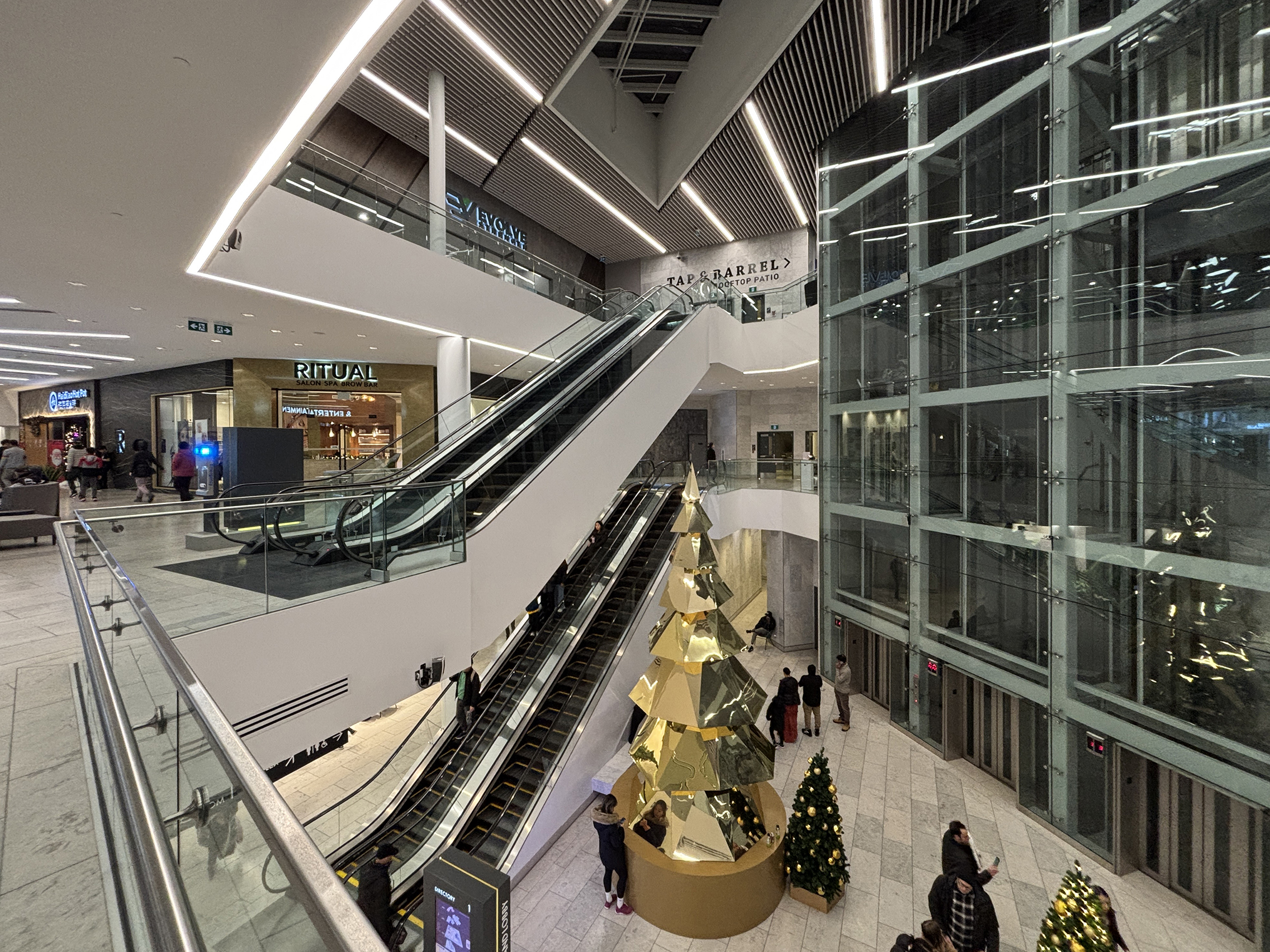
Grand lobby atrium

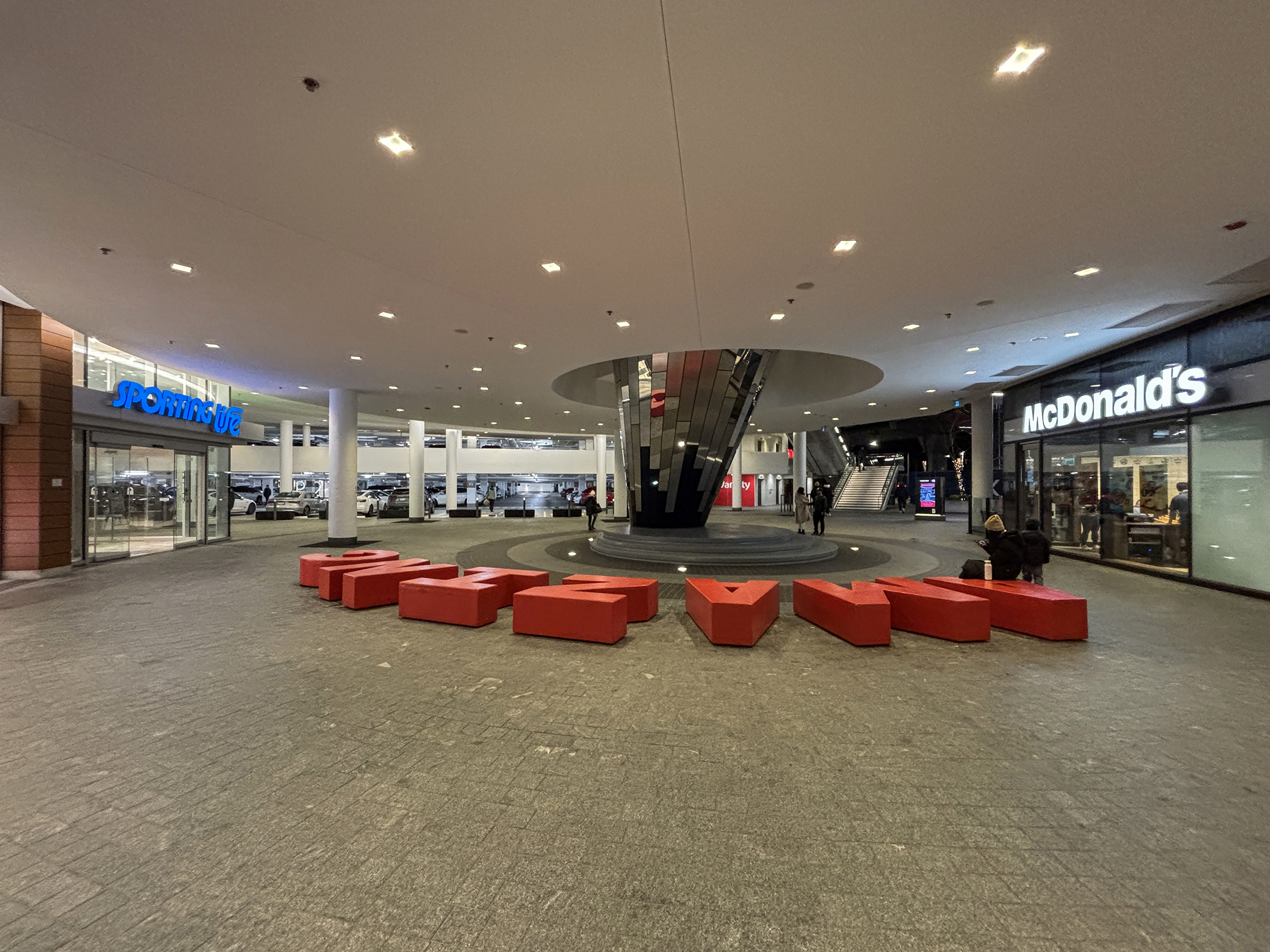
P2 level

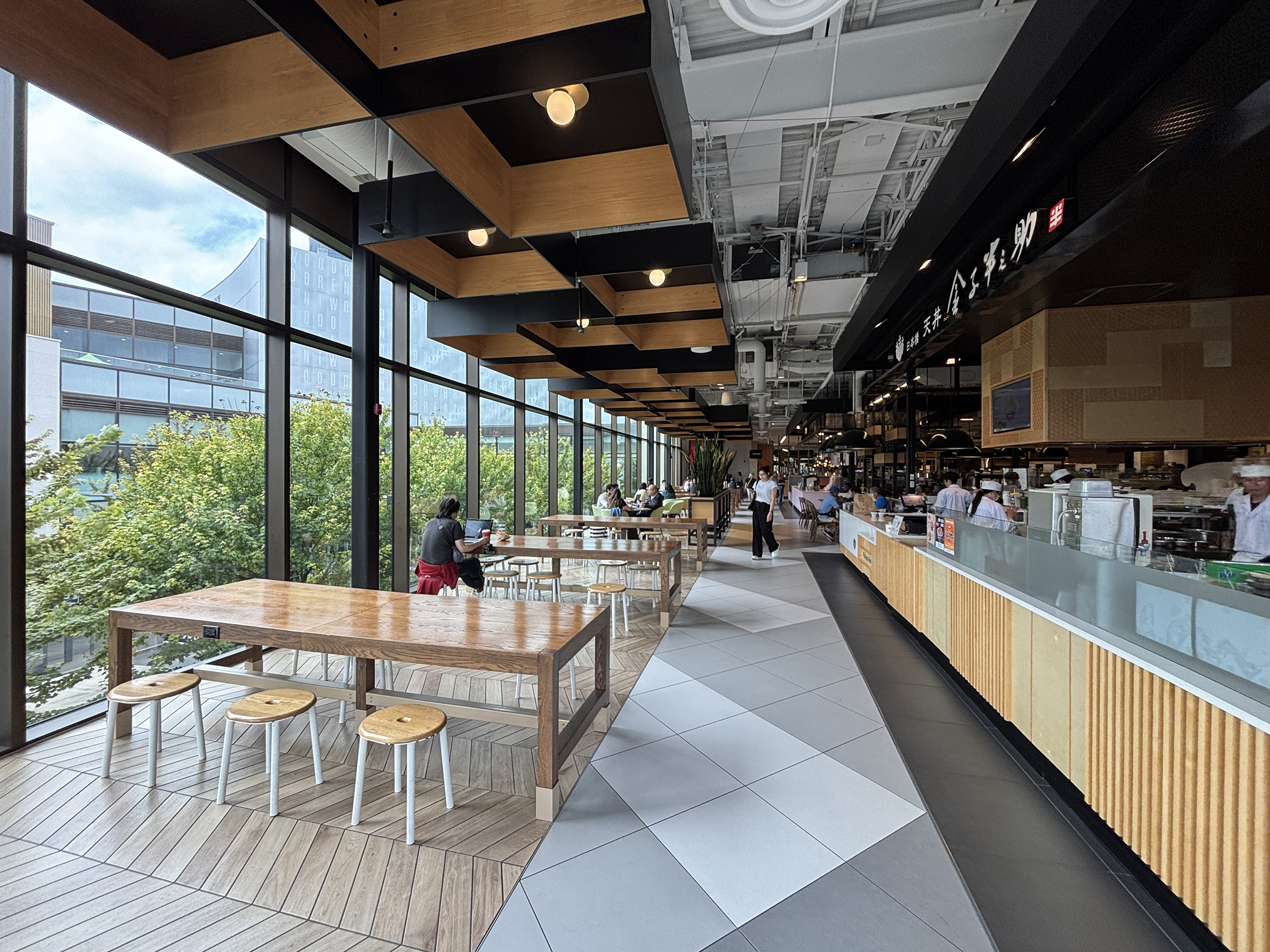
Food court

== Transportation ==
Brentwood Town Centre is directly connected to Brentwood Town Centre station on the Millennium Line of Metro Vancouver's SkyTrain rapid transit system.
