= Brentwood Park =

Neighourhood in Burnaby, British Columbia

- Neighbourhood
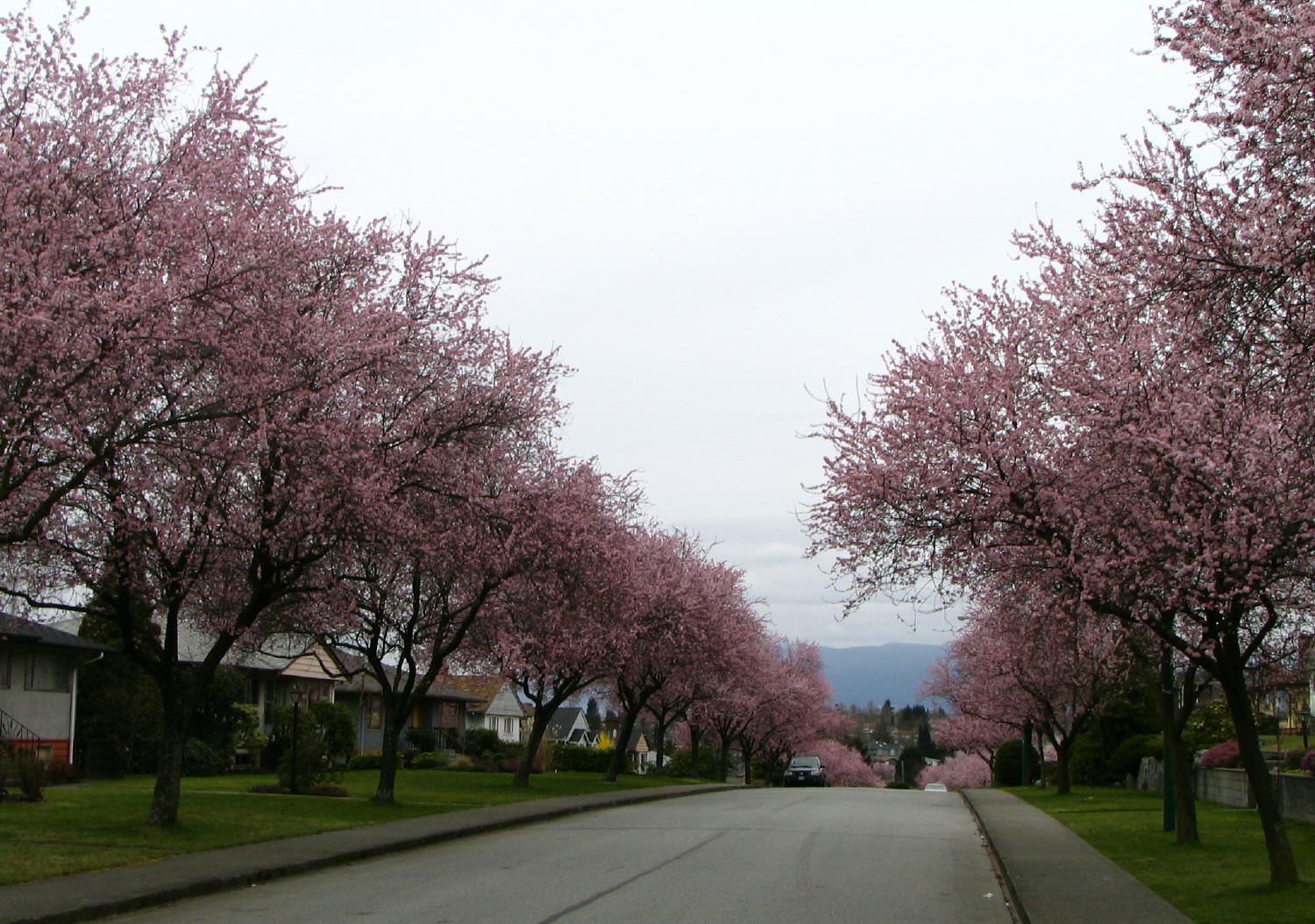
- Spring in Brentwood. Highlawn Drive

- Location within British Columbia
- Coordinates: 49.272°N 122.995°W
- Country: Canada
- Province: British Columbia

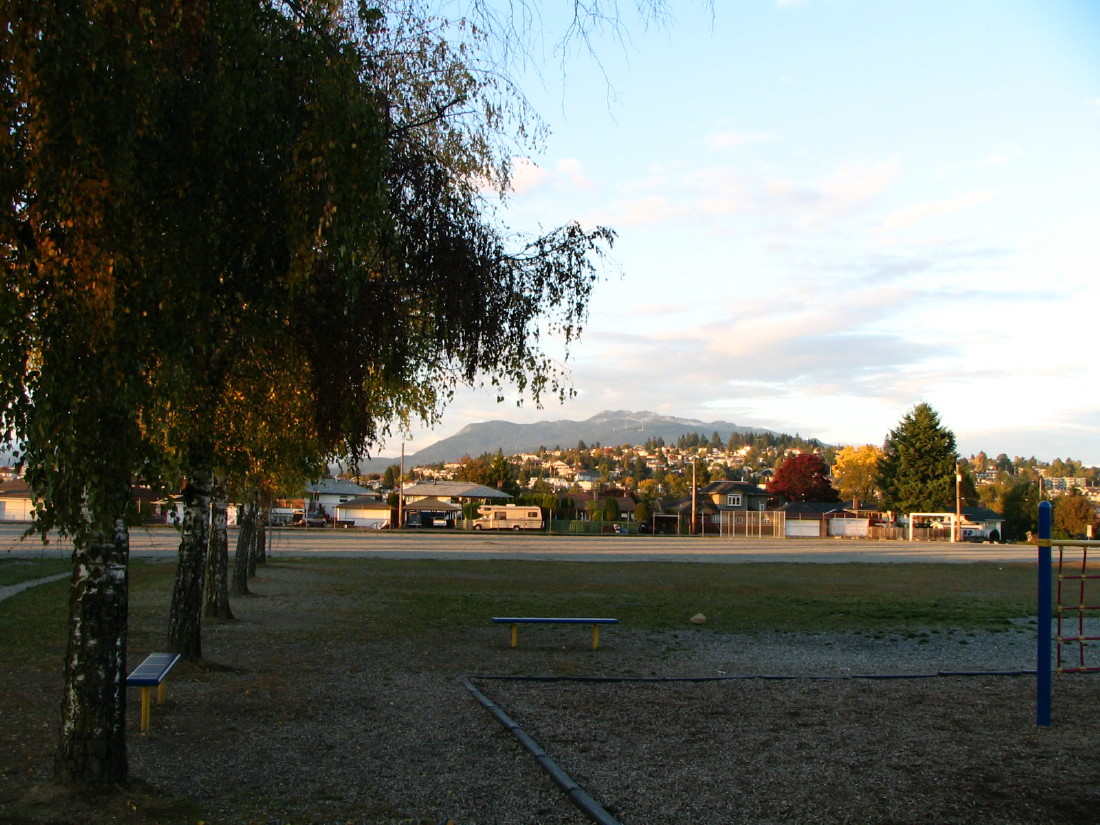
The Brentwood Park area with Capitol Hill and Mt. Seymour to the north

Brentwood Park, or simply Brentwood, is a neighbourhood in North Burnaby, British Columbia, between Willingdon Avenue to the west and Springer Avenue to the east. Hastings Street separates it from the Capitol Hill area to the north, while Lougheed Highway marks the dividing line between this residential area and an area of commercial and industrial land to the south.

== Housing ==
Housing is mostly single-family but there are a number of high-rise and low-rise rental buildings in its south-east corner, near Springer Avenue. Several condominium towers are under construction at the south edge of the area, along SkyTrain tracks.

== Geography ==
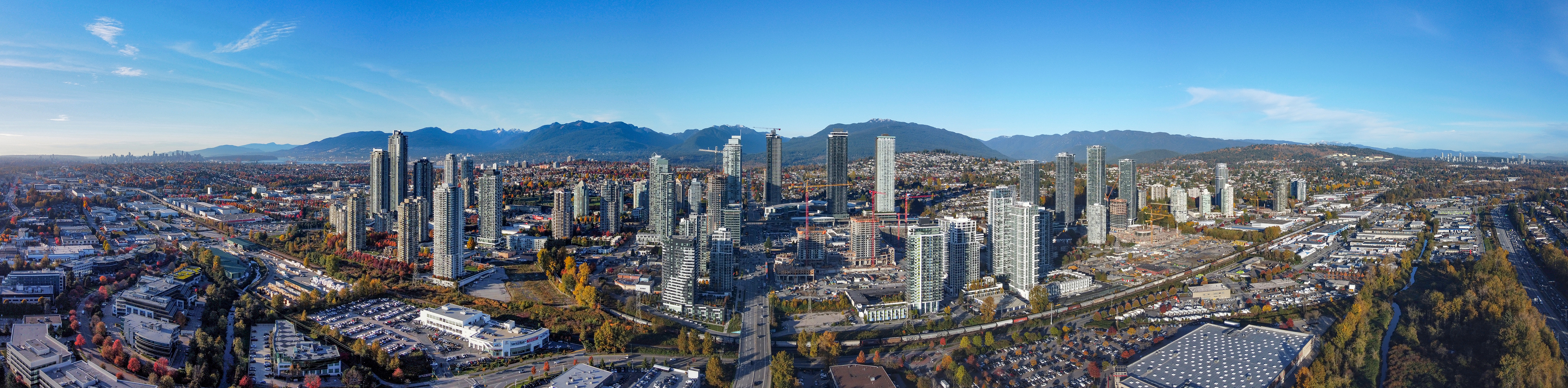
Aerial view of Brentwood Town Centre in 2025

== Transport and amenities ==
The area is served by two stations of the Millennium Line – Brentwood Town Centre station and Holdom station. A bus loop is steps away from Brentwood Town Centre station. Local bus service connects Brentwood with the University of British Columbia, Nanaimo station, Kootenay Loop, Metrotown and other major regional nodes.

Brentwood Mall, a shopping centre, is located in the southwest corner of the neighbourhood, near the border of Vancouver.

Next to the park is Brentwood Park Elementary School. There are a number of churches in the area, mainly along Delta Avenue.

== Scenic walks and activities ==
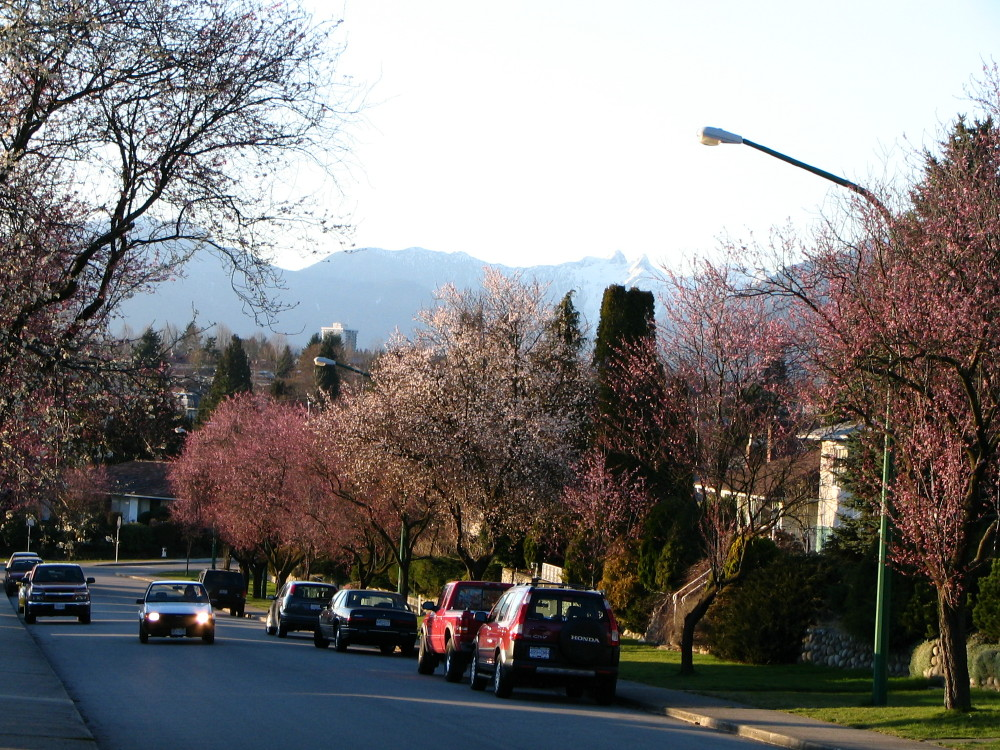
Spring on Brentlawn Drive, Brentwood, with The Lions in the distance

Brentwood has a horseshoe-like grid with a centrally located park of the same name. Beecher Park, west of Springer Avenue, is a park with a stream running through it that joins Still Creek south of Lougheed Highway and eventually flows into Burnaby Lake. It is called Beecher Creek and provides habitat for local salmon species.
