= Hyatt Regency Vancouver =

Hotel building in Vancouver, British Columbia

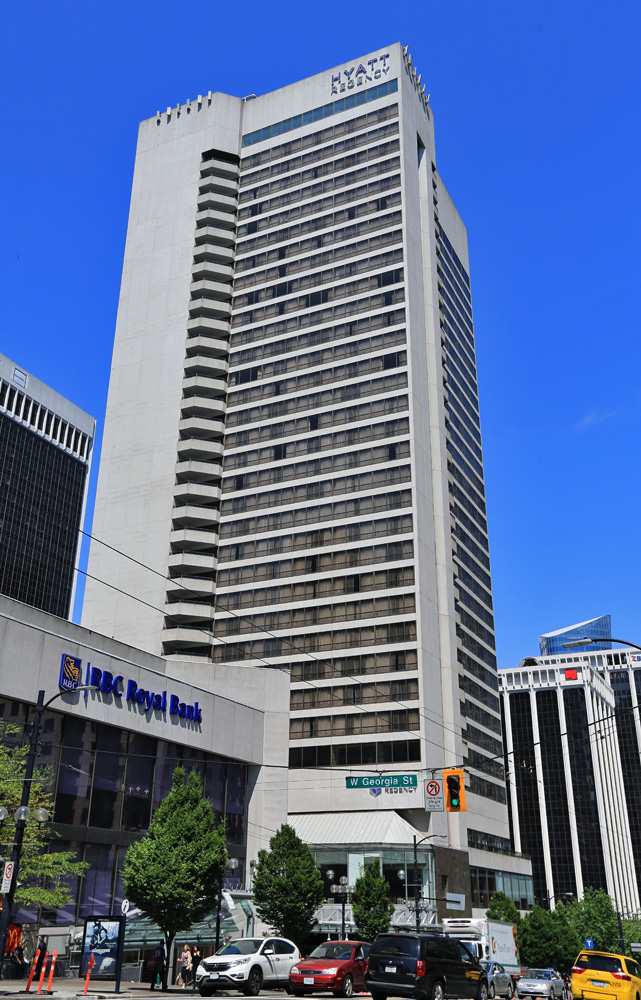
- Hyatt Regency in 2015
- Interactive map of the Hyatt Regency Vancouver area

General information
- Architectural style: Brutalist
- Location: 655 Burrard Street; Vancouver, British Columbia; V6C 2R7
- Coordinates: 49°17′6″N 123°7′14″W
- Opened: 1973
- Owner: Hyatt

Technical details
- Floor count: 35

Other information
- Number of rooms: 650

Website
- Hyatt Regency Vancouver

The Hyatt Regency Vancouver, located at 655 Burrard Street, is a 650-room hotel connected to the Royal Centre complex in Vancouver, British Columbia, Canada. Today, it is the 27th tallest building in downtown Vancouver.

== History ==
Construction of the hotel began around 1969 and was expected to be completed in 1971. However, due to a series of strikes and workers disputes, the opening date was pushed back several times. Construction was eventually finished in late 1973.

The Hyatt Regency Vancouver is a 35 floor tower standing at 359 feet or 109 metres. It was Vancouver's tallest hotel until 2001 and has the largest number of hotel rooms in one building.

=== 1998 'Riot at the Hyatt' ===
In the week preceding this event posters were put up around town inviting people to a 'Riot at the Hyatt'. At the event crowds surrounded the hotel where Prime Minister Jean Chrétien was speaking. Vancouver Police Department waded into the crowd of demonstrators and, according to critics, "beat them with wooden nightsticks". Several young people were injured. Two major official investigations were carried out following the incident: the first was by the Vancouver Police Department, which issued its internal report in 1999; the second was by the New Westminster Police Department, which published its report in 2004. Both concluded that the use of force by the Crowd Control Unit during the event was not sufficient to establish any disciplinary actions against the officers involved.

=== Gingerbread man record ===
In 2003, the staff of the Hyatt Regency Vancouver property created the world's largest Gingerbread Man.

== See also ==
- List of tallest buildings in Vancouver
