= MNP Tower =

MNP Tower may refer to:

- MNP Tower (Edmonton)
- MNP Tower (Vancouver)
