= Hotel Georgia (Vancouver) =

Hotel in British Columbia, Canada

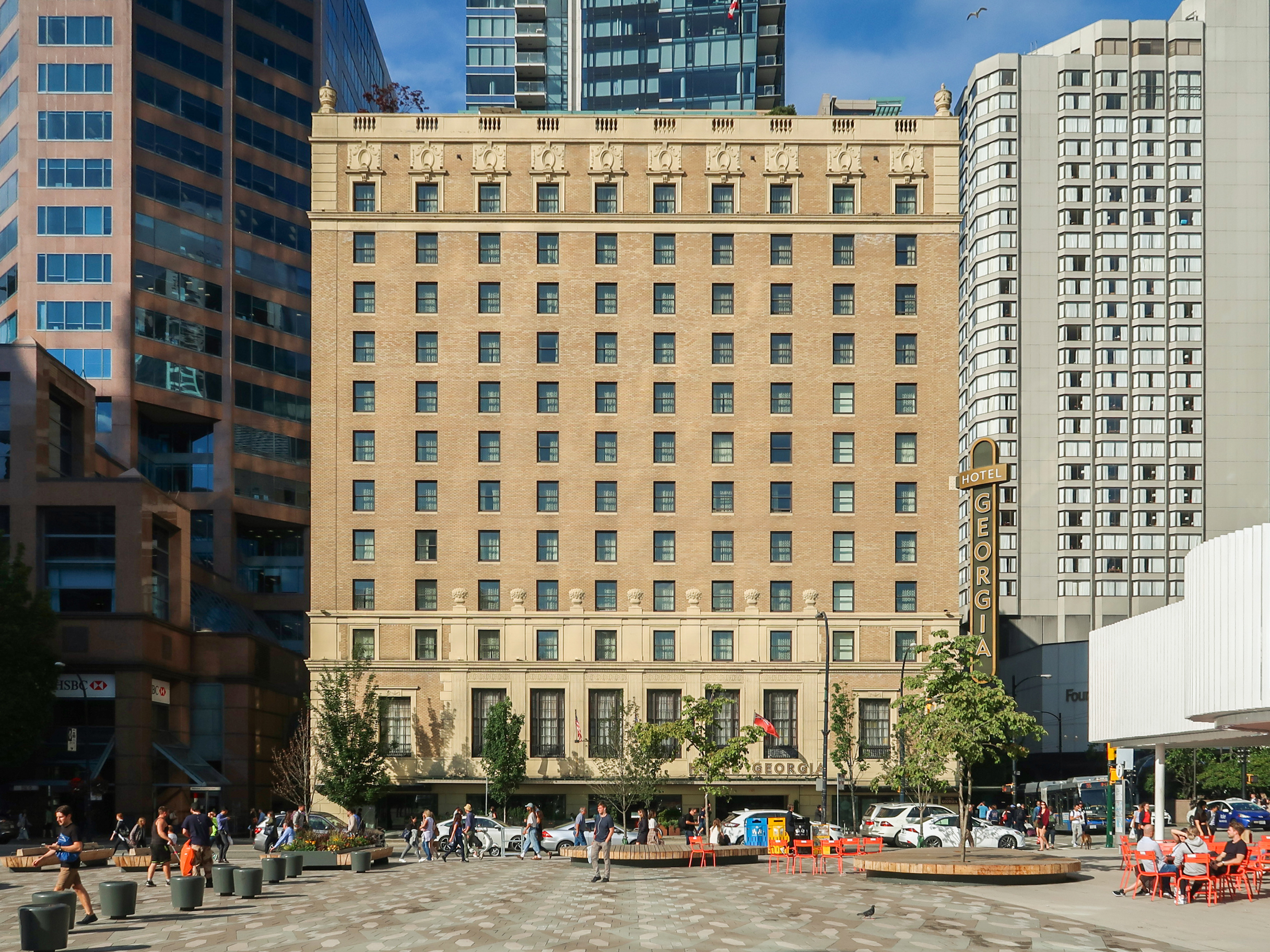
- The Rosewood Hotel Georgia in 2018
- Interactive map of the Hotel Georgia area

General information
- Location: 801 West Georgia Street; Vancouver, British Columbia; V6C 1P7
- Coordinates: 49°17′0.38″N 123°7′8.08″W
- Opened: May 7, 1927
- Renovated: 2024
- Owner: Pacific Reach Properties
- Management: Rosewood Hotels & Resorts

Technical details
- Floor count: 12

Other information
- Number of rooms: 156

Website
- www.rosewoodhotels.com/en/hotel-georgia-vancouver

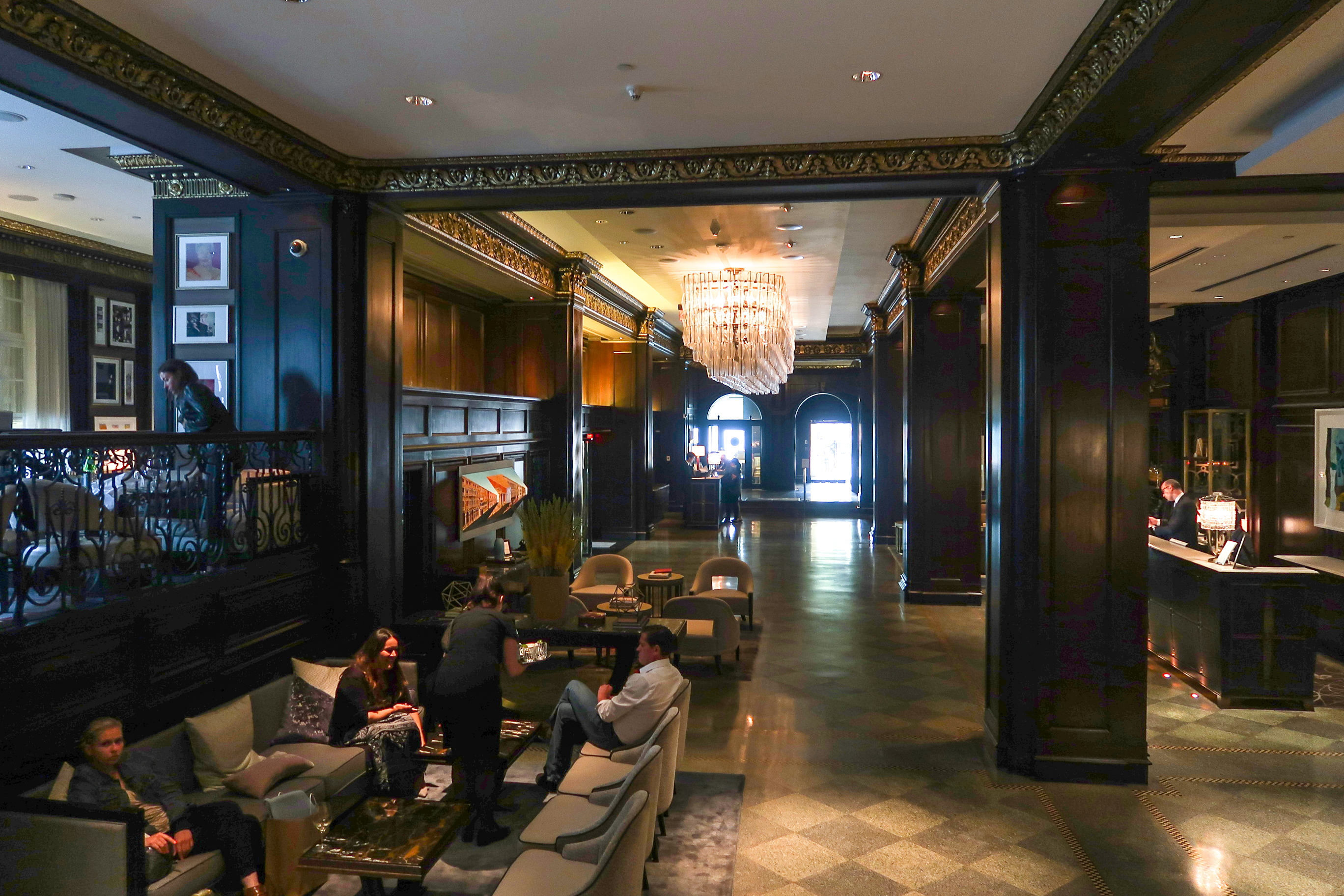
Hotel Lobby

The Rosewood Hotel Georgia is a 12-story historic hotel located at 801 West Georgia Street in the city's downtown core of Vancouver, British Columbia, Canada.

== History ==
The Hotel Georgia was built at a cost of $1.5 million and opened on May 7, 1927; the architects were Robert T. Garrow and John Graham Sr. It became the first international property of Seattle-based Western Hotels on January 31, 1931, and remained with the chain, later Western International Hotels, until August 1, 1972.

In 1998, the Hotel Georgia was sold to Vancouver-based Allied Hotel Properties Inc. for $45 million. They spent a further $10 million renovating the hotel, reopening it as the Crowne Plaza Hotel Georgia in June 1998. Allied announced plans to develop the adjacent parking lot with a 50-story residential tower, before selling the hotel to Seattle-based Goodman Real Estate Inc. and the Delta Group for $65 million in 2005. The new owners reworked the plans for the tower.

In early 2007, the Crowne Plaza Hotel Georgia closed for restoration work and construction of the tower. In 2010, Delta Group announced that the luxury Rosewood Hotels & Resorts chain had been selected to manage the hotel. The hotel reopened on July 10, 2011 as the Rosewood Hotel Georgia. The hotels rooms were gutted and combined, reducing their number from 320 to 155. The restoration of the hotel cost $120 million, while the adjacent Private Residences at the Hotel Georgia 48-story glass condominium tower cost a further $400 million to build. The hotel was asset managed by HVS.The hotel was sold to Vancouver-based Pacific Reach in 2017 for $145 million.

The hotel closed for renovations on January 1, 2024, and reopened on July 3, 2024. Renovations included the refurbishment of the lobby and 1927 Lobby Lounge, as well as the Reflections Terrace, front desk, and rooms and suites. The basement of the hotel, that has long housed beer halls, cocktail bars, and nightclubs, was also redeveloped, opening in 2024 as Prophecy, a cocktail lounge.

== The Private Residences at Hotel Georgia ==
A 48-story, 158.5 metre, high-rise residential building has been constructed on the adjoining site of the hotel's parking structure. It is the 3rd tallest tower in the city, after the Living Shangri-La Tower and the Paradox Hotel and Tower. All three of these developments are new mixed use hotel/residences towers on Georgia Street.

== See also ==
- List of heritage buildings in Vancouver
- List of tallest buildings in Vancouver
- List of tallest buildings in British Columbia
