= List of tallest buildings in Vancouver =

Skyline of Vancouver
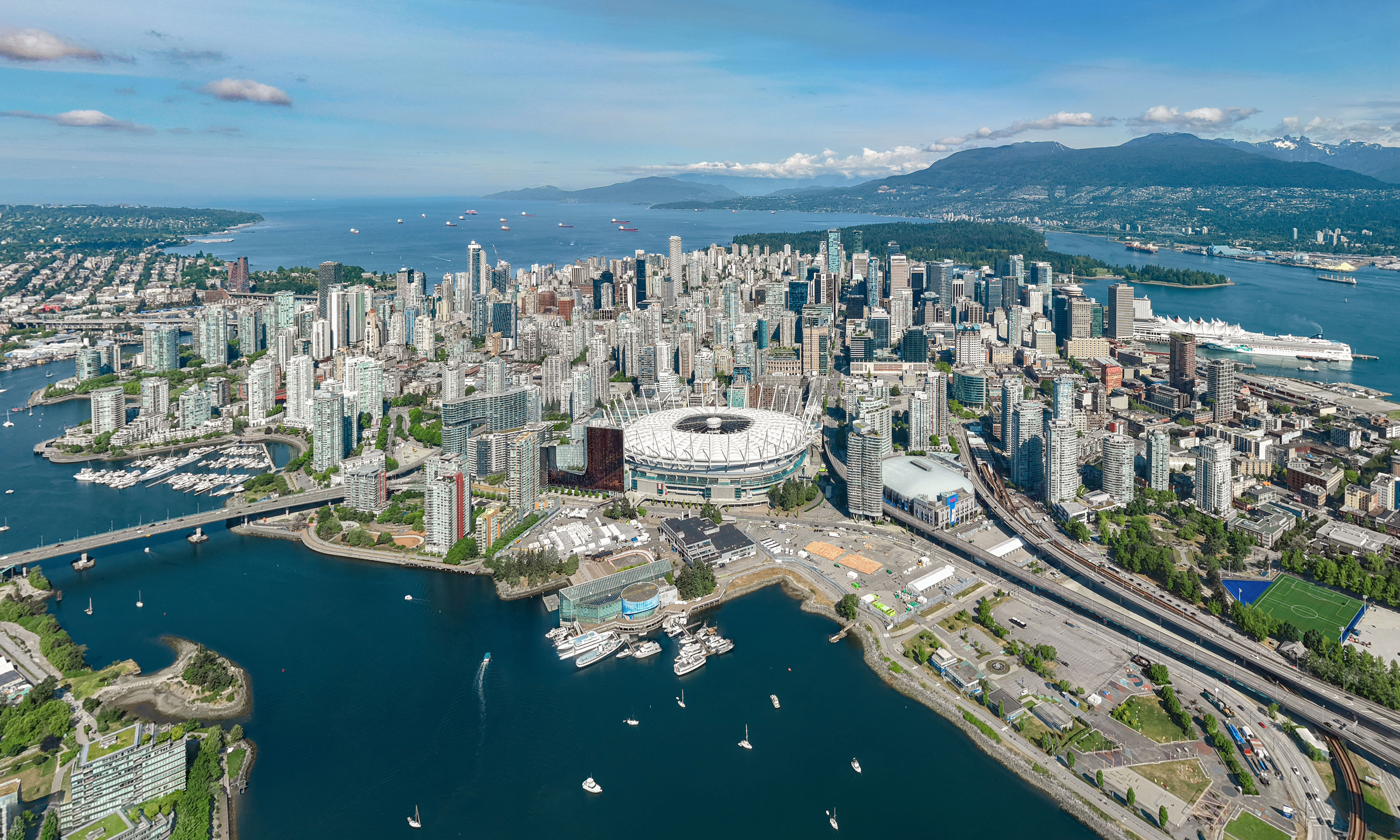
- Downtown Vancouver in 2026
- Tallest building: Living Shangri-La (2010)
- Tallest building height: 200.9 m (659 ft)
- First 150 m+ building: Living Shangri-La

Number of tall buildings (2026)
- Taller than 100 m (328 ft): 72
- Taller than 150 m (492 ft): 7
- Taller than 200 m (656 ft): 1

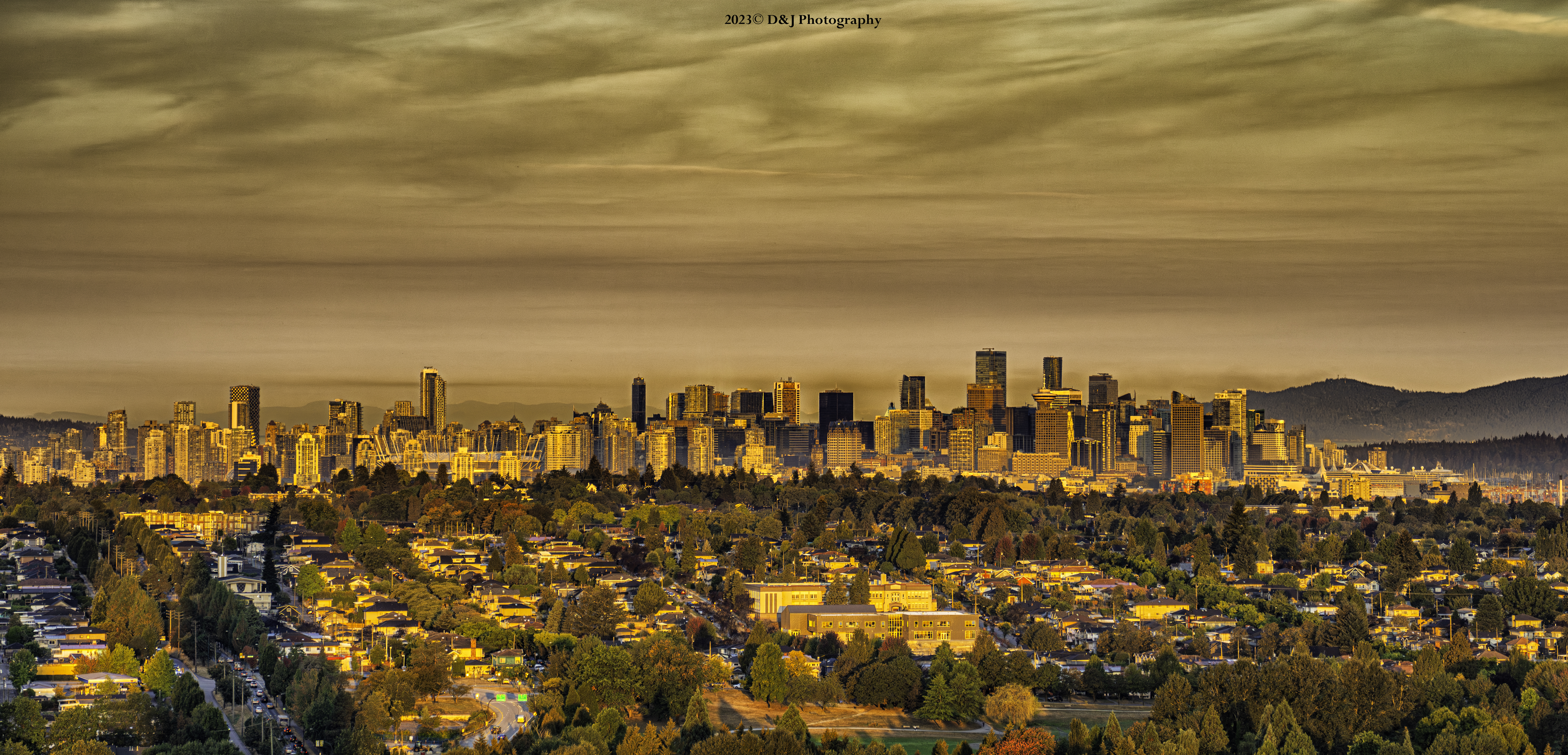
Vancouver from the east in 2022

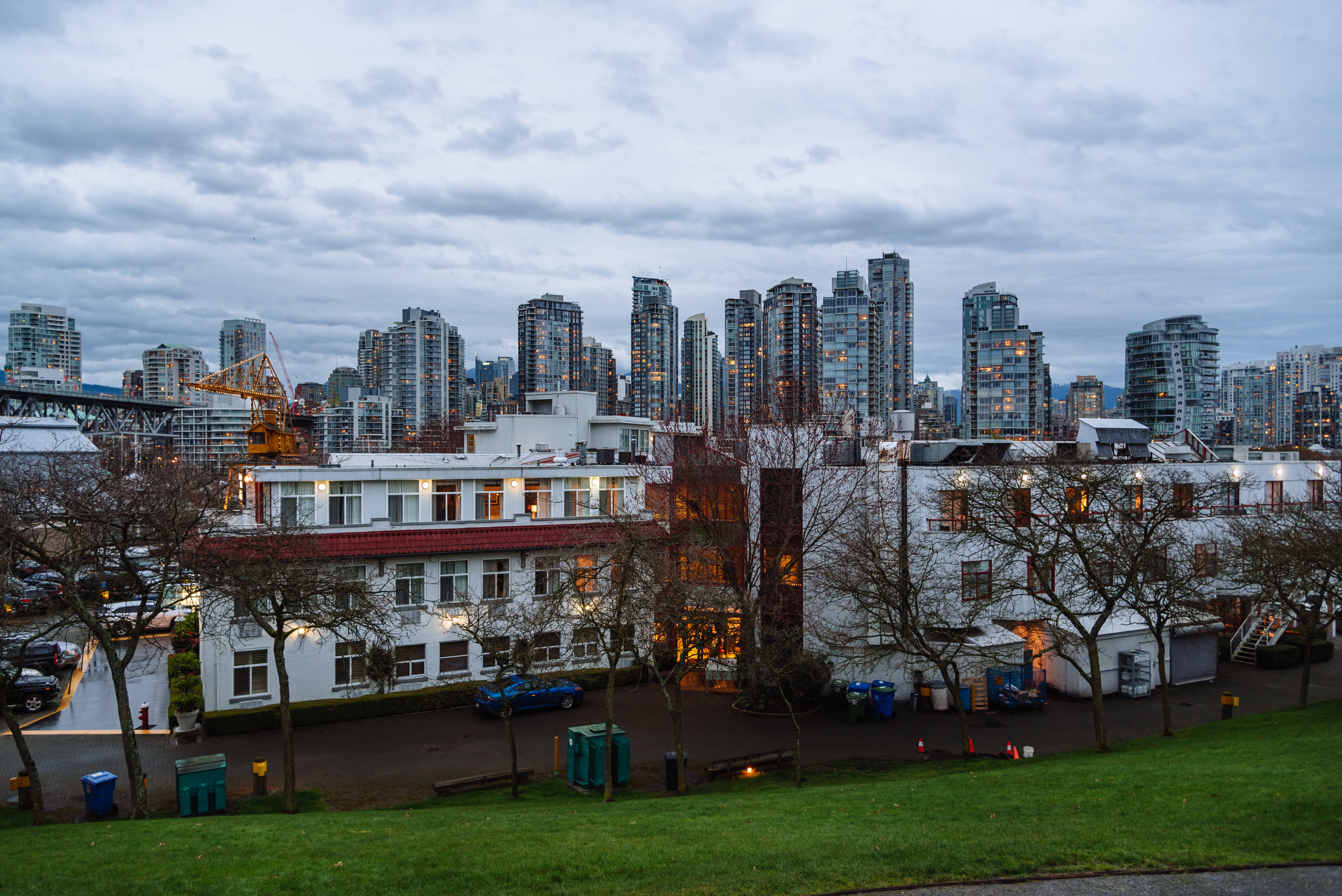
Vancouver's skyline from Granville Island in 2016

Vancouver is the most populous city in the Canadian province of British Columbia. With a metropolitan area population of 2,642,825 as of 2021, it is the third largest metropolitan area in Canada. Vancouver's skyline is characterized by its abundance and density of residential towers, unique amongst cities in North America, as well as its position on a peninsula on the Burrard Inlet. As of 2026, Vancouver has 72 buildings that reach a height of 100 m (328 ft), and Greater Vancouver is the metropolitan area with the second most skyscrapers and high-rises in Canada, behind Greater Toronto.

One of the earliest tall buildings in the city was the Hotel Vancouver, one of Canada's grand railway hotels. Vancouver underwent a building boom starting in the mid-1960s, with many notable office towers such as TD Tower and the Harbour Centre being added to the skyline in the 1970s. From the 1980s onwards, Vancouver's urban planning in downtown has been highly influenced by the philosophy of Vancouverism, which encouraged mixed-use developments, narrow high-rise residential towers atop a commercial base, and reliance on public transit. The majority of high-rise construction since the early 1990s has been residential, and this boom has continued to the present.

The city has 27 protected view corridors which limit the construction of tall buildings that interfere with the line of sight to the North Shore Mountains, the downtown skyline, and the waters of English Bay and the Strait of Georgia. Nevertheless, there are seven buildings taller than 150 m (492 ft) in Vancouver today. The tallest building in the city is the 62-storey, 201 (659) Living Shangri-La, completed in 2010. It took the title from One Wall Centre, another mixed-use skyscraper with hotel and residential components, which was completed in 2001. Living Shangri-La was the first building in Vancouver to surpass 150 metres, marking a trend in increasingly tall buildings since the 2010s. Some notable additions include Paradox Hotel Vancouver (2016), Vancouver House (2019), and The Butterfly (2024), currently the city's second, seventh, and fifth-tallest buildings respectively. A relaxation of the view corridor policy in 2024 will likely encourage further growth across the Downtown Peninsula. In 2025, a proposal surfaced for a three-tower complex with a 315 m (1,033) supertall skyscraper, which would become the tallest building in the city and in all of Western Canada if built.

Almost all of the city's buildings that exceed 100 metres in height are located in Downtown Vancouver and the nearby areas that make up the Downtown Peninsula, including Yaletown and Coal Harbour. Shorter high-rises can be found more sparsely in neighbourhoods such as Gastown and Fairview that surround the Peninsula. A growing number of high-rise developments have occurred outside of the peninsula in recent years, including a cluster of high-rises around Marine Drive station in South Vancouver that appeared in the 2010s. The indigenous-led Sen̓áḵw development, currently under construction at the foot of the Burrard Bridge, will extend the skyline to the southwest, while the Oakridge Center redevelopment around Oakridge Park will result in a new high-rise cluster in Oakridge.

== History ==
Number of buildings by height in Vancouver by the end of each year, taking into account demolished buildings. Click on the legend to toggle a specific height on or off. View chart definition.

=== 1900s–1950s: Early development ===
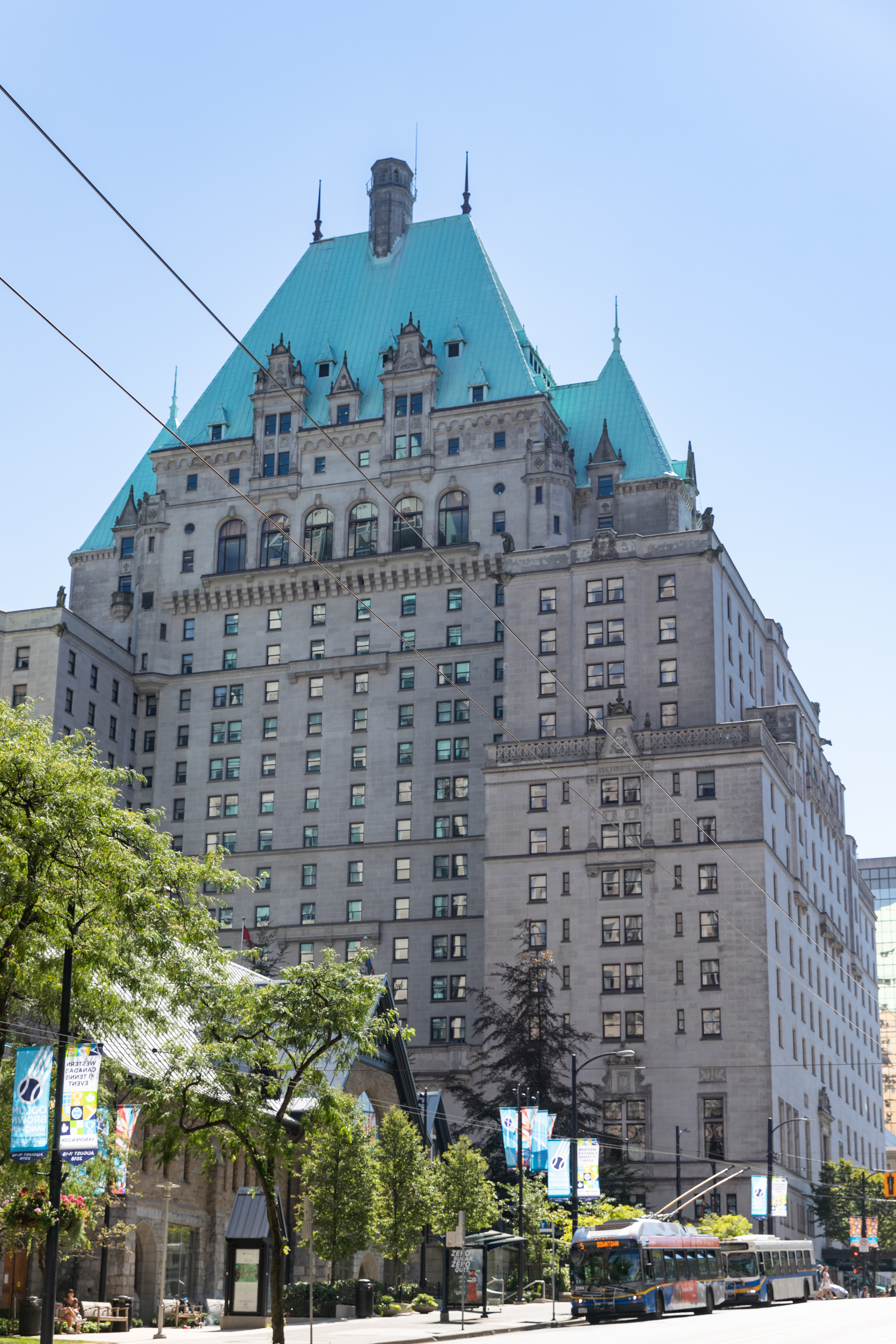
The third and final Hotel Vancouver.

Vancouver's history of skyscrapers began with the Dominion Building, the city's first high-rise. It was a 13-storey Beaux-Arts style commercial building completed in 1910. It was briefly the tallest building in Vancouver and in the entirety of the British Empire, until the nearby Sun Tower rose in 1912. Commissioned by L. D. Taylor to house his newspaper, The Vancouver World, he intended for the building to be the tallest in the city. These early high-rises were located around the city's Commercial Square (now the Victory Square park), contrasting the heavy stone construction of the turn of the century.

The Edwardian Vancouver Block, at 15 stories tall, was also completed in 1912, featuring a clock tower. Neon lighting would be added to the clock face in 1927, the first neon lighting erected in Vancouver. These early high-rises reflected the city's early economic boom, driven by rapid population growth; between 1901 and 1911, Vancouver's population grew from 26,133 to 100,401. The Sun Tower would be overtaken by Marine Building in 1930, designed in the Art Deco style that was in vogue in North America at the time. The 21-storey, 98 m (321 ft) tall building was named after the marine-themed ornaments that decorate it, such as depictions of sea snails, crabs, and turtles.

Another early high-rise was the Hotel Vancouver, the second building to hold that name; it was an Italian Renaissance style hotel built in 1916. The hotel sat on the site of the original Hotel Vancouver, which had a shingle-style design and was the city's first grand hotel when it was completed in 1888. The first hotel closed in 1913 and was later demolished. Both hotels were built by the Canadian Pacific Railway; a rival company, the Canadian Northern Railway, and later the Canadian National Railway, had planned to build a hotel of its own in the city. The new hotel, located northwest of the Hotel Vancouver, began construction in 1928; however, the Great Depression delayed the completion and opening of the hotel until 1939. Money to finally complete the hotel was provided by the Canadian government in 1937. Fearing the market was not large enough for competing hotels, the railways agreed to a joint CP-CN hotel as a condition of the completion. The second hotel was closed in 1939 to prevent competition with the new hotel. It was used as a barracks during World War II, and subsequently demolished in 1949. The new Châteauesque Hotel Vancouver was the first building to breach 100 m (328 ft) in height. It remained as the city's tallest building for over 30 years, and is now considered one of Canada's grand railway hotels.

=== 1960s–1970s: Office expansion ===
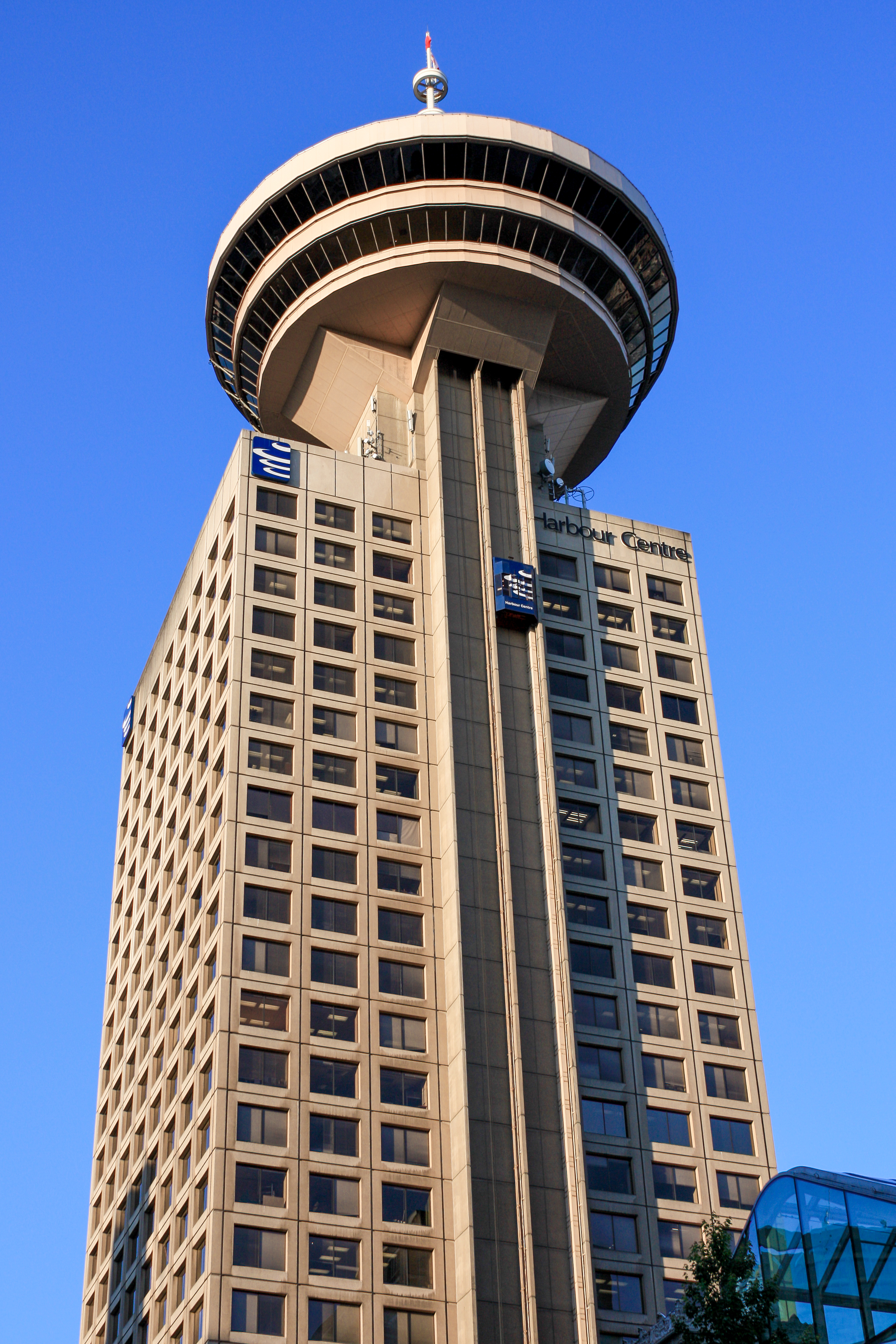
Vancouver's Harbour Centre, with an elevator visible on the right

Little to no new high-rises were built downtown between the 1940s and the late 1960s, other than the completion of the new BC Electric headquarters (today the Electra condominiums), completed in 1957. From the late 1960s to the early 1980s, Vancouver witnessed a major expansion of skyscraper and high-rise construction downtown, fundamentally reshaping its skyline. These new skyscrapers largely adopted the international and modern styles. Notable new offices included Arthur Erickson Place in 1968, the TD Tower in 1972, and the Royal Centre in 1973. TD Tower, which is connected to the Pacific Centre shopping mall, overtook the Hotel Vancouver to briefly become the tallest building in Vancouver at 127 m (417 ft), before the Royal Centre took the title a year later at a height of 145 m (476 ft). Granville Square, completed in 1973, became a prominent building overlooking Waterfront station; the top of the building houses the Vancouver Harbour Control Tower, the tallest air traffic control tower in the world at 142 m (466 ft) high. Another major development was the Bentall Centre, which initially consisted of four office towers, built between 1967 and 1981.

Harbour Centre became the tallest building in the city at 147 m (482 ft) upon completion in 1977. On top of the office building is a "UFO-shaped" observation tower, featuring a 360-degree viewing deck and a revolving restaurant that offers visitors a view of Downtown Vancouver from above. The building is a prominent landmark on the city's skyline, with the tower and antenna extending the structure's height to 177 m (581 ft). The Vancouver Lookout tourist attraction was opened by Neil Armstrong, whose footprint was imprinted onto cement and was on display on the observation deck, until it was lost during later renovations.

The 1960s would also see an influx of high-rise buildings in the West End neighbourhood, west of downtown. Many Bauhaus-style residential buildings were built between the 1960s and early 1970s. This wave of development was controversial at the time, and the resulting increase in density was met with considerable opposition. However, today the neighbourhood is regarded as one of Vancouver's most desirable areas, in part from the residential towers in the area. Two notable hotel skyscrapers were also built in the area: the Coast Plaza Hotel in 1969, and the Empire Landmark Hotel in 1974. The latter overtook Hotel Vancouver as the city's tallest hotel, and had the city's first revolving restaurant on its top floor, Cloud 9, before the Harbour Centre. Both hotels were closed in 2017, and the Empire Landmark Hotel was demolished from 2018 and 2019. It is the tallest voluntarily demolished building in all of Canada.

=== 1980s–1990s: Vancouverism ===
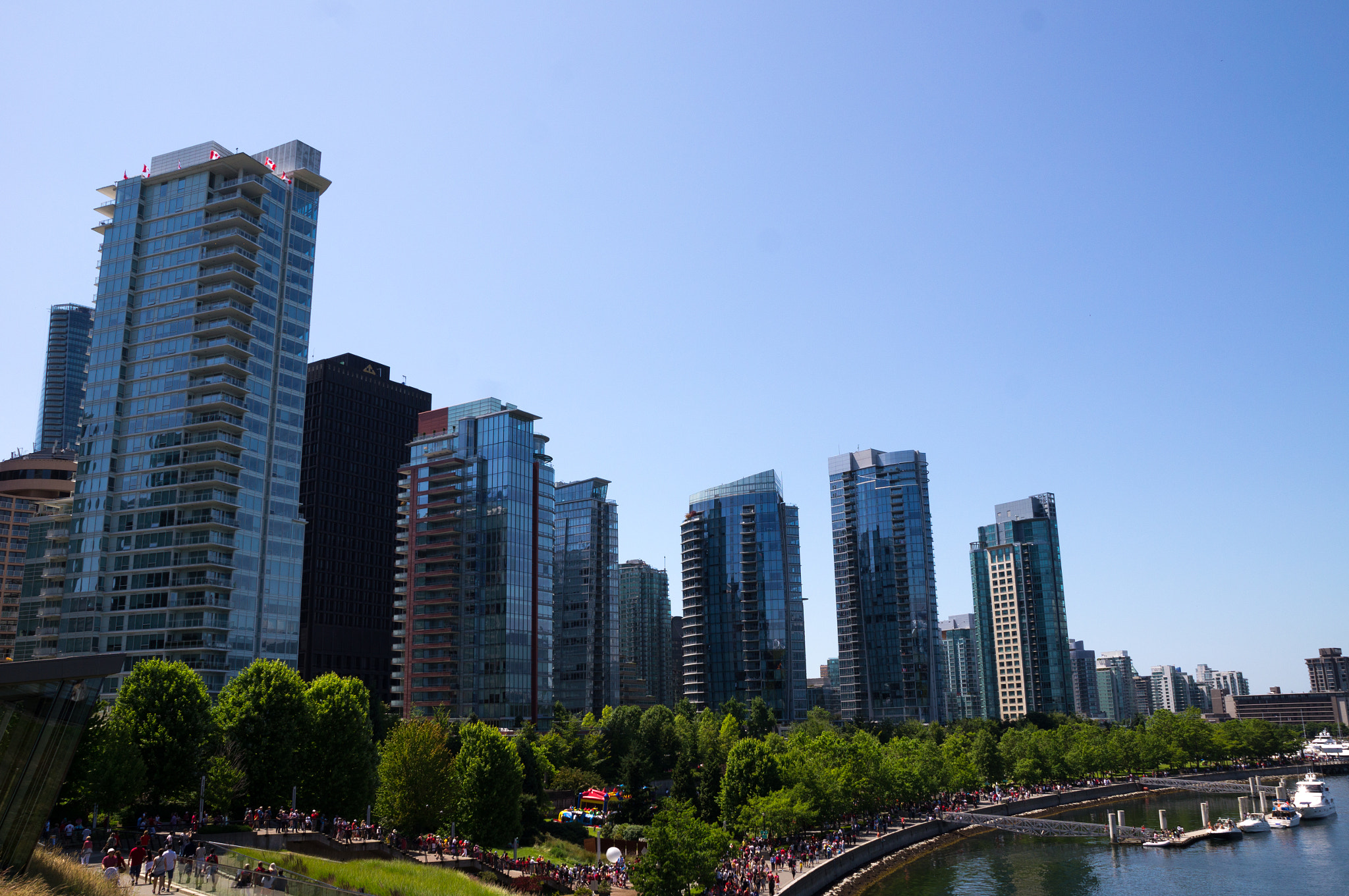
Coal Harbour's waterfront

In the 1980s, an urban planning paradigm began to emerge in Vancouver which sought to promote a large residential population living near the city centre in mixed-use developments, typically narrow high-rise towers atop a wide-medium height commercial base, as well as an increased reliance on mass transit, and preserving views of Vancouver's surrounding landscape. This philosophy was named Vancouverism, after the city itself. In 1989, the city council designated 26 protected view cones (also called view corridors) to ensure views of the ocean and North Shore Mountains were maintained from certain parts of the city. The view corridors covered much of the Downtown Peninsula, limiting the height that skyscrapers could reach for the decades to come. Some have partly attributed Vancouverism and the growing prevalence of high-rise towers to the increase in immigrants from Hong Kong to the city during the 1980s.

Vancouver's world fair held in 1986, Expo 86, brought renewed attention to the city, and is widely seen as marking a shift in Vancouver's perception from a provincial locale to a city with global clout. Since the 1990s, residential construction has made up a majority of high-rise development in Vancouver, and residential towers began to regularly exceed 100 metres (328 feet). Development was spreading south of downtown, with buildings such as The Pinnacle (1996) and Landmark 33 (1998) in Yaletown. The completion of BC Place and Rogers Arena southeast of downtown around this time would also spur high-rise development nearby. The area of Coal Harbour northwest of downtown was greatly transformed by urban development. An industrial area for much of the 20th century, Coal Harbour is now characterized by high-rise residential towers. Expo 86 would also lead to the completion of Vancouver's rapid transit system, SkyTrain, which would go on to encourage transit-oriented development in Vancouver and its metropolitan area.

=== 2000s–2010s: New heights ===
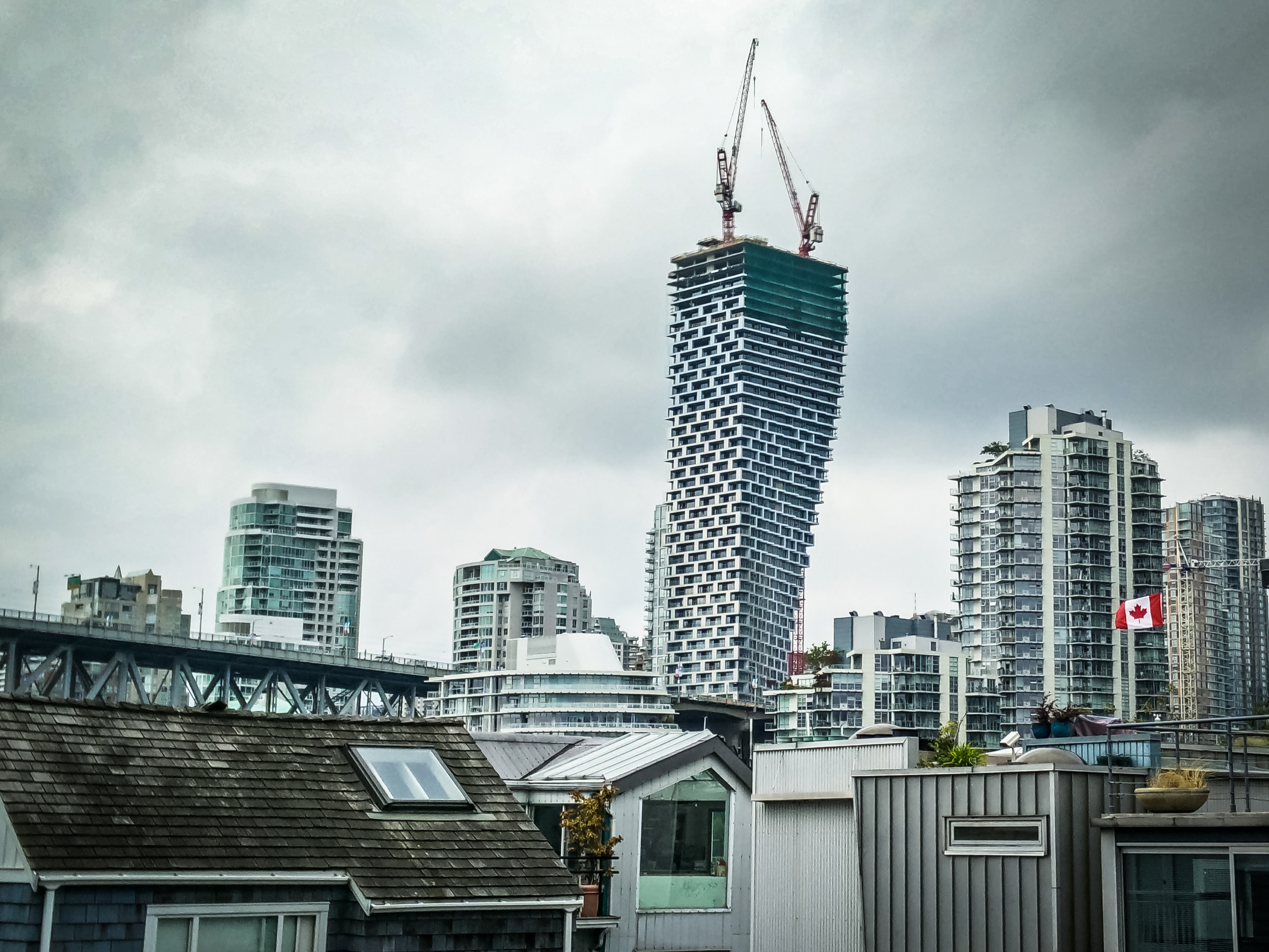
Vancouver House, seen under construction in 2018.

The Harbour Centre, which stood as the city's tallest building for 24 years, would be dethroned by One Wall Centre, part of the Wall Centre development, in 2001. The mixed-use hotel and residential skyscraper has a roof height of 149.8 m (491), just 0.2 m shy of the 150 m benchmark. The building's height prompted city planners to negotiate with the developer, which agreed to use a light color of glass for the exterior. During construction, the city discovered a darker tint of glass was being applied instead. The upper floors were initially completed with a more translucent shade of glass, which were ultimately replaced with the same type of glass used on the lower floors. One Wall Centre has the distinction of being the first building in the world to use a tuned liquid column damper to control wind vibrations.

Towards the new century, there was growing concern that the city's approach to Vancouverism, owing to the view corridors established in 1989, would lessen visual interest in the skyline, and failed to represent the city's contemporary image. In response, the city council commissioned a "Skyline Study" in 1997 which concluded that the visual interest of Vancouver's skyline would benefit from the addition of a handful of buildings exceeding current height limits. One of those sites would be the location of Living Shangri-La, Vancouver's current tallest building. Completed in 2010, the skyscraper broke through both the 150 m (492 ft) and 200 m (656 ft) barriers. Like One Wall Centre, it is a mixed-use building with a hotel and residential units.

The 2010s brought further growth in height around the Downtown Peninsula. The city's second tallest building, Paradox Hotel Vancouver, was completed in 2016. Woodward's 34, built in 2010, became the tallest building in Gastown and Downtown Eastside at 122 m (401 ft) tall. The area around the entrance to Granville Street Bridge, on the south of the peninsula, had steadily increased in height from the 2000s. Developments such as The Mark (2013) and The Charleson (2018) added weight to the skyline around it. In 2019, the neofuturist Vancouver House, with its honeycomb texture, would become a distinctive landmark when entering the peninsula from the bridge.

While high-rise development outside of the downtown core had been nearly nonexistent due to zoning restrictions and view cones, this gradually began to change in the 2010s. In South The Marine Gateway development in South Vancouver, around Marine Drive station, was built in the late 2010s, forming a second distinct cluster of high-rise within city limits. In the far east of city limits around Joyce–Collingwood station, a line of high-rises have appeared in the early 21st century, although these towers may be considered a part of the high-rise cluster in Metrotown, in the city of Burnaby.

=== 2020s–present: Beyond downtown ===
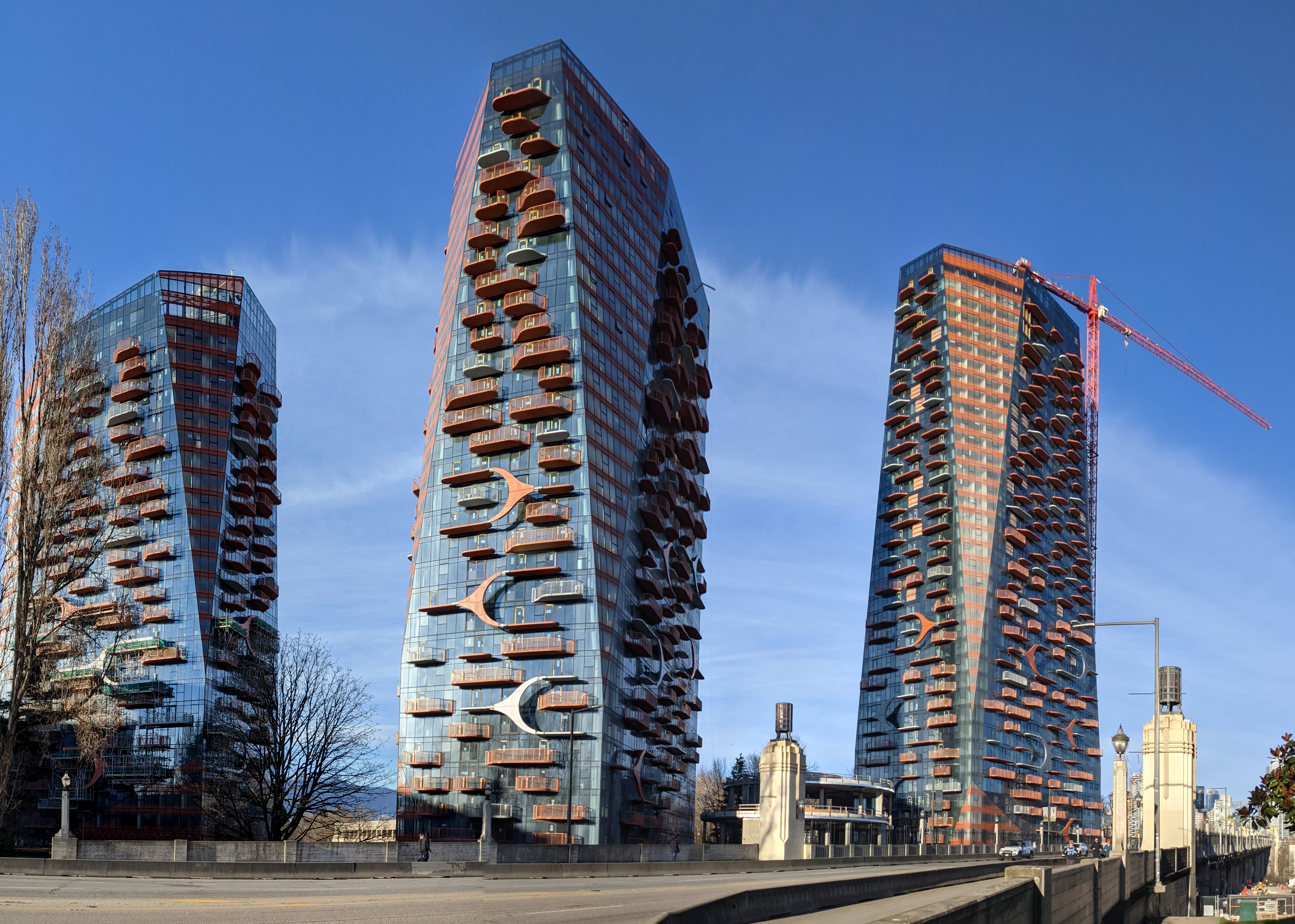
The Sen̓áḵw development on Squamish Nation land, near completion in 2026.

So far, three additional skyscrapers above 150 m (492 ft) have been built on the Downtown Peninsula in the 2020s, that being One Burrard Place (2021), The Stack (2023), and The Butterfly (2024). One Burrard Place was briefly the tallest residential building in Vancouver, before it was overtaken by The Butterfly. The Butterfly's cylindrical form is integrated into a Baptist church at the base, while The Stack is an office building that resembles a series of stacked boxes. These new skyscrapers, as well as Vancouver House and the curved Alberni by Kengo Kuma (2023) are seen as a departure from the standard glass-clad designs of Vancouver's earlier high-rises.

The 2020s has seen an acceleration in high-rise development outside of downtown. Sen̓áḵw is a planned development of over 11 residential towers, ranging from 12 to 58 storeys in height, built on land owned by the Squamish Nation around the entrance of the Burrard Bridge, south of downtown. The Squamish Nation won the land back in 2003, and plans to develop the site were approved in 2020. As the land is not subject to the city's zoning laws, the Squamish Nation were able to build at higher densities than normally allowed under the city's zoning. Currently under construction, the towers will extend the downtown skyline to the southwest. The first phase, consisting of three towers, are expected to be built by 2026.

Another indigenous-led project, Jericho Lands, is being planned by the Musqueam First Nation, Squamish Nation, and Tsleil-Waututh First Nation. Occupying the Jericho Hill Grounds in West Point Grey, the site would house 24,000 people across 10 million square feet, in residential towers of up to 32 storeys. The development will take place over a 30-year horizon. If built, it would form a new cluster of high-rises west of downtown.

In South Vancouver, the ongoing redevelopment of the Oakridge Park shopping centre will involve the construction of ten residential towers, up to 154.3 m (506 ft) tall, forming another separate cluster to the south of downtown. Nearby, the planned Oakridge Transit Centre development will include 17 buildings between four and 26 storeys. Between Oakridge and Marine Gateway, the Cambie Gardens development was built in 2023, including a 28-storey affordable housing tower named Dogwood Gardens. Fraser Commons is a standalone development of two 22 and 14-storey towers in the Sunset area, completed in 2022.

In the metropolitan area, significant skyscraper clusters have emerged in the early 21st century, partly driven by transit-oriented development, most notably in Metrotown and Brentwood in Burnaby, but also in Burquitlam and Coquitlam Town Centre in Coquitlam, and in New Westminster, Richmond, and Surrey. The development of these centres has led an increasingly polycentric skyline throughout Metro Vancouver to address the city's high demand for living space.

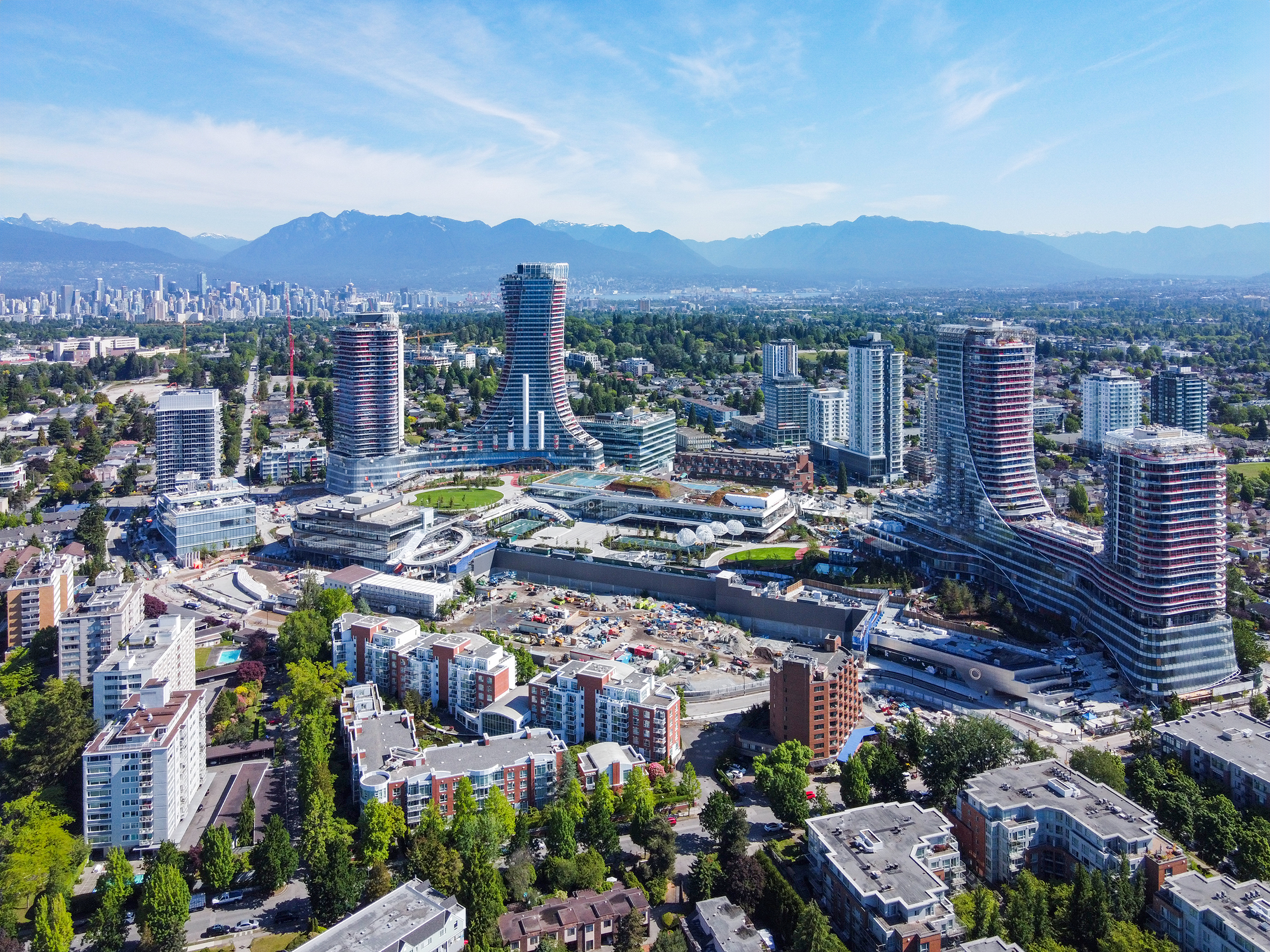
Oakridge Park under construction in 2026

A number of pro-development policies have been passed in recent years, to address the city's high housing costs by increasing the supply of new homes. The Broadway Plan is a 30-year plan to improve housing, jobs, and amenities around the Broadway extension to the SkyTrain's Millennium Line. It was approved in 2022 and amended in 2024 to further increase the density allowed in the plan. Under the plan, Vancouver's main skyline would expand towards the areas of Fairview and Mount Pleasant, helping to increase the availability of housing in the city. In 2024, the city council relaxed its view cone policy, reducing 14 of the 38 view cones and eliminating two entirely. This could potentially unlock 215 million square feet of development and 75,000 units of housing. The view cones have been criticized for being arbitrary and contributing to the city's housing crisis.

In 2025, a proposal was revealed for a development at 501-595 West Georgia Street that comprises four towers, three of which are taller than the city's current tallest building, Living Shangri-La. The tallest building would reach a height of 315 m (1,033 ft), becoming Vancouver's first supertall skyscraper. It would also be the tallest building in Canada outside of Toronto. The complex will create 1,939 new homes, a 920-room hotel, and 70,130 square feet of conference space. Its curved design, described as being wrapped by a "sculptural exoskeleton", is inspired by sea sponges off the coast of British Columbia, and would be a striking landmark on the skyline if built.

In July 2025, the Shangri-La hotel announced that the city's tallest building, Living Shangri-La, will be rebranded to the Hyatt Vancouver Downtown Alberni, having been acquired by Brookfield Properties.

== Cityscape ==
Vancouver from Stanley Park in 2022

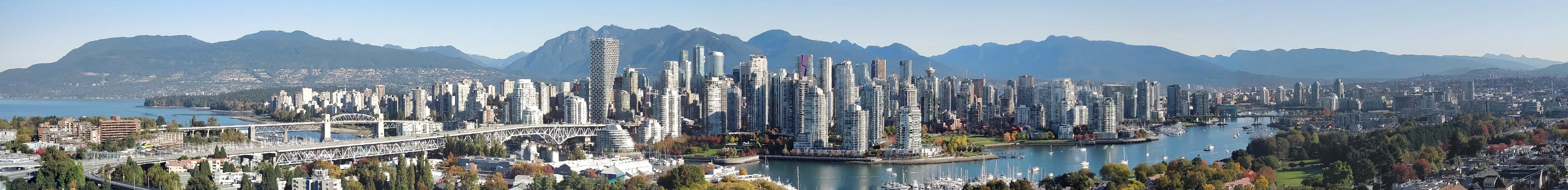
Panorama of the Downtown Peninsula in 2019

== Map of tallest buildings ==
This map shows the location of buildings in Vancouver that are taller than 100 m (328 ft). Each marker is coloured by the decade of the building's completion. There are three buildings that exceed this height that are not visible on the map. Two are located near Marine Drive station in southern Vancouver: Marine Gateway North, and Ashley Mar III, while one, The Stories at South Granville Station, is in Fairview.

Buildings taller than 100 m (328 ft) in Vancouver. An asterisk (*) next to the name of the building indicates it is located outside the map.
- 1950s and before
- 1960s
- 1970s
- 1980s
- 1990s
- 2000s
- 2010s
- 2020s
1 Living Shangri-La
2 Paradox Hotel Vancouver
3 The Butterfly
4 One Burrard Place
5 The Stack
6 The Private Residences at Hotel Georgia
7 Vancouver House
8 One Wall Centre
9 Shaw Tower
10 Harbour Centre
11 MNP Tower
12 The Melville
13 Royal Centre
14 Fairmont Pacific Rim
15 Bentall 5
16 Park Place
17 Granville Square
18 Scotia Tower
19 Four Bentall Centre
20 Telus Garden Residential Tower
21 Alberni by Kengo Kuma
22 Peter Wall Mansion & Residences
23 TD Tower
24 Capitol Residences
25 Patina
26 The Charleson
27 The Stories at South Granville Station*
28 The Mark
29 B6
30 Vancouver Centre II
31 Woodward's 43
32 Three Bentall Centre
33 The Pacific in Vancouver
34 Jameson House
35 The Ritz Coal Harbour
36 320 Granville
37 West One
38 Cathedral Place
39 1335 Howe
40 Marriott Pinnacle Hotel
41 The Exchange
42 Tate on Howe
43 West Pender Place 1
44 Sheraton West Tower
45 Hotel Vancouver
46 Venus
47 Hyatt Regency Vancouver
48 601 West Hastings
49 Residences on Georgia (West)
50 Marine Gateway North*
51 The Pinnacle
52 Callisto
53 Dolce
54 Landmark 33
55 Residences on Georgia (East)
56 Two Harbour Green
57 Board of Trade Building
58 Oceanic Plaza
59 Arthur Erickson Place
60 Quay West Tower I
61 Ashley Mar III*
62 Elan
63 Classico
64 Aquilini Centre West
65 FortisBC Centre
66 Paris Place
67 HSBC Building
68 Canaccord Tower
69 Coast Plaza Hotel
70 Carmana Plaza
71 Guinness Tower
72 Hudson

== Tallest buildings ==
This list ranks completed buildings in Vancouver that stand at least 100 m (328 ft) tall as of 2026, based on standard height measurement. This includes spires and architectural details but does not include antenna masts. The “Year” column indicates the year of completion. Buildings tied in height are sorted by year of completion with earlier buildings ranked first, and then alphabetically.

Was the tallest building in Vancouver upon completion

Rank	Name	Image	Location	Height m (ft)	Floors	Year	Purpose	Notes
1	Living Shangri-La		1128 West Georgia Street 49°17′08″N 123°07′25″W	200.9 (659)	62	2009	Mixed-use	2nd tallest building in British Columbia and 39th tallest building in Canada. Contains a hotel on the first 15 floors and residential units on the rest of the tower. Will soon rebrand to the Hyatt Vancouver Downtown Alberni. Tallest building completed in Vancouver in the 2000s.
2	Paradox Hotel Vancouver		1151 West Georgia Street 49°17′12″N 123°07′26″W	187.8 (616)	60	2016	Mixed-use	Tied with Altus in Burnaby for the third tallest building in British Columbia. Tallest building completed in Vancouver in the 2010s. Mixed-use hotel and residential building.
3	The Butterfly		969 Burrard Street 49°16′55″N 123°07′36″W	178.6 (586)	57	2024	Residential	Tallest building completed in Vancouver in the 2020s.
4	One Burrard Place	–	1281 Hornby Street 49°16′40″N 123°07′47″W	167.6 (550)	54	2021	Residential	
5	The Stack	–	1133 Melville Street 49°17′14″N 123°07′22″W	162.3 (532)	38	2023	Office	Tallest office building in Vancouver.
6	The Private Residences at Hotel Georgia		667 Howe Street 49°17′02″N 123°07′07″W	158.5 (520)	48	2012	Mixed-use	
7	Vancouver House		1480 Howe Street 49°16′30″N 123°07′52″W	150.3 (493)	49	2019	Residential	Features a top-heavy design that is unique in Vancouver.
8	One Wall Centre		1000 Burrard Street 49°16′50″N 123°07′32″W	149.8 (491)	47	2001	Mixed-use	This building is also known as the Sheraton Wall Centre. Tallest building in Vancouver from 2001 to 2009.
9	Shaw Tower		1067 West Cordova Street 49°17′18″N 123°07′04″W	149.0 (488.8)	41	2004	Mixed-use	Also known as Rogers Tower.
10	Harbour Centre		555 West Hastings Street 49°17′05″N 123°06′43″W	147.0 (482.3)	40	1977	Office	Tallest building in Vancouver from 1977 to 2001. Tallest office building in the city from 1977 to 2023. Tallest building completed in Vancouver in the 1970s.
11	MNP Tower		1021 West Hastings Street 49°17′15″N 123°07′04″W	143.1 (469)	36	2015	Office	Seeking Platinum LEED certification, will be Gold LEED at least.
12	The Melville		1189 Melville Street 49°17′16″N 123°07′25″W	141.4 (464)	43	2007	Residential	Tallest all-residential tower in Vancouver. The building also has the tallest rooftop pool in the city.
13	Royal Centre		1055 West Georgia Street 49°17′07″N 123°07′18″W	141.0 (462.6)	37	1973	Office	Tallest building in Vancouver from 1973 to 1977. Also known as the RBC Tower or Royal Bank Tower.
14	Fairmont Pacific Rim		1038 Canada Place 49°17′17″N 123°06′59″W	140.3 (460)	44	2010	Mixed-use	
15	Bentall 5		550 Burrard Street 49°17′09″N 123°07′05″W	140.1 (460)	34	2007	Office	Also known as B5.
16	Park Place		666 Burrard Street 49°17′06″N 123°07′09″W	140.0 (459.3)	35	1984	Office	Largest office building in British Columbia by floor area, with 64,856 square metres (698,104 sq ft). Tallest building completed in Vancouver in the 1980s.
17	Granville Square		200 Granville Street 49°17′12″N 123°06′44″W	138.4 (454)	30	1973	Office	Also known as 200 Granville Square. The roof of the building features Vancouver Harbour Control Tower, the highest air traffic control tower in the world.
18	Scotia Tower		650 West Georgia Street 49°16′54″N 123°07′04″W	138.0 (452.8)	34	1977	Office	
19	Four Bentall Centre		1055 Dunsmuir Street 49°17′11″N 123°07′17″W	138.0 (452.8)	35	1981	Office	
20	Telus Garden Residential Tower		777 Richards Street 49°16′50″N 123°07′04″W	135.6 (445)	46	2016	Residential	LEED Platinum for Office Building and LEED Gold certification for Residential Tower as part of the new downtown Telus headquarters project.
21	Alberni by Kengo Kuma		1550 Alberni Street 49°17′23″N 123°07′53″W	133.1 (437)	43	2023	Residential	
22	Peter Wall Mansion & Residences	–	1310 Richards Street 49°16′28″N 123°07′33″W	127.3 (418)	43	2017	Residential	Also known as 1300 Richards Street.
23	TD Tower		700 West Georgia Street 49°16′58″N 123°07′09″W	127.1 (417)	30	1972	Office	This building is also known as the Toronto Dominion Tower. Briefly the tallest building in Vancouver from 1972 to 1973.
24	Capitol Residences		833 Seymour Street 49°16′50″N 123°07′11″W	126.2 (414)	43	2011	Residential	
25	Patina		955 Burrard Street 49°16′56″N 123°07′34″W	126.2 (414)	42	2011	Residential	
26	The Charleson	–	499 Pacific Street 49°16′26″N 123°07′37″W	125.0 (410)	42	2018	Residential	
27	The Stories at South Granville Station	–	1477 West Broadway 49°15′50″N 123°08′17″W	125 (410)	39	2025	Residential	
28	The Mark		1372 Seymour Street 49°16′29″N 123°07′39″W	123.4 (405)	41	2013	Residential	
29	B6	–	1090 West Pender Street 49°17′14″N 123°07′13″W	123 (404)	31	2024	Office	Also known as Bentall 6.
30	Vancouver Centre II	–	753 Seymour Street 49°16′53″N 123°07′06″W	122.8 (403)	33	2023	Office	
31	Woodward's 43		128 West Cordova Street 49°16′59″N 123°06′29″W	122.3 (401)	41	2010	Residential	This building is also known as W43 or the W Building.
32	Three Bentall Centre		595 Burrard Street 49°17′10″N 123°07′12″W	121.9 (400)	32	1974	Office	Also known as the Bank of Montreal Tower.
33	The Pacific in Vancouver	–	889 Pacific Street 49°16′35″N 123°07′51″W	118.7 (389)	39	2021	Residential	
34	Jameson House		838 West Hastings Street 49°17′10″N 123°06′56″W	118.6 (389)	38	2011	Mixed-use	
35	The Ritz Coal Harbour		1211 Melville Street 49°17′18″N 123°07′27″W	118.3 (388)	37	2008	Residential	
36	320 Granville	–	320 Granville Street 49°17′08″N 123°06′46″W	117.3 (385)	30	2023	Office	
37	West One		1408 Strathmore Mews 49°16′22″N 123°07′37″W	117 (384)	38	2002	Residential	This building is also known as Beach Crescent - West One.
38	Cathedral Place		925 West Georgia Street 49°17′03″N 123°07′12″W	116.4 (382)	23	1991	Office	Tallest building completed in Vancouver in the 1990s.
39	1335 Howe	–	1335 Howe Street 49°16′35″N 123°07′47″W	115.3 (378)	40	2022	Residential	
40	Marriott Pinnacle Hotel		1128 West Hastings Street 49°17′16″N 123°07′14″W	114.3 (375)	35	2000	Mixed-use	
41	The Exchange	–	475 Howe Street 49°17′09″N 123°06′57″W	114.3 (375)	31	2017	Office	
42	Tate on Howe	–	1265 Howe Street 49°16′38″N 123°07′43″W	114.3 (375)	40	2019	Residential	
43	West Pender Place 1		1499 West Pender Street 49°17′24″N 123°07′42″W	112.8 (370)	36	2011	Residential	
44	Sheraton Wall Centre Hotel - West Tower		1088 Burrard Street 49°16′49″N 123°07′38″W	110.9 (364)	35	1994	Hotel	
45	Hotel Vancouver		900 West Georgia Street 49°17′02″N 123°07′15″W	110.6 (363)	17	1939	Hotel	Tallest building in Vancouver from 1939 to 1972. Tallest building completed in Vancouver in the 1930s.
46	Venus		1239 West Georgia Street 49°17′16″N 123°07′32″W	109.4 (359)	34	2000	Residential	
47	Hyatt Regency Vancouver		655 Burrard Street 49°17′07″N 123°07′14″W	108.8 (357)	35	1973	Hotel	This building is also known as the Hyatt Regency Hotel or the Hyatt Regency Vancouver-Royal Centre.
48	601 West Hastings	–	601 West Hastings Street 49°17′06″N 123°06′46″W	108.8 (357)	25	2022	Office	
49	Residences on Georgia (West)		1288 West Georgia Street 49°17′15″N 123°07′36″W	108 (354)	36	1998	Residential	
50	Marine Gateway North		8400 Cambie Street 49°12′36″N 123°07′00″W	107 (351)	30	2015	Residential	The first building in Vancouver exceeding 100 metres (328 ft) in height that is located outside of Downtown Vancouver.
51	The Pinnacle		939 Homer Street 49°16′41″N 123°07′11″W	106.1 (348)	36	1996	Residential	
52	Callisto		1281 West Cordova Street 49°17′24″N 123°07′24″W	106.1 (348)	35	2004	Residential	
53	Dolce		535 Smithe Street 49°16′46″N 123°07′10″W	106.1 (348)	31	2010	Residential	
54	Landmark 33		1009 Expo Boulevard 49°16′30″N 123°07′03″W	106 (348)	35	1998	Residential	Also known as Marina Pointe - Landmark 33.
55	Residences on Georgia (East)		1200 West Georgia Street 49°17′13″N 123°07′33″W	106 (348)	36	1998	Residential	
56	Two Harbour Green		1139 West Cordova Street 49°17′20″N 123°07′12″W	105.1 (345)	31	2008	Residential	
57	Board of Trade Building		1177 West Hastings Street 49°17′19″N 123°07′18″W	104.2 (342)	27	1968	Office	Also known as 1177 West Hastings at Columbia Centre. Tallest building completed in Vancouver in the 1960s.
58	Oceanic Plaza		1066 West Hastings Street 49°17′15″N 123°07′08″W	104.2 (342)	26	1977	Office	
59	Arthur Erickson Place		1075 West Georgia Street 49°17′09″N 123°07′20″W	103.6 (340)	27	1968	Office	Originally known as the MacMillan Bloedel Building.
60	Quay West Tower I		1033 Marinaside Crescent 49°16′24″N 123°06′59″W	103 (338)	35	2002	Residential	This building is also known as Marina Crescent - Quay West I or QuayWest I at Concord Pacific Place.
61	Ashley Mar III	–	8495 Cambie Street 49°12′31″N 123°07′04″W	103 (338)	31	2025	Residential	
62	Elan		1255 Seymour Street 49°16′34″N 123°07′35″W	102.7 (337)	34	2008	Residential	
63	Classico	–	1328 West Pender Street 49°17′20″N 123°07′35″W	102.1 (335)	37	2003	Residential	
64	Aquilini Centre West	–	89 West Georgia Street 49°16′40″N 123°06′35″W	101.5 (333)	25	2015	Residential	
65	FortisBC Centre		1111 West Georgia Street 49°17′10″N 123°07′23″W	101.2 (332)	24	1992	Office	Formerly known as the Terasen Centre and was previously the site of the Rayonier Building (originally known as the Alaska White Pine Building) from 1954 to 1990.
66	Paris Place		181 Keefer Place 49°16′49″N 123°06′30″W	100.5 (330)	33	1995	Residential	
67	HSBC Building		885 West Georgia Street 49°17′02″N 123°07′09″W	100.5 (330)	23	1987	Office	
68	Canaccord Tower		609 Granville Street 49°17′01″N 123°07′01″W	100.3 (329)	24	1981	Office	This building is also known as Canaccord Place or 609 Granville at Pacific Centre.
69	Coast Plaza Hotel		1763 Comox Street 49°17′19″N 123°08′19″W	100.2 (329)	32	1969	Hotel	
70	Carmana Plaza		1128 Alberni Street 49°17′09″N 123°07′30″W	100 (330)	34	1999	Residential	
71	Guinness Tower		1055 West Hastings Street 49°17′16″N 123°07′06″W	100 (330)	25	1969	Residential	
72	Hudson	–	610 Granville Street 49°17′00″N 123°06′59″W	100 (330)	34	2006	Residential	

== Tallest under construction ==
The following table lists buildings under construction in Vancouver that are expected to be at least 100 m (328 ft) tall as of 2026, based on standard height measurement.

Name	Height m (ft)	Floors	Year	Notes
Sen̓áḵw Tower 7	158.6 (520)	53	2026	
Piero Lissoni X Oakridge	137.5 (451)	45	2026	
1515 by Bosa	133 (436)	40	2027	
508 Drake Street	125.2 (411)	39	2026	
Sen̓áḵw Tower 3	120 (390)	41	2026	
Oakridge X Westbank	115.1 (378)	34	2026	
Two Burrard Place	112.2 (368)	35	2026	
Sergio Castiglia X Oakridge	109.6 (360)	36	2026	
1099 Harwood	101.5 (333)	33	2026	
1098 Harwood	101.5 (333)	33	2026	

== Tallest demolished ==
This table lists buildings in Vancouver that were demolished or destroyed and at one time stood at least 100 metres (328 ft) in height.

Name	Image	Height m (ft)	Floors	Year completed	Year demolished	Notes
Empire Landmark Hotel		120.1 (394)	42	1973	2019	This building was the tallest free standing hotel in the city. This building was often referred to by its original name, the Sheraton Landmark. The hotel and its restaurant closed on September 30, 2017, and the building was demolished, floor by floor between March 2018 and May 2019.

== Timeline of tallest buildings ==
This is a list of buildings that in the past held the title of tallest building in Vancouver.

Name	Image	Address	Years as tallest	Height m (ft)	Floors	Notes
Dominion Building		207 W. Hastings St.	1910–1912	53.3 (175)	14	
Sun Tower		100 W. Pender St.	1912–1930	84.1 (276)	17	
Marine Building		355 Burrard St.	1930–1939	97.8 (321)	21	
Hotel Vancouver		900 W. Georgia St.	1939–1972	111.0 (364.2)	17	
TD Tower		700 W. Georgia St.	1972–1973	127.1 (417)	30	
Royal Centre		1055 W. Georgia St.	1973–1977	141.4 (464)	37	
Harbour Centre		555 W. Hastings St.	1977–2001	146.6 (481)	28	
One Wall Centre		1000 Burrard St.	2001–2008	149.7 (491)	48	
Living Shangri-La		1120 W. Georgia St.	2008–present	200.9 (659)	62	

== See also ==
- Architecture of Vancouver
- List of heritage buildings in Vancouver
- List of tallest buildings in Canada
- List of tallest buildings in British Columbia
- List of tallest buildings in Burnaby
