= Scotia Tower =

Skyscraper located at 650 West Georgia Street in Downtown Vancouver

Coordinates: 49.281960°N 123.117992°W

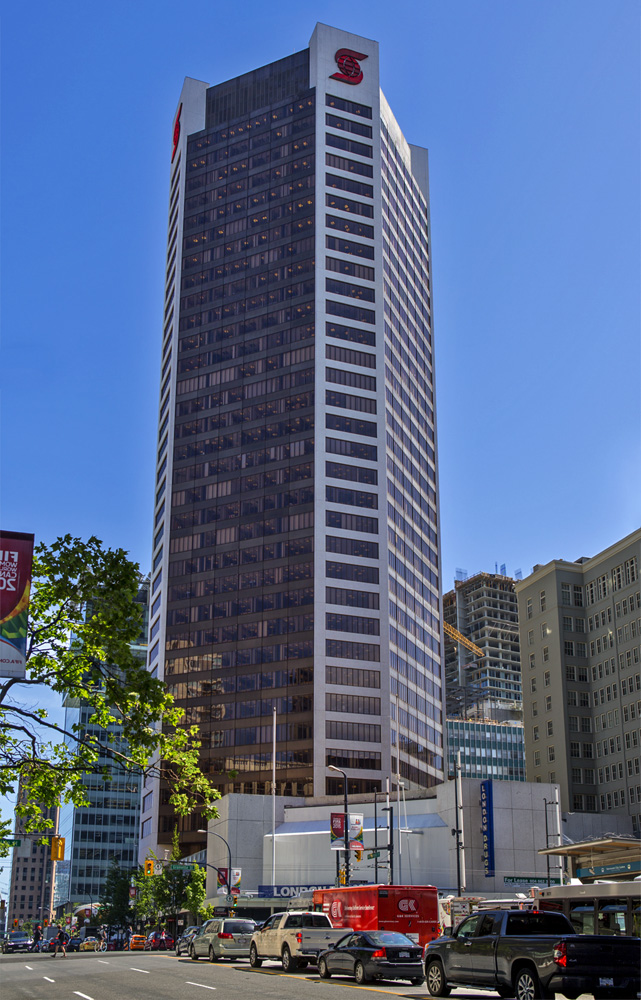

General information
- Location: 650 West Georgia Street, Vancouver, British Columbia
- Opened: 8 June 1977

Technical details
- Floor count: 35

Design and construction
- Architect: Webb Zerafa and Menkès

Scotia Tower is a 35-storey office tower in Vancouver, British Columbia, Canada. built for the Bank of Nova Scotia. The project was announced in 1971, construction began in 1974, and the building opened officially on 8 June 1977. Architects for the project were Zebb Zerafa and Menkès of Toronto. The building was constructed concurrently with Scotia Centre in Calgary, and the designs of the two towers followed similar concepts. The Scotia Tower was a controversial building at the time of its construction, as the project involved the demolition of the historic Birks Building and Allen/Strand Theatre.

== History ==
The 15th tallest building in the city, it stands at 138 m or 35 storeys tall and completed in 1977 and is a landmark skyscraper near the end of the central business district. The building houses Scotiabank operations for British Columbia and the underground Vancouver Centre, with its various shops and attendant street retail and theatres. The malls are linked to Pacific Centre and a SkyTrain subway station via subterranean passages beneath Georgia and Granville Streets.

The Georgia and Granville corner of the site was the former location of the Birks Store in Vancouver, an ornate Edwardian edifice that was torn down in 1974 to make way for the construction of Scotia Tower and Vancouver Centre. Birks was the first tenant in the new corner-retail location after the centre's construction but has since moved to Granville and West Hastings; that location is now the main downtown store of London Drugs. The decision to demolish the Birks Building sparked outrage and protest when it was announced in 1971. New Democratic Party MLA Robert Arthur Williams started the Save Our Birks Building Committee and served as its chairman. Williams said, "it's not good enough to have Toronto or some eastern developer tell us what the heart of our city should be." The committee also included Dr Harold D. Kalman, a professor of art history at the University of British Columbia.

The Georgia Street side of the Scotia Tower-Vancouver Centre was the location of the old Strand Theatre, the only one of Vancouver's Theatre Row not directly on Granville Street. That movie house was later replaced by the Vancouver Centre Cinemas (now closed) in 1977.

== See also ==
- List of tallest buildings in Vancouver
