= Empire Landmark Hotel =

Former hotel in Vancouver, British Columbia, Canada

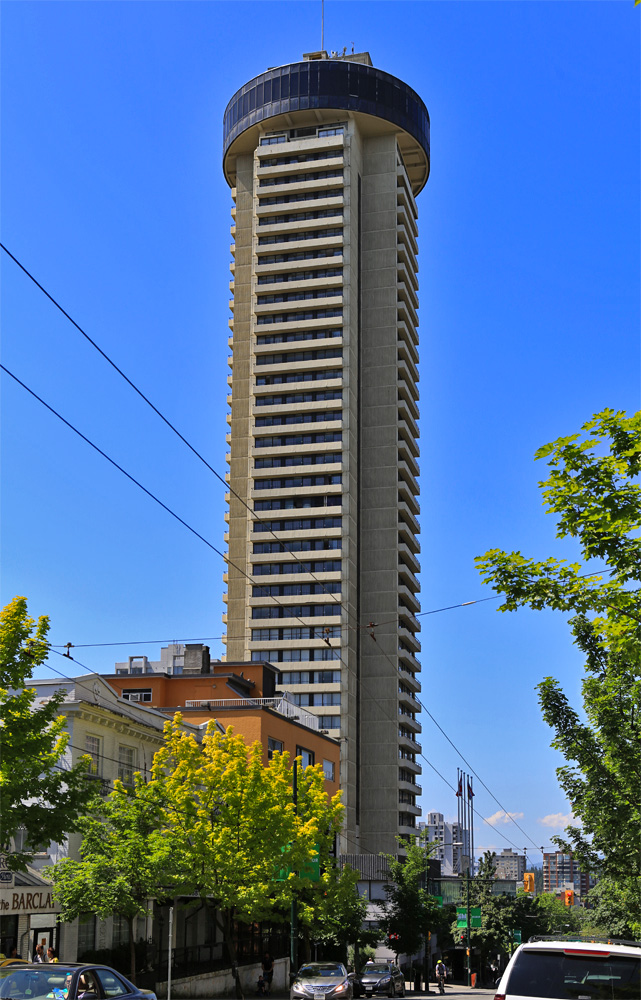
- Interactive map of the Empire Landmark Hotel area

General information
- Status: Demolished
- Type: Hotel
- Architectural style: Modern, Brutalism
- Location: Vancouver, British Columbia
- Coordinates: 49°17′17″N 123°07′51″W
- Opening: January 18, 1974
- Closed: September 30, 2017
- Demolished: March 2018-May 2019

Height
- Architectural: 120.1 m (394.0 ft)

Technical details
- Floor count: 42

Design and construction
- Architects: Lort and Lort
- Developer: Ben Wosk
- Main contractor: Smith Brothers and Wilson

Other information
- Number of rooms: 357
- Number of restaurants: 1

Website
- Official Site

The Empire Landmark Hotel, often referred to by its original name, the Sheraton Landmark, was the tallest hotel in Vancouver, British Columbia. It was located on one of Vancouver's busiest thoroughfares at 1400 Robson Street, in the West End of Downtown Vancouver. The building was revolutionary at the time, as it had a revolving restaurant on its top floor, Cloud 9, which was one of only two revolving restaurants in Vancouver, the other being the Harbour Centre. Between its completion in 1973 and the completion of nearby Bentall Centre in 1974, the Empire Landmark Hotel was the third tallest building in Vancouver.

The skyscraper is the tallest voluntarily demolished building in Canada, overtaking the 88 m (289 ft) tall Old Toronto Star Building that was demolished in 1972.

== History ==
The Sheraton-Landmark Hotel was designed in the then-popular brutalist style by architect Ross Lort and built by Vancouver businessman Ben Wosk, at a cost of $12 million, by the oldest construction company on the West Coast, Smith Bros. & Wilson. Upon completion in 1973, it was the third tallest building in Vancouver at 120.1 m (394 ft) and 42 storeys tall. It was also the tallest building in Vancouver completely devoted to use as a hotel. The hotel had a soft opening in late 1973, its grand opening was held on 18 January 1974.

The hotel suffered a fire in 1976 that sent 25 people to the hospital. Wosk sold the Sheraton Landmark, along with two other local Sheratons he owned (the Sheraton Plaza 500 and the Sheraton Villa Inn in Burnaby) to the Dallas-based Southmark Corp. in 1986 for $48.5 million. Southmark sold the three hotels to Los Angeles-based Daniel Lee two years later, for $82 million. Lee lost the Sheraton Landmark to his creditors, and they sold it to Hong Kong-based Asia Standard International Group in 1997 for $57.75 million. The new owners dropped the Sheraton franchise and renamed the hotel the Empire Landmark Hotel.

=== Demolition ===
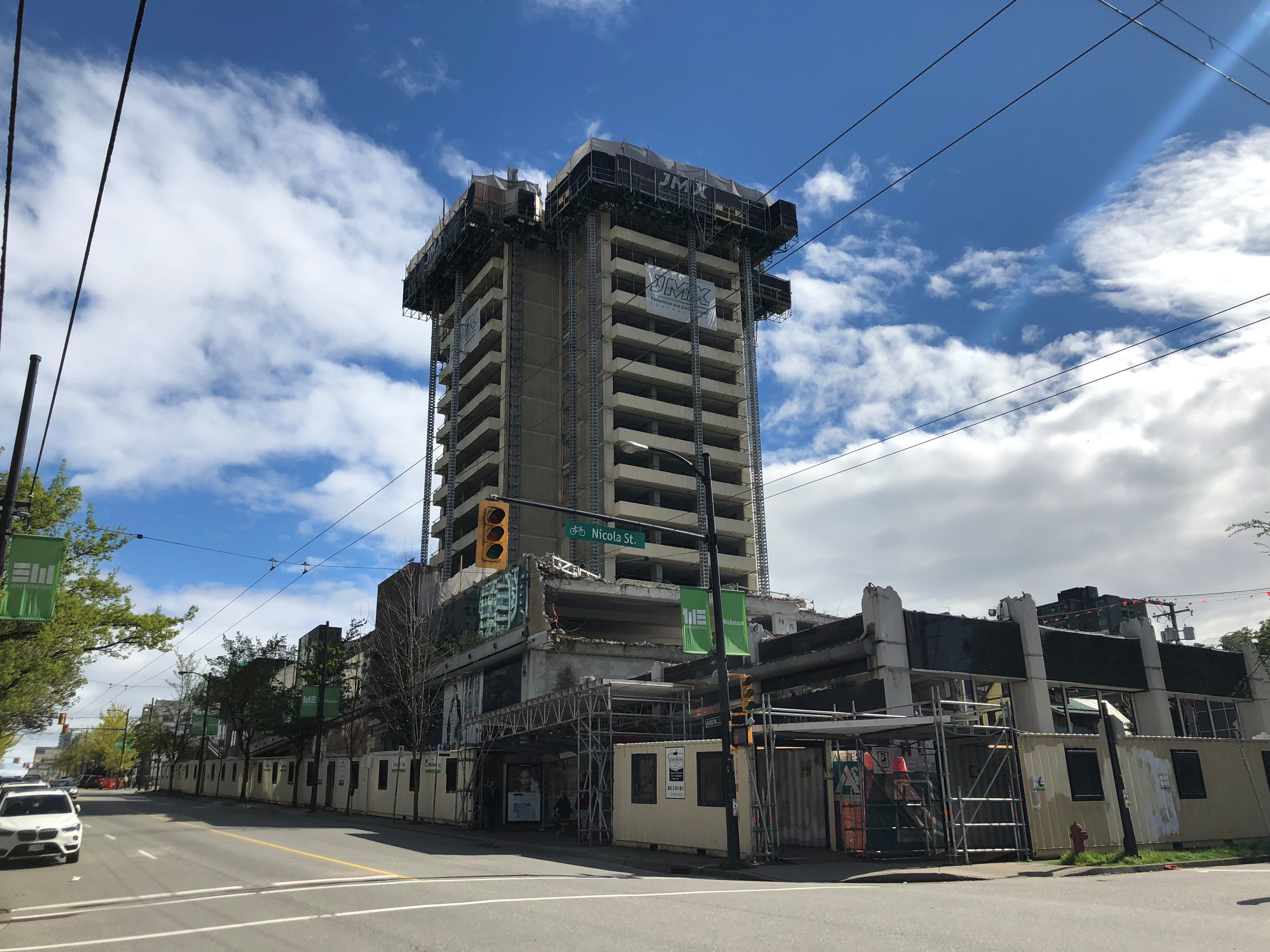
Demolition progress on 19 April 2019.

Due to economic pressures as a result of rising property values within downtown Vancouver, combined with the building's historically unpopular brutalist architecture and relatively small floor space being prohibitive to redevelopment of the original tower into anything but another hotel, it was decided to demolish the Empire Landmark Hotel and redevelop the site.

The hotel and its restaurant closed on September 30, 2017, and the building was demolished, floor by floor, over a period of over a year, beginning in March 2018 and ending in May 2019.

The building was replaced with Landmark On Robson, a mixed-use development consisting of two shorter condominium towers, at 34 and 32 storeys, with 237 market condos, 83 social housing units, and retail and office space on the bottom three floors. Construction on the development was completed in 2024.

== See also ==
- List of tallest buildings in Vancouver
- List of tallest voluntarily demolished buildings
