= Telus Garden =

Mixed-use redevelopment in Vancouver, Canada

TELUS Garden (high-rise)
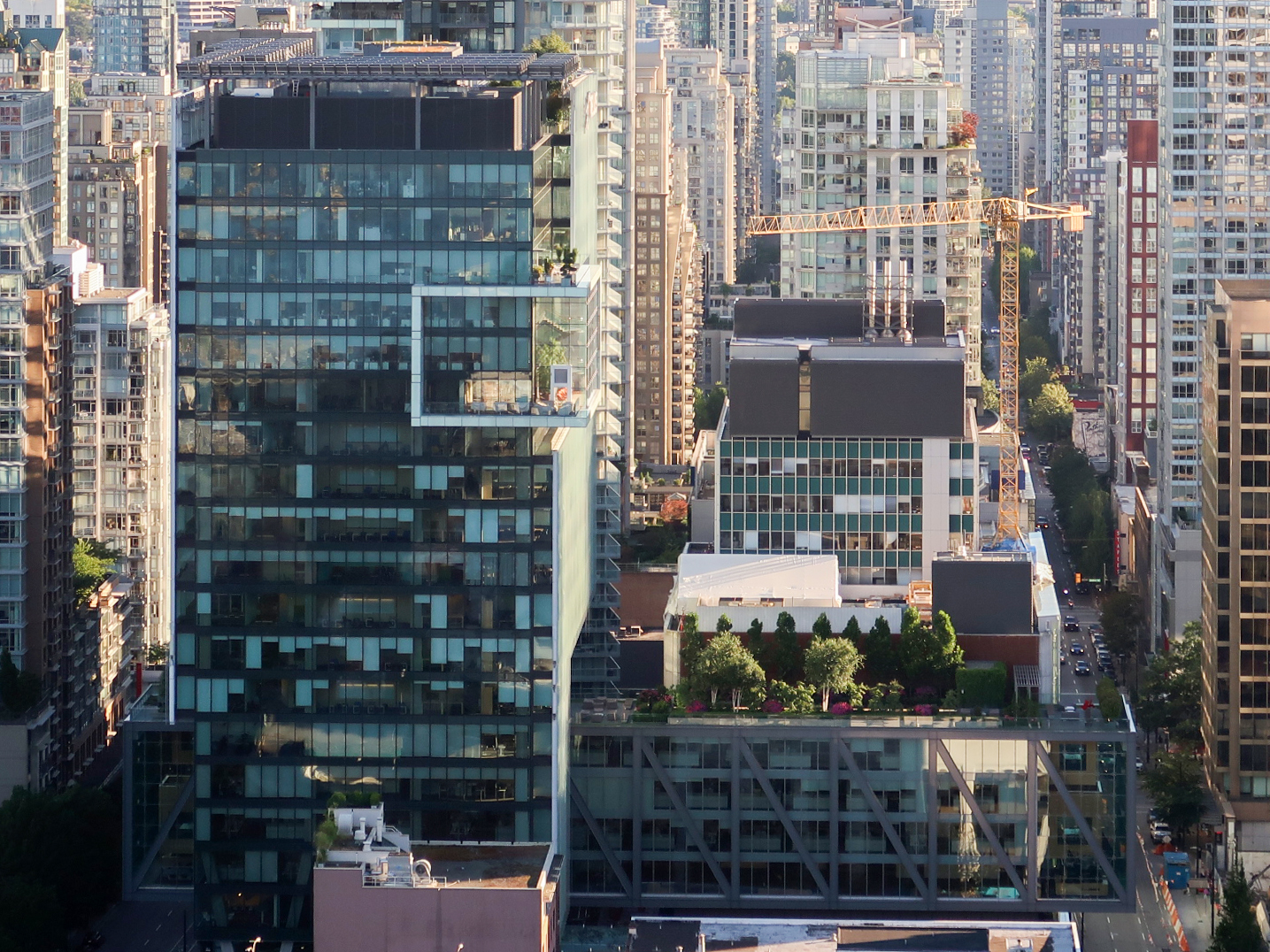
- Exterior of TELUS Garden offices
- Interactive map of the TELUS Garden (high-rise) area

General information
- Status: Completed
- Type: Mixed-use
- Architectural style: Modernist
- Location: 510 W Georgia Street, Vancouver, British Columbia, Canada
- Coordinates: 49.2811°N 123.1171°W
- Construction started: May 2012
- Estimated completion: 2015
- Opening: September 17, 2015
- Cost: $750 million CAD

Height
- Roof: 135.6 m (445 ft)

Technical details
- Floor count: 54
- Floor area: 1,000,000 sq. ft.

Design and construction
- Architect: Gregory Henriquez of Henriquez Partners Architects
- Developer: Westbank Corporation
- Structural engineer: Glotman Simpson

TELUS Garden is a 1,000,000 square foot office mixed-use redevelopment, located in Vancouver, British Columbia, Canada. The two buildings incorporate office, retail and residential space. The residential tower is 135.6 m high. Of the 488,000 square feet of office space, approximately 212,000 square feet will be for Telus.

== Ownership ==
In August 2018, TELUS and Westbank (the joint building owners) announced the building's sale to an unnamed party. TELUS continued to lease space in the building for its head office.

== Building details ==
- Square footage of:
  - The entire project: 1,000,000 square feet
  - The office space (LEED Platinum): 488,000 square feet of office and retail space (457,000 office/31,000 retail)
  - The residential space (LEED Gold): 450,000 square feet of residential space
  - The retail space (LEED Platinum): 40,000 square feet of retail space
  - Number of storeys: 24 floors of office space
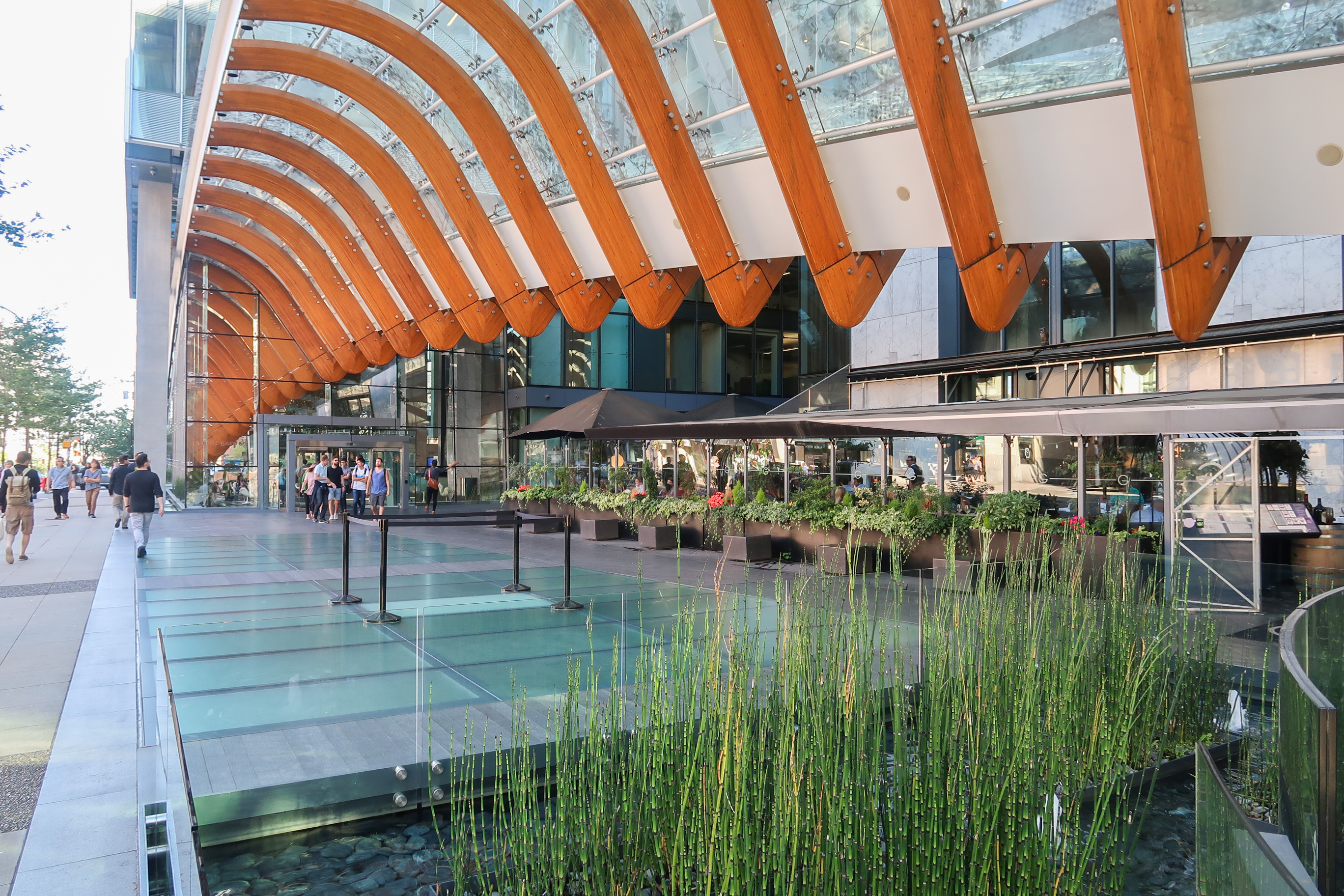
Entrance of the building

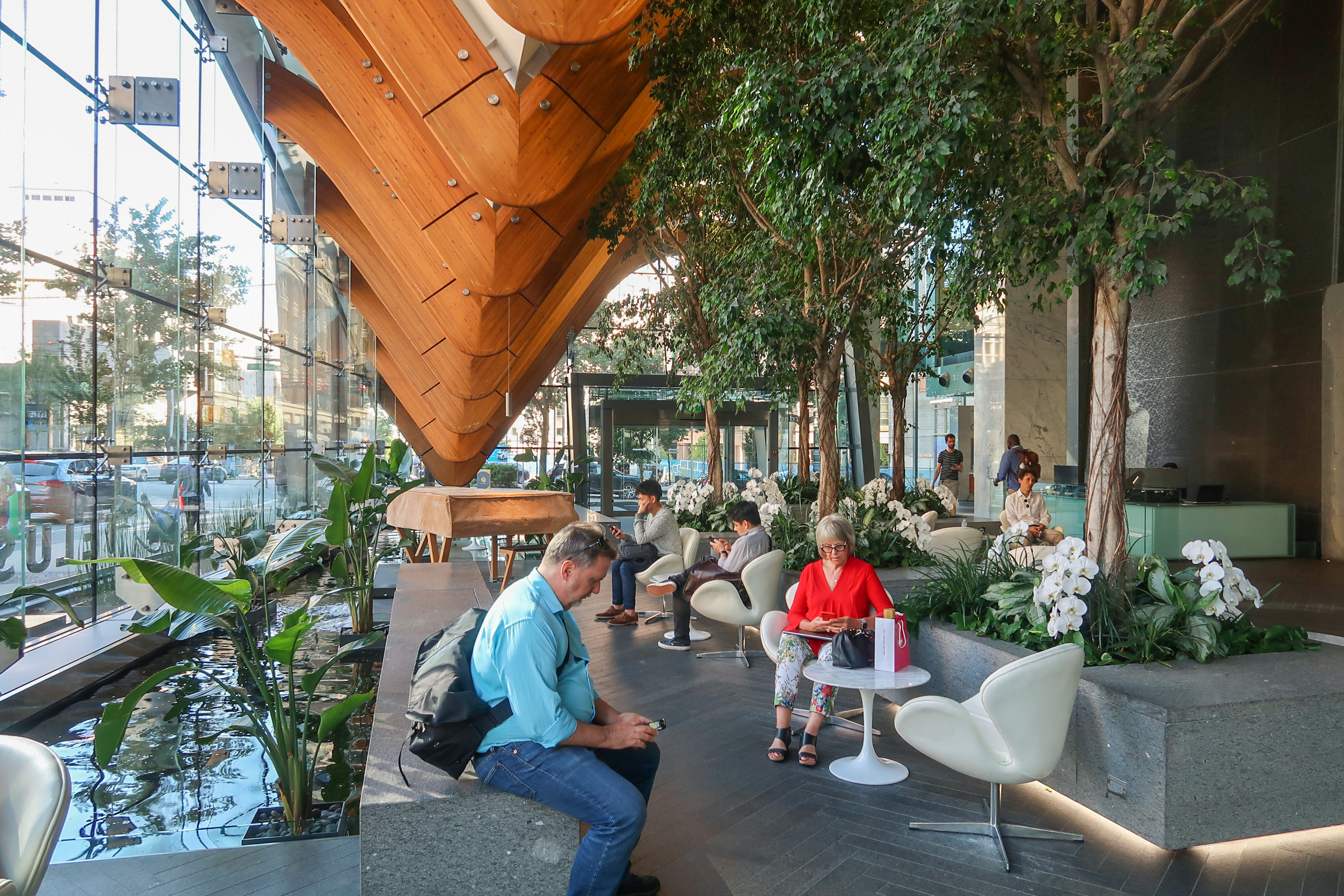
Lobby

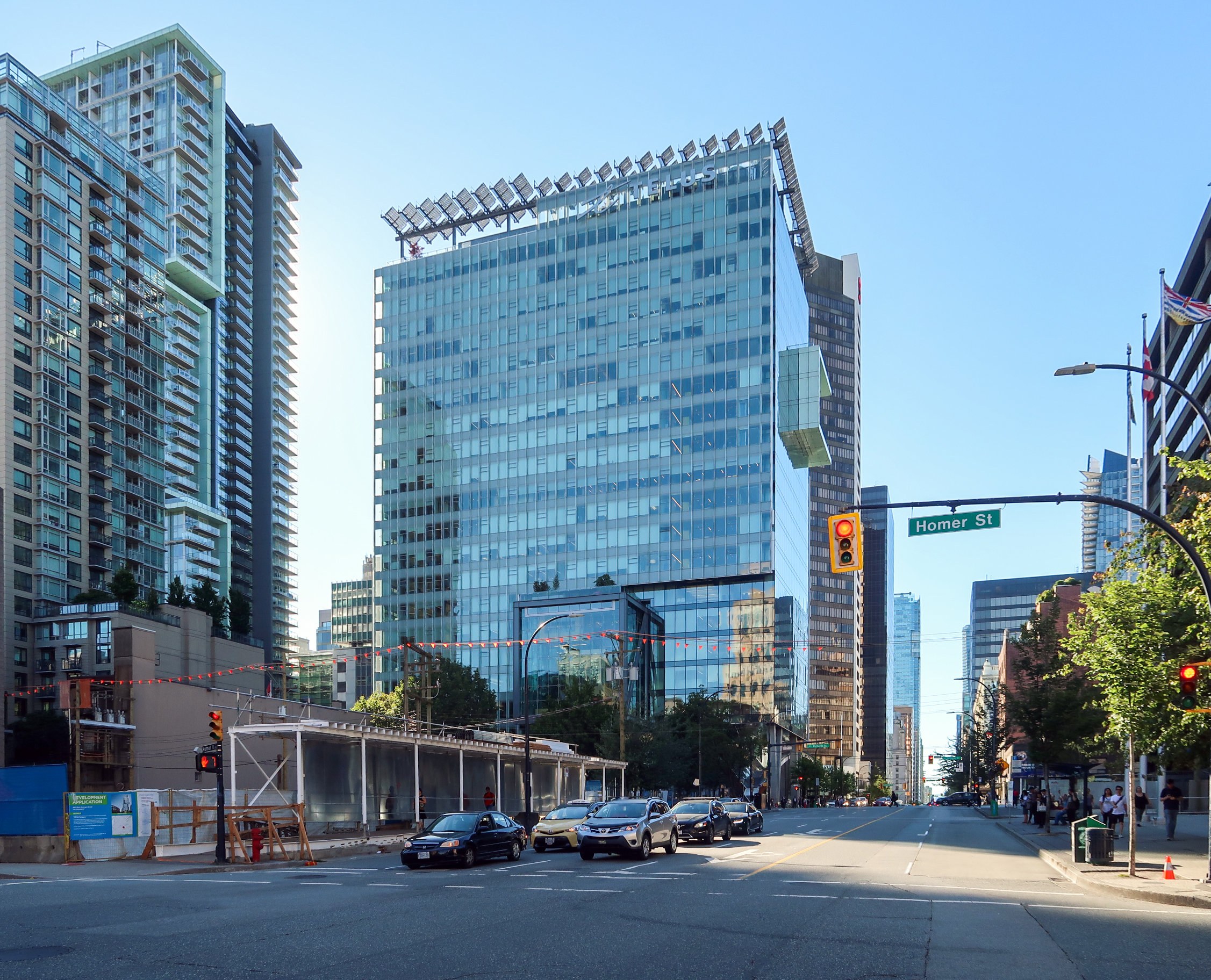
View from W Georgia Street

== See also ==
- List of tallest buildings in Vancouver
