= The Melville =

Skyscraper located in the Coal Harbour neighbourhood of the downtown core of Vancouver

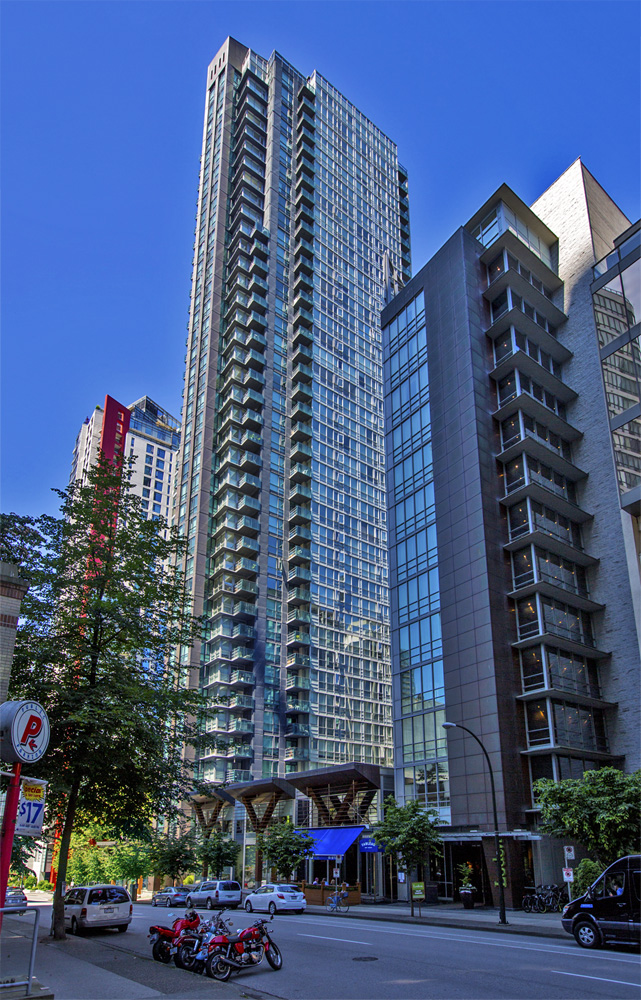
- Interactive map of the The Melville area

General information
- Status: Completed
- Type: Residential
- Location: 1189 Melville Street; Vancouver, British Columbia; V6E 4T8
- Coordinates: 49.2879°N 123.1236°W
- Construction started: 2004
- Completed: 2007

Height
- Architectural: 141.4 metres (464 ft)

Technical details
- Floor count: 43

Design and construction
- Architect: Hewitt + Company Architecture Inc.
- Developer: Amacon

Other information
- Number of units: 232 apartments

The Melville is a skyscraper located at 1189 Melville Street in the Coal Harbour neighbourhood of the city's downtown core of Vancouver, British Columbia, Canada. The building is the sixth tallest building in the city. The Melville is also the tallest fully residential building in Vancouver.

== See also ==
- List of tallest buildings in Vancouver
