= Fairmont Pacific Rim =

Hotel in Vancouver, Canada (opened 2010)

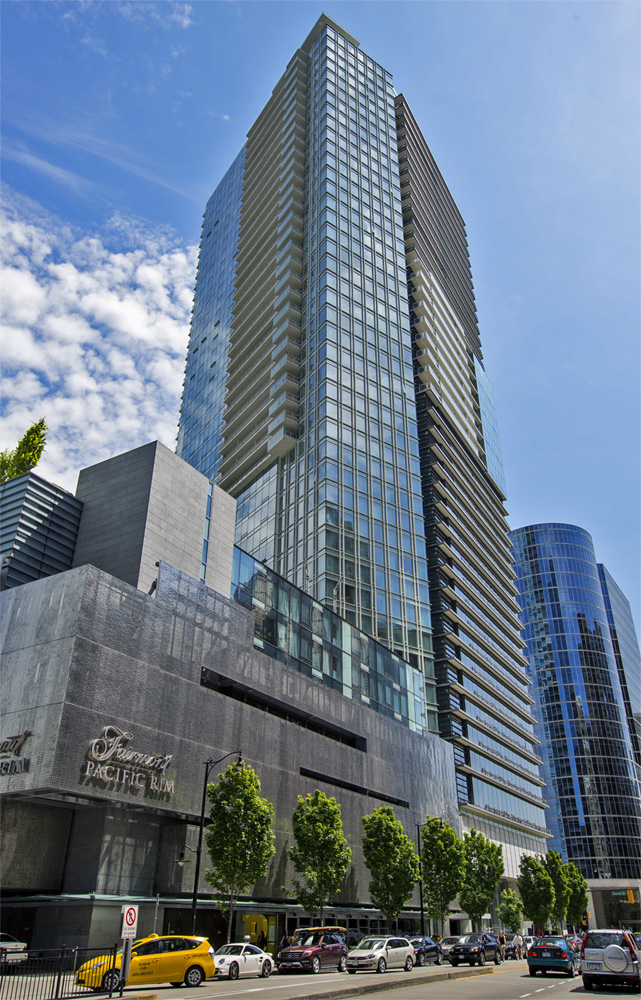
- Fairmont Pacific Rim
- Interactive map of the Fairmont Pacific Rim area

General information
- Architectural style: Modern
- Location: 1038 Canada Place, Vancouver, British Columbia, Canada
- Coordinates: 49°17′17″N 123°6′59″W
- Opening: February 4, 2010
- Operator: Fairmont Hotels & Resorts

Height
- Architectural: 139.6 m (458 ft)

Technical details
- Floor count: 44 (22 hotel)

Design and construction
- Architect: James KM Cheng Architects Inc.
- Developer: Westbank & Peterson Group

Other information
- Number of rooms: 377

Website
- Official Site

Fairmont Pacific Rim is an upscale hotel and condominium building in Vancouver, British Columbia, Canada. It stands at 140 m or 44 storeys tall and was completed just prior to the 2010 Winter Olympics on February 4, 2010.

== History ==
The skyscraper, which is part of the Fairmont Hotels and Resorts chain, is at 1038 Canada Place in Downtown Vancouver in the Coal Harbour neighbourhood by the Burrard Inlet waterfront. Right beside the Rogers Tower, it is also attached to the West Building of the Vancouver Convention & Exhibition Centre. In addition, it is near the Waterfront Station. The southern and eastern exteriors are wrapped with an art installation of a Liam Gillick poem. Fairmont Pacific Rim was developed by Westbank Corp. and the Peterson Group with architecture by James KM Cheng Architects Inc.

This is the fourth Fairmont Hotel in the Vancouver Metropolitan Area. The hotel occupies the first 22 floors of the 44-storey building, with the remaining floors being condominiums. There are a total of 175 residential condominium units beginning from the 23rd floor. The entrance for the residential units is at 1011 Cordova Street West.

The condominiums were pre-sold in 2007, at a price of $2,100 per square foot (equivalent to $3,100 in 2025), one of the highest in Canada at the time.

Glee actor Cory Monteith was found dead in his hotel room on July 13, 2013. He was 31 years old. His cause of death was a toxic overdose of heroin and alcohol.

== See also ==
- List of tallest buildings in Vancouver
