= Woodward's 43 =

Mixed-use skyscraper in Vancouver, British Columbia

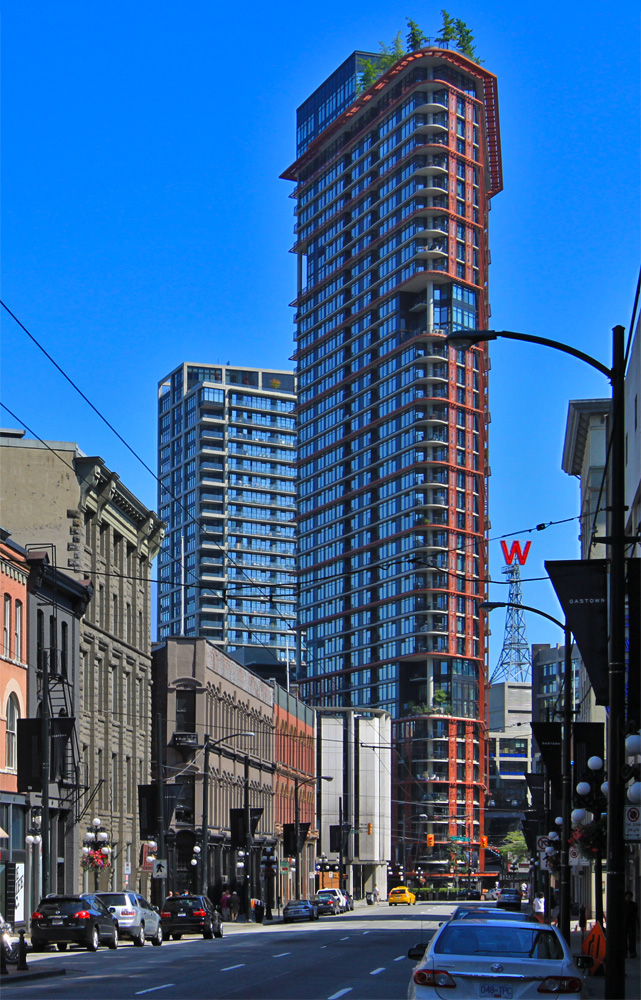
- Interactive map of the Woodward's 43 area
- Alternative names: W43, W Building

General information
- Type: Mixed-use: residential, commercial
- Architectural style: Postmodern / Structural Expressionism
- Location: 128 West Cordova Street; Vancouver, British Columbia, V6B 0E6
- Coordinates: 49°16′58.6″N 123°6′29.1″W
- Construction started: 2006
- Completed: 2010

Height
- Roof: 122.3 m (401 ft)

Technical details
- Floor count: 37 + 2 below grade
- Floor area: 36,253 m^{2} (390,220 ft^{2})
- Lifts/elevators: 3

Design and construction
- Architect: Henriquez Partners Architects
- Developer: W Redevelopment Group, Inc.
- Main contractor: Intertech Construction Ltd.
- Designations: LEED Silver

Other information
- Number of units: 366 apartments
- Parking: 371 parking spaces

Woodward's 43, also known as W43 or the W Building, is a 122.3 m (401 ft) tall mixed-use skyscraper located in the Downtown Eastside of Vancouver, British Columbia, Canada.

== Description ==
The building was strongly influenced by New York's landmark Flatiron Building (Daniel Burnham, 1902), especially in the building's roof cornice. The building's design is inspired by its historical context, specifically the neighbouring Dominion Building. The exterior steel skeleton of the screens evokes the steel construction method used in Vancouver in the early 20th century. The roof of the building features an outdoor patio with a small pool and an outdoor garden.

== History ==
Since the bankruptcy of Woodward's in 1993, the original Woodward's Building remained vacant except for a housing occupation in 2002 that initiated the redevelopment process. In 2003, the City of Vancouver, led by City Council member Jim Green, purchased the original Woodward's Building from the province for $5 million and began a public consultation process, asking the community what they wanted from the redevelopment. After a two-stage competition between three developers in September 2004, the city selected Westbank Projects/Peterson Investment Group to develop the project with the architecture firm of Henriquez Partners led by Gregory Henriquez and structural engineers Glotman Simpson Consulting Engineers. The 400 million dollars, nearly one million square foot project, includes 536 market housing units, 125 singles non-market housing units to be operated by PHS Community Services, 75 family non-market housing units to be handled by Affordable Housing Society, Nesters Market, London Drugs, TD Canada Trust, the National Film Board of Canada and civic offices, a daycare, public atrium and plaza, and a new 130,000 square foot addition to Simon Fraser University 's downtown campus, the SFU School for Contemporary Arts.

The redevelopment was seen by many as a key to revitalizing the Downtown Eastside. However, the demolition of the structure in 2006 and redevelopment of the site has been met with much local resistance from the neighbourhood's existing residents. Woodward's redevelopment is complete, with many residents and businesses in the buildings.

The market housing units constructed in the building feature both modern-look finishes and vintage analog thermostats. The oldest part of the complex (built 1903–1908) was restored and serves as a non-profit office and community space (31,500 sqft), with tenants including W2 Community Media Arts. The development permit for construction was issued on January 26, 2007, and while substantial completion was scheduled for June 2010, delays pushed that completion date back to September 2010.

The "W" neon sign, which topped the building on the Eiffel Tower replica, was removed before the demolition and was replicated and re-installed on January 9, 2010, now boasting energy-saving LED lights. The original W is now displayed in the open area next to The Charles Bar at the new Woodward's Building. In 2008 the Vancouver artist Stan Douglas completed a 30' by 50' image on glass depicting the Gastown Riots of 1971. Together with a basketball hoop, the oversized photograph has become the central focus within the atrium of the new Woodward's Redevelopment.

The redevelopment of the Woodward's site had the side-effect of displacing some of Vancouver's sex worker population; however, prostitutes remain in the Downtown Eastside area.

== See also ==
- List of tallest buildings in Vancouver
