= Paradox Hotel Vancouver =

Hotel skyscraper in British Columbia, Canada

Paradox Vancouver
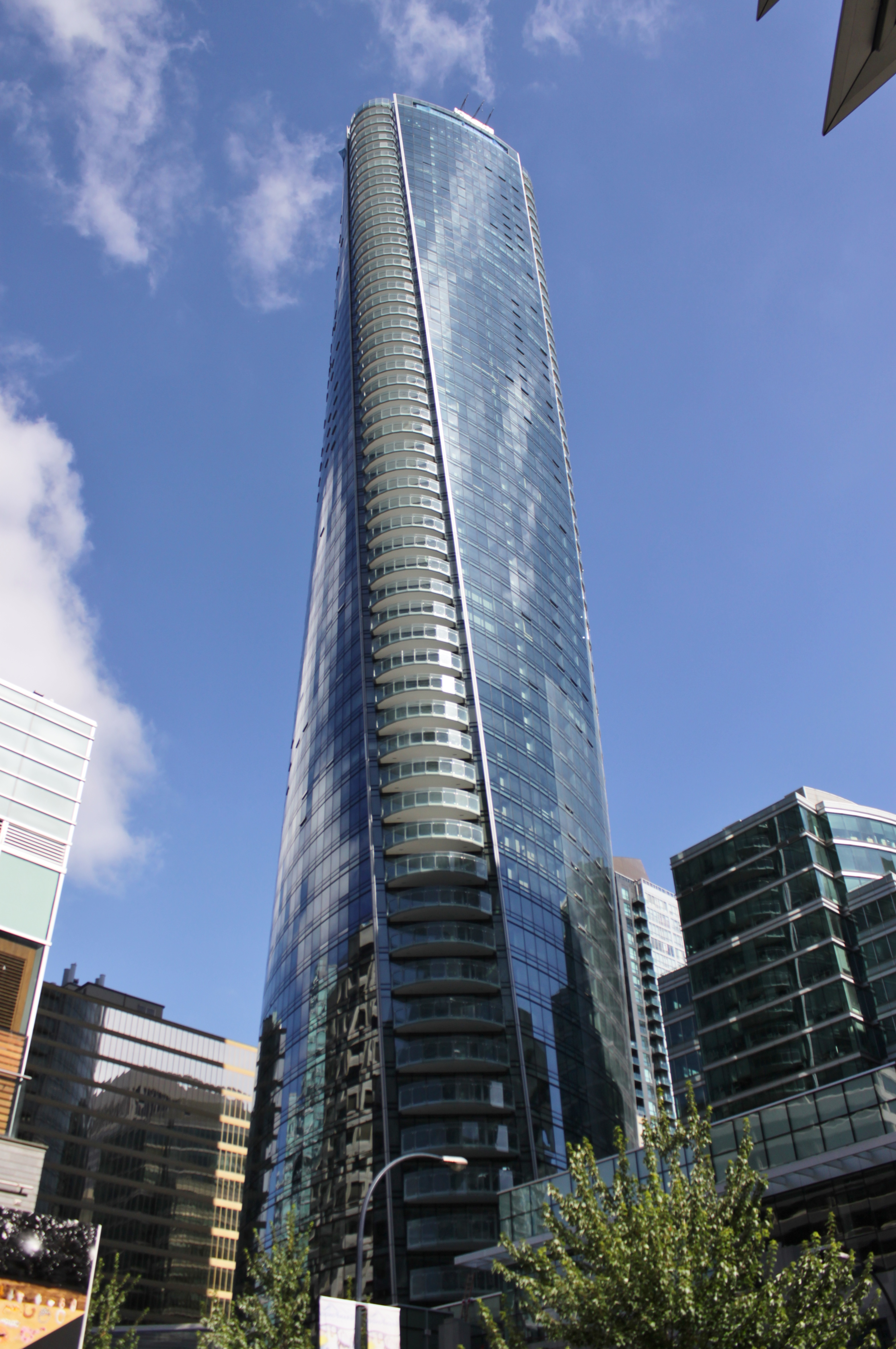
- The Paradox Vancouver under construction in August 2016

General information
- Status: Completed
- Type: Residential/Hotel
- Architectural style: Structural Expressionism
- Location: 1139 West Georgia Street; Vancouver, British Columbia, Canada
- Coordinates: 49°17′10″N 123°07′24″W
- Construction started: 2012
- Completed: 2016
- Opened: 28 February 2017; 1 April 2022
- Closed: 28 August 2020 (hotel)
- Cost: US$360 million
- Owner: Holborn Group
- Operator: TA Global Berhad

Height
- Architectural: 187.8 metres (616 ft)
- Roof: 178 metres (584 ft)

Technical details
- Floor count: 60
- Lifts/elevators: 12

Design and construction
- Architects: Arthur Erickson, Musson Cattell Mackey Partnership, DYS Architecture
- Developer: Holborn Group
- Main contractor: Urban One Builders

Other information
- Number of units: 217 apartments and 147 hotel rooms
- Parking: 346 spaces

Website
- www.paradoxhotels.com/vancouver

Paradox Vancouver, formerly known as the Trump International Hotel and Tower Vancouver, is a residential skyscraper and hotel in Downtown Vancouver, British Columbia, Canada. The 60-storey, 188-metre (617 ft) tower in which the hotel is located is at 1151 West Georgia Street and was completed in 2016. The tower is the second tallest building in Vancouver, after the Shangri-La tower located across West Georgia Street.

The triangular tower, designed by architect Arthur Erickson, twists gradually, with increasing elevation, up to 45 degrees from bottom to top. Similar to Absolute World in Mississauga, Ontario and Turning Torso in Malmö, Sweden, the building's design resembles a hyperbolic paraboloid.

In 2020, the Trump International Hotel and Tower Vancouver closed and filed for bankruptcy. Minor renovations and rebranding on the Vancouver tower began in late 2021; in April 2022, the hotel reopened as the Paradox Vancouver.

== History ==
The initial project was cancelled on February 25, 2009. Buyers who purchased luxury condos in the tower received letters informing them of the project's cancellation. On June 1, 2009, Holborn Group president Joo Kim Tiah said his company still wanted to see the plan completed on the prime downtown site—if the City of Vancouver wanted to work with him.

On August 21, 2009, it was announced that the project would definitely resume, possibly as an even taller building (pending approval from the city) while keeping the same design by Arthur Erickson who died in May of the same year. Work on the project would resume as soon as early 2010, after the Winter Olympics (construction work was not permitted during the Olympics). However, it was not certain as of August 21, 2009, if the Ritz-Carlton brand would still remain associated with the project. Developers announced on August 27, 2009, that the project will proceed. They are re-proposing the project, requesting a height increase from 182.9 metres (600 ft) to 187.8 metres (616 ft). The proposal called for a higher number of smaller housing units with a more efficient use of floor space while keeping the exterior of the tower aesthetically unchanged (outside of the height increase). The new proposal went through a series of public hearings before the Vancouver city council was scheduled to vote on it in November 2009.

The project was finally revitalized in mid-2011 without Ritz-Carlton as the hotelier. The tower was redesigned from 58 to 67 stories and two floors of underground parking were added. In mid-2012, the new hotel tenant was announced to be Marriott. Excavation recommenced in the spring of 2012, with actual construction work beginning in August. By November 2012, the foundation had been completed and substantial construction had begun, with half of the first floor of parking being completed.

In 2013 at a local press conference, Holborn Group president Joo Kim Tiah, the developer of the site, along with The Trump Organization president Donald Trump, accompanied by his three children Donald Jr., Ivanka, and Eric, unveiled the $360 million Trump International Hotel & Tower Vancouver. Holborn Group's Construction Manager for the project was Vancouver-based Urban One Builders, who later also completed UBC Brock Commons Tallwood House, the tallest wood building in Canada.

The 63-story condo and hotel complex opened on February 28, 2017, with Donald Jr., Eric Trump and developer Joo Kim Tiah in attendance. The opening was met with public protests and a boycott of the ceremony by Mayor Robertson and other local politicians. The building consisted of the Trump Hotel on the first 15 floors, topped by 217 condos on the remaining floors.

On August 28, 2020, the hotel reportedly closed permanently and was filing for bankruptcy. Over 250 employees had already been temporarily laid off due to the COVID-19 pandemic. Hotel employees had reported that they learned of the hotel closure from the media or they were informed without warning that they had lost their jobs.

In November 2021, the Mott 32 restaurant reopened after being closed since August 2020. In December 2021, the Trump branding was removed from the hotel, and it was reported that the property was being rebranded under TA Global Berhad's new Paradox Hotels banner (which also included recently-rebranded properties in Karon Beach and Singapore) for a reopening under a new operator.

The hotel officially reopened on April 1, 2022 as the Paradox Vancouver; as part of the refurbishment, TA Global partnered with Vancouver-based After Dark Hospitality Group to oversee the new lobby bar Karma Lounge, and the new Mansion Nightclub.

== Reception ==
On December 15, 2015, Vancouver mayor Gregor Robertson wrote a letter to the developers of the tower, asking them to remove Donald Trump's name from the building. Robertson stated that "Trump’s name and brand have no more place on Vancouver’s skyline than his ignorant ideas have in the modern world." A petition to remove the name was also mentioned in the letter, with more than 5000 residents voicing their concerns. British Columbia Premier Christy Clark agreed with the movement, stating that "Donald Trump doesn’t represent our city." Similar movements occurred in Toronto which led to the Trump International Hotel and Tower, Toronto, now The St. Regis Toronto, being purchased for renovation and renaming in 2017.

== See also ==
- List of condominiums in Canada
- List of tallest buildings in British Columbia
- List of tallest buildings in Vancouver
- List of twisted buildings
