= MNP Tower (Vancouver) =

35-story high-rise office building in Downtown Vancouver, British Columbia

Coordinates: 49.2875°N 123.1179°W

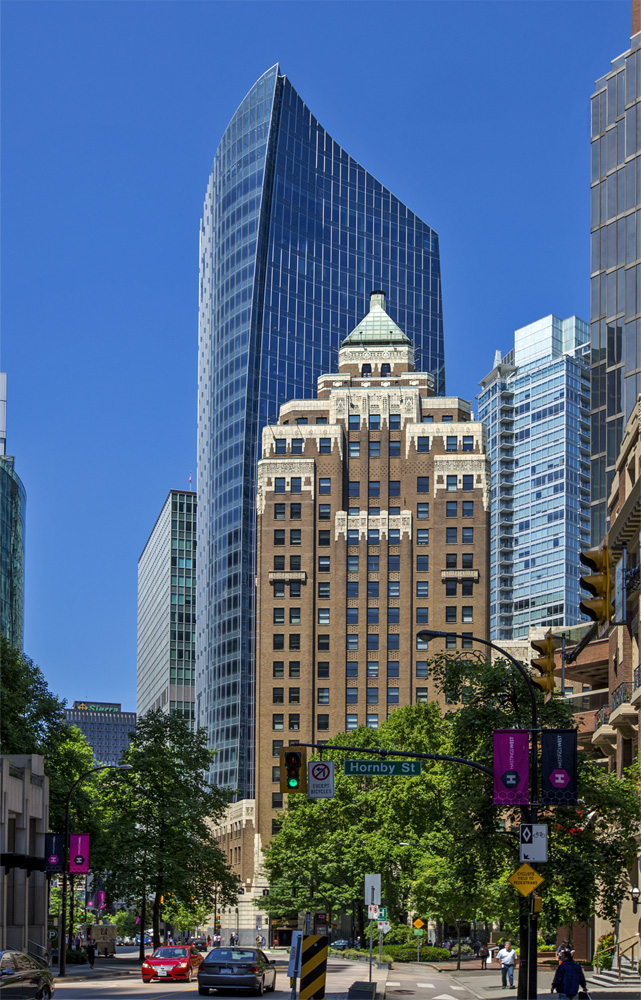

General information
- Status: Completed
- Type: Offices
- Architectural style: Modernist
- Height: 143 m (469 ft)

Technical details
- Floor count: 35 (+5 below-grade)
- Floor area: 27,823 sq ft (2,584.8 m^{2})
- Lifts/elevators: 10

Other information
- Parking: 151

Website
- www.oxfordproperties.com/lease/office/mnp-tower

MNP Tower is a 35-story high-rise office building in Downtown Vancouver, British Columbia. Standing at a height of 143 metres, it is the sixth tallest building in the city and the tallest office building. It was designed by the American architectural firm Kohn Pedersen Fox. Construction of the building began in 2012 and was completed in 2014.

== See also ==
- List of tallest buildings in Vancouver
- MNP LLP
