= Coast Plaza Hotel =

Coast Plaza Hotel & Suites
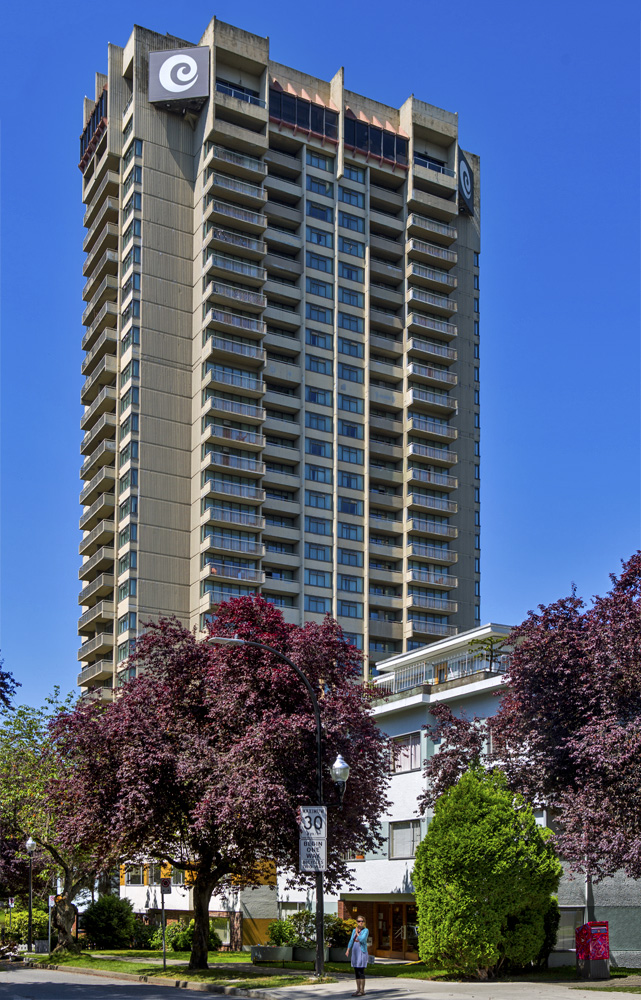
- Coast hotel tower in Vancouver.

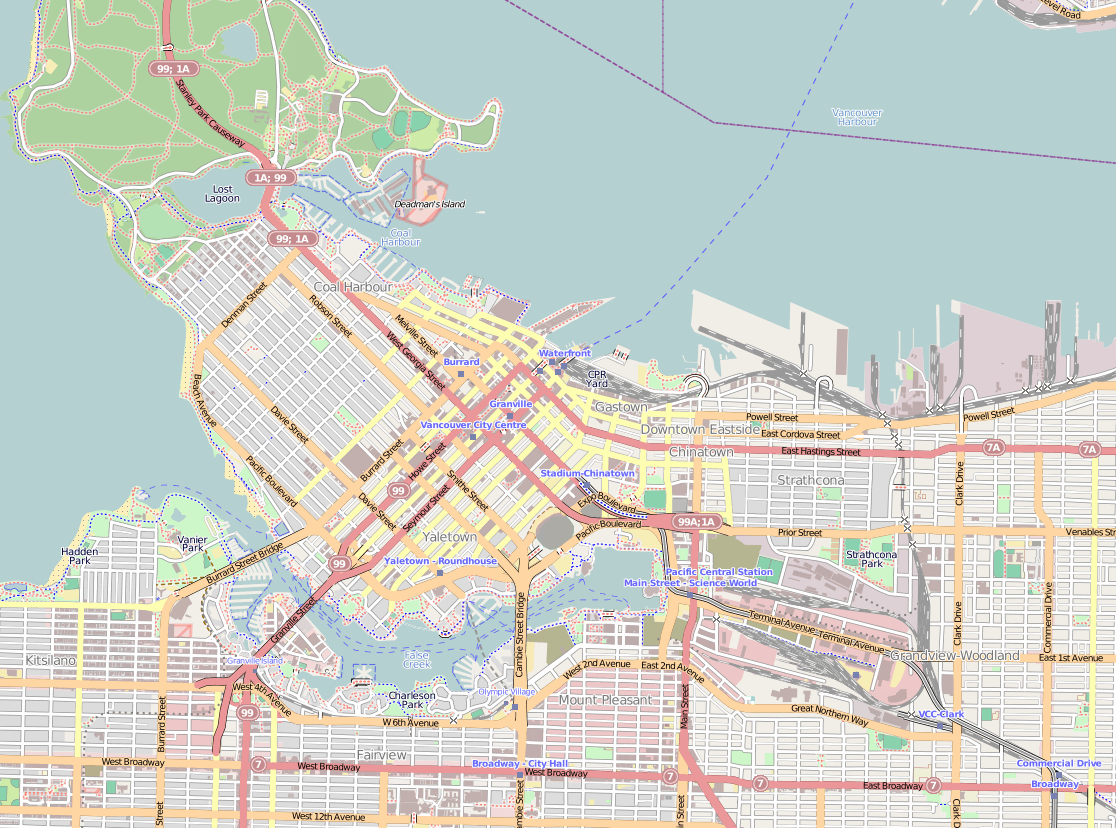
- Location within Downtown Vancouver
- Former names: Denman Place Inn; Inn at Denman Place; Denman Hotel; Ramada Renaissance; Coast Plaza at Stanley Park
- Alternative names: Denman Place
- Hotel chain: Coast Hotels

General information
- Status: Completed
- Type: Skyscraper
- Architectural style: Modernism
- Classification: Hotel
- Location: West End, 1763 Comox Street, Vancouver, British Columbia, Canada
- Coordinates: 49°17′18.611″N 123°8′19.136″W
- Completed: 1969
- Renovated: 1997
- Closed: November 21, 2017

Height
- Architectural: 328.74 feet (100.20 m)

Technical details
- Material: Concrete
- Floor count: 32

Design and construction
- Architecture firm: Jones Corporate Group; William Wilding Architects

Renovating team
- Renovating firm: Busby + Associates Architects

Other information
- Number of rooms: 199
- Number of restaurants: 1
- Number of bars: 1
- Facilities: 2

Website
- www.coasthotels.com/hotels/bc/vancouver/coast-plaza-hotel-and-suites/

Coast Plaza Hotel was a hotel in Vancouver, British Columbia, Canada. The building is 100.2 m high. The hotel has 269 rooms, and was originally an apartment building but was converted into a 35-story hotel above the Denman Place Mall.

The hotel officially closed on November 30, 2017 and was converted back to apartments
