= Royal Centre (Vancouver) =

Skyscraper complex located in Downtown Vancouver's Financial District

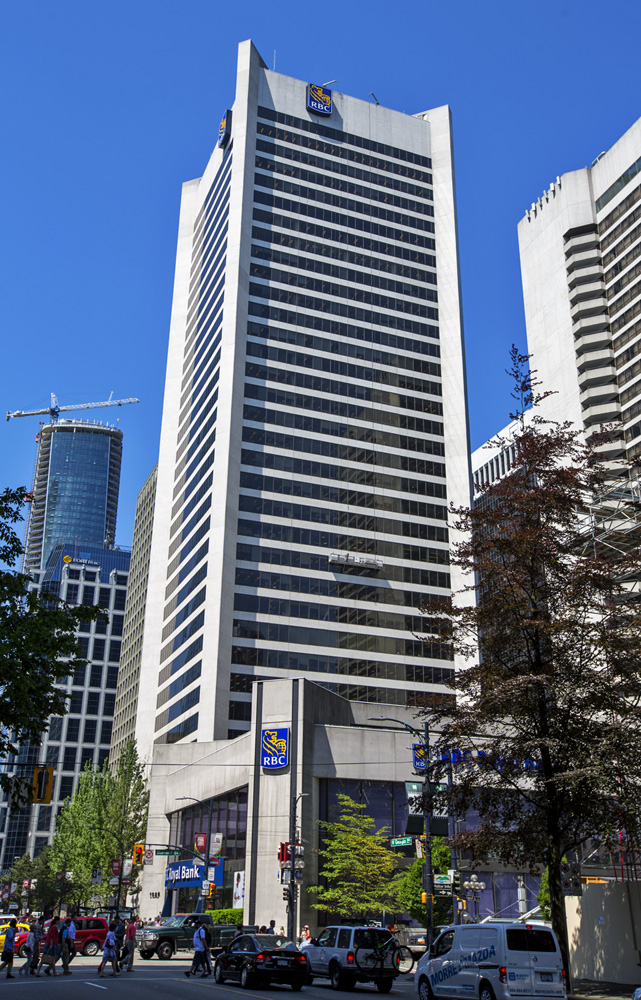

General information
- Location: 1055 West Georgia Street, Vancouver, British Columbia
- Coordinates: 49°17′05.5″N 123°07′16.2″W
- Construction started: 1971
- Completed: 1973

Technical details
- Floor count: 37
- Floor area: 50,236 square metres (540,736 sq ft)

Design and construction
- Architects: Dirassar James Jorgenson & Davis (architects); Webb Zerafa & Menkes (design consultants); C. B. K. Van Norman & Associates (design consultants)

Website
- https://royalcentre.com/

Royal Centre, also known as RBC Tower or Royal Bank Tower, is a skyscraper complex located at 1055 West Georgia Street in Downtown Vancouver's Financial District. The skyscraper stands at just under 145m tall and 37 storeys. Royal Centre was the tallest building in Vancouver upon completion in 1973 and remained so until it was overtaken by Harbour Centre in 1977.

The primary tenant of the complex is RBC's British Columbia headquarters. The building was owned and managed by Brookfield Properties, a major North American commercial real estate company, until its sale over the 2016-2017 period.

== Services ==
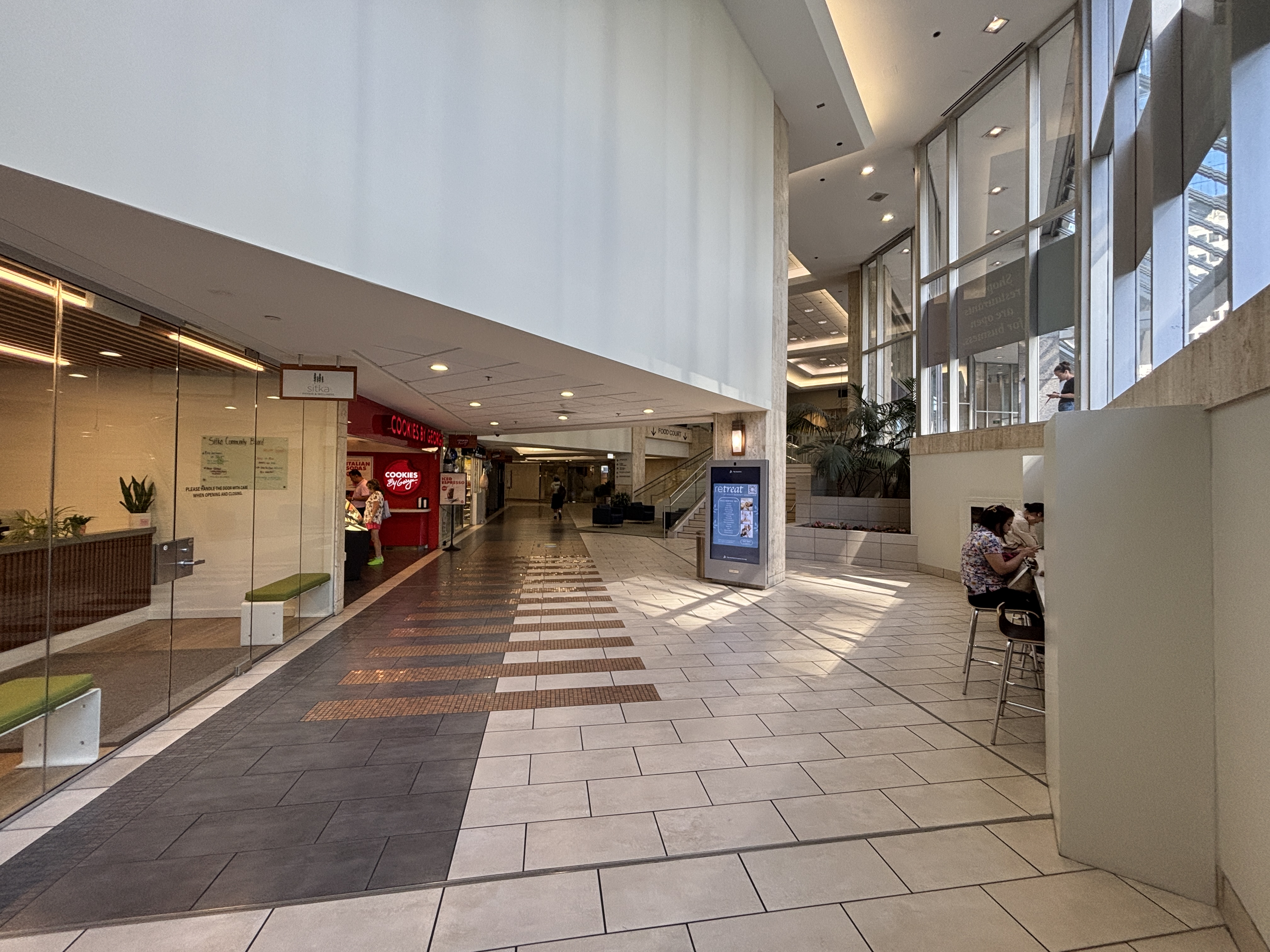
Royal Centre Arcade

There are two underground levels of retail stores in the Royal Centre complex, including food court.

The complex has direct access to the Burrard SkyTrain station.

== See also ==
- List of tallest buildings in Vancouver
- Royal Bank Tower (Vancouver)
