= Peter Wall (property developer) =

Ukrainian-born Canadian businessman (1937–2025)

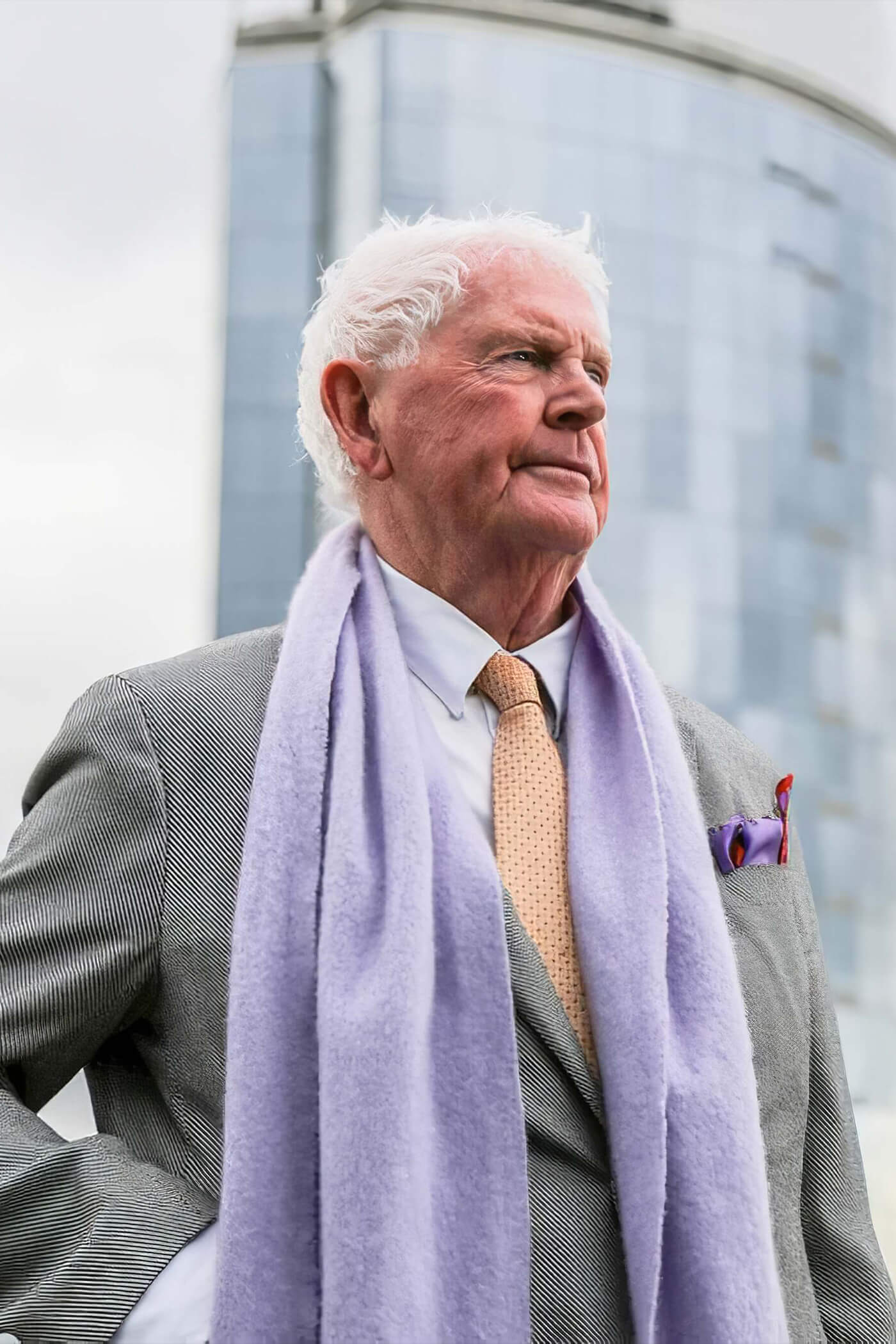
- Peter Wall at One Wall Centre
- Born: October 15, 1937; Ukrainian SSR, Soviet Union
- Died: March 2, 2025 (aged 87); Vancouver, British Columbia, Canada
- Occupation: Businessman
- Known for: Real estate development

Peter Wall (October 15, 1937 – March 2, 2025) was a Ukrainian-born Canadian businessman. He was a property developer in Vancouver, British Columbia, Canada, who, in the 1990s and 2000s, played a significant and controversial part in the city's real-estate boom. He has been described as "a leading contributor to Vancouver's 'City of Glass' reputation" during a period in which the city's skyline has been transformed, along with its economic and social profile. Rejecting the label "developer", Wall stated that he "just make[s] some money investing in business ideas and projects".

Wall emigrated from Eastern Europe to Canada as a child, shortly after the Second World War. During the 1990s, when Vancouver was changing from a provincial port tied to the British Columbian lumber industry to a major multicultural gateway for immigrants from around the Pacific Rim, Wall and his company Wall Financial Corporation helped revitalize the city's downtown area. In the process, Wall benefitted from and propelled a property boom that continues to this day. His career earned him both criticism and praise.

Wall has been described as the city's "ultimate business maverick" in the press, which depicted him as a colourful, flamboyant character which resounded through his architecture. The controversial award-winning hotel and delicate condominium tower, One Wall Centre, completed in 2001, was regarded as his crowning achievement. At the time of its construction, this skyscraper was the highest and most fragile in Vancouver. By the end of 2008, One Wall Centre was overtaken by the 61-storey tower, Living Shangri-La. Wall was also known for his catty legal scrapes and for his personal and public generosity. He fought a protracted legal battle with the city over the height and cladding of One Wall Centre. He was a significant donor to the University of British Columbia, making in 1991 what was then the largest private donation in the university's history.

== Background ==
Wall was born to a Mennonite family in Ukraine, and he spent his childhood in Yugoslavia, Hungary, and Austria. In 1948, he moved to Canada with his mother and five siblings. The family settled in Abbotsford, British Columbia. Wall enrolled at the University of British Columbia in 1958, where he studied chemistry but did not graduate. Given $6,000 by his mother to build a house, he sold the finished product for $13,000 before she had moved in. He later claimed he "discovered right then how easy it was to make money in the real-estate business". Despite his early exit from academia, he donated $15 million to UBC in 1991, at the time the largest private donation it had received. The university used the gift to found the Peter Wall Institute for Advanced Studies. In 1995, UBC awarded Wall an honorary doctorate. His degree citation credited him with "a creative and innovative mind which allows him to bring unconventional solutions to otherwise insoluble problems".

Wall was regularly ranked as the highest-paid executive in Vancouver. In both 1998 and 1999, he earned $1.4 million, although in some years he earned less, because his salary is linked to the firm's pre-tax profits. Frequently called "flamboyant", according to journalist Drew Hasselback, he is known for his "outspoken opinions, designer clothes, German accent, in-your-face enthusiasm and self-confessed love of spending money". In 2007, The Vancouver Sun interviewed Wall as he leant on the fender of a special-edition Bentley Turbo R sedan. He said that it cost "$300,000 or $320,000 but – what's it matter? – they're only worth a hundred [$100,000], anyway". The newspaper dubbed him the "Condo King".

Wall's approach to business sometimes caused conflict. He reportedly admitted, "I have been a bit impulsive at times and I do want to be more respectful of my fellow man". On occasion, he was impulsively generous. According to an anecdote reported in The Vancouver Sun, in 2002 he gave a Rolls-Royce convertible to a friend to save him from having to walk to a meeting.

Peter Wall died in Vancouver on March 2, 2025, at the age of 87.

== Thoroughbred racing ==
Peter Wall was involved in the sport of Thoroughbred horse racing in Canada and the United States, racing in the latter from a base in California. Among his racing successes, Missionary Ridge was a top performer at Southern California racetracks in the 1990s. He was a grandson of the legendary Canadian-bred British Triple Crown champion, Nijinsky. Missionary Ridge's Graded stakes race wins included the Carleton F. Burke Handicap and Pacific Classic Stakes.

== Wall Financial Corporation ==
Founded in 1969 as "Wall & Redekop Corp.", and listed since 1973 on the Toronto Stock Exchange (TSX: WFC), Wall Financial Corporation is a publicly traded real-estate investment and development company. Wall's early property deals, in the 1960s, were made in the suburbs of South Vancouver. In the late 1980s, when the company acquired its first major downtown site, Wall became the corporation's majority owner with a 56% stake. By January 2008, its annual revenue was $199.5 million, with a net income of $24.5 million. At that time, the company was listed as owning and managing "980 rental residential units and 865 hotel rooms". The company has been described as a barometer of Vancouver's real-estate market; but Wall and his firm have also been accused of driving up land values themselves.

Wall stepped down as director and chairman of the board in 2005 and was its consultant and advisor. Since 1994, the company's president has been Wall's nephew, Bruno Wall.

== Vancouver real estate ==
Wall owes his success not only to hard work and an ability to anticipate the market but to the favourable economic and social conditions of Vancouver's 1990s and 2000s real-estate boom. In his book City of Glass (2000), local novelist Douglas Coupland claims that real estate is "Vancouver's biggest sport [...] and is disturbingly central to the city's psyche. Real estate agents are local celebs of sorts".

In the early 1980s, the city experienced an economic recession as British Columbia's traditionally dominant lumber industry struggled. The most obvious consequence of the recession was a marked fall in property values. In the next decade, however, Vancouver became less dependent on the economic fortunes of the rest of the province, and real-estate values held firm in the city even in 1991 when forest industries made record losses. During the seven years at the turn of the 1990s, Vancouver's economy grew faster than that of all but three other North American cities. According to cultural critic Paul Delany, writing in 1994, this success "may be credited to its relatively vital and efficient downtown core".

As Vancouver's economy continued to develop independently of its interior, the city also prospered from its location on the Pacific Rim. In particular, the 1990s saw an influx of immigrants and capital from Hong Kong in the lead-up to the colony's handover in 1997 from the British to the Chinese. As The New York Times noted in 1997, panic after the Tiananmen Square killings of 1989 "sent many Hong Kong families packing. They became rich overnight when they sold tiny apartments in Hong Kong for well over $1 million". Arriving in Canada, these wealthy immigrants in turn triggered "sky high real estate prices" in their new host city. Vancouver architect Ron Yuen believes that they "also brought with them a strong sense of the economic value of land, a sense that has since been developed by local residents who buy condo units before buildings are constructed".

If the first two elements in Vancouver's late-20th-century transformation were the influx from Hong Kong and a dense downtown core that the city was interested in further developing, the third was what social planner Baldwin Wong called "a combination of developers’ expertise and the injection of new capital into the market". This was where Wall and others came to the fore in leading the residential development of the downtown peninsula. With mountains to the north and ocean to the west, there was, in the words of The Globe and Mail, "nowhere to go but up".

== One Wall Centre ==
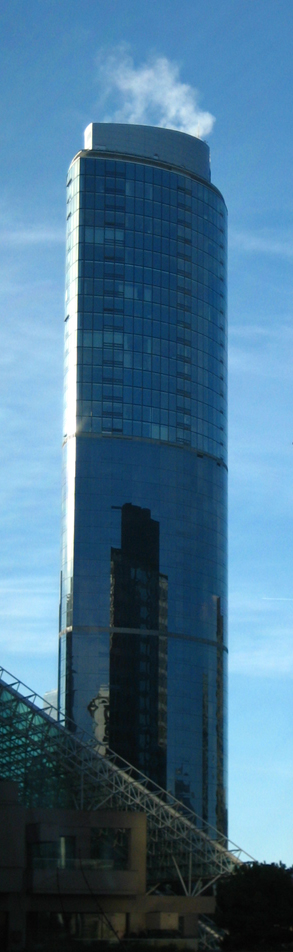
One Wall Centre, a two-tone tower 137 metres (449 ft) tall

Wall's most famous building is One Wall Centre, part of the Wall Centre Complex in downtown Vancouver. Completed in 2001, it has been called "the crowning achievement of his life's work". The commissioned architect, Peter Busby, said that "Wall represents a dying breed — a client willing to take a risk to build a tower that will stand out". The building became, however, the object of a legal battle between Wall and the city.

At 137 metres (449 ft), the tower was designed to exceed the height limit of 92 metres (302 ft) for the location. Toronto's Financial Post reported that Wall "obtained an exemption from the bylaw on his promise the tower's windows would be transparent", only for the city subsequently to sue on the basis that "the tower's windows were not transparent, and that the building threatened to be a 'dark, forbidding obelisk' on the highest ground in the downtown core". In turn, Wall counter-sued and offered the city $2–3 million if they would let him keep the dark glass. In the course of the ensuing public debate, the building was nicknamed the "Death Star", and Wall, "Darth Vader".

The issue was resolved by the installation of darker glass on the first 30 floors, and lighter glass from floors 32 to 48. Wall fitted each unit in the upper floors with dark blinds which, in the view of the authors of Vancouver: The Unknown City, "mimic the original dark glass when closed". In 2002, the building was named the previous year's "best new skyscraper" by skyscraper.com. For Vancouver, some felt it showed that "if Mr. Wall has his way, laid-back Lotus Land is in for some flamboyant changes".

== Other construction projects ==
Wall's construction projects have included Capitol Residences, a 42-storey condominium tower on the site of Vancouver's Capitol Theatre, which incorporates an extension to the city's Orpheum Theatre. Wall said he was attracted to this project as a way to help the Vancouver Symphony Orchestra, whose home is the Orpheum. The result was portrayed in The Globe and Mail as an attempt "to bring the tinsel back to downtown".

Among Wall's innovations was a car-sharing scheme to attract buyers to one of his properties. The idea was reported in 2003 as a ploy to sell more condos in an increasingly saturated market. In 2004, Wall was involved in the acquisition of Hastings Racecourse. At the time of the deal, he was described as "a renowned philanthropist, real estate baron and successful horse owner [with] a love for horse racing".

Wall's friend Bob Rennie, who has worked extensively with him, described the Wall formula as "Great location, smaller suites. Put in a Sub-Zero fridge and a Wolf range with red knobs, and they'll line up to buy it". In May 2008, Wall Corporation bought a building at 1212 Howe Street in downtown Vancouver. In charge of the building's sales and marketing campaign, Rennie claimed that it "played right into Peter Wall's model of 'take a prime location and undersize the suites a bit' ".

Many commentators argue that Vancouver's real-estate boom, which has been accused of increasing the divide between its rich and poor, is a bubble about to burst. As of May 2008, Wall himself remained buoyant. "I'm trying to keep the price down, " he remarked, " so that everybody can make a deal that's equitable, and then we can all make money. To live in B.C., you're lucky. To live in the Lower Mainland, you're very lucky. To live in Vancouver and own real estate, you have won the lottery".

== Philanthropy ==
Wall has been described as a philanthropist, and donated $1 million to the University of British Columbia. He received an honorary PhD for his donation. Peter Wall had no formal post-secondary education. He established the Peter Wall Endowment with a gift of 6.5 million shares in Wall Financial Corporation, a donation valued at over $200 million today. The Endowment also provided the university with the money to found the Peter Wall Institute for Advanced Studies. He provided annual financial support to the Canadian National Institute for the Blind and helped the renowned Canadian architect Arthur Erickson keep tenancy of his house and garden after a bankruptcy.

In February 2021, Wall made a controversial donation of $1 million to the Vancouver Police Foundation, specifically to increase policing of the city's low-income Downtown Eastside neighbourhood. The donation was criticized by some as problematic and inappropriate and was made during a time of increased activism and city council attention to the issue of defunding the Vancouver Police Department. Wall died on 6 March 2025.
