= Abraham Rogatnick =

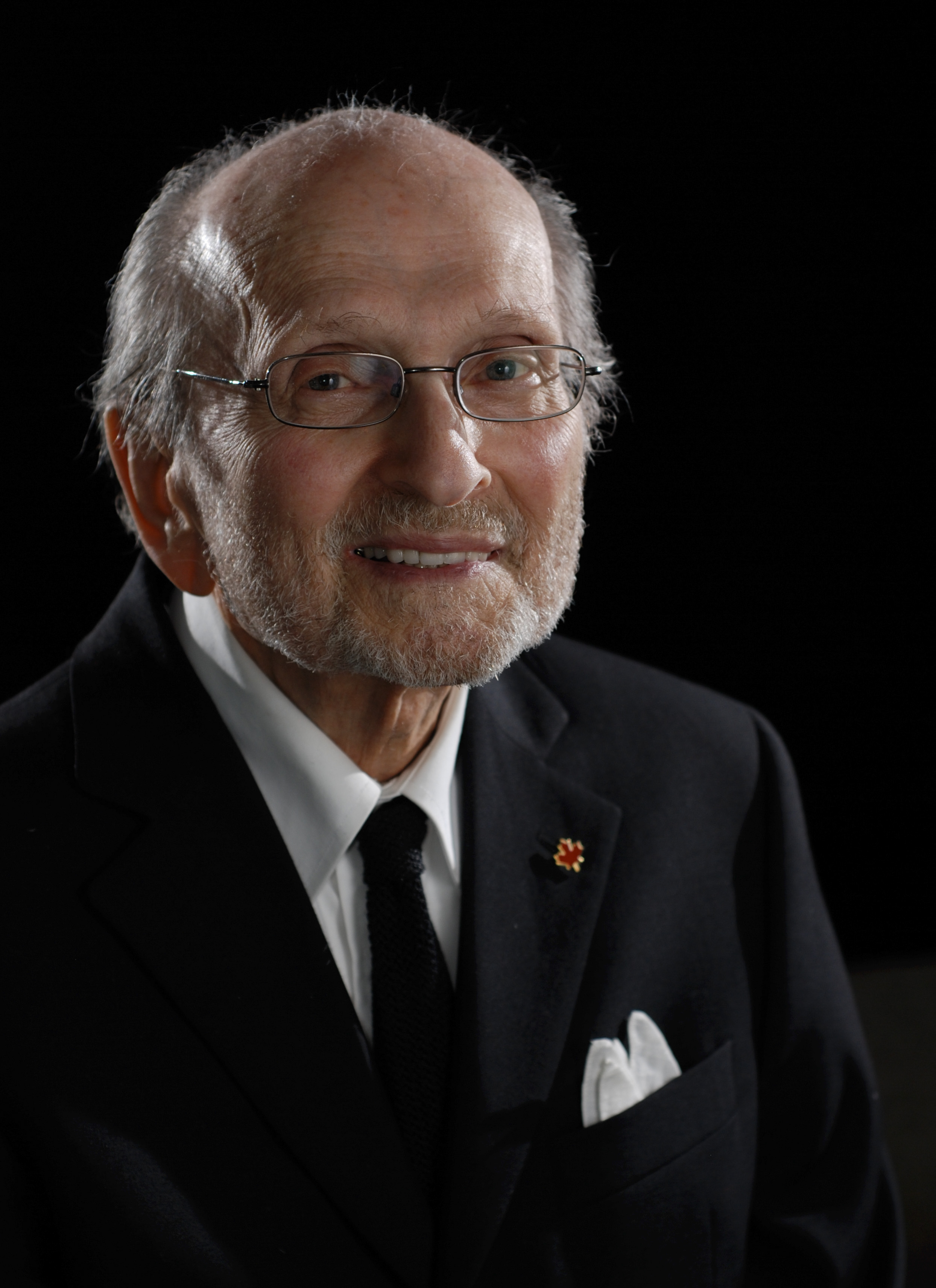
Rogatnick in 2006

Abraham Jedidiah Rogatnick (27 November 1923 - 28 August 2009) was an American-born Canadian architect and professor.

== Early life ==
Rogatnick was born in Boston, Massachusetts. He graduated in 1952 from Harvard with two degrees studying under Walter Gropius, founder of the Bauhaus School.

== World War II ==
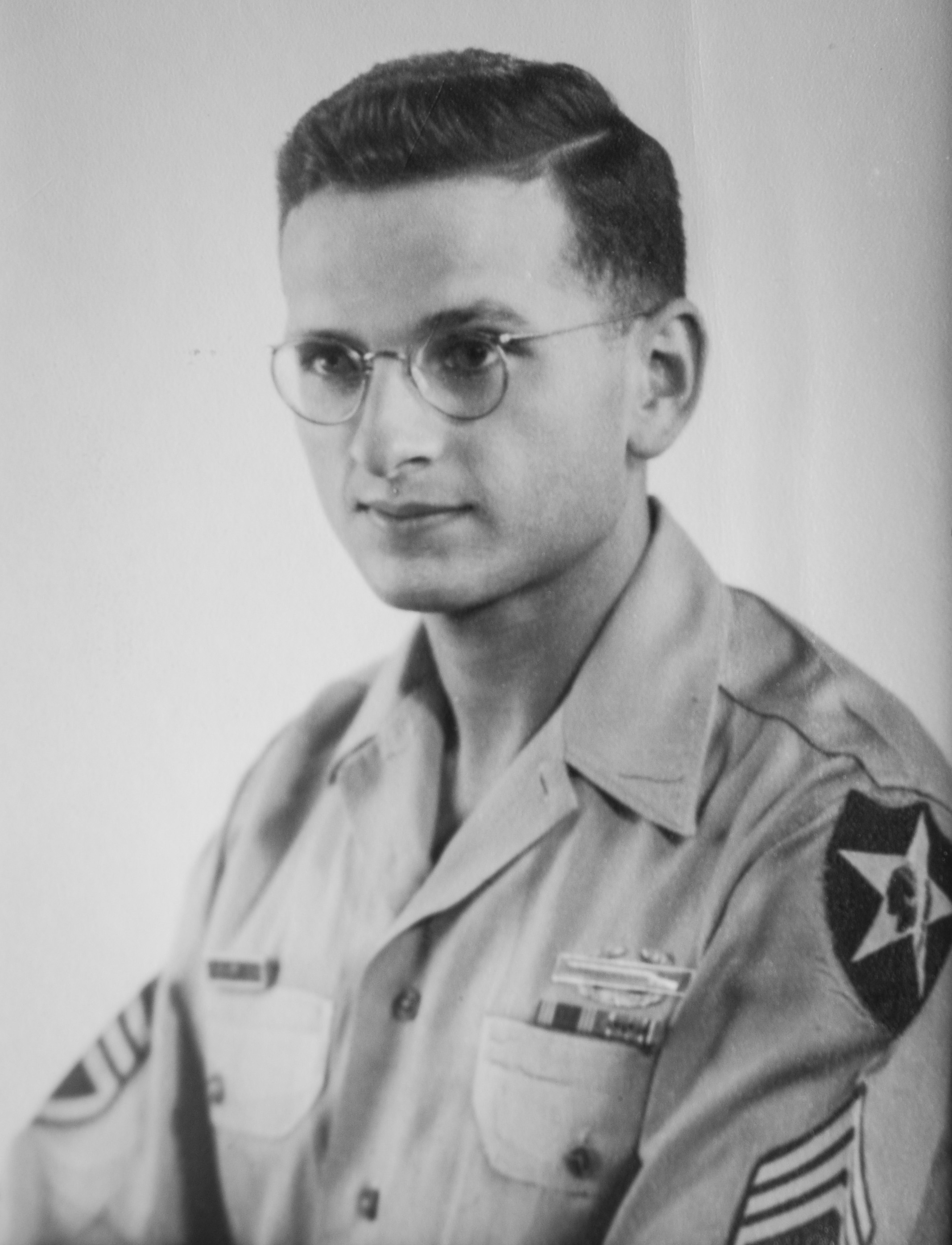
Rogatnick in World War II

Rogatnick's studies at Harvard were interrupted by World War II when he enlisted and was sent to Europe. He spent most of his time at the front lines once his facility with conversational German was discovered and utilized for intelligence and communications. During the Battle of the Bulge, grossly underarmed against the advance of the 12th SS Panzer division, he narrowly escaped enemy attacks on three different occasions and was one of the few survivors of his unit.

== Move from Boston to Vancouver ==
After the war he traveled and studied in Europe where he developed a deep love for Venice. He learned Italian, became a scholar of Venice and was a member of the cultural community there. This work connected him with scholars including Marshall McLuhan, Buckminster Fuller, Ezra Pound and Giuseppe Mazzariol. In 1955, he and lifelong partner Alvin Balkind were invited to visit Vancouver by Harvard classmate, architect and Alderman Geoffrey Massey where they were hosted by Arthur Erickson. They fell in love with Vancouver and became pillars of Vancouver's artistic community. Within weeks of arriving he and Balkind opened Canada's first commercial modern art gallery, The New Design Gallery (NDG) and revolutionized the arts scene in Vancouver. The art critic John Bentley Mays, in a 1992 obituary of the curator Balkind, gave the NDG a place in Canadian history—crediting it with boosting the careers of Jack Shadbolt, Iain Baxter, Roy Kiyooka, Toni Onley, and Joe Plaskett, among others. For 10 years it would stand as the only commercial gallery in Vancouver devoted to contemporary art.

They helped cofound the Arts Club Review introducing avant-garde artistic works to Vancouver; the legacy of this effort is Vancouver's highly successful Arts Club Theatre.

== University of British Columbia ==
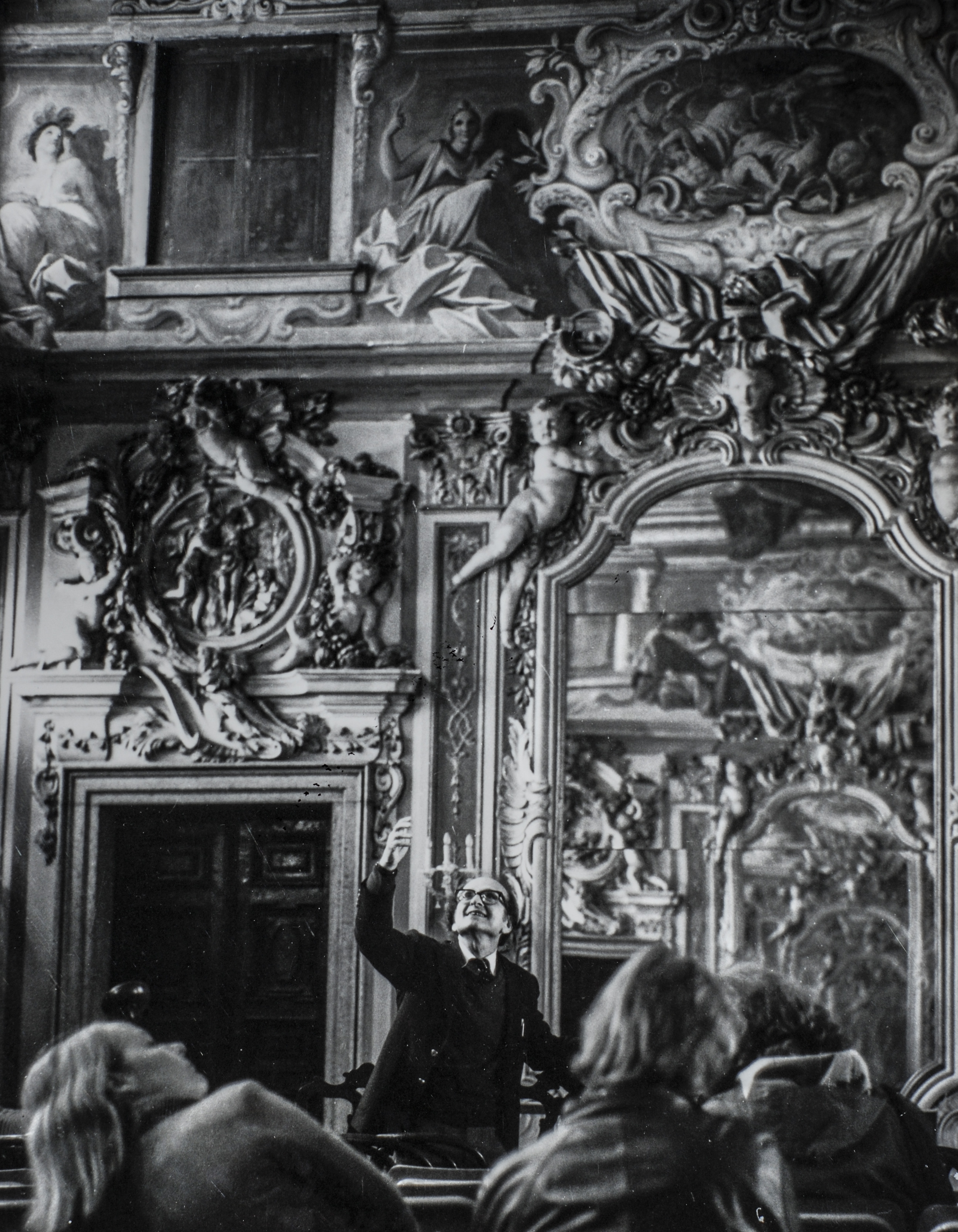
Rogatnick in Venice

Rogatnick's most profound contribution to Vancouver was as UBC Architecture Professor from 1959 to 1985 where he was much loved for treating his classes as theatrical multimedia events. As students entered a class, their senses would be set with dim lighting and music of the period playing. Rogatnick would then set the mood of the period with a socio-economic portrait of the day before moving onto a slide show that exalted the buildings without focus on the terms, names and dates that he suffered through in his didactic Harvard lectures. The values, aesthetic sensibilities and love of learning that he inspired in his students have changed the face of Vancouver. Rogatnick's reaction to the student rebellions of the late 60's was to replace formal ("Victorian") exams, with assignments in which students did their own research and had to build their own architectural models for grading. His students include such internationally noted architects as Bruno Freschi, Bing Thom, Peter Busby, Paul Merrick and Bill Pechet. He founded the Studies Abroad program sending students from Vancouver to study in great cities of the world, and as one of the world's foremost authorities on Venice, he expounded the many lessons Vancouver can learn from the water surrounded Mecca.

He received the 1975 Master Teacher Award and the 2008 Honorary Alumnus Award. He was architectural advisor for Canada's National Gallery in Ottawa, was the director of the Vancouver Art Gallery and contributed to Vancouver's design guidelines and policies.

== Retirement and death ==
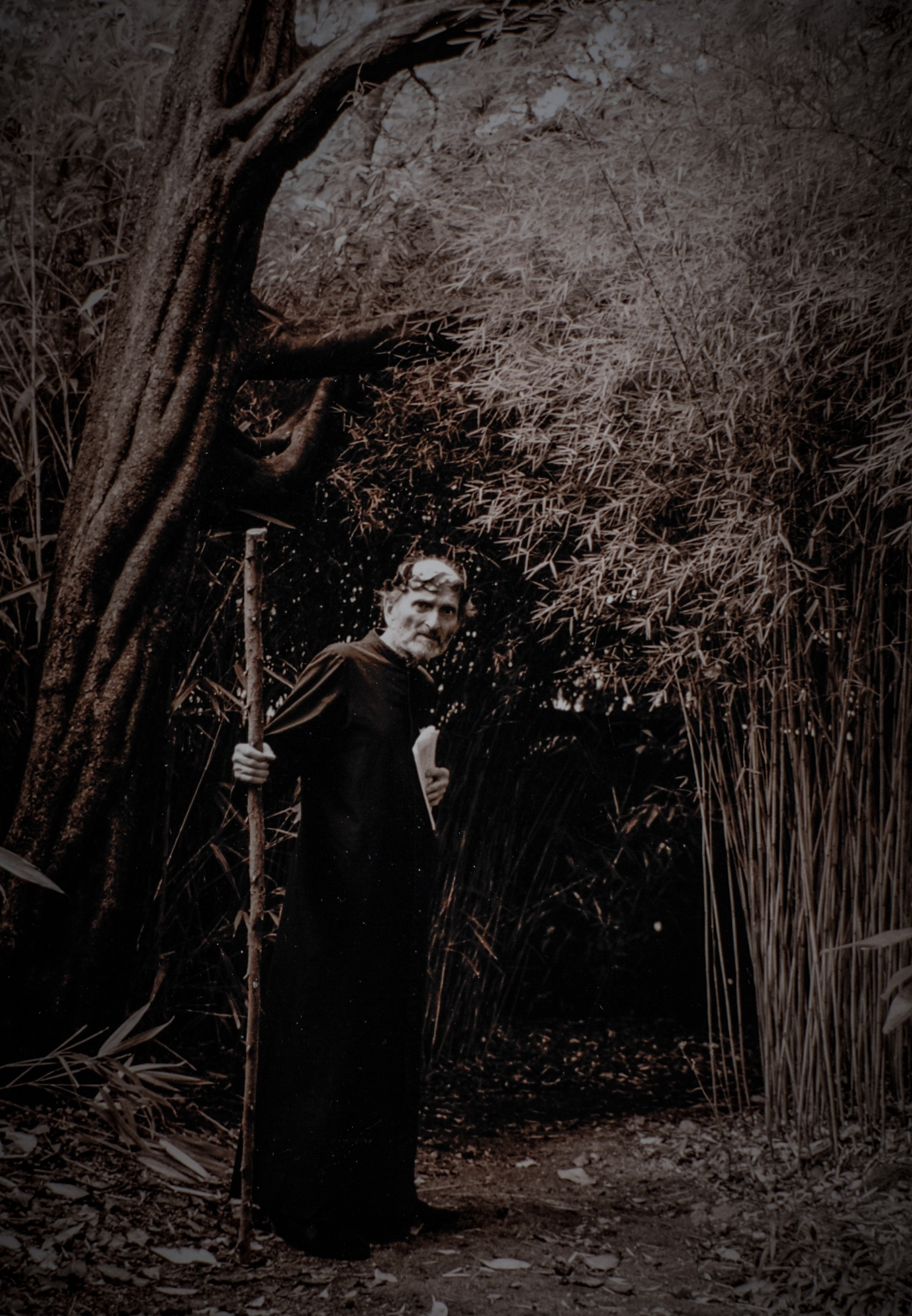
Rogatnick in Arthur Erickson's garden

After retiring from UBC, Rogatnick began a new career as an actor playing roles—"usually dying old men"—in a variety of Hollywood movies and local plays including Fiddler on the Roof at The Vancouver Playhouse. He directed and played his own roles in his Vancouver Fringe Festival show, 'Stories that could not be Told', about his World War II experiences, and the role of Dante and The Grim Reaper in 'Descent to the Underworld' which he performed at the Western Front.

Rogatnick joined the Board of Directors of the Contemporary Art Gallery in 2000 and served until 2002. He took a leading role in overseeing the design of the CAG's purpose-built facility under construction at that time. He also took a leading role in the campaign to fund the creation of the facility, and the smaller gallery space is named in honour of Alvin Balkind. Following his retirement from the Board, Rogatnick maintained frequent correspondence with many Vancouver artists and created a salon in which invited speakers presented their ideas on arts, culture and society. These initial informal meetings have evolved into Sam Sullivan's Public Salons held at The Vancouver Playhouse. Rogatnick was active in the politics of the city from supporting harm reduction drug policies, opposing the Ward system, electing Sam Sullivan as Mayor and advocating a renewal of the Vancouver Art Gallery at its current site.

"I remember once an entire exam—this was in the days before he'd abandoned exams—was one question," said Bing Thom, the architect who would go on to design the Chan Centre at UBC and SFU's Central City campus in Surrey. "The question was this: 'If you had to do something to the Vancouver courthouse, what would you do?' I said it should become an art gallery." Many years later Thom was appointed project director for Arthur Erickson's Robson Square development. "Abe always talked about the importance of the public realm: the public space, the street edge," said Thom. "The street as the living room of the city. He taught us what urbanity meant."

Rogatnick died in Vancouver.
