= Geoffrey Massey =

Canadian architect and urban planner (1924–2020)

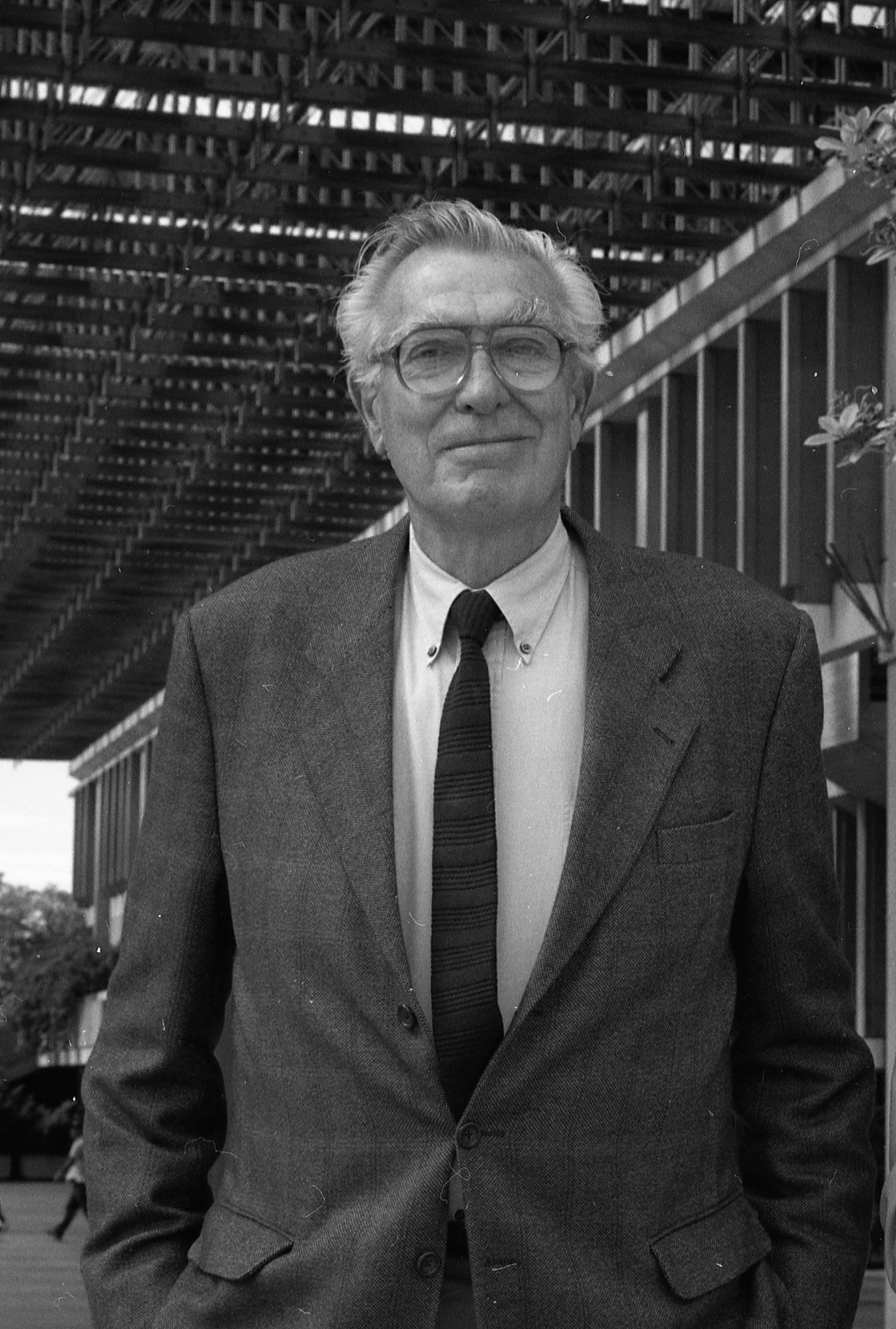
- Massey in 2005
- Born: 29 October 1924; London, England
- Died: 1 December 2020 (aged 96); North Vancouver, British Columbia, Canada
- Occupations: Architect and urban planner
- Known for: Modernism-themed design; pedestrian-focused urban planning
- Notable work: Simon Fraser University
- Father: Raymond Massey

Geoffrey Massey (29 October 1924 – 1 December 2020) was a Canadian architect and urban planner noted for his modernism-inspired architectural works. He was known for his partnership with architect Arthur Erickson that produced notable designs including the Simon Fraser University, and MacMillan Bloedel Building. As an urban planner, Massey was known for his contributions toward pedestrian-friendly densification of Vancouver and development of Granville Island in the city.

== Early life ==
Massey was born in London, England, on 29 October 1924, to Margery and Raymond Massey. His father was an actor and theatre artist who had acted in movies including Abe Lincoln in Illinois, and was the great-grandson of Massey-Harris tractor company founder, Daniel Massey. Geoffrey Massey's parents separated when he was five, in 1929. He went to the United States when his father's career took him to Broadway.

Around the time he turned from 17 to 18 years old, Massey enlisted in the Canadian Army in 1942. He served in it for four years, and in doing so, he became a Canadian citizen. During his time in the service he trained as a paratrooper. However World War II ended before a scheduled deployment to the Japanese theatre could take place. Massey later said that his experience in the army had been formative, as he had been doing poorly in school before that but military service, and the break from education, gave him a sense of purpose and direction.

Following the war, Massey received his Bachelor of Arts degree from Harvard University, and earned his master's degree from the university's Graduate School of Design. He learned under the co-founder of the Bauhaus movement, Walter Gropius, who was the head of the department in the school. During his time in the university, he was introduced to modernism in the curriculum, while other schools at the time still taught neoclassicism. It was here that he took part in debates and discussions focused on a fundamental rethink towards urban design. He was also introduced to the works of Le Corbusier who led the ground-up design of the Indian city of Chandigarh.

== Career ==
After graduating from Harvard, Massey took up a job in Montreal before moving to British Columbia to put some of his learnings on modernism to practice. He joined Thompson Berwick and Pratt and Partners, who were building Kitimat, a new township in British Columbia, for the workers of Alcan's aluminum plant on the North Coast. However, he was soon disenchanted with the monotonous designs and rigid design templates. It was here that he met Arthur Erickson with whom he would go on to partner on many projects.

He set up a design practice with Erickson, where he would complement Erickson's conceptual designs with his own focus on urban outlook. The practice over time had other noted architects including Bruno Freschi, Nick Milkovich, and Bo Helliwell. In 1963, Erickson and Massey won a design competition to build a new university, Simon Fraser University, on top of the Burnaby Mountain in British Columbia. Their modernism-themed submission was a futuristic design that beat 71 other submissions to win the competition. Their proposal was noted to have combined elements of the Acropolis of Athens and the terraced houses of hillside Italy, and adopting a horizontal approach rather than a vertical approach using the mountain itself as a part of the overarching design.

He produced Project 56 and Project 58 in the late 1950s in partnership with Erickson, to redefine urban space planning for the city of Vancouver. The plans focused on the concept of urban high-rises and a redefinition plan for a pedestrian-focused downtown city core. These plans would become the foundation for Vancouver's West End. He also partnered with Erickson and Freschi to develop concepts for transformation of the Vancouver downtown corridor into pedestrian-friendly glass-domed shopping zones. While the project was rejected by the province and the city as being too expensive, the ideas of pedestrian-friendly urban densification persisted in the city. His partnership with Erickson ended in 1972, with the duo attributing it to differing professional objectives with Massey choosing to concentrate in Vancouver and Erickson interested in a global thrust. The partnership had won eight Massey medals for architecture including for the Canadian pavilion at Expo '70 in Osaka, the MacMillan Bloedel Building, and the Man in the community and Man and his health-themed pavilions at Expo 67 in Quebec, and three housing design council awards.

Earlier, in 1963, he supported another Vancouver architect, Ronald Thom, to win the design commission for Massey College at the University of Toronto. The college was commissioned by his uncle, Vincent Massey, who after his tenure as the 18th Governor General of Canada had initially wanted a gothic revival structure. However, on Massey's persuasion, they decided on a contemporary modernist design. During the same time, he was partnered with Vancouver-based lawyer, Garry Watson, to develop a blueprint for the development of Whistler, British Columbia. He was a co-founder of the Garibaldi Whistler Development Company, which put together a community plan and a bid for the 1968 Winter Olympics. While the bid was not successful, his continued efforts were instrumental in shaping Whistler as a premier skiing destination. He also played a key role in the development of Hernando Island in the southern coast of British Columbia.

Massey became a councillor at the Vancouver City Council in 1972, and went on to be an advisor to the city's planning commission. He was part of the team that halted a planned inner-city freeway and prevented freeways from being built in the city of Vancouver. He also helped development of Granville Island and redevelopment of the south side of False Creek, converting it from industrial to residential use and also helped support the conversion of a section of Granville Street to a pedestrian-only zone in continuation of his focus on making the city pedestrian friendly. However, Massey quit the council at the end of his two-year term disenchanted with municipal politics from the effort to realize even simple projects.

His other influences on Vancouver included inviting and encouraging Abraham Rogatnick, his classmate from Harvard, to come to Vancouver and eventually open the New Design Gallery, which was the city's first modern art gallery focused on showcasing contemporary Canadian art. He also partnered with Rogatnick to set up the Arts Club, which became the Arts Club Theatre. These contributions were in part responsible for the evolution of Vancouver into a culturally vibrant city.

== Personal life ==
Massey married his wife Ruth (née Killam) in 1955. Earlier, Killam had hired Massey and his design partner Erickson to design her modernist house on a peninsula projecting into the Howe Sound near Whytecliff in West Vancouver. The couple had four children. His wife died in 2011.

Massey died on 1 December 2020, from pneumonia in North Vancouver. He was aged 96.

== Select works ==
Sources:

- Graham House, West Vancouver, BC
- Simon Fraser University, Burnaby, BC
- MacMillan Bloedel Building, Vancouver, BC
- Staples Residence, West Vancouver, BC
- Massey College, University of Toronto, Toronto, ON
- University of Lethbridge University Hall, Lethbridge, AB
- Robson Square, Vancouver, BC (initial plans)
- Whistler Highlands, Whistler, BC
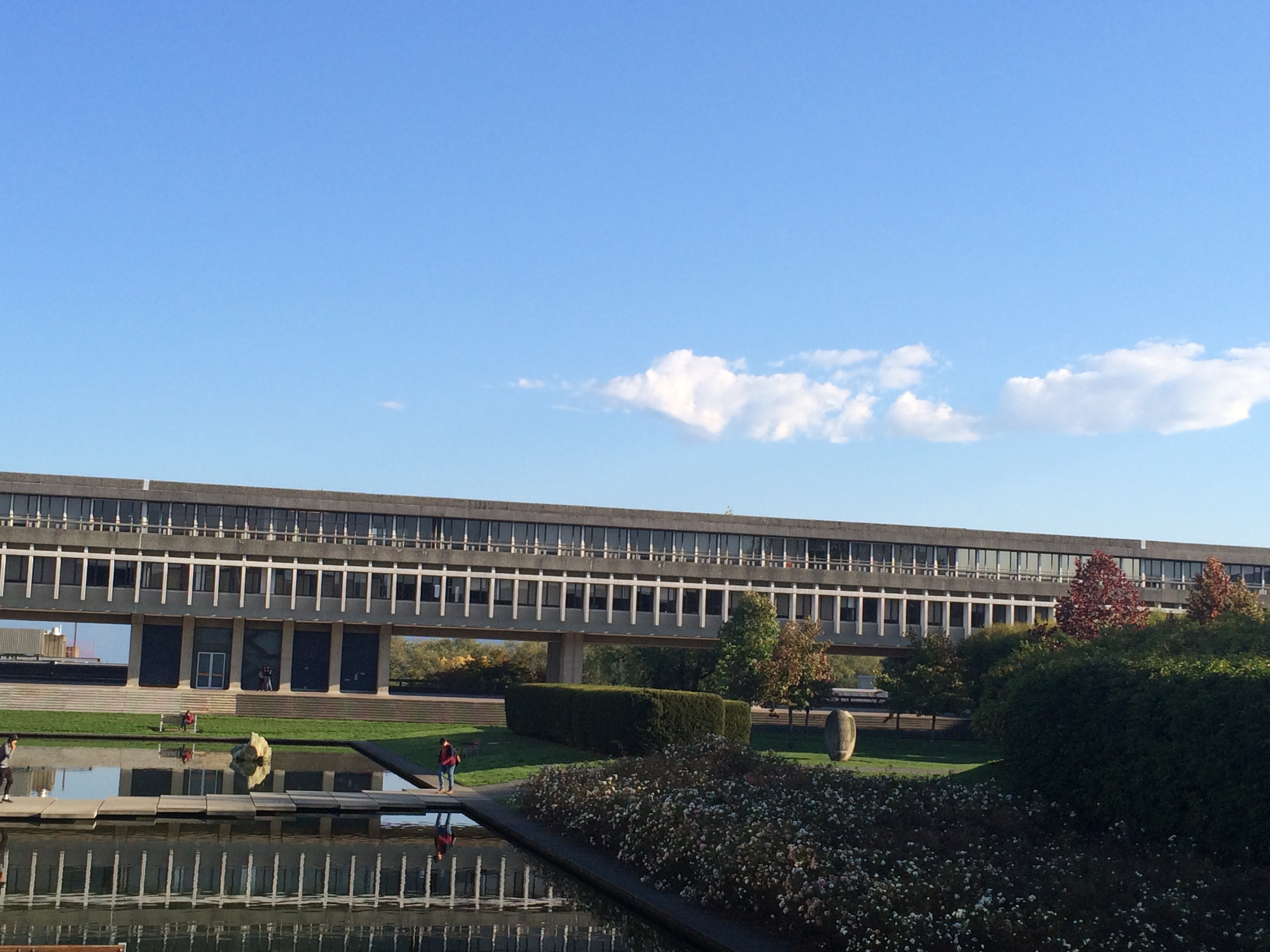
Simon Fraser University, Burnaby, BC

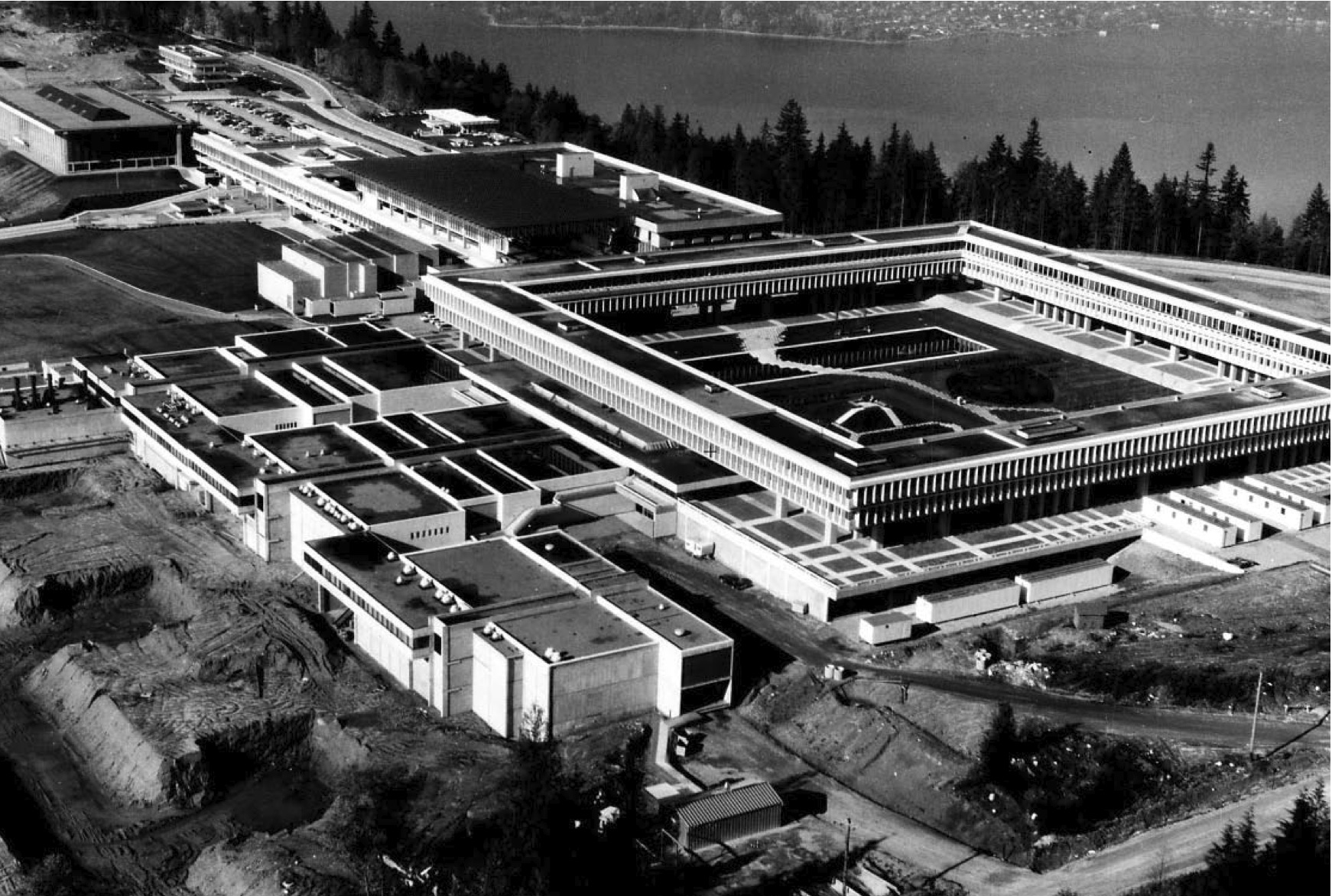
Simon Fraser University, Burnaby, BC

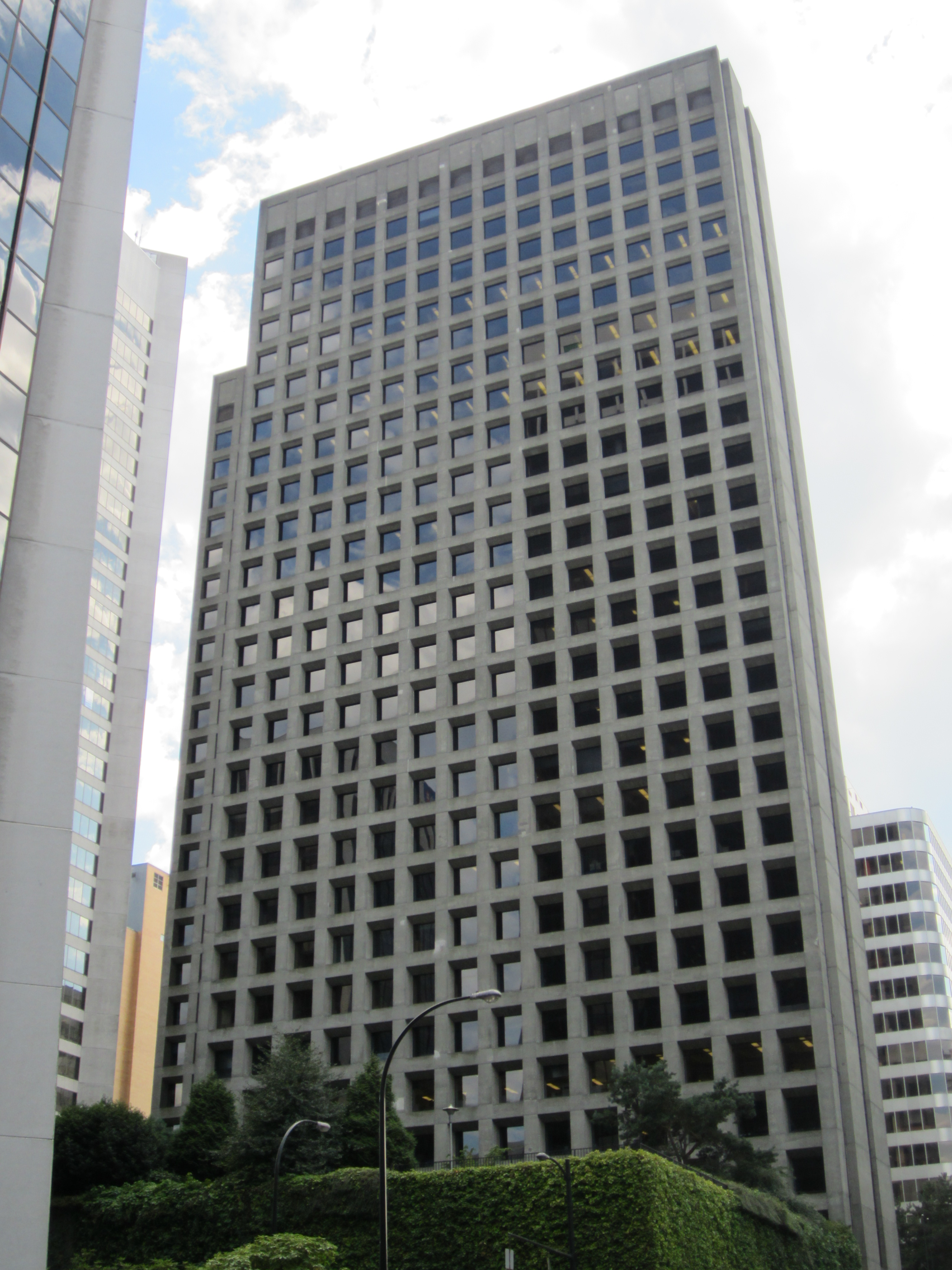
Macmillan Bloedel Building, Vancouver, BC

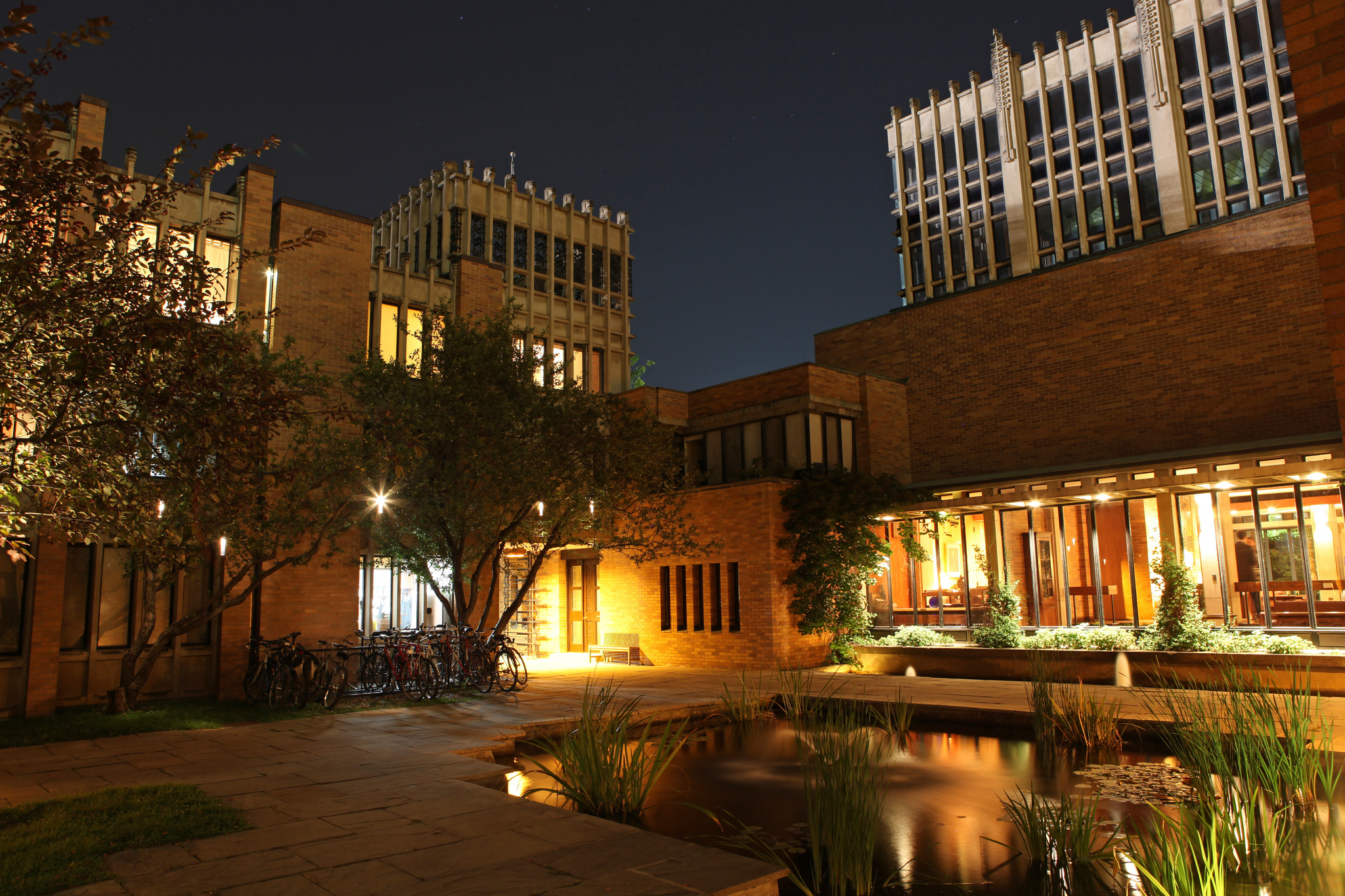
Massey College, University of Toronto, Toronto, ON

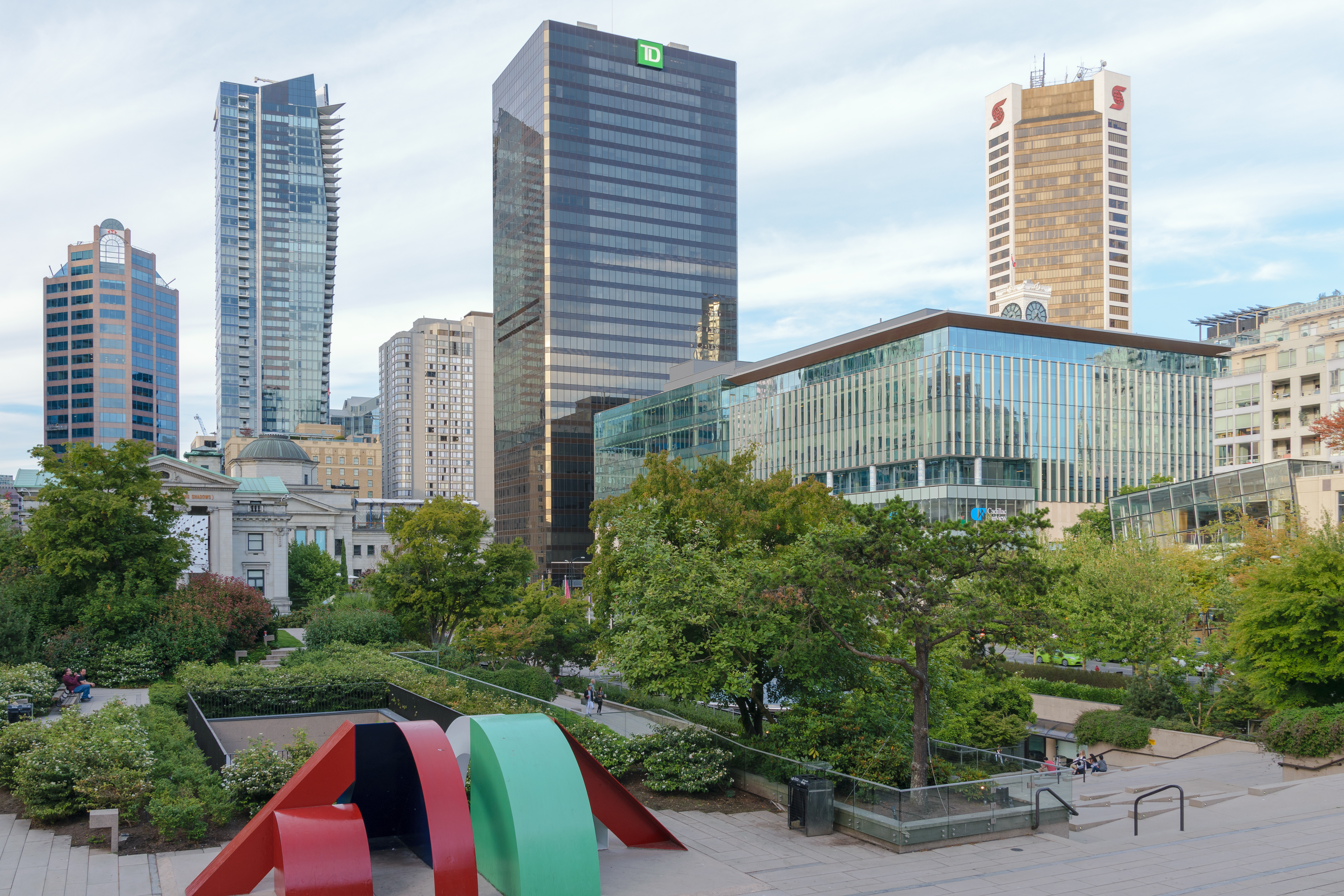
Robson Square, Vancouver, BC
