= Bob Rennie =

Canadian businessman

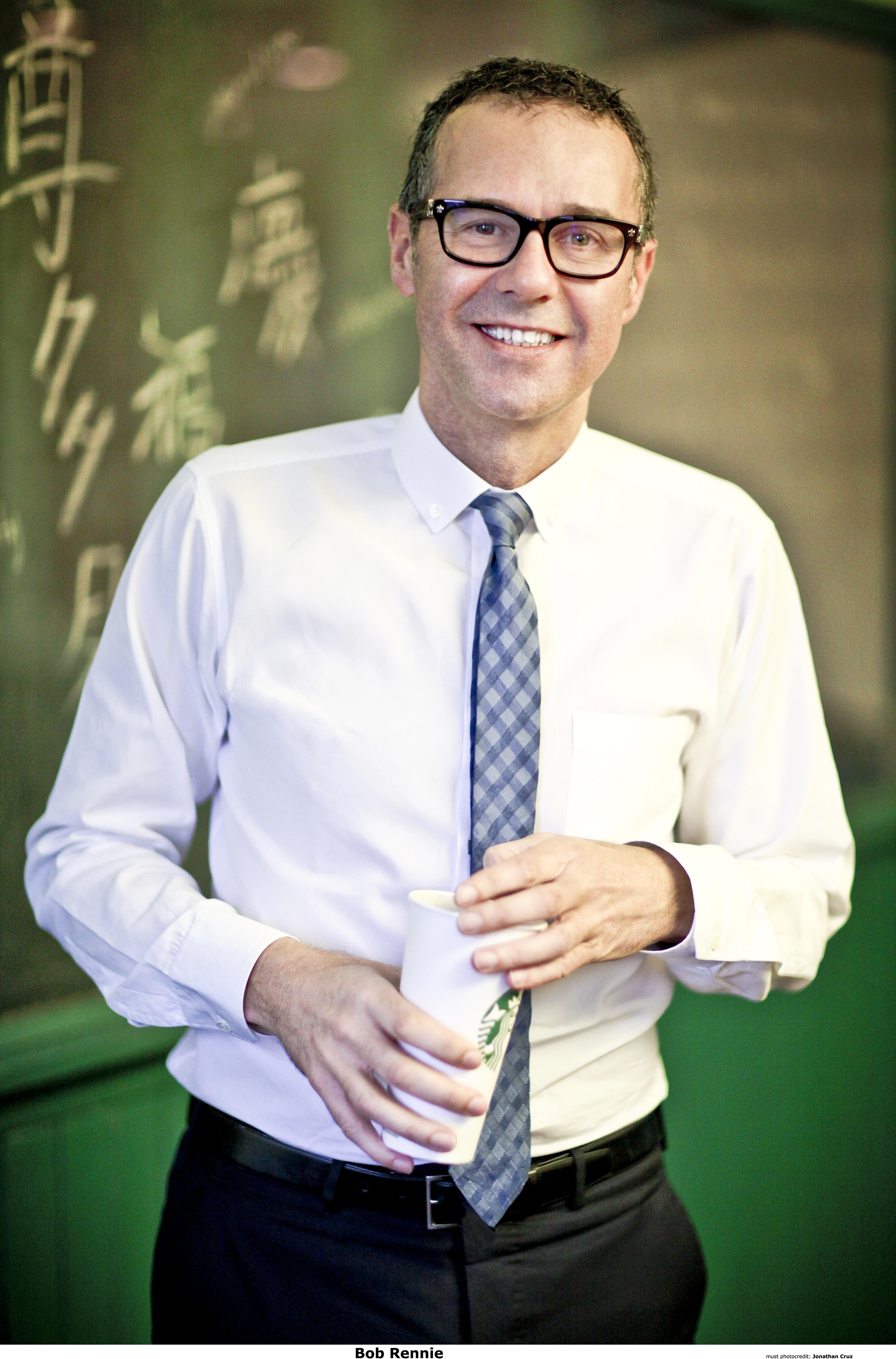
Bob Rennie

Bob Rennie (born 1956) is an art collector and a real estate marketer based in Vancouver, British Columbia. He is the founder and executive director of Rennie, a Vancouver based real estate marketing firm. The company's business divisions include Rennie developer services, Rennie consumer services (real estate brokerage), Rennie advisory services, Rennie rental services and technology. He is known colloquially as the "condo king". Rennie is deeply involved in the art community locally and internationally, and he maintained his own art museum in Chinatown's Wing Sang building until fairly recently gifting it to the Chinese History Society.

== Life ==
Bob Rennie was born in 1956 and raised in East Vancouver on East 5th. His mother was a homemaker and waitress, and his father a truck driver for Carling Brewery. Rennie started selling East Side homes at the age of 19. He began selling condos in Vancouver in 1990 with Dan Ulinder, forming Ulinder Rennie Project Marketing. In 1997 Rennie bought out Ulinder and established Rennie Marketing Systems.

Bob Rennie lives in Vancouver with his family, including his son Kris Rennie who is president of Rennie.

== Projects ==
He has marketed such projects as Fairmont Pacific Rim, Living Shangri-La (Vancouver's tallest tower) and Vancouver's 2010 Olympic Village. Other projects include the Woodward's Building and One Wall Centre.

== Arts ==
=== Rennie Collection ===
Rennie Collection, one of the largest collections of contemporary art in Canada, has evolved since 1974, when the first acquisition was made, to focus on works related to identity, social injustice, appropriation, painting and photography. The collection is dedicated not only to the acquisition of established international artists, but also the work of emerging artists. Currently, there are approximately 48 artists collected in depth with over 370 artists in total. The collection, while based in Vancouver, is usually spread across the globe, on loan to institutions like Guggenheim Museum New York, Metropolitan Museum of Art, Centre Georges Pompidou, Smithsonian and Tate, amongst many others.

A former chair of the North America Acquisitions Committee (NAAC) at Tate Museum in London, Rennie currently serves on the Executive Committee of the Tate International Council. In 2015, Rennie joined the Board of Trustees at The Art Institute of Chicago. Rennie sits on the Dean's Advisory Board to the Faculty of Arts at the University of British Columbia since 2003 and the University Art Committee since 2006 and is a former member of the Board of Governors at Emily Carr University of Art and Design. Since 2015, Rennie has been featured in ArtNews Magazine's annual top 200 collectors list.

=== Wing Sang Building ===
Rennie had a museum in Chinatown's Wing Sang building, the oldest (1889) building in Chinatown. Four years and over $10 million were spent renovating the building to transform the heritage landmark into an exhibit space for the Rennie Collection, open to the public free of charge. On top of the museum was an art piece by world-renowned artist Martin Creed, "EVERYTHING IS GOING TO BE ALRIGHT" (Work No 850). Creed's installation inspired the title of Julia Kwan's 2014 documentary film about Chinatown, Everything Will Be, in which Rennie is interviewed.

The first Dan Graham pavilion in Canada used to sit on the roof of the museum. There is also a sculpture by Thomas Houseago.

The Wing Sang Building received multiple awards including the 2010 Architectural Institute of British Columbia Special Jury Award, the 2011 City of Vancouver Heritage Award and the 2012 Vancouver Heritage Foundation Honour for Exceptional Heritage Conservation.

=== Rennie and the Vancouver Art Gallery ===
Rennie is a vocal opponent to the proposed move of the Vancouver Art Gallery from the current location in Robson Square to a newly constructed building on the city-owned Larwill Park (formerly the bus depot) next to the Queen Elizabeth Theatre. He questions the fiscal responsibility of the move, estimated to cost $400 million, as well as the plan to hire an international architect.

== Controversy ==
Rennie has been criticized for trying to gentrify Vancouver's Downtown Eastside, one of the poorest communities in Canada, with the Woodward's Building project, which includes 536 condominiums and 200 non-market homes. Critics said that the project pushed residents out and increased rent for the neediest members of the city.

Rennie is also the marketer for condominiums at the former 2010 Olympic Village, a project that has been the subject of controversy and extensive media attention around the project's financial challenges for several years.

Since 2004, he has accumulated over two hundred parking tickets, of which he refers to as "the cost of being busy", all of which have been paid.

Amidst a growing housing affordability crisis in the run-up to the 2014 Vancouver municipal election, Rennie raised eyebrows and some outrage organizing an exclusive $25,000 a plate lunch for developer colleagues to have a private audience with then-mayor Gregor Robertson. The $25k lunch became the subject of a popular local internet meme.

== Charitable causes ==
In 2012, Rennie made a major contribution to the National Gallery of Canada with his donation of Brian Jungen's 2004 artwork Court. Consisting of 210–240 factory sewing tabletops repainted to look like a basketball court, the work has previously never been shown in Canada. A further 197 artworks were donated to the National Gallery of Canada in honour of Canada's 150th anniversary. The works, by some of the most internationally recognized Canadian artists (Geoffrey Farmer, Rodney Graham, Brian Jungen, Damian Moppett and Ian Wallace) as well as globally acclaimed artist Doris Salcedo, are valued at more than $12 million.

As well as his extensive work with museums and art-related organizations, Rennie has sat on the board for the Streetohome Foundation, a local organization that aims to help ensure the homeless in Vancouver have access to safe, decent, affordable housing and support services. Rennie is also a noted supporter of Vancouver General Hospital. His past memberships include the University of British Columbia Art Committee, Board of Governors for Emily Carr University and Commissioner of BC Housing Management Commission Board. His current memberships include Council for Canadian American Relations (CCAR), BCIT Inspire Campaign Cabinet, British Columbia Centre on Abuse Community Engagement Board, Urban Development Institute (UDI), Peter P. Dhillon Centre for Business Ethics Advisory Board and Mayor's Economic Advisory Committee.

== Awards ==
Rennie is consistently listed in Vancouver Magazine's annual Power 50; in 2011 he was named No. 8. In 2002 he was a recipient of the Queen Elizabeth II Golden Jubilee Medal, and in 2012 the Queen Elizabeth II Diamond Jubilee Medal, both of which are awarded to Canadians who have made a significant contribution to their fellow citizens, their community, or to Canada. Simon Fraser University awarded him the 2012 Chancellor's Distinguished Service Award, "for his role in bringing the Woodward's redevelopment—and SFU's new home for the School for the Contemporary Arts—to fruition."

In recognition of his dedication to the arts and art community, Rennie received an honorary doctorate of letters from Emily Carr University of Art and Design in 2008. Rennie was awarded the Order of British Columbia in 2014 for demonstrating "exceptional dedication to strengthening and enhancing arts and culture in BC."

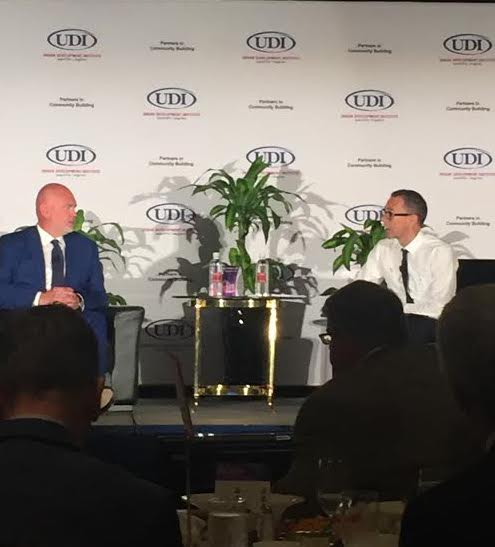
On May 17, 2018, Rennie interviewed MSNBC political commentator Steve Schmidt in Vancouver at Urban Development Institute's sold-out event.
