= Wall Centre (Vancouver) =

Development in Vancouver, British Columbia

Sheraton Vancouver Wall Centre
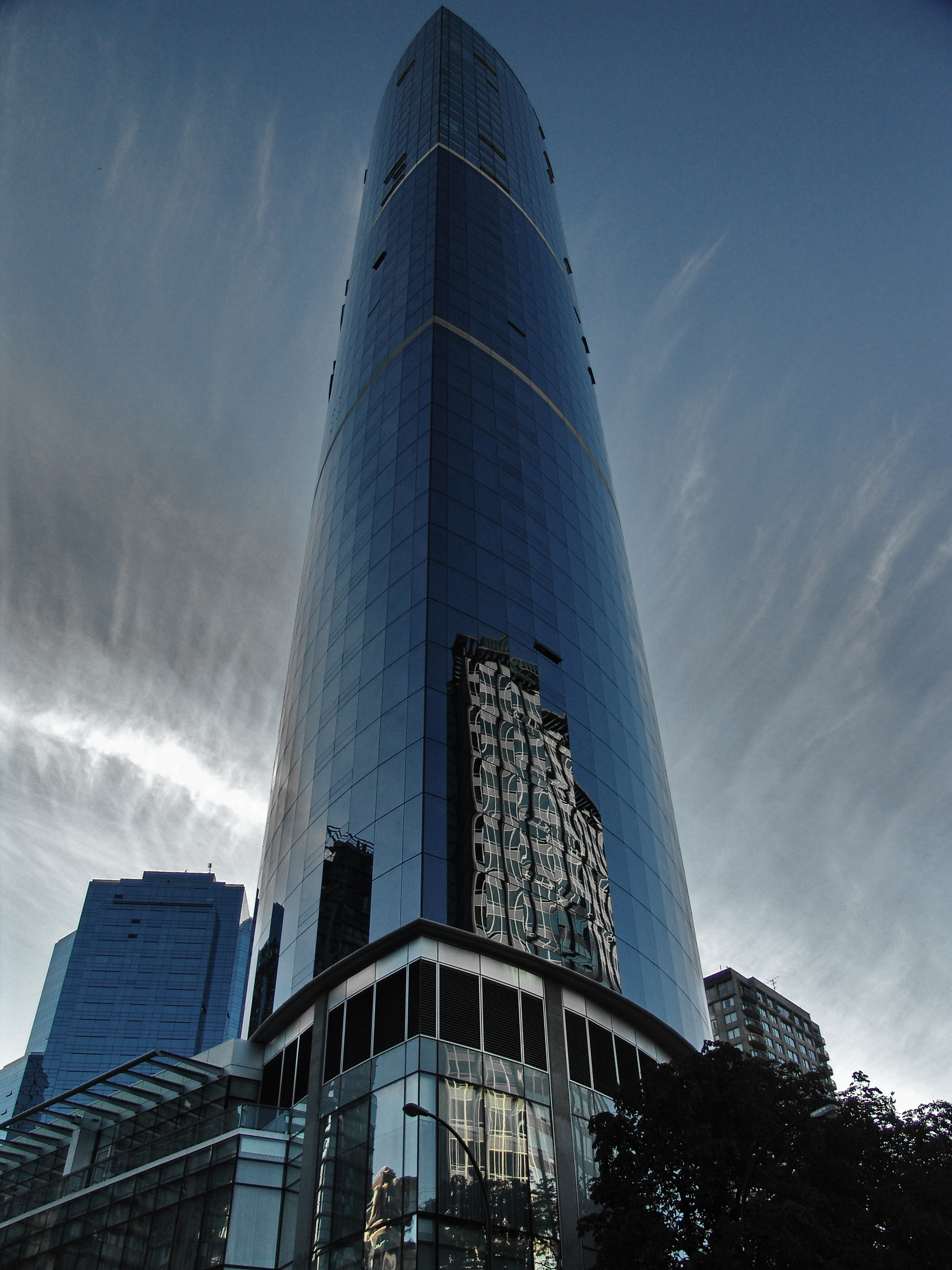
- One Wall Centre tower in foreground, residential tower to the left of it
- Interactive map of the Sheraton Vancouver Wall Centre area

General information
- Location: Vancouver, British Columbia, 1088 Burrard Street
- Coordinates: 49.28044°N 123.12572°W
- Opening: 2001
- Owner: Wall Financial Corporation
- Management: Sheraton Hotels

Design and construction
- Architects: Bruno Freschi; Chris Doray

Other information
- Number of rooms: 733

Website
- Official website

Wall Centre is a development in Vancouver, British Columbia consisting of three towers which contain the Sheraton Vancouver Wall Centre Hotel, as well as condominiums. It is owned by Wall Financial Corporation and was largely the vision of Peter Wall. The complex covers an entire city block, and has a large public garden.

== Structures ==
The three buildings are:

- One Wall Centre - at 518 feet, the third tallest tower in Vancouver. It contains hotel rooms for the Sheraton on the first 27 floors, Club Intrawest Resort floors; on floors 28–30, and condominiums on floors 31 to 48. The tower is also known as the Sheraton Vancouver Wall Centre North Tower.
- Sheraton Vancouver Wall Centre South Tower - 335 feet, containing more guest rooms for the Sheraton.
- 1050 Burrard Street - a tower virtually identical to the Sheraton South Tower, containing condominiums.

== Sheraton Vancouver Wall Centre ==
The Sheraton Vancouver Wall Centre is located in two of the three towers of the complex, as well as in a low-rise building containing meeting rooms and restaurants. The Sheraton's grand ballroom is located underground, beneath the public garden. It is the third tallest hotel in the city and has 733 rooms.
