= Hilton Vancouver Downtown =

Hotel in Vancouver, Canada

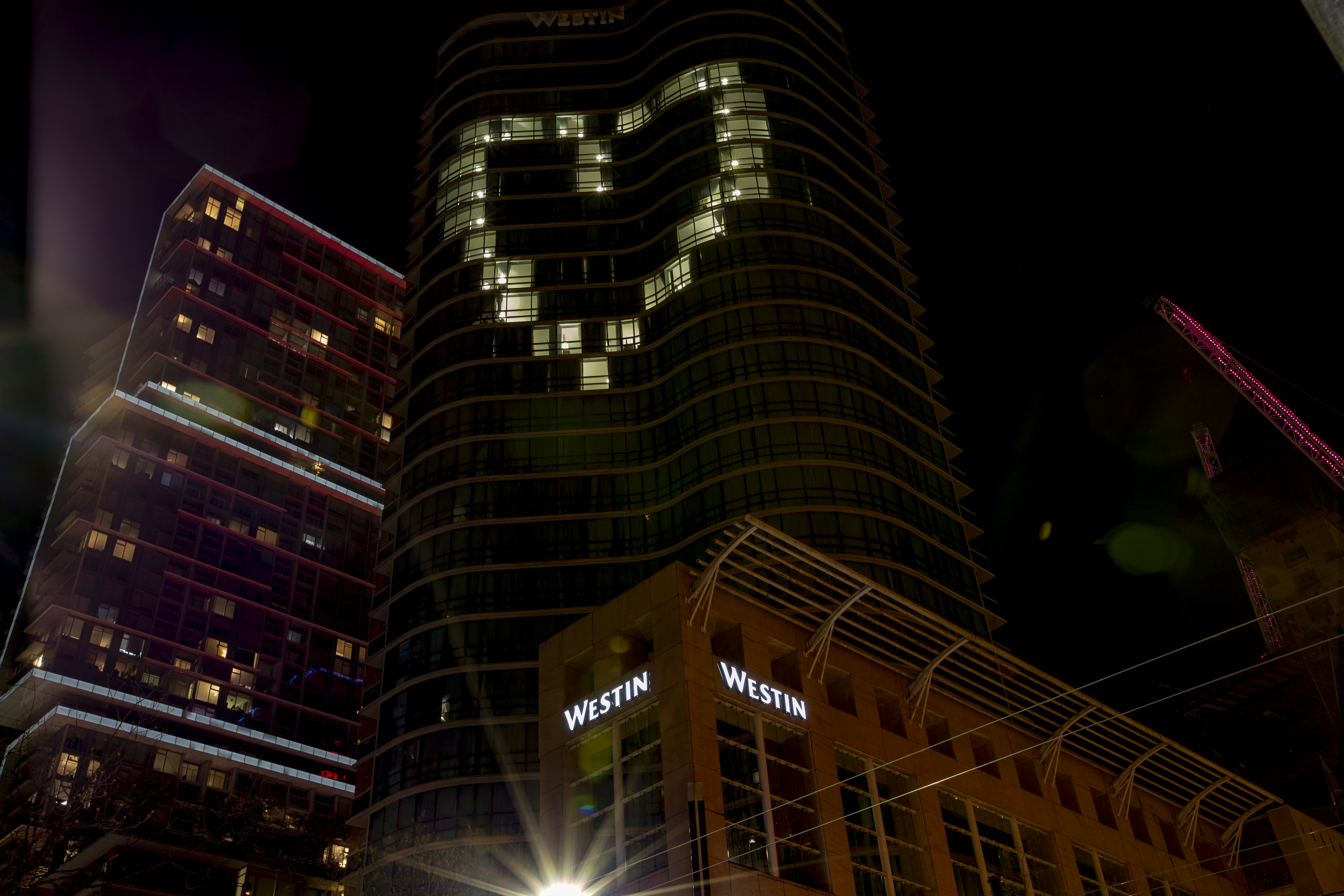
- Interactive map of the Hilton Vancouver Downtown area
- Hotel chain: Hilton Hotels

General information
- Location: 433 Robson Street; Vancouver, British Columbia; V6B 6L9
- Coordinates: 49.2798°N 123.11696°W
- Opening: 1999 (27 years ago)
- Owner: Pacific Reach Properties

Technical details
- Floor count: 33

Design and construction
- Architect: Bruno Freschi

Other information
- Number of suites: 207
- Number of restaurants: One

Website
- westingrandvancouver.com

The Hilton Vancouver Downtown is a hotel in the Canadian city of Vancouver, British Columbia. It is located in the Yaletown neighbourhood at the intersection of Homer Street and Robson Street. It was built in 1999 as The Westin Grand, Vancouver and was rebranded as a Hilton in January 2021.

== Facilities ==
The hotel's facilities include six meeting rooms, a fitness centre, an outdoor saltwater pool and a hot tub. The hotel is also home to Hendricks Resto-Lounge, a 100-seat restaurant located on the second floor. The building was designed by Bruno Freschi Architects and Lawrence Doyle Young & Wright Architects.

== See also ==
- List of tallest buildings in Vancouver
