= Bruno Freschi =

Canadian architect (born 1937)

- Born: April 18, 1937 (age 89); Trail, British Columbia, Canada
- Education: University of British Columbia
- Occupation: Architect
- Awards: Officer of the Order of Canada
- Practice: Bruno Freschi Architects
- Projects: Expo 86

Bruno Freschi OC (born 1937) is a Canadian architect and an officer in the Order of Canada, known for his role as chief architect for Expo 86 in Vancouver, British Columbia, Canada. Some of his notable works include Science World in Vancouver, the Ismaili Centre in Burnaby, and the Staples Residence in Vancouver.

== Early life ==
Freschi was born in Trail, British Columbia, on April 18, 1937, in an Italian-Canadian family. He graduated from J. Lloyd Crowe Secondary School in Trail, BC, before going to study architecture at the University of British Columbia where he received Canada's top architecture student award. He graduated in 1961 with a Bachelor of Architecture degree. He then studied in London at the Architectural Association before returning to Vancouver, British Columbia.

== Career ==
Freschi started his career working with Canadian architects Arthur Erickson and Geoffrey Massey in the 1960s. He founded his own firm, Bruno Freschi Architects, in 1970 in Vancouver. He was dean of the school of architecture and planning at the State University of New York at Buffalo, NY, USA until 2002.

Freschi's work explores mediums as a form of expressionism. He also explores themes for politics and urbanization through painting and sculpture. His exhibition, 'Body Politick: The Art & Architecture of Bruno Freschi' opened on June 28, 2018, at Il Museo inside the Italian Cultural Centre in Vancouver.

In 1985, Freschi was named an Officer of the Order of Canada for his contributions to architecture. In addition to his work as the chief architect and planner for Expo 86, the award's citation noted that he had "stimulated visual thinking with his energy, enthusiasm and creative flair in a diversity of structures and has been an inspiration to a new generation of architects".

== Personal life ==
Freschi married Vaune Ainsworth in the late 1980s. The couple live in Blaine, Washington, in a self-designed home. In 2007, Freschi was diagnosed with cancer, undergoing a seven-hour surgery that left him reliant on a cane. Freschi remains active in art and occasional architectural projects.

== Works ==
- 1966 - Designs the Staples Residence in West Vancouver, an icon of west coast modern architecture.
- 1985 - Completes the architecture, design, and construction of the Vancouver Ismaili Centre for His Highness the Aga Khan.
- 1986 - Master Planner & Chief Architect, Expo 86.
Master plan, Expo 86, Vancouver, British Columbia

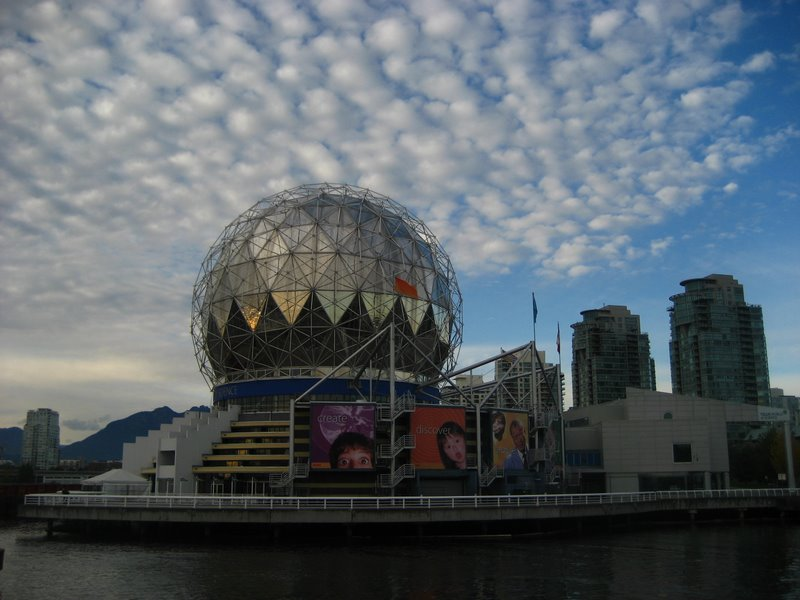
Science World at Telus World of Science, Vancouver, British Columbia

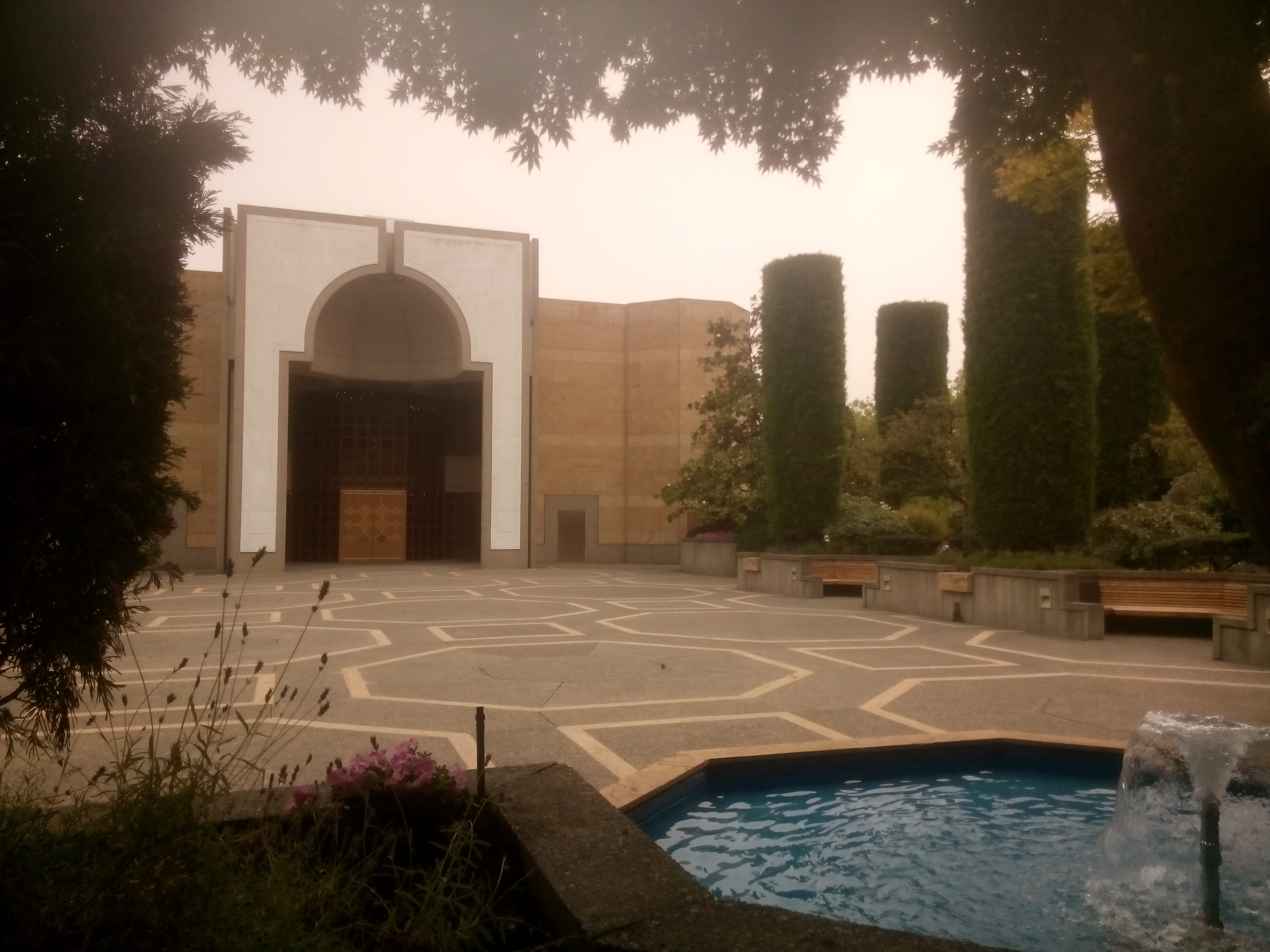
The Ismaili Centre, Burnaby, Burnaby, British Columbia

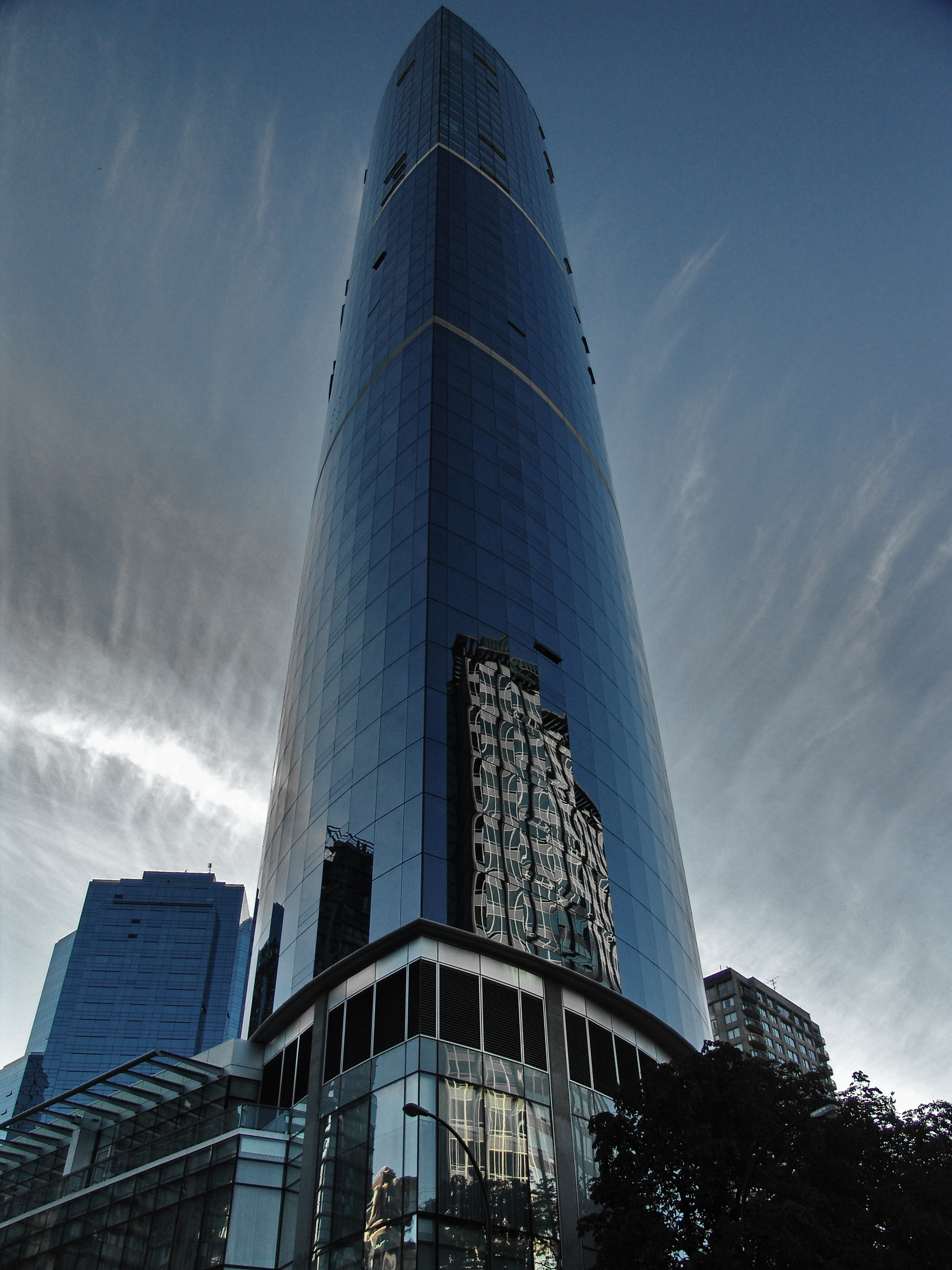
Wall Centre, Vancouver, British Columbia

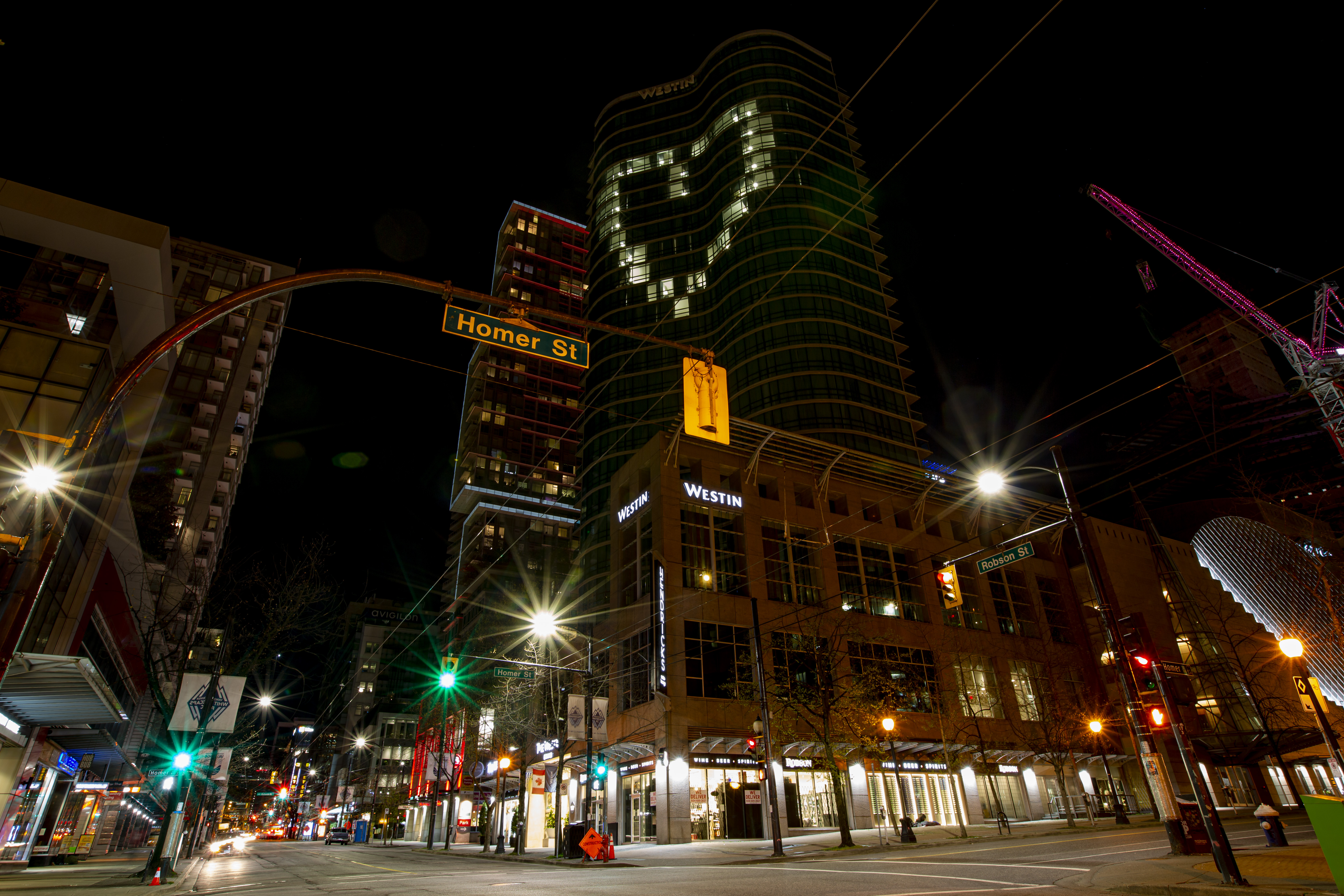
The Westin Grand, Vancouver, British Columbia
