= One Wall Centre =

Skyscraper hotel in Vancouver, British Columbia

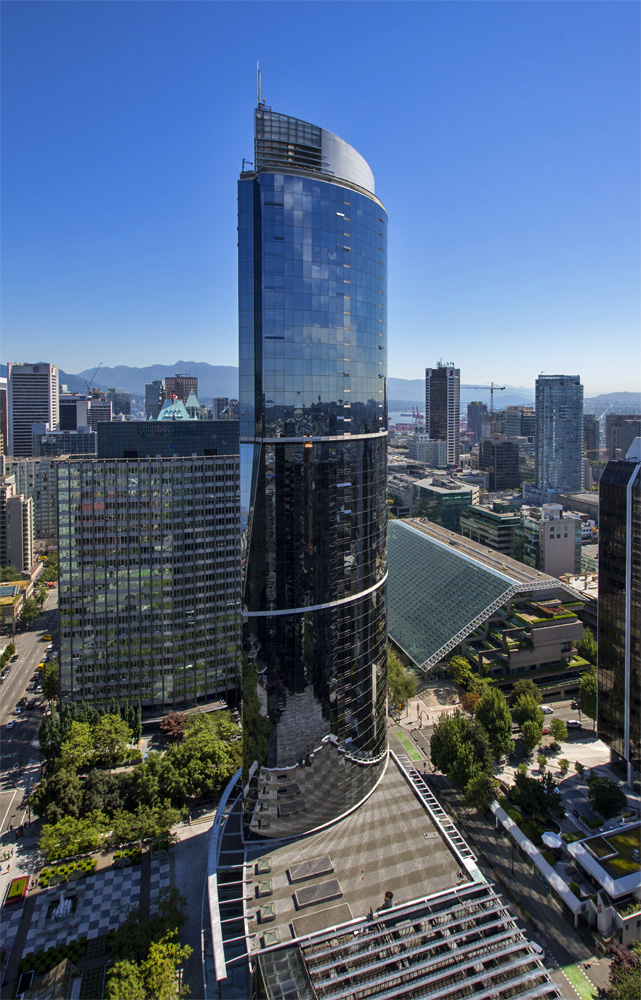
- Interactive map of the One Wall Centre area

General information
- Status: Completed
- Type: Residential / Hotel
- Architectural style: Modernism
- Location: 1088 Burrard Street; Vancouver, British Columbia, Canada
- Coordinates: 49.28046°N 123.1270°W
- Construction started: 1998
- Completed: 2001

Height
- Antenna spire: 157.8 m (518 ft)
- Roof: 149.8 m (491 ft)

Technical details
- Floor count: 48
- Floor area: 42,955 m^{2} (462,360 sq ft)
- Lifts/elevators: 8

Design and construction
- Architect: Perkins and Will
- Developer: Wall Financial Corporation
- Structural engineer: Glotman•Simpson Consulting Engineers
- Main contractor: Siemens Development

Other information
- Number of units: Rooms = 746; Suites = 70; Condo = 74

Website
- www.onewallcentre.ca

One Wall Centre, also known as the Sheraton Vancouver Wall Centre North Tower, is a 48-storey, 157.8 m (518 ft) skyscraper hotel with residential condominiums in the Wall Centre development at 1088 Burrard Street in Downtown Vancouver, British Columbia, Canada. The tower was designed by Perkins+Will Canada, and completed in 2001, and went on to win the Emporis Skyscraper Award for the Best New Skyscraper the same year. As of 2023 it is the sixth-tallest building in the city.

The first 27 floors of the building are the 4 Diamond Sheraton Hotel. Floors 28, 29, and 30 are the Club Intrawest Resort floors; which are operated independent of Sheraton. Floors 31 to 48 are residential condominiums. The One Wall Centre tower is part of the Wall Centre complex owned by Wall Financial Corporation and was largely the vision of Peter Wall.

== Construction ==
To counteract possible harmonic swaying during high winds, One Wall has a tuned water damping system at the top level of the building which consists of two specially designed 50,000-imperial-gallon (60,000 U.S. gal; 227,300 L) water tanks. These tanks are designed so that the harmonic frequency of the sloshing of the water in the tanks counteracts the harmonic frequency of the swaying of the building.

The Sheraton Wall Centre required a 23 m (75 ft) deep excavation — the deepest excavation prior to Living Shangri-La for a building in the city.

According to the June 2004 edition of Elevator World, Richmond Elevator Maintenance Ltd. won a contract for the lowest bid to supply the building's elevators, one of the local elevator firm's first examples of traction elevators. The installation features 10 elevators, 8 of which are high speed geared machines. The hotel is served by four 1,400 kg (3,100 lb) traction elevators at 244 m/min (800 ft/min), with a group of 3 for public usage and a single private VIP access elevator. There are also two hotel service elevators with 1,800 kg (4,000 lb) capacity each at 213 m/min (700 ft/min). The apartments are served by 2 elevators, each with a capacity of 1,600 kg (3,500 lb) at 305 m/min (1,000 ft/min). There are also 2 roped hydraulic elevators: the 1,400 kg (3,100 lb) to serve the parking garage, and the 2,300 kg (5,100 lb) to serve the banquet floors. There are 6 escalators installed by Fujitec.

During construction, as the building's glass was completed on the lower floors, construction was stopped as the City of Vancouver disagreed with the dark colour of glass that being applied. The building was completed with the upper floors a more translucent shade of glass, resulting in a two-toned appearance. The translucent windows were ultimately defective and replaced with darker windows, resulting in a uniform appearance of the building, in 2013.

== Gallery ==
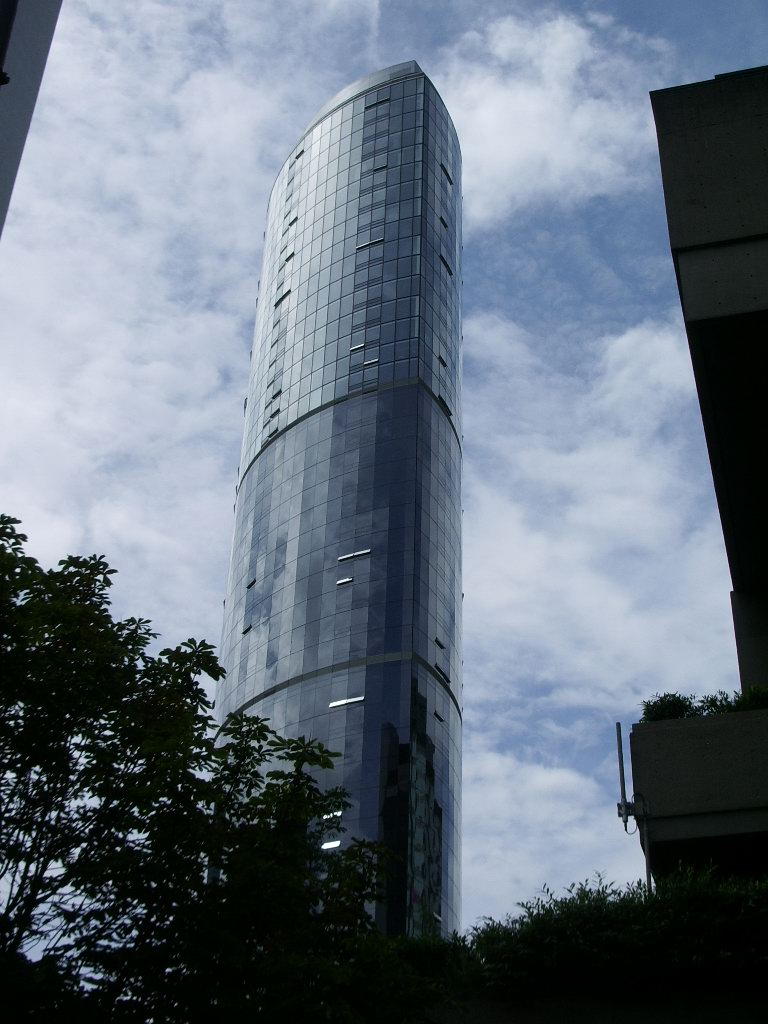

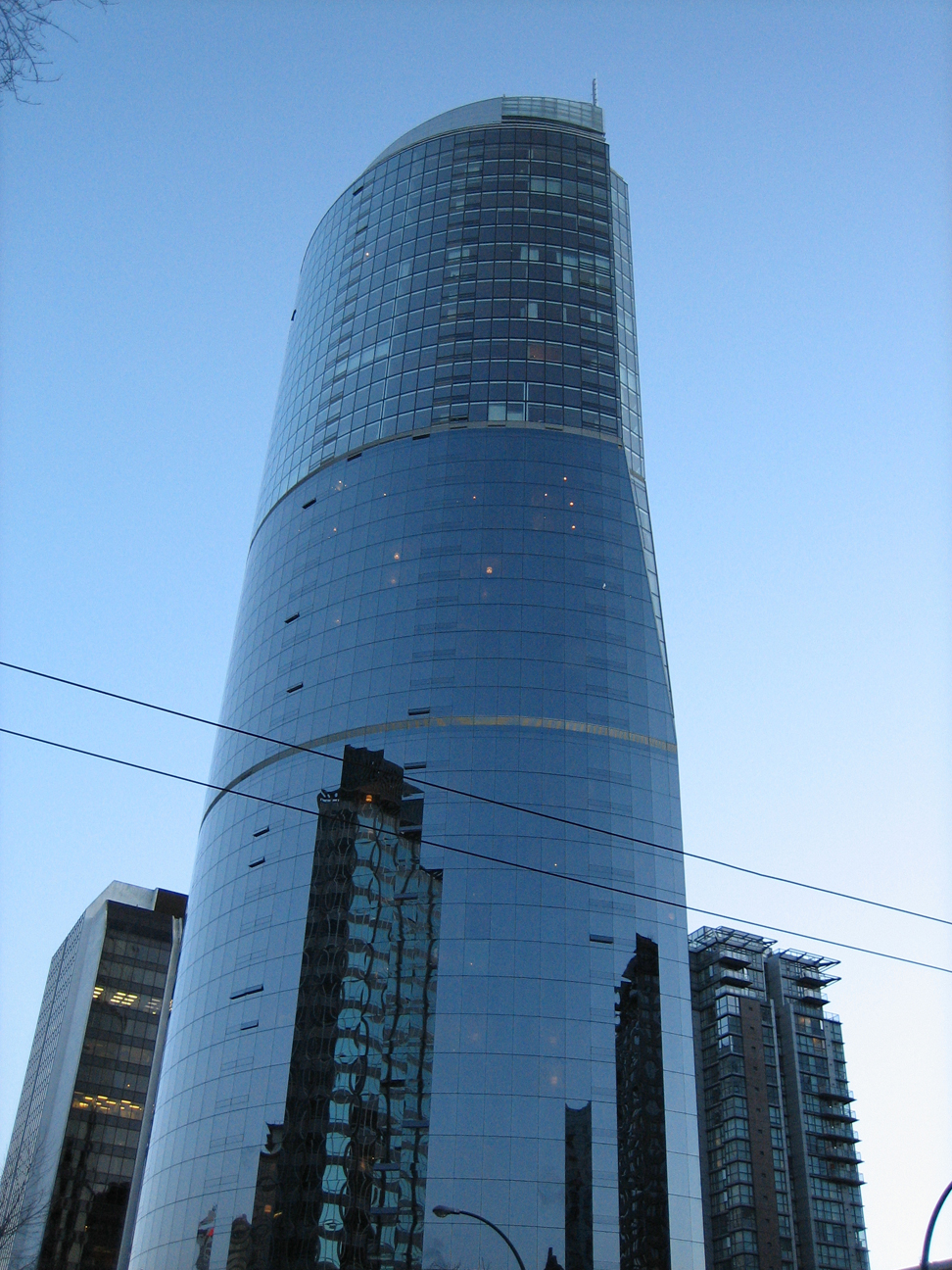

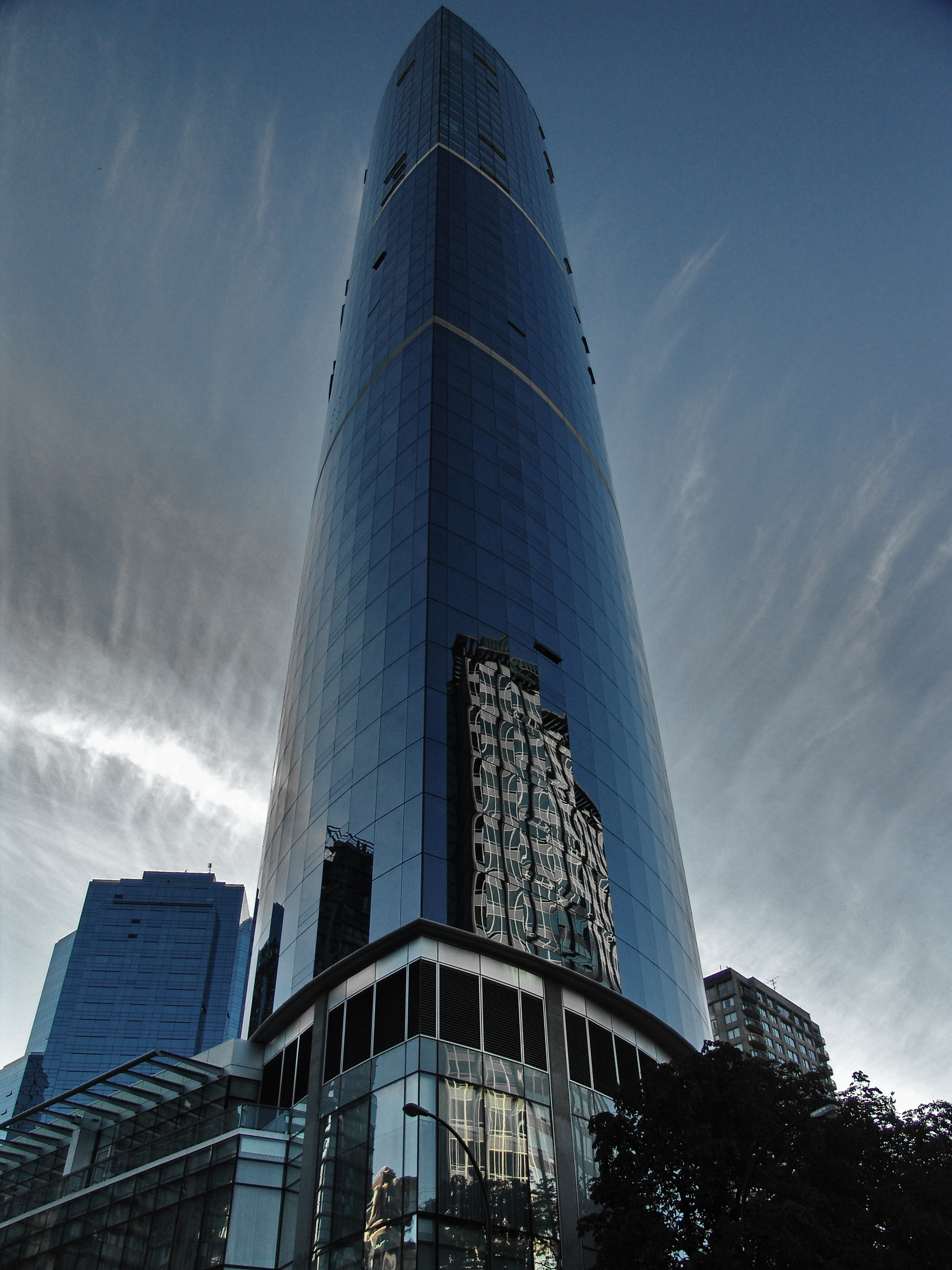

== See also ==
- List of tallest buildings in Vancouver
