= Living Shangri-La =

Mixed-use skyscraper in Vancouver, British Columbia

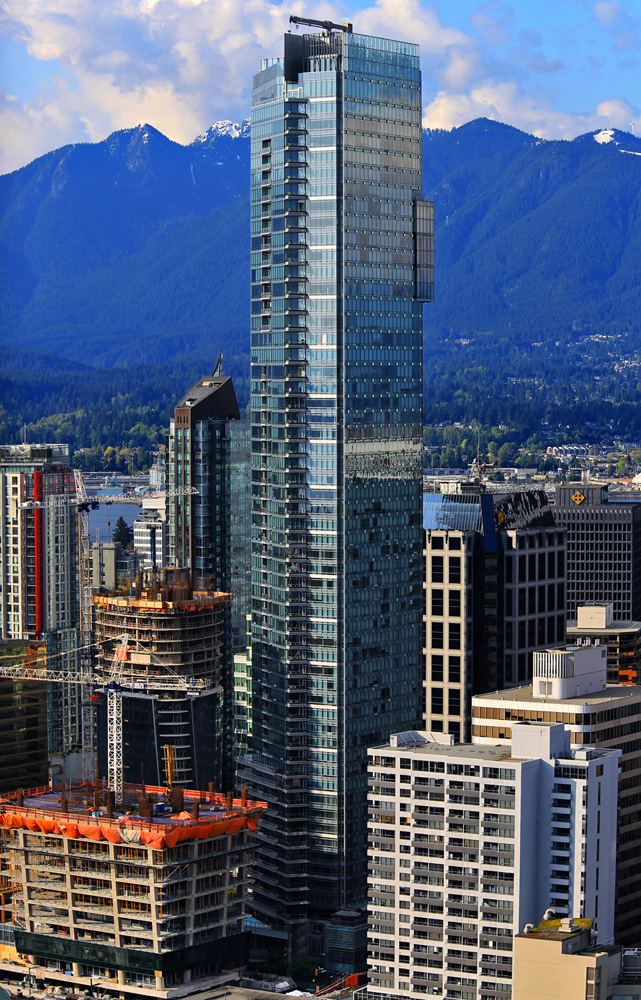
- Living Shangri-La in 2014

General information
- Status: Completed
- Type: Mixed-use: Hotel, Residential, Office
- Location: 1128 West Georgia Street; Vancouver, British Columbia; V6E 0A8
- Coordinates: 49°17′09″N 123°07′25″W
- Construction started: 2005
- Completed: 2008
- Cost: CDN$ 350 million

Height
- Antenna spire: 200.86 m (659 ft)
- Roof: 197 m (646 ft)

Technical details
- Floor count: 57
- Floor area: 61,300 square metres (659,828 sq ft)

Design and construction
- Architect: James K. M. Cheng Architects Inc.
- Developer: Westbank Projects Corp.

Website
- Official website

Shangri-la Hotel, Vancouver

General information
- Opening: January 24, 2009
- Operator: Shangri-La Hotels & Resorts

Technical details
- Floor count: 15

Design and construction
- Developer: Peterson Investment Group & Westbank Projects Corp.

Other information
- Number of rooms: 119
- North America's first Shangri-la property.

Living Shangri-La is a mixed-use skyscraper in downtown Vancouver, British Columbia, Canada. It is the tallest building in the city proper, though not in the metro area, as Two Gilmore Place in Burnaby is taller as of its completion in 2024. The 62-storey Shangri-La tower contains a 5-star hotel and its offices on the first 15 floors, with condominium apartment units occupying the rest of the tower. The building's podium complex also includes a spa, Urban Fare specialty grocery store, a Vancouver Art Gallery public display, and a curated public sculpture garden. The high-rise stands 200.86 metres (659 ft) tall and there is a private roof garden on floor 61.

As part of the development deal, the Coastal Church, built in 1919 and located at the west end of the site, underwent a $4.4 million restoration.

== Hotel ==
The Shangri-La Hotel Vancouver is a full-service hotel that is part of the building. It is a member of the Shangri-La Hotels and Resorts chain, and is Shangri-La's first North American property. The hotel occupies floors Ground to 15 with 119 rooms (including a presidential suite on the 15th floor). There is no 4th or 13th floor. The hotel includes 5-star services such as restaurants, shops, and Chi The Spa at Shangri-La. As of July 1st, 2025, the property is no longer operating under the SHangri-La title and has since transitioned into the Hyatt Vancouver Downtown Alberni, the fifth Hyatt in British Columbia, with plans to become a Park Hyatt in late 2026 following a multi-million dollar renovation.

== Residences ==
Living Shangri-La also contains 307 residential units, consisting of 234 general live-work homes on floors 16 to 43 and 63 private access residential units on floors 44–60 with two duplex penthouses on floors 61/62. The condominium units are accessible from the entrance at 1128 West Georgia Street and 1111 Alberni Street.

== Construction ==
The project required 3.1 million man-hours of employment, 15,000 truckloads of earth excavated, 51,000 cubic metres (1,800,000 cu ft) of concrete, and 7,000 metric tons (6,900 long tons; 7,700 short tons) of reinforcing steel. During the height of construction activity, 1,000 workers were on site constructing one floor per week. The Shangri-La set Vancouver's record for the deepest excavation of 26 m (85 ft), defeating the past record of 23 m (75 ft) set by the One Wall Centre, and it officially became the tallest building in Vancouver on October 2, 2007. The total cost of this building was near CA$350 million. The tower crane on top of the building was fitted with Christmas lights on November 13, 2007, and was the tallest crane illuminated in Vancouver in 2007.

A windstorm on January 15, 2008, caused loose construction materials to blow off the building and into the streets below. Parked vehicles were damaged by falling plywood, but there were no injuries. The neighbouring Terasen Gas building also sustained damage in the storm. Police closed off West Georgia Street for over twelve hours.

The development was marketed by Bob Rennie of Rennie Marketing Systems.

== Cultural references ==
The building was featured in the 2010 film Tron: Legacy as the headquarters of the fictional company ENCOM International.

== Gallery ==
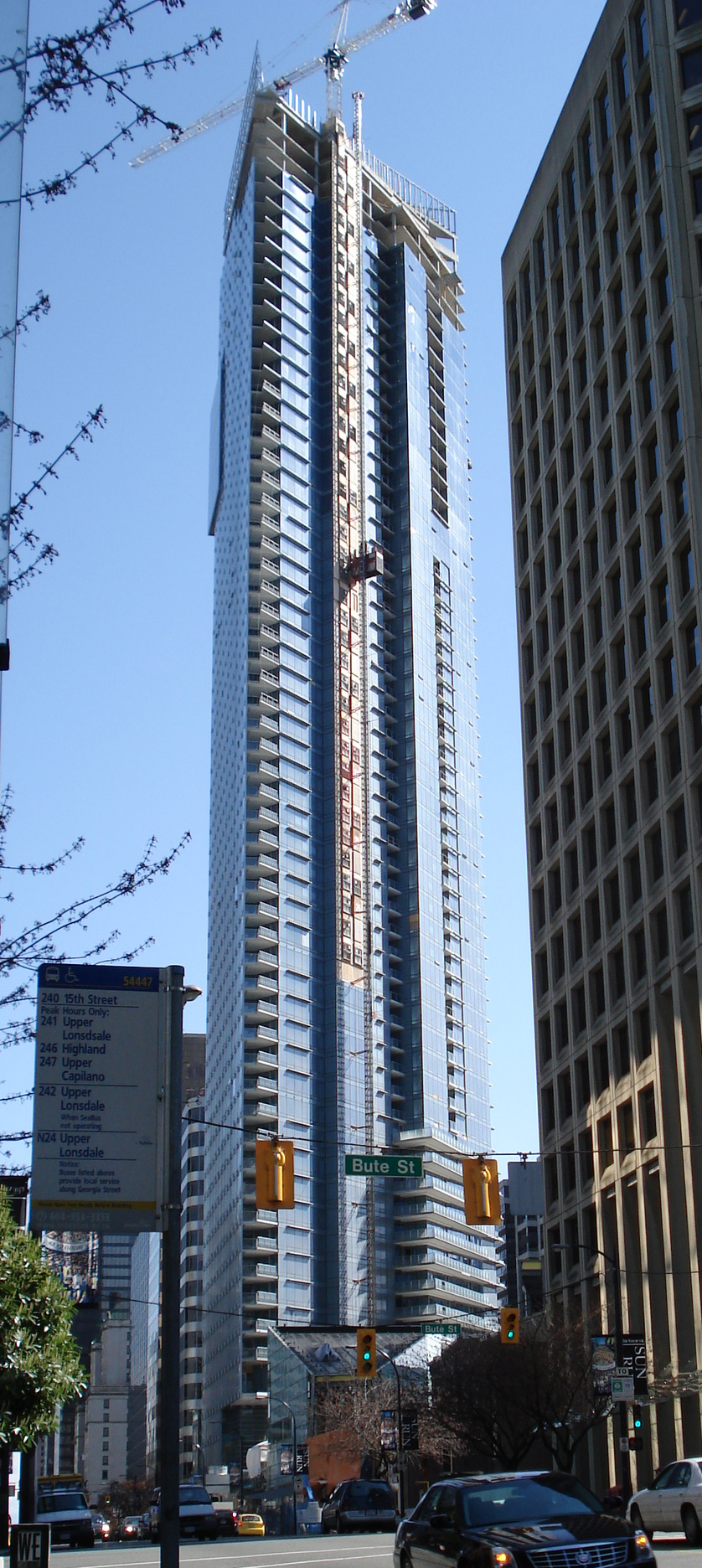
The Shangri-La Vancouver in the final stages of construction in 2008

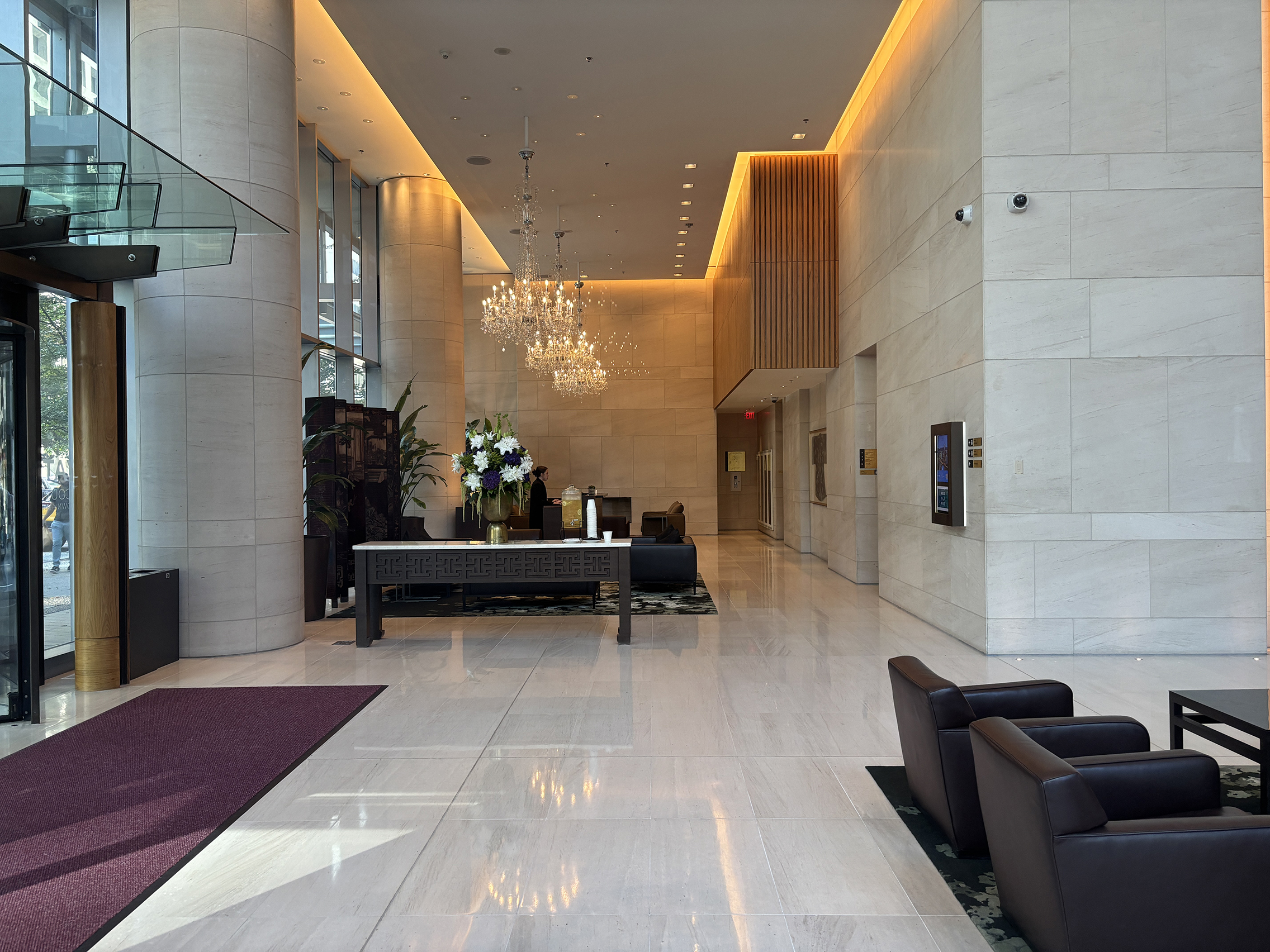
Hyatt Vancouver Downtown Alberni lobby

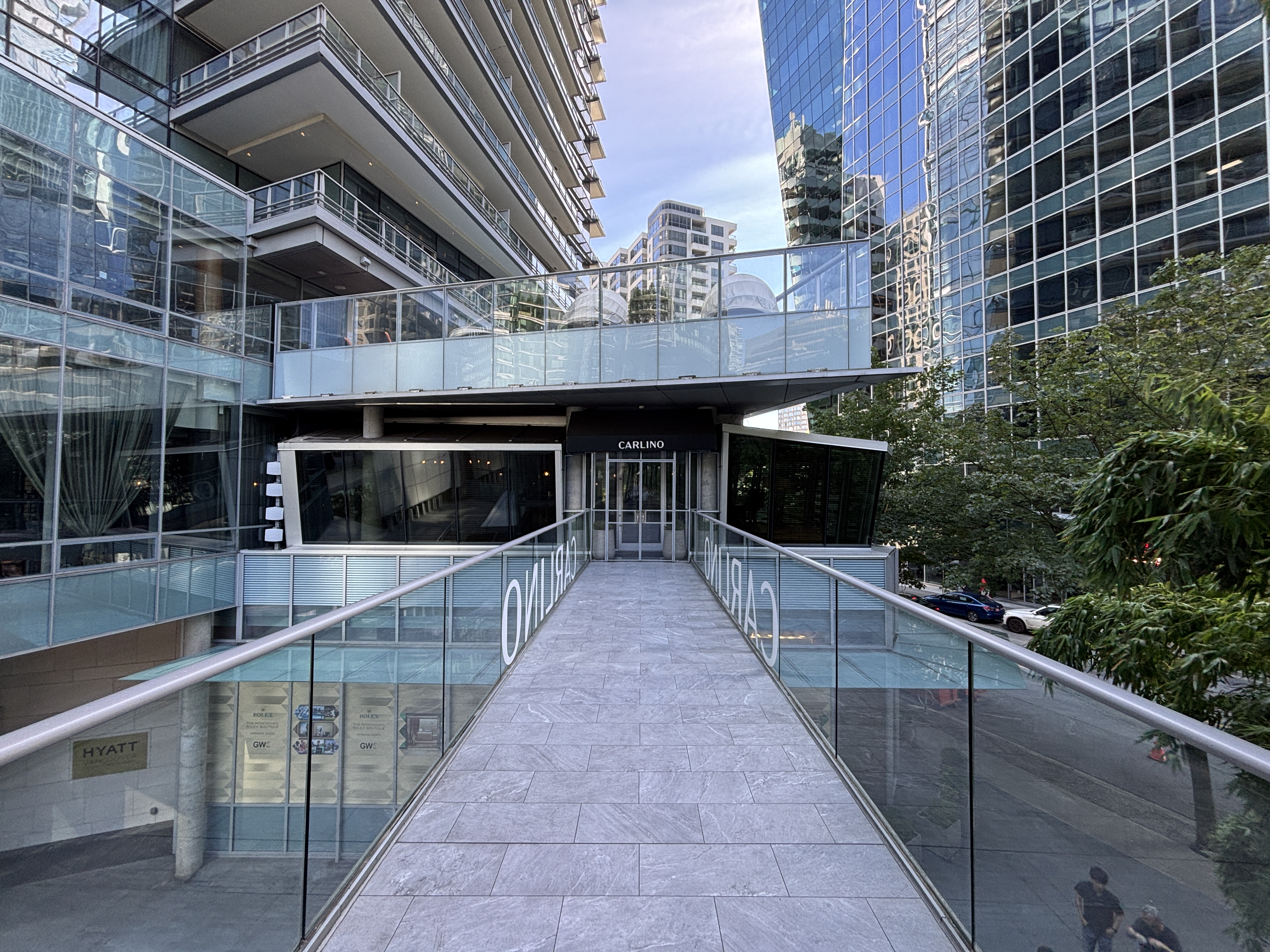
Bridge

== See also ==
- List of tallest buildings in Vancouver
- List of tallest buildings in British Columbia
