= MacMillan Bloedel Building =

Coordinates: 49.285814°N 123.122269°W

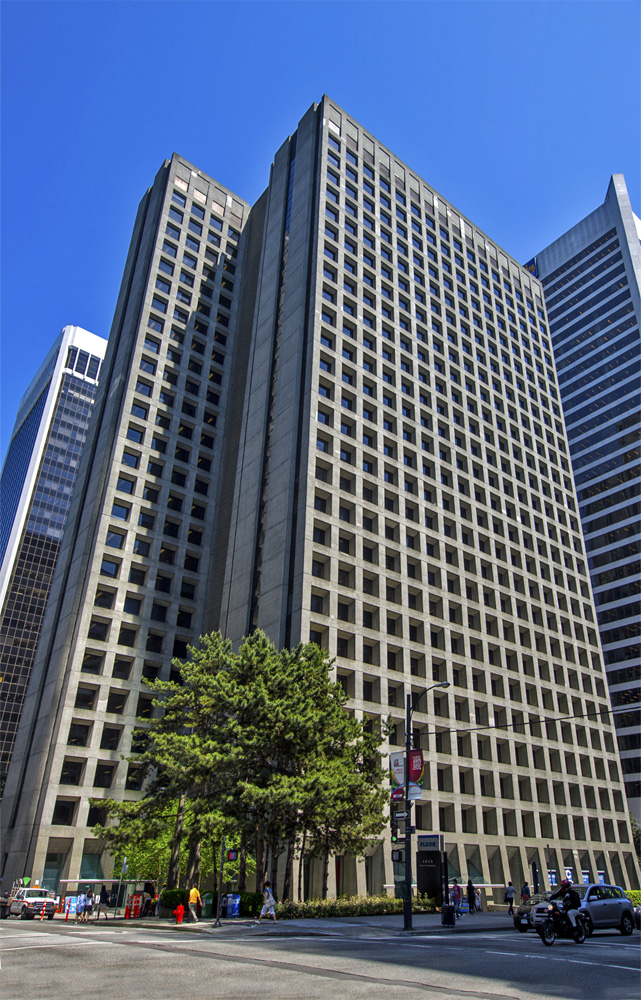

General information
- Location: 1075 W Georgia Street, Vancouver, British Columbia
- Groundbreaking: October 1966
- Opened: 8 December 1968

Technical details
- Floor count: 27

Design and construction
- Architect: Arthur Erickson
- Architecture firm: Erickson Massey Architects; Francis Donaldson

Website
- arthurericksonplace.com

The MacMillan Bloedel Building is a 27-storey office tower in Vancouver, British Columbia. The building was constructed as the head office of the forestry company MacMillan Bloedel and was designed by Erickson/Massey Architects. The partner-in-charge of design was Arthur Erickson, who conceived the building in 1965. Construction began in October 1966 and the building opened officially on 13 December 1968. The building is one of the earliest works in Erickson's catalogue and is one of Canada's outstanding examples of brutalist architecture. In 2021 the owners renamed the building Arthur Erickson Place, however, the original name remains in common use.

== History and design ==
The origins of the MacMillan Bloedel Building lie in the 1951 merger of Bloedel Stewart and Welch with the H. R. MacMillan Export Company to form MacMillan and Bloedel Limited. In 1956, MacMillan and Bloedel commissioned Dominion Construction to design and build a new head office building. Dominion tasked its chief engineer, John McLaren, to plan the structure. The nine-storey MacMillan and Bloedel Building at 1199 W Pender Street was completed in 1957. In December 1959, MacMillan and Bloedel merged with the Power River Company to create MacMillan, Bloedel and Powell River Limited. After the merger, some staff from the Powell River Company moved into the MacMillan and Bloedel Building, while others were forced to use overflow space rented elsewhere. It soon became apparent the merged company required a new, larger head office. MB&PR commissioned several architects to draw proposals, but were unsatisfied with the results. In 1965, company chairman John Clyne approached Erickson/Massey Architects, who had risen to prominence in 1963 when they won the design competition for the new Simon Fraser University campus. Initially Clyne asked the architects to revise the design proposals the company had already received. Erickson/Massey turned down the request but asked if the company would grant them a month to come up with a new design. Clyne accepted their offer and Erickson devised the new concrete structure.

The partner-in-charge of design from Erickson/Massey was Arthur Erickson, while the project architect was James Strasman. Procter Lemare from Francis Donaldson was the project architect. The structural engineer was Otto Safir (who had previously worked on the BC Electric Building) and mechanical engineers were Reid Crowther and Partners. The contractor was Laing Construction.

At the MB&PR annual meeting in May 1966, the company had elected to shorten its name to MacMillan Bloedel Limited. Thus, the building would be called the MacMillan Bloedel Building. Construction began in October 1966. Erickson's design consists of two parallel off-set towers connected by a mechanical core. The front tower is 16 bays long, and the rear tower is 14 bays long. The building has load-bearing concrete exterior walls that create a column-free floor plate. Walls taper in thickness from ten feet at the base to one foot at the top. The flared, tapering walls make it similar to the Monadnock Building in Chicago, an earlier example of a skyscraper with load-bearing walls. Steel I-beams span the full 42-foot width of each tower. The 7' by 7' windows are set into the concrete wall and are single panes of glass. Erickson described the effect as "glass jammed into concrete directly to bring out the extreme contradiction of character of each. All detail was avoided in achieving an uncompromising junction between glass and concrete–void and solid." The spaces between the windows are three feet, thus creating a ten-foot horizontal module. Air conditioning ducts cross the building length-wise, and together with the width-wise structural beams form coffered ceilings. The architects designed the lobby and the company interiors. The elevator hall features a tapestry by Mariette Rousseau-Vermette. On the floors occupied by MacMillan Bloedel, Erickson devised a built-in cupboard system, made of oak or walnut, that acted as the hallway partition for outside offices. Strasman also designed the psychedelic main floor sales office for International Travel, which was of green, blue, yellow, and brown, with lights and mirrors. Together, the lighting and colours produced "the effect on the visitor of being inside a kaleidoscope."

Erickson characterised his work as "a Doric building in its starkness and simplicity." During construction, the architect directed the contractors not to use corner chamfers, to give the concrete sharp edges. While the contractors told him the unfinished edges would chip away, Erickson wanted this roughness to contrast with neat rows of windows.

The building has had extensive interior renovations as recently as 2023, including environmental upgrades that allowed the building to achieve LEED Platinum certification in 2019.

== Evaluations ==
In 1970, the MacMillan Bloedel Building won the Massey Medal for Architecture.

Erickson's biographer, David Stouck, wrote that "the building has been both admired and scorned by Vancouver's citizenry. It gives variety and character to a monotonous urban landscape, but on rainy days this concrete monolith with its rows of windows seems to many to draw into itself the greyness of the northwest climate. For some, it remains a remarkable building; to others, it is too stark, a cold piece of brutalist modern architecture." Ricardo L. Castro and David Theodore said, "this redoubtable office building sits like a pair of giant interlaced trees in Vancouver's downtown, its tapering forms somehow managing to represent and evoke MacMillan Bloedel's involvement in the rude and wild forestry industry. The sunken entrance courtyard adds to the sense of an urban forest setting, creating a topographical site for the towers."

Although critics have likened the tapering wall thickness to the structure of a tree, the symbolism was unintentional. Erickson wrote, "the fact that the building is rather rugged in appearance and that it tapers upward like the trunk of a great tree is quite incidental, but nevertheless conforms to the image that MacMillan Bloedel wanted to project."

== Popular culture ==
In episode 5.11 of the television series Alias, the MacMillan Bloedel Building is the home of the fictional Queens Bank.

== Drawings ==
Drawings for the MacMillan Bloedel Building are held at the Canadian Architectural Archives at the University of Calgary in the Arthur Erickson fonds. Drawings are also held at the Canadian Centre for Architecture in Montreal in the Arthur Erickson fonds.

== See also ==
- List of Brutalist structures
