= Metrotown =

Metrotown may refer to:

- Metrotown, Burnaby, a town centre in Burnaby, British Columbia, Canada
  - Metropolis at Metrotown, a shopping mall in Burnaby, British Columbia, Canada, often referred to as Metrotown
  - Metrotown station, a SkyTrain station serving the above town centre

== See also ==
- Metro Town, a high-rise development in Hong Kong
