= Shin Ming Estate =

Public housing estate in Tseung Kwan O, Hong Kong

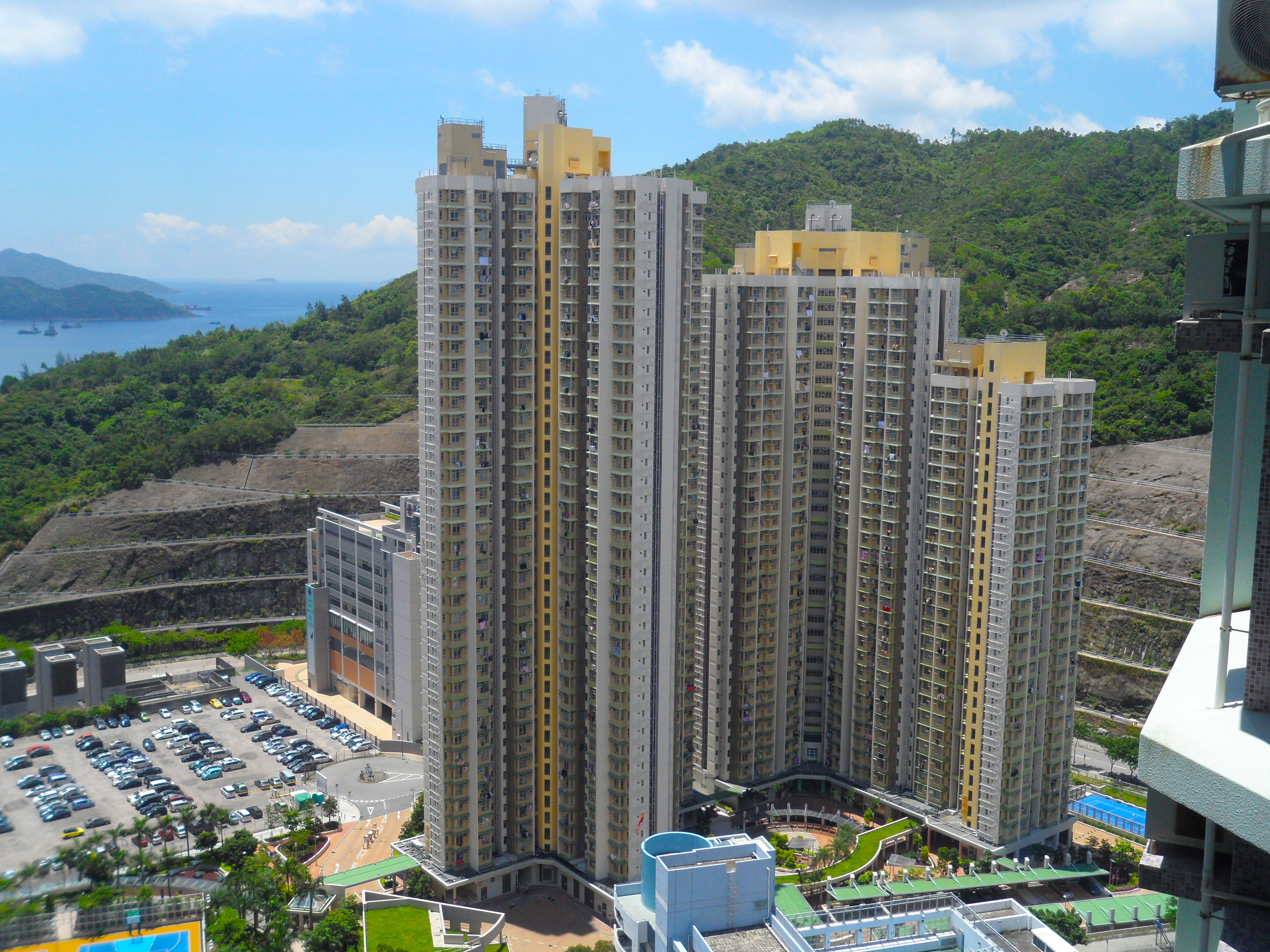
- Shin Ming Estate
- Interactive map of Shin Ming Estate

General information
- Location: 2 Choi Ming Street, Tiu Keng Leng; Tseung Kwan O New Territories, Hong Kong
- Coordinates: 22.30361°N 114.24994°E
- Status: Completed
- Category: Public rental housing
- Population: 4,002 (2016)
- No. of blocks: 2
- No. of units: 2,000

Construction
- Constructed: 2011; 15 years ago
- Authority: Hong Kong Housing Authority

Shin Ming Estate (Chinese: 善明邨) is a public housing estate in Tiu Keng Leng, Tseung Kwan O, New Territories, Hong Kong, near Metro Town and MTR Tiu Keng Leng station. It consists of two housing blocks housing 2,000 flats completed in 2011.

== Houses ==
Name	Chinese name	Building type	Completed
Shin Chi House	善智樓	Non-standard block (Cross-shaped)	2011
Shin Lai House	善禮樓	Non-standard block (Cross-shaped) with Annex Block	2011

== Demographics ==
According to the 2016 by-census, Shin Ming Estate had a population of 4,002. The median age was 46.8 and the majority of residents (99.5 per cent) were of Chinese ethnicity. The average household size was 2.1 people. The median monthly household income of all households (i.e. including both economically active and inactive households) was HK$13,250.

== Politics ==
Shin Ming Estate is located in Do Shin constituency of the Sai Kung District Council. It is currently represented by Cheung Chin-pang, who was elected in the 2019 elections.

== See also ==
- Public housing estates in Tseung Kwan O
