= Crystal Mall (British Columbia) =

Shopping mall in Burnaby, British Columbia

- Coordinates: 49.229187°N 123.004646°W
- Address: 4500 Kingsway, Burnaby, British Columbia, Canada
- Opened: 2000
- Num. of stores: 250
- Floors: 2
- Parking: 950
- Public transit: Metrotown
- Website: crystalmall.ca

Crystal Mall
- Traditional Chinese: 麗晶廣場
- Simplified Chinese: 丽晶广场
Transcriptions
Standard Mandarin
- Hanyu Pinyin: Lì Jīng Guǎngchǎng
Yue: Cantonese
- Jyutping: Lai^{6} Zing^{1} Gwong^{2}coeng^{4}

The Crystal Mall (Chinese: 麗晶廣場) is a shopping mall oriented towards the local Chinese community in Burnaby, British Columbia, Canada. It is located at 4500 Kingsway at the intersection with Willingdon Avenue in Metrotown, directly adjoined to the Hilton Metrotown Vancouver Hotel. A 26 floor residential tower called Residence at the Crystal was also constructed that connects to the rest of the shopping complex.

It is also across from the Metropolis at Metrotown shopping centre and the Bob Prittie Metrotown Burnaby Public Library branch.

== Mall ==
The Crystal Mall was established in the year 2000. The mall also has a traditional Chinese open market and has 950 parking stalls in its 4-level underground parking, although a small section is reserved for hotel customers only. The mall itself was constructed in a circular design which comprises two levels of shops and a Chinese open market on the first level, while the second level consist of more shops as well as a food court catering mainly to East Asian cuisines. The outer side of the main level consist of further stores and multiple restaurants. Also of note is within a section of a hallway on the first level consists of a 'Computer Lane' which sells computer and electronic parts.

== Gallery ==
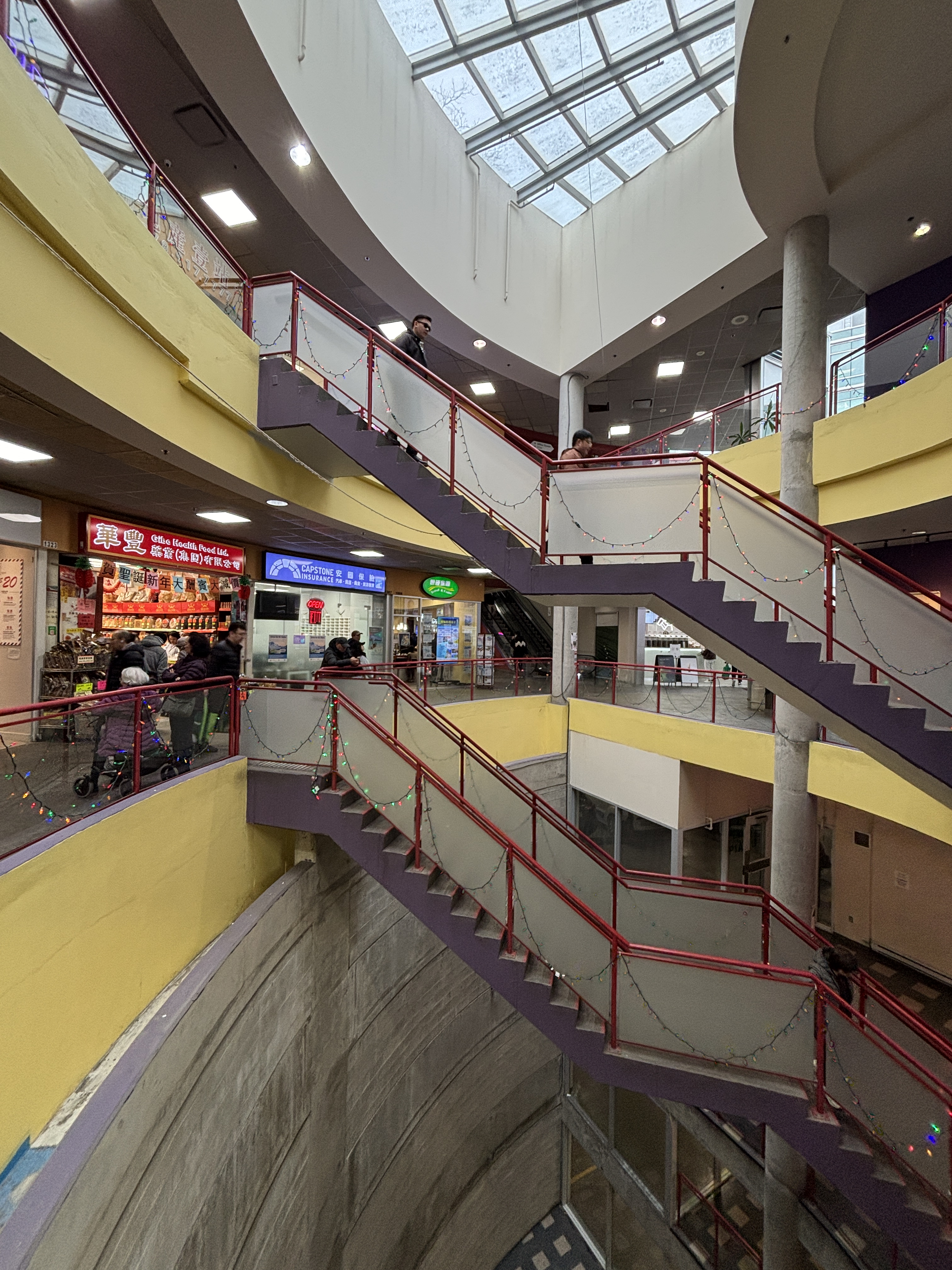
Atrium

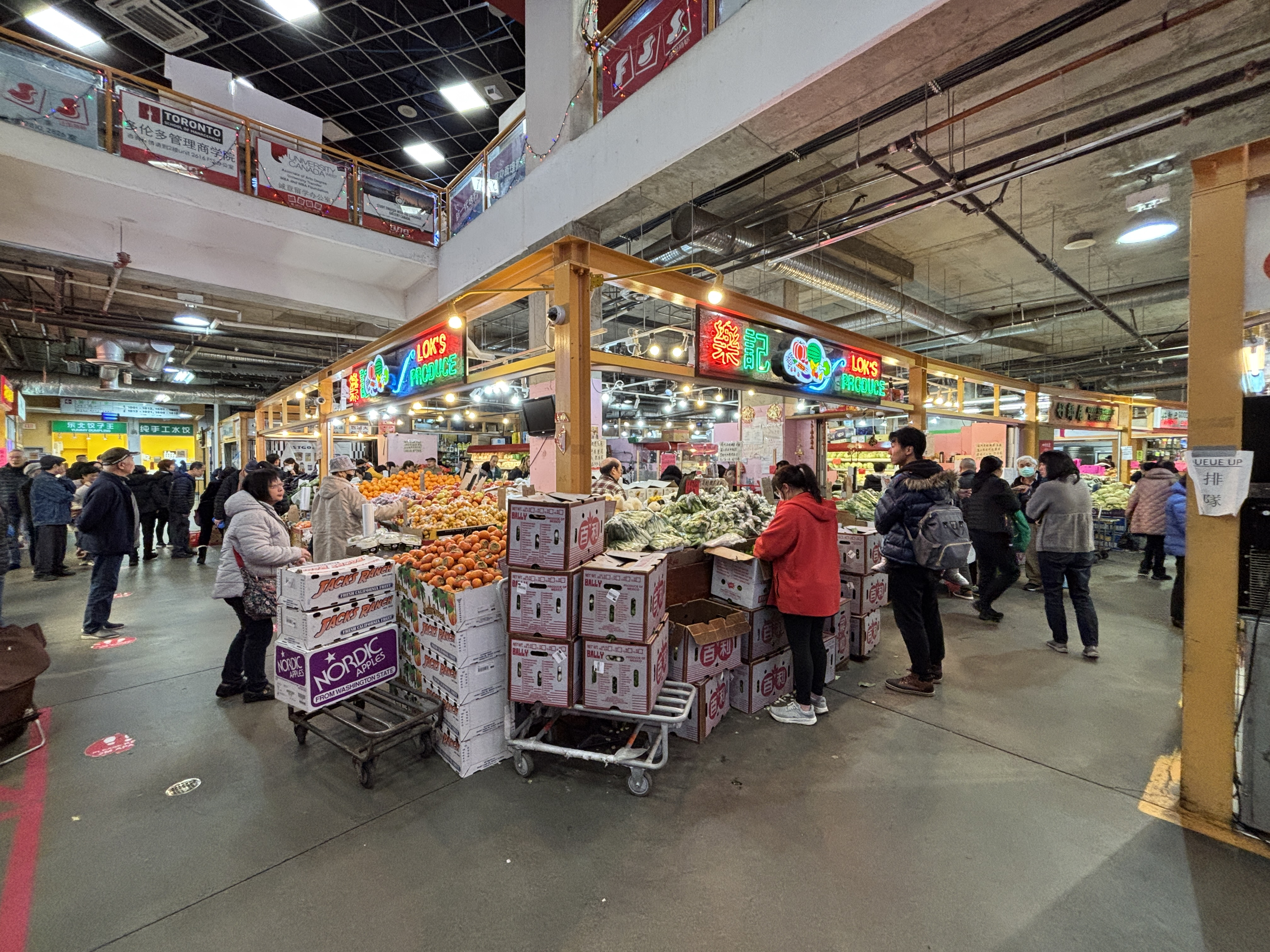
Main floor has traditional Chinese open market

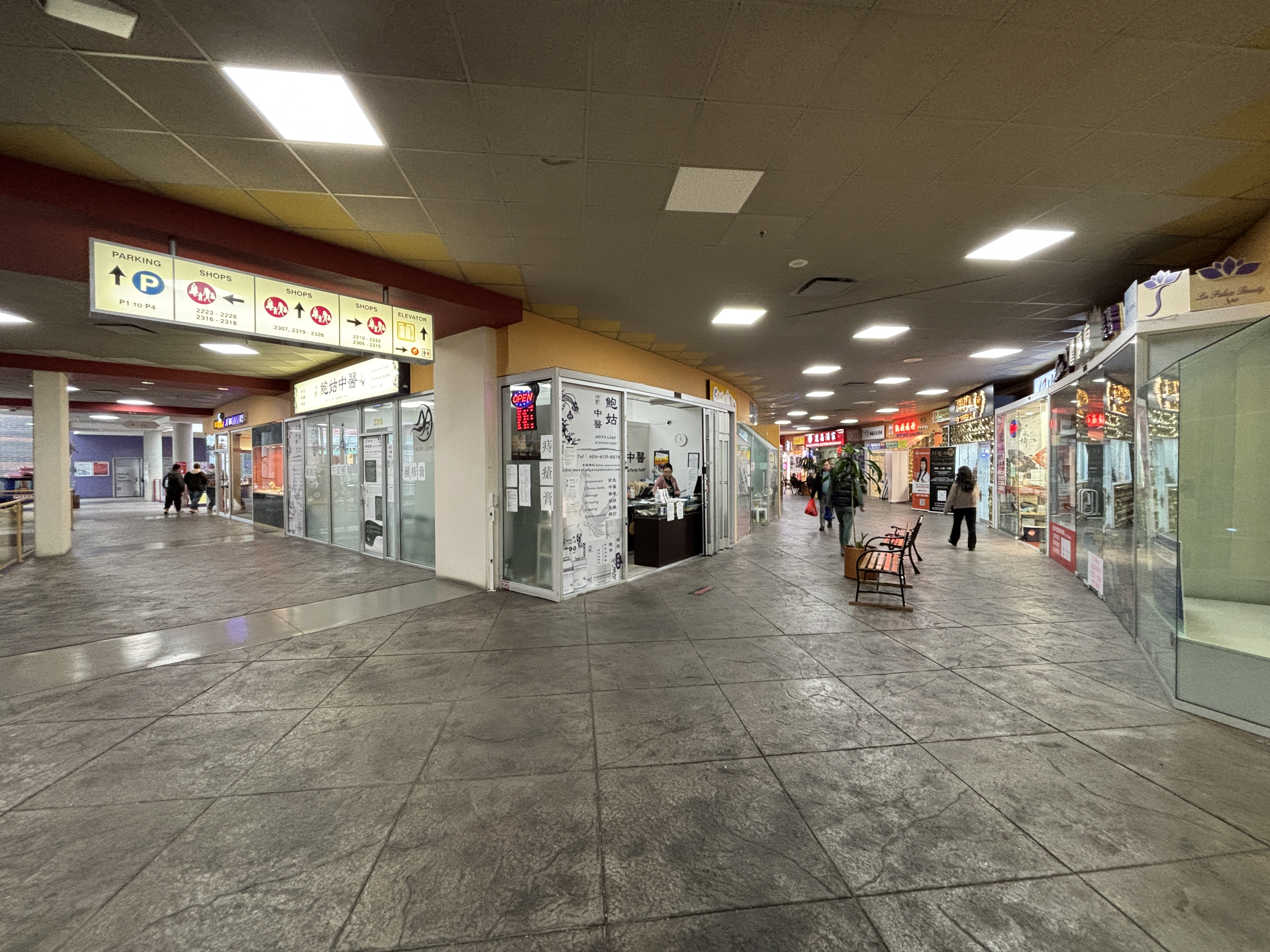
Level 2 Shops

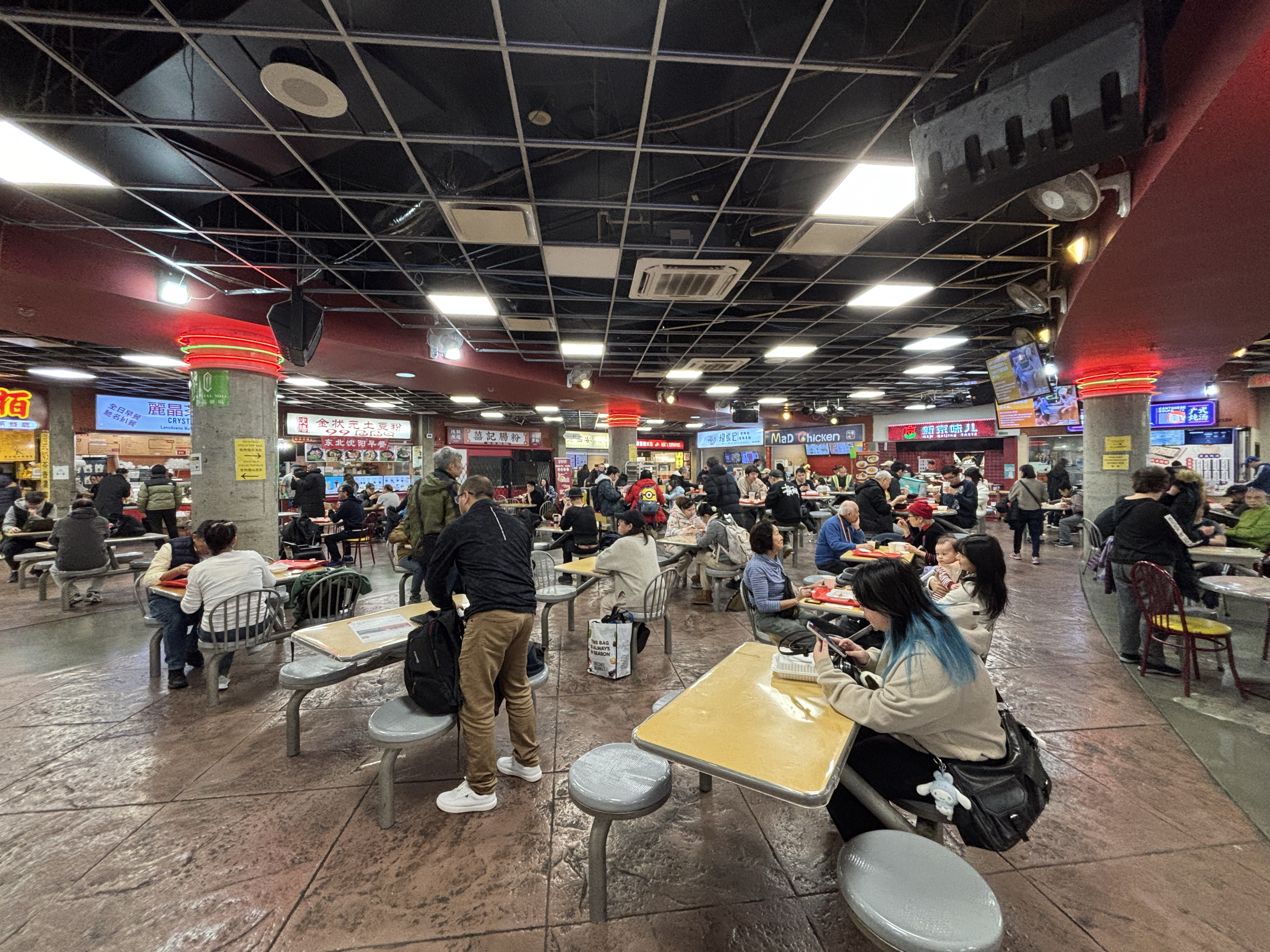
Food court in Level 2

== See also ==
- Chinese Canadians in British Columbia
