= Metropolis at Metrotown =

Shopping mall in Burnaby, Canada

Coordinates: 49.226496°N 122.999904°W

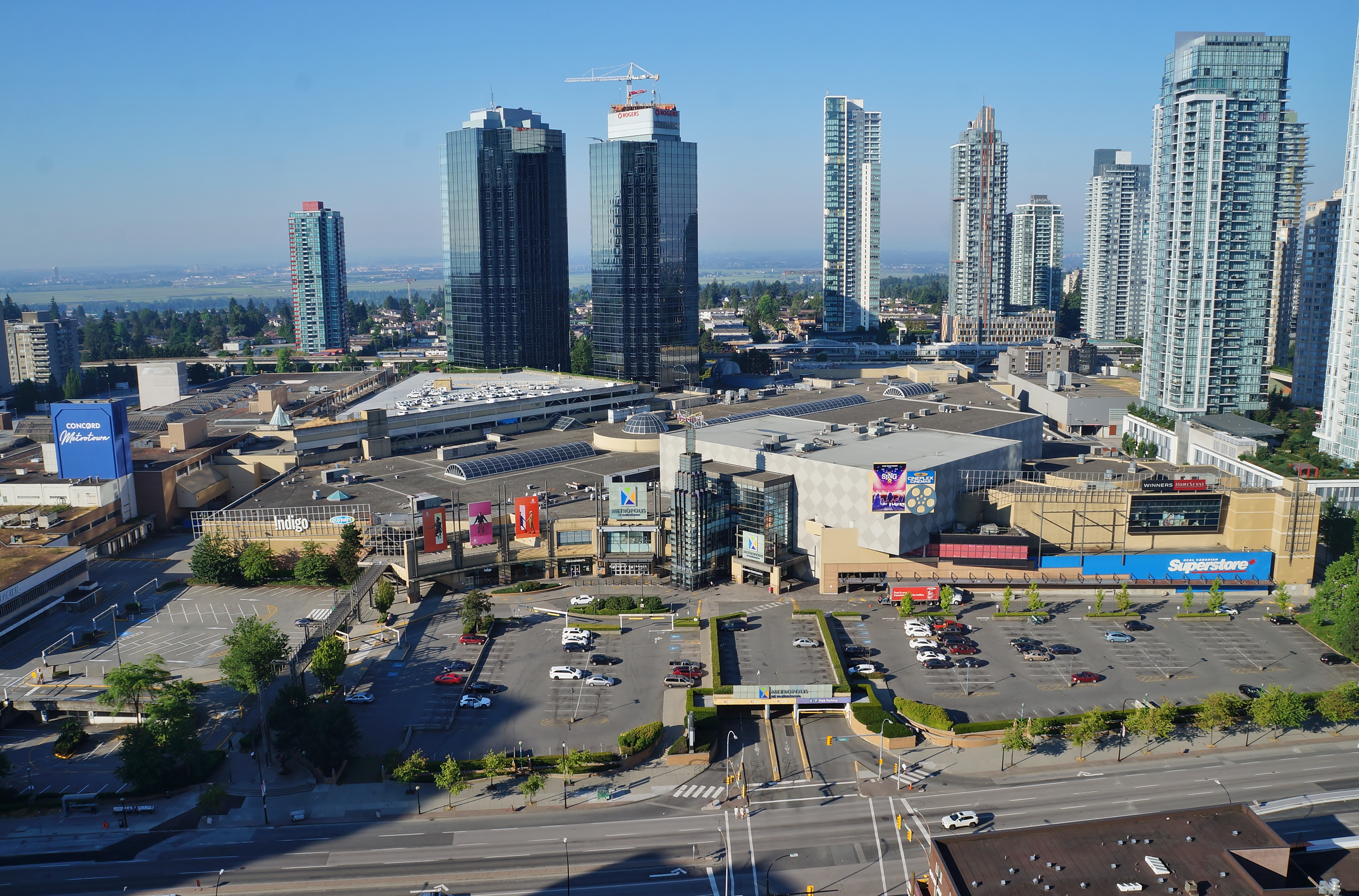
- Aerial view of the mall from the north
- Location: 4700 Kingsway; Burnaby, British Columbia, Canada
- Opened: September 25, 1986; 40 years ago
- Developer: Cal Investments
- Manager: Ivanhoé Cambridge
- Owner: Ivanhoé Cambridge
- Num. of stores: 450
- Num. of anchor tenants: 14 (12 open, 2 vacant)
- Floor area: 165,646.6 m^{2} (1,783,005 sq ft)
- Floors: 3
- Parking: 8,500
- Public transit: Metrotown station; Bus
- Website: www.metropolisatmetrotown.com

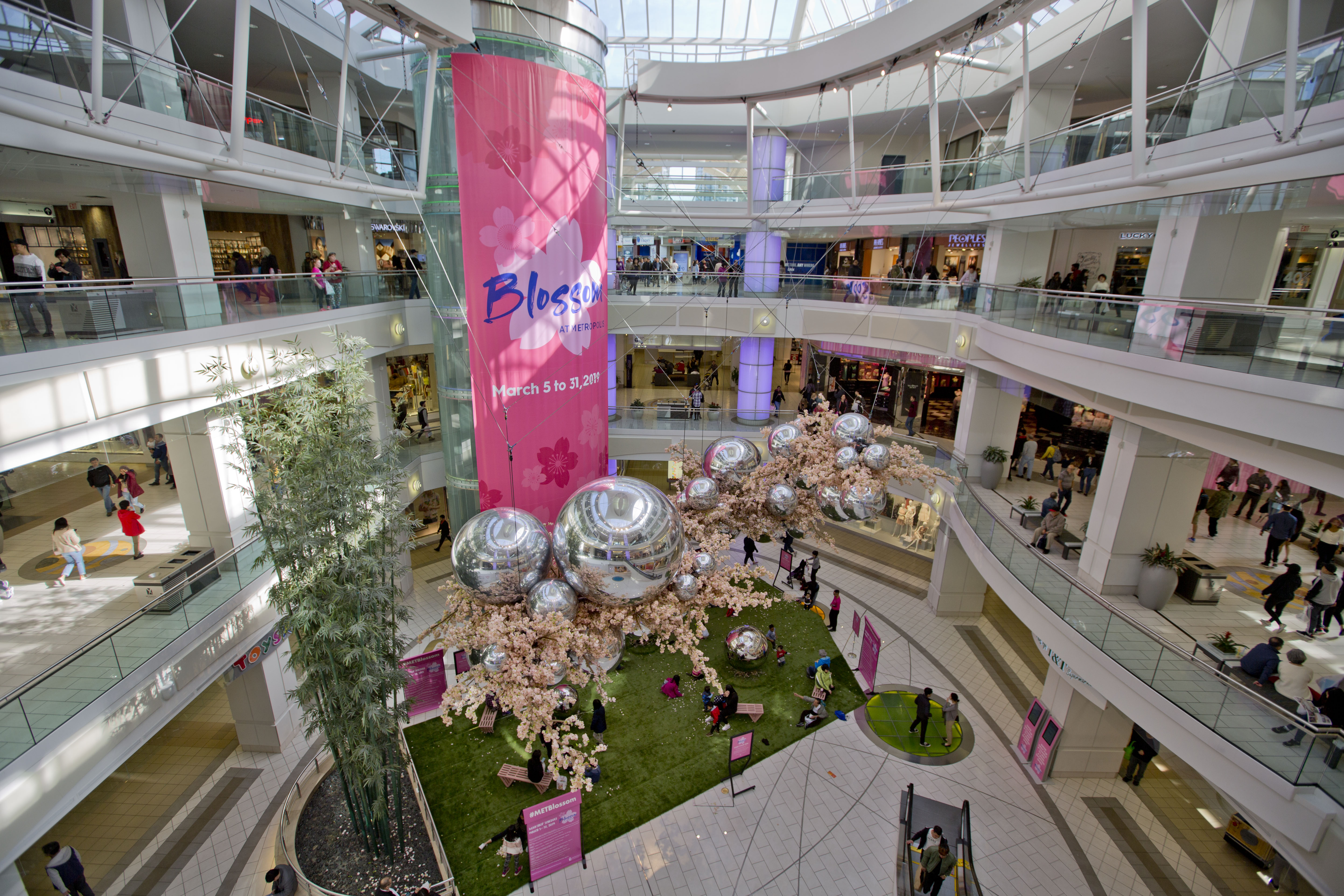
Mall atrium

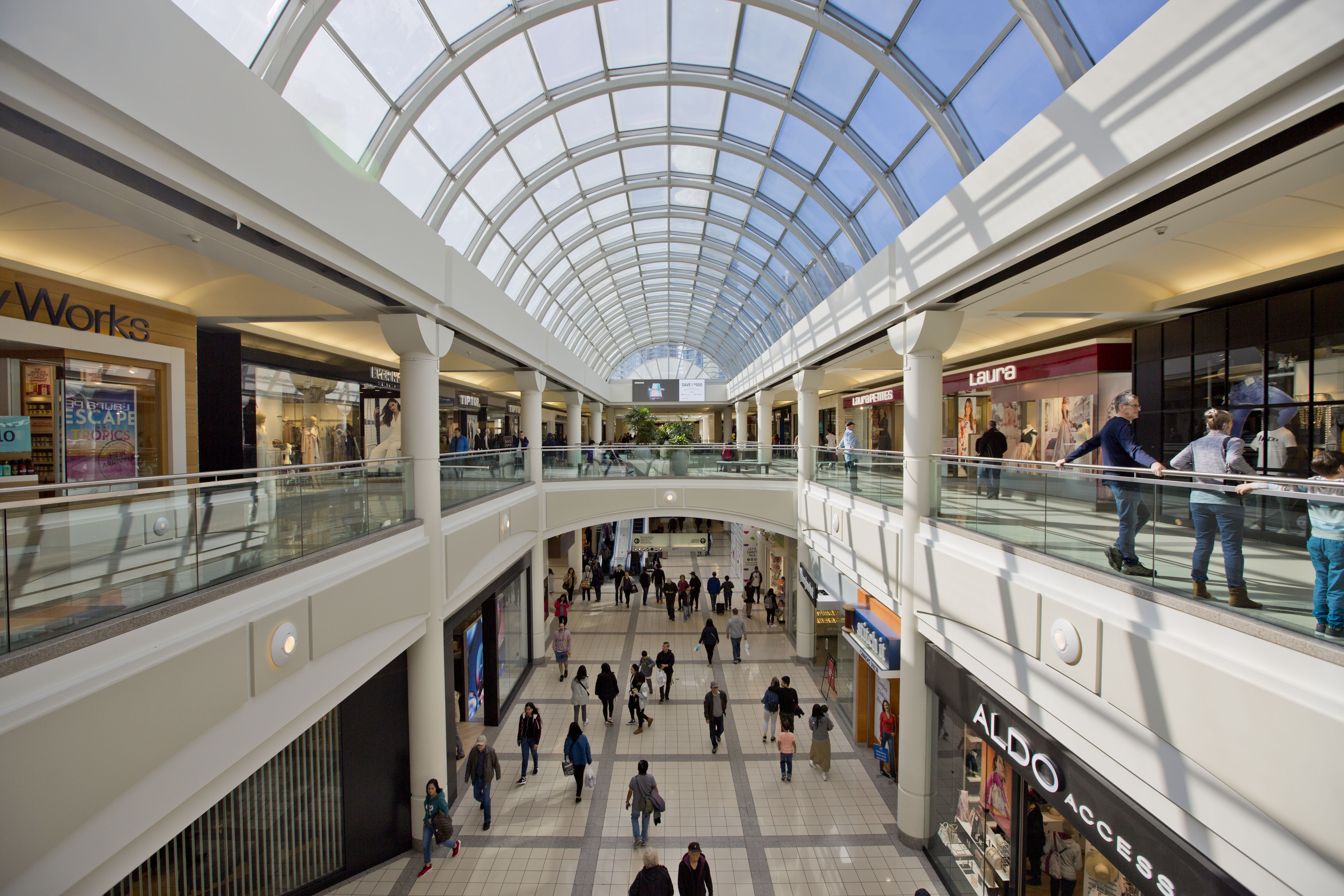
Skylight of the mall

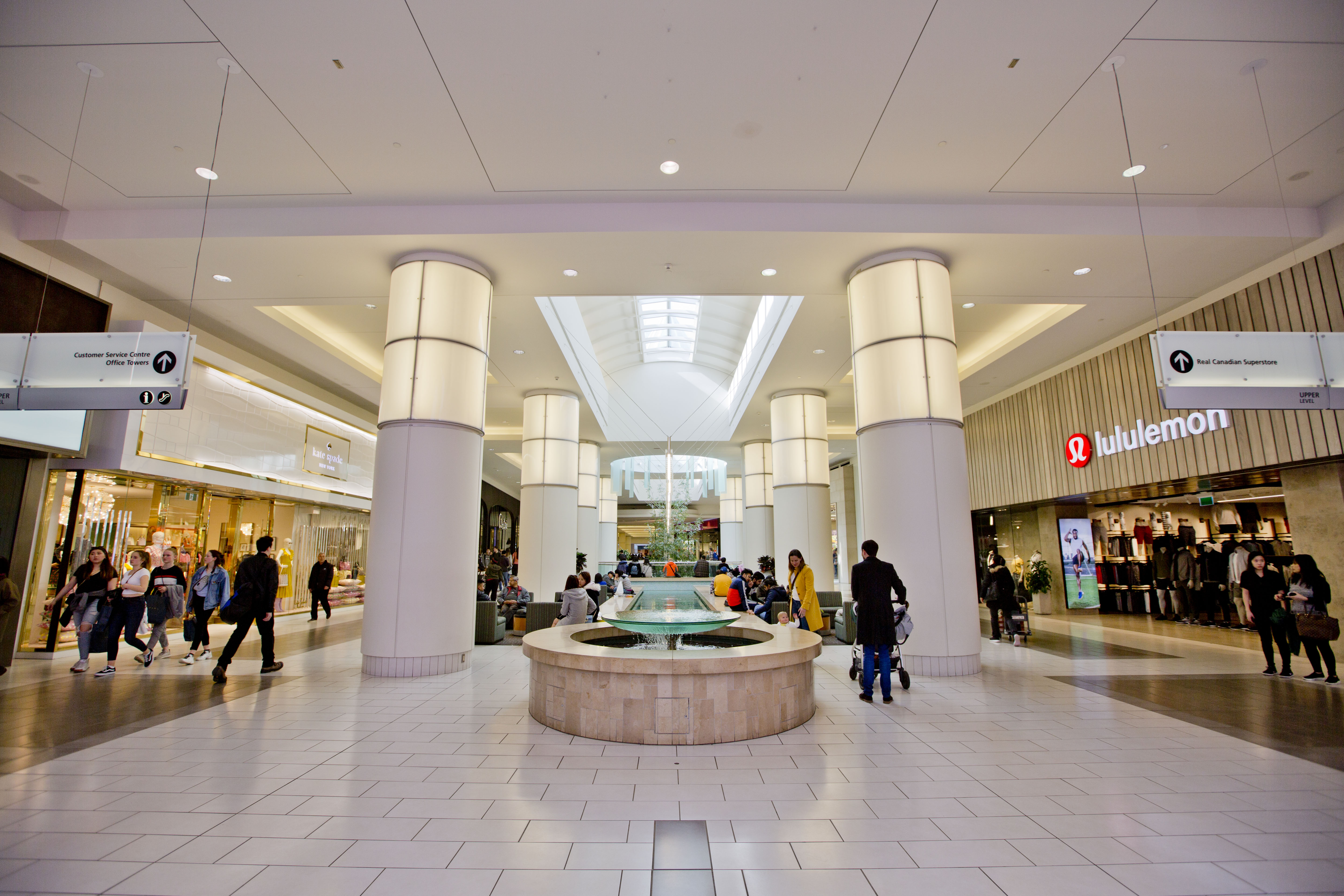
Fountain inside the mall

Metropolis at Metrotown (commonly referred to as Metrotown) is a three-storey shopping mall complex in the Metrotown area of Burnaby, British Columbia, Canada. Opened in 1986, it is the largest mall in British Columbia and the third-largest in Canada, behind Alberta's West Edmonton Mall and Ontario's Square One Shopping Centre, with 27 million customer visits annually. The mall is located adjacent to Metrotown station on the SkyTrain rapid transit system. Three office buildings are part of the complex along Central Boulevard.

== History ==
Metrotown Centre opened in 1986 – attached to a new Woodward's department store, and a Sears Canada department store that had been operating there since the early 1950s – on land that had held a Ford Canada motor factory, warehouses, other light industry, and a supermarket, and which was adjacent to the former Vancouver Interurban Rail line (now the route for the SkyTrain). The mall has been expanded and renovated several times, and has contributed to the rapid growth of the area's population. A new Hudson's Bay store and an expansion wing was added in 1992.

Two additional shopping centres were constructed adjacent to the original Metrotown – Eaton Centre and Station Square. These three different malls were connected by pedestrian overpasses, as were the two office towers known as the Metrotowers. In 1998, Eaton Centre added Metropolis, a collection of stores aimed towards younger shoppers, including the SilverCity movie theatre which opened in 1998, and Rainforest Cafe which opened in June 1998 (but was permanently closed in October 2001). The name Metropolis came to apply to Eaton Centre once its main tenant, Eaton's department store, shut down in 1999. In 2005, a major expansion project combined Metrotown and Metropolis into a megamall, and added many new stores and Western Canada's largest food court. Following this expansion, the two malls became one entity under the name "Metropolis at Metrotown". Station Square was not included in this merger, and as of 2013, it was demolished to make way for a new high-rise complex to be named after Station Square that was completed in August 2022.

Construction on Metrotower III, located immediately south of the other two office towers, began in mid-2008, was subsequently put on hold, and was completed in April 2014. This completed the original plan for the Metrotower complex.

In January 2018, Sears Canada closed as the company went out of business.

In October 2024, Toys "R" Us closed to make way for the towers.

== Surrounding neighbourhood ==
The Metrotown neighbourhood is home to a number of smaller shopping centres. The pedestrian overpass originally connecting Station Square to the SkyTrain station was closed in November 2016 and later demolished. Pedestrians needing to get to and from the SkyTrain station and the shopping center are now required to use the street access. The Asian-themed Crystal Mall opened near Metropolis in 2000, but has no direct connection. Old Orchard Centre is another shopping centre located nearby that is considered part of the Metrotown district. It is a strip plaza that predates the other shopping centres in the neighbourhood.

== Stores ==
The complex consists of over 450 shops and services; the anchors are Cineplex Cinemas, H&M, Indigo Books and Music, Muji, Old Navy, Real Canadian Superstore, Sport Chek, T & T Supermarket, Uniqlo, Urban Behavior, Walmart, Winners/HomeSense, Zara and Aritzia.

== Transportation ==
Immediately below the Central Boulevard entrance and covered walkway is a bus loop and exchange, which is a major hub for services coming in from other parts of Burnaby as well as Vancouver, Richmond, and New Westminster. The mall is also served by Metrotown station on the Expo Line of the SkyTrain network.

== Future ==
In October 2019, Burnaby city council approved a long-term master plan that will eventually replace the mall with a downtown neighborhood with new high rises, retail space, streets, and pedestrian plazas.

== See also ==
- Eaton Centre
- Ivanhoé Cambridge
- List of shopping malls in Canada
