= Metrotown station =

Metro Vancouver SkyTrain station

Metrotown
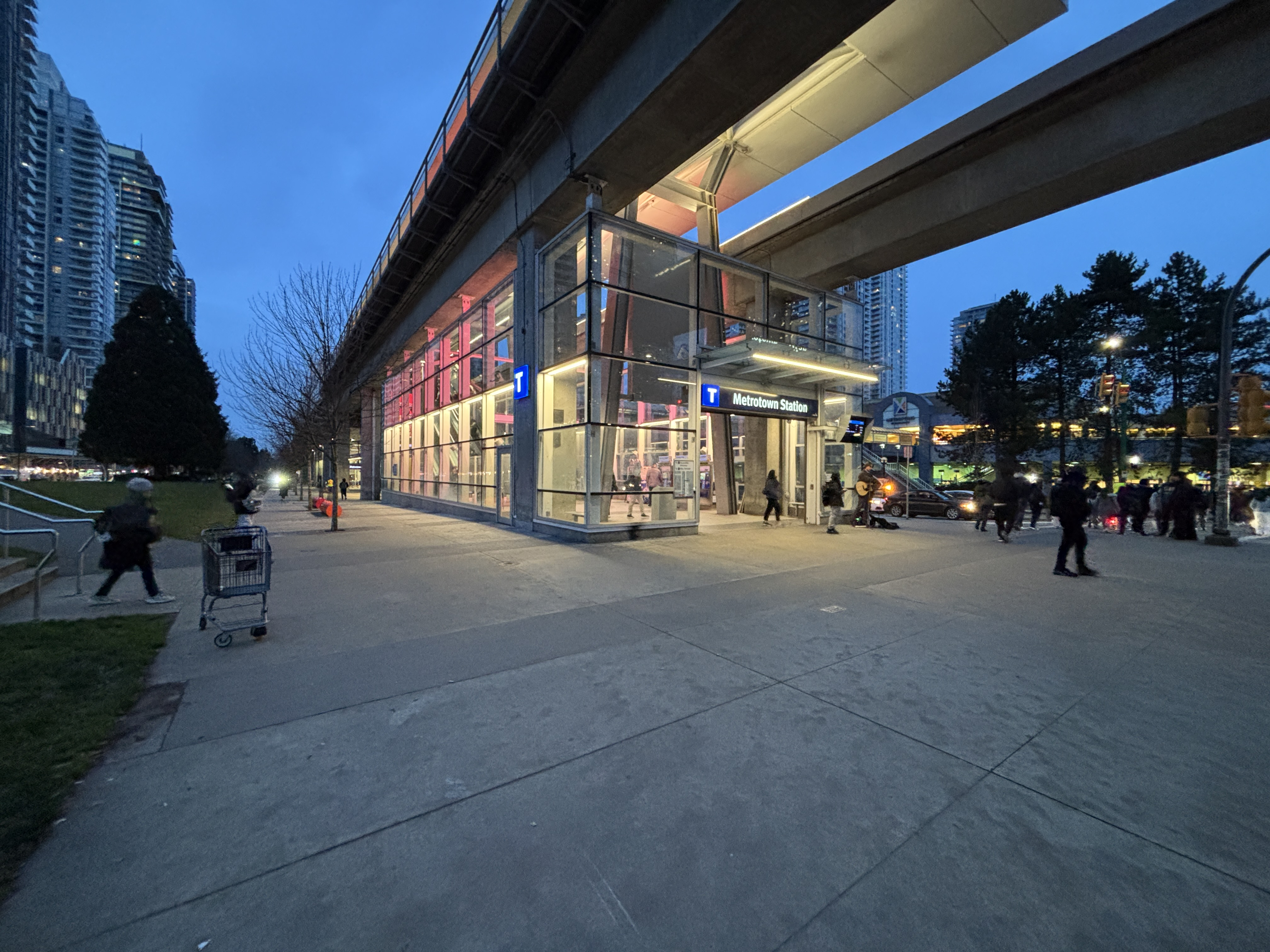
- Entrance to station entrance

General information
- Location: 4401 Beresford Street, Burnaby
- Coordinates: 49.225463°N 123.003182°W
- System: SkyTrain station
- Owner: TransLink
- Platforms: Centre platform
- Tracks: 2
- Connections: R2 Marine–Willingdon

Construction
- Structure type: Elevated
- Accessible: Yes

Other information
- Station code: MT
- Fare zone: 2

History
- Opened: December 11, 1985; 40 years ago
- Rebuilt: 2015–2018; 8 years ago

Passengers
- 2025: 8,228,000 ▼3.3%
- Rank: 2 of 54

Services
Preceding station	TransLink	Following station
Patterson towards Waterfront	Expo Line	Royal Oak towards King George or Production Way–University
Location

Metrotown is an elevated station on the Expo Line of Metro Vancouver's SkyTrain rapid transit system, and is located along Central Boulevard, directly across from the Metropolis at Metrotown shopping centre, in Burnaby, British Columbia, Canada. As of 2022, it is the second-busiest station in the SkyTrain system.

== History ==
Metrotown station was built in 1985 as part of the original SkyTrain system, on what is now known as the Expo Line. An overhead walkway, spanning Central Boulevard and the bus loop, to the Eaton Centre shopping centre (now Metropolis at Metrotown) was added to the station in 1989. Originally, the loop was open-air and connected to the station via an at-grade street crossing.

The station was originally designed as a suburban station serving residential neighbourhoods and local transit connections. It experienced a major traffic increase due to the opening of nearby shopping centres and the redevelopment of the neighbourhood, leading to passenger loads and circulation surpassing the design capacity of the original station.

In 2007, TransLink established plans for a major retrofit and redesign of the station to improve passenger flow and increase station capacity. Construction began in February 2015, with an estimated cost of $55.5 million, jointly funded by the federal, provincial and municipal governments.

On November 15, 2016, TransLink closed and partially dismantled the pedestrian overpass in preparation for work required in rebuilding the east stationhouse. The closure led to criticism and extra travel time for many passengers. A new footbridge, to be funded entirely by the City of Burnaby, is included in Burnaby's 2019–2023 Capital Plan, released May 2019. The plan allocates a total of $17.25 million over 4 years towards its construction but does not specify a completion date for the project.

The centre stationhouse opened to the public on March 24, 2017, and features new stairs and elevators. On July 24, 2017, the west stationhouse opened, featuring four escalators.

The rebuilt east stationhouse opened on March 19, 2018, and—like the west stationhouse—it also features four escalators. Upon completion of the third phase, the station has a total of eight escalators, three elevators as well as stairs to and from platform level.

On September 22, 2025, public washrooms were opened at the station, marking the first such facilities to be available at a SkyTrain station.

== Services ==
- Metrotown station is a major connection point for the TransLink bus routes in southern Vancouver and Burnaby.
- The station is right across Central Boulevard from a bus loop and Metropolis at Metrotown and Station Square malls.
- The Crystal Mall and many other retail developments are nearby on Kingsway, one block north of the station.
- The Burnaby Public Library Bob Prittie Metrotown Branch is also one block away from the station in Burnaby Civic Square.
- Burnaby Civic Square, Kinnee, Maywood Park & Bonsor Park are located two blocks away from the station.
- Bonsor Recreation Complex is a community centre located in Bonsor Park.
- An ATM is available on the street level of the station's east entry.

== Station information ==
=== Entrances ===
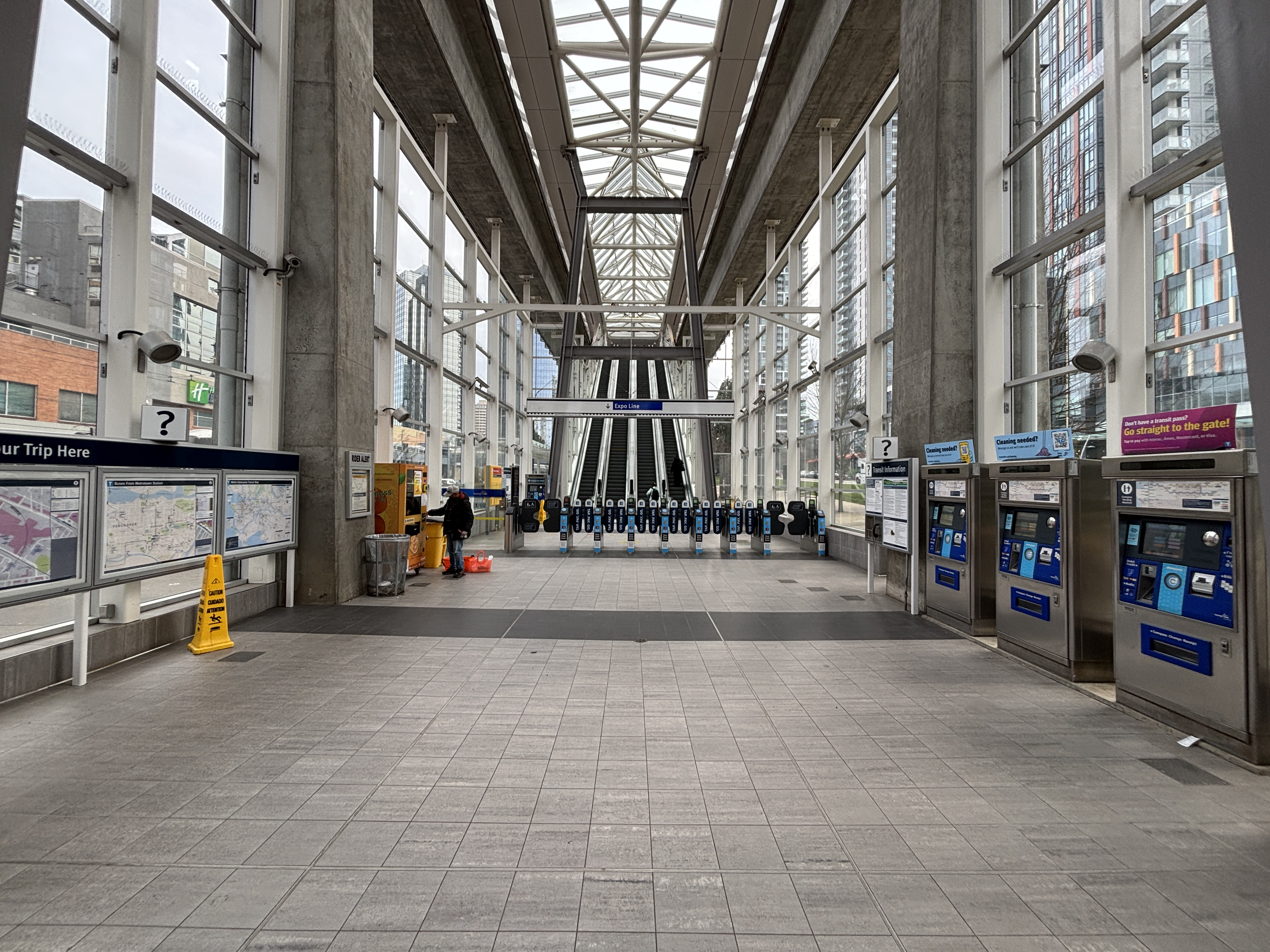
Escalators at the western entrance

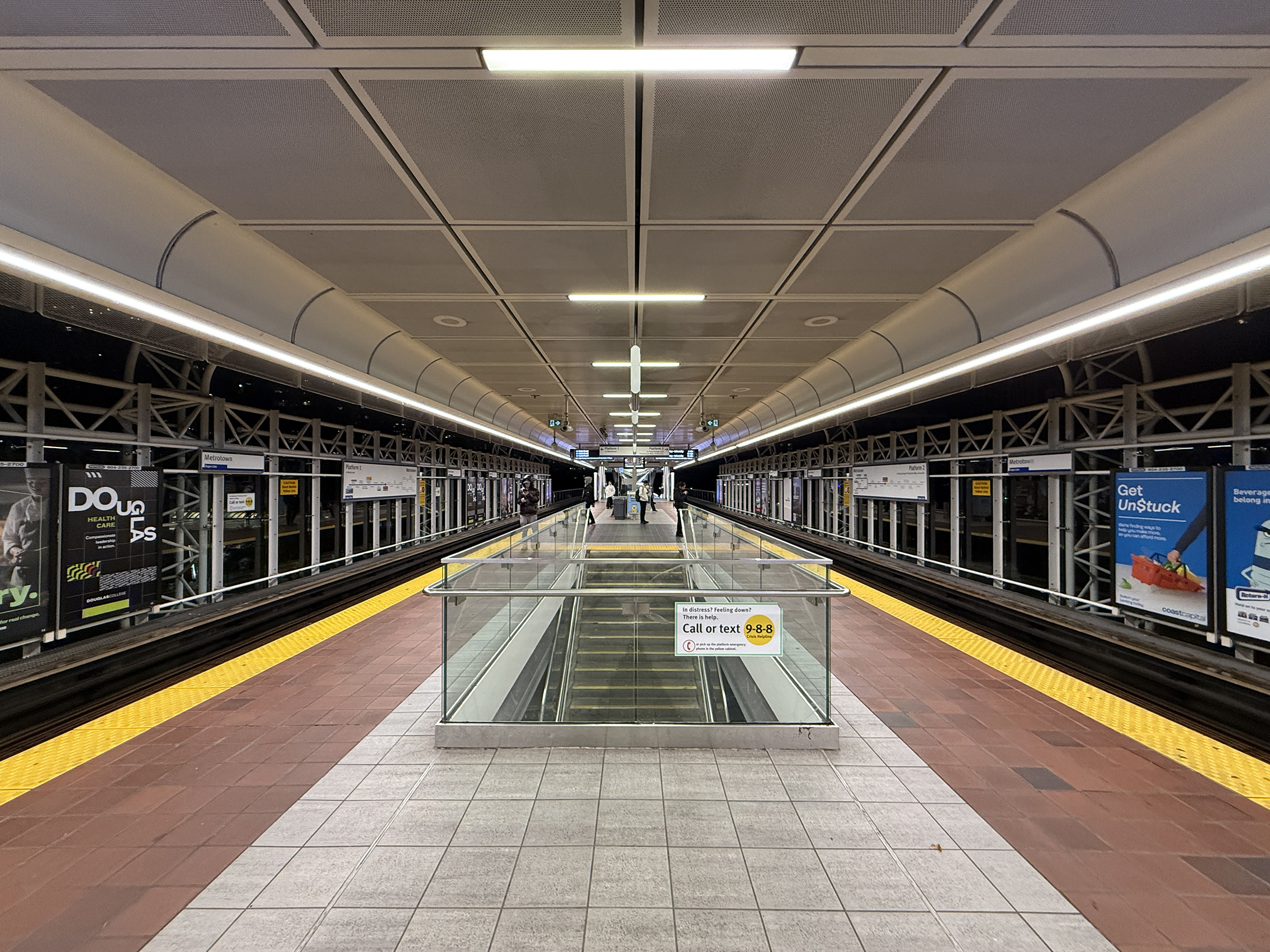
Station platform

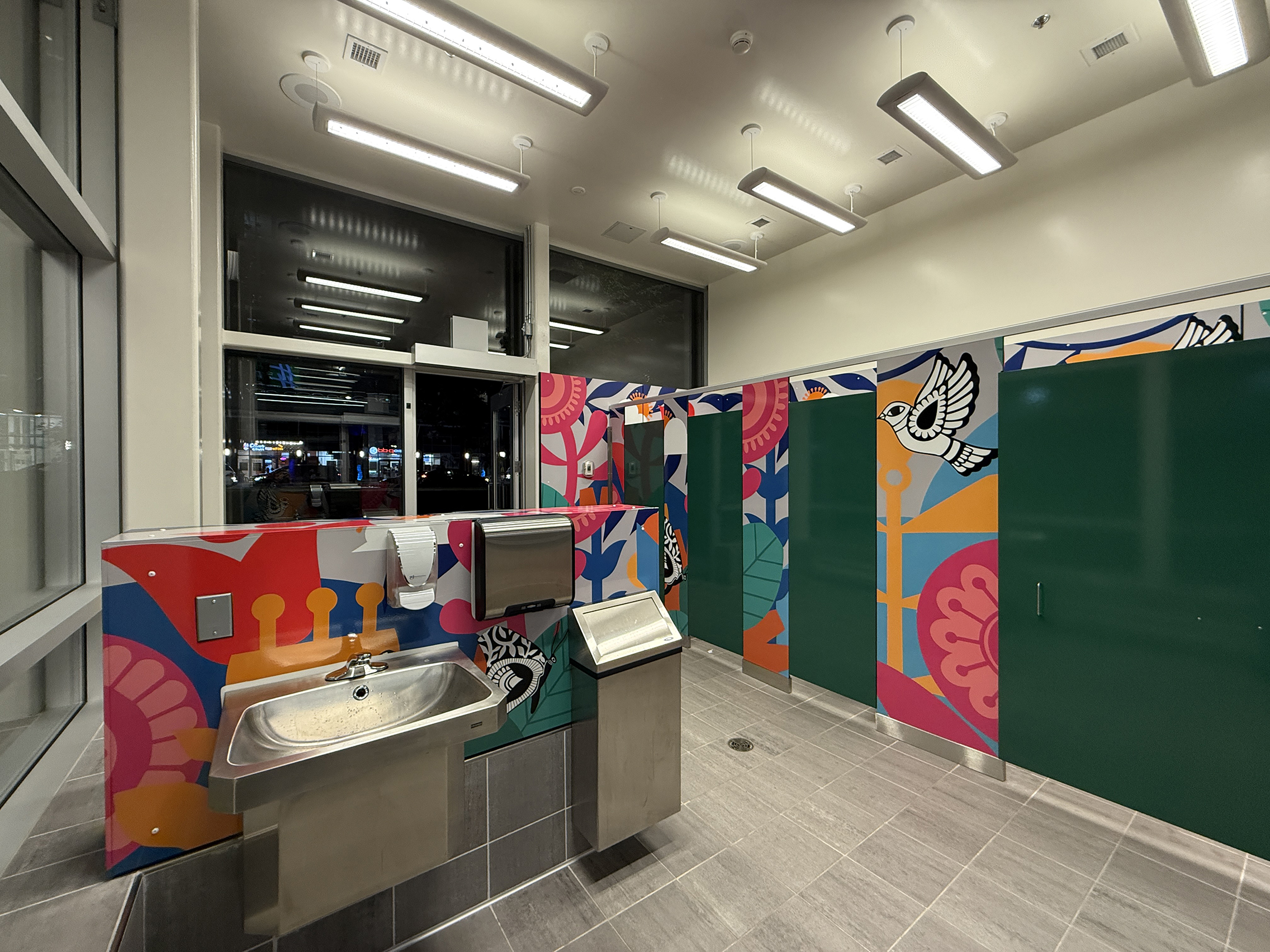
Metrotown station public washrooms opened in October 2025

- East entrance: This entrance is located on the BC Parkway, north of Beresford Street and south of Central Boulevard. It can be found at the far east end of the platform. It has four escalators and opened on March 19, 2018, replacing the original entry which was limited to stair access between street and concourse level. The entrance is in close proximity to Bay 9 of the Metrotown transit exchange for connections to south Burnaby community shuttle services.
- West entrance: This entrance is located on the west side of the station. It has 4 escalators which opened on July 24, 2017, to replace an emergency exit stairway.
- Centre entrance: Construction on this entrance, which includes access to the station via stairs and 3 elevators, began in May 2015 to replace the previous single elevator entrance. It was opened, with two of its three elevators in service, on March 24, 2017.

=== Transit connections ===
Metrotown provides a partial off-street transit exchange on Beresford Street, and in front of the ground-level entrance to Metropolis shopping centre.

As of September 2026, the following routes serve Metrotown station:

Bay	Routes	Additional information
1	—	Unloading only
2	19 Stanley Park	Trolley bus service
3	430 Richmond–Brighouse Station	Express
4	130 Kootenay Loop	
5	144 SFU	
6	119 Edmonds Station	
6	129 Holdom Station	Limited service
7	31 River District	
8	146 Suncrest	
8	147 Edmonds Station	
10	—	Unloading only
11	49 UBC	Articulated bus service
12	116 Edmonds Station	
13	110 Lougheed Station	
14	—	Unloading only
15	R2 Marine–Willingdon to Park Royal	RapidBus service
