= Metro Town =

Housing estate in Tseung Kwan O, Hong Kong

Coordinates: 22.3043°N 114.2519°E

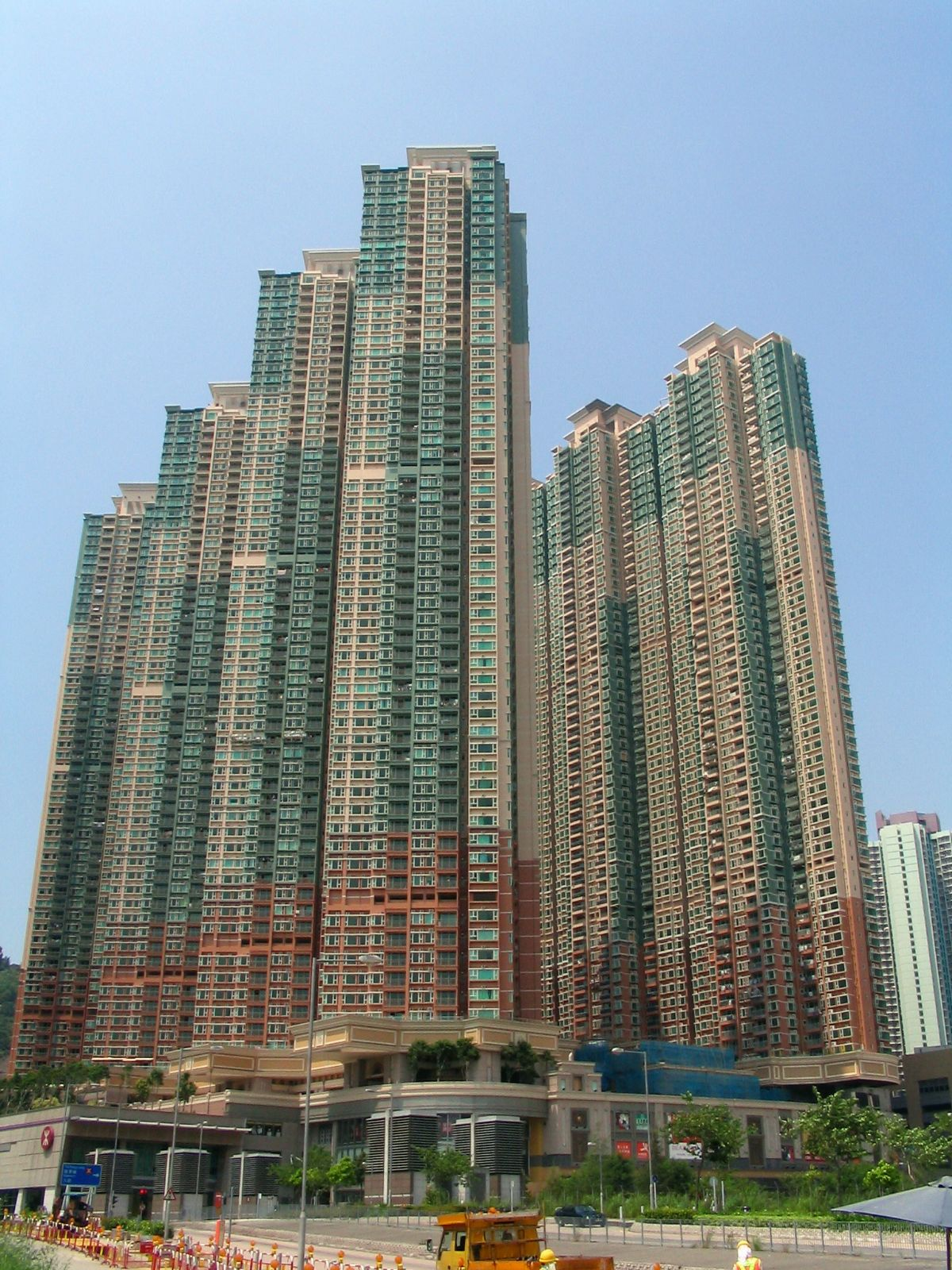
Metro Town (left) and its Phase 2, Le Point (right)

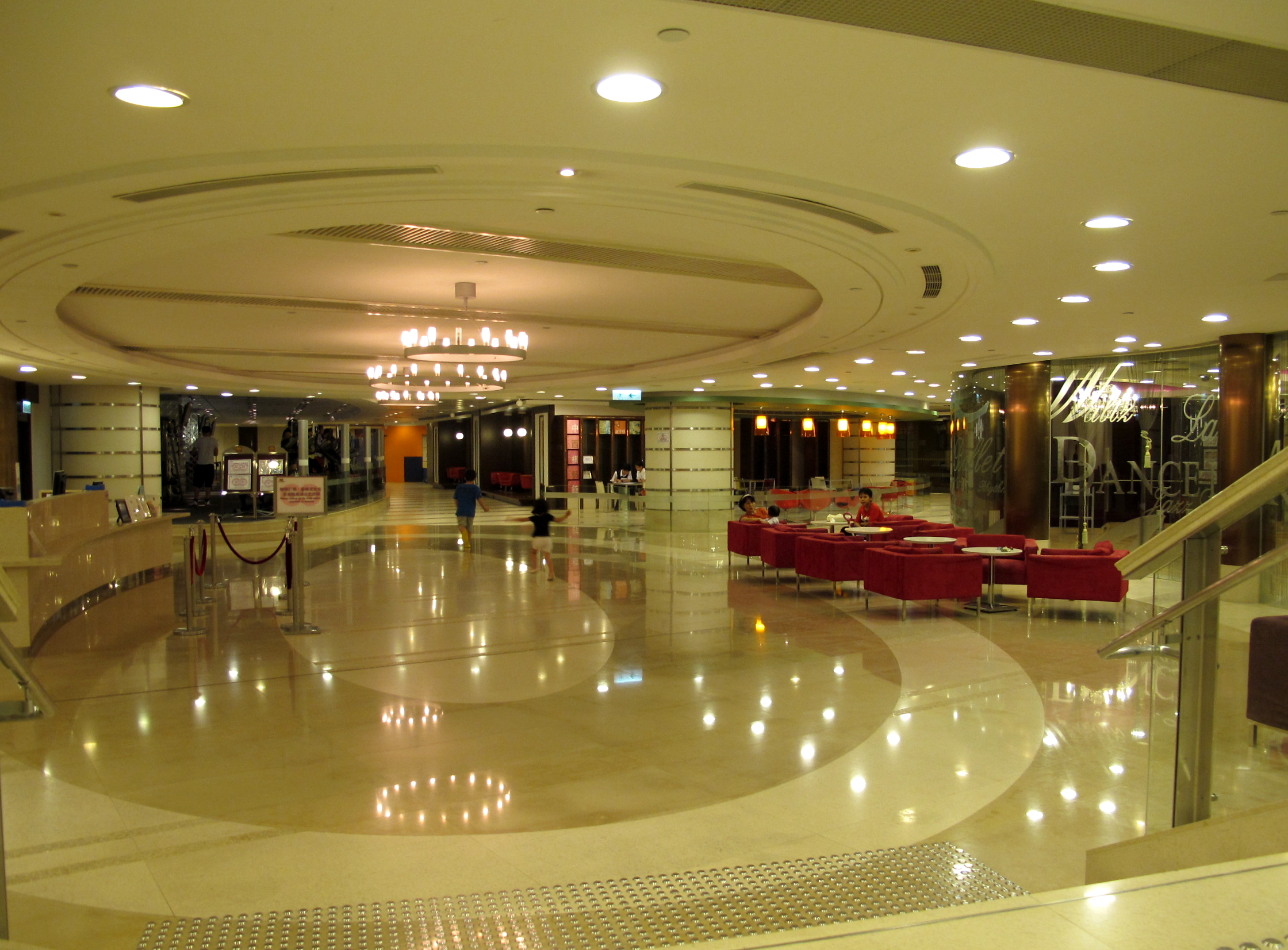
Metro Town Clubhouse

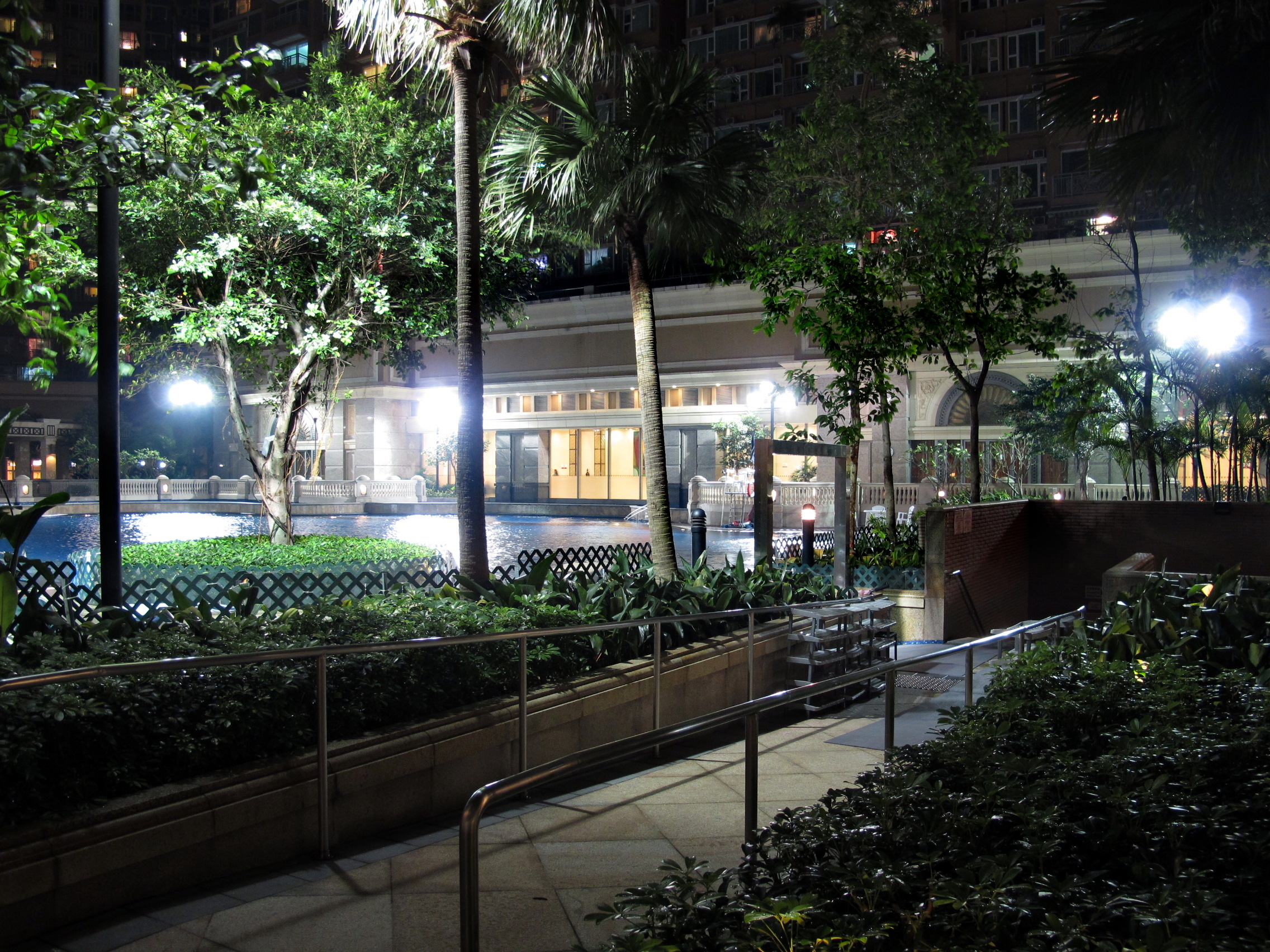
Podium Garden

Metro Town Phase One, often abbreviated to Metro Town (Chinese: 都會駅; Jyutping: Dou1 wui6 jik6), is a private residential high-rise development located in the Tseung Kwan O district of the New Territories in Hong Kong, on top of the MTR station in Tiu Keng Leng. It was a joint development by Cheung Kong Holdings, Nan Fung Group and MTR Corporation, which began in 2006.

The complex consists of four towers, each of which ranks among the tallest buildings in the city. The tallest buildings in the complex are Metro Town Tower 1 and Metro Town Tower 2 (also called Le Point), which both rise 205 metres (673 ft) and have 62 floors. The towers are tied with Four Seasons Place as the 45th-tallest buildings in Hong Kong. Towers 3 and 5 rise 188 metres (617 ft) and have 63 floors, standing as the 76th-tallest buildings in the city and tied in rank with One and Two Exchange Square. The entire complex was completed in 2006. Metro Town is planned to contain ten skyscrapers, but as of 2008 only the four towers of Phase One have been constructed. This first phase of the project contains 1,676 residential units.

== Phase Two: Le Point ==
Le Point (French: [lə pwɛ̃]; Chinese: 城中駅; Jyutping: Sing4 zung1 jik6) is a private housing estate belonging to Phase Two of Metro Town Its five towers (which are named "Tower 6" to "Tower 10") were jointly developed by Cheung Kong Holdings, Nan Fung Group and MTR Corporation. Completed in 2008, it is comprised a total of 2,096 units.

== Demographics ==
According to the 2016 by-census, Metro Town had a population of 11,678. The median age was 38.1 and the majority of residents (87.4 per cent) were of Chinese ethnicity. The average household size was 3.3 people. The median monthly household income of all households (i.e. including both economically active and inactive households) was HK$71,710.

== Politics ==
Metro Town is located in Do Shin constituency of the Sai Kung District Council. It is currently represented by Cheung Chin-pang, who was elected in the 2019 elections.

== See also ==
- List of tallest buildings in Hong Kong
