= Do Shin (constituency) =

Constituency of the Sai Kung District Council

- Elected constituency for the Sai Kung District Council
- Boundary of Do Shin in Sai Kung District
- District: Sai Kung
- Legislative Council constituency: New Territories South East
- Population: 15,063 (2019)
- Electorate: 7,259 (2019)

Current constituency
- Created: 2015
- Number of members: One
- Member: Cheung Chin-pang (Independent)
- Created from: Wai Do; Kin Shin; Choi Kin

Do Shin is one of the 29 constituencies in the Sai Kung District.

The constituency returns one district councillor to the Sai Kung District Council, with an election every four years.

Do Shin constituency is loosely based on Shin Ming Estate in Tseung Kwan O with estimated population of 15,314.

== Councillors represented ==
Election	Member	Party
2015	Cheung Chin-pang	Independent

== Election results ==
=== 2010s ===
Sai Kung District Council Election, 2019: Do Shin
Party	Candidate	Votes	%	±%
Independent	Cheung Chin-pang	2,568	49.05	+7.65
Democratic	Winfield Chong Wing-fai	1,741	33.25	
Ind. democrat	Li Pak-tong	927	17.70	
Majority		827	15.80	
Turnout		5,248	72.33	
Independent hold		Swing		

Sai Kung District Council Election, 2015: Do Shin
Party	Candidate	Votes	%	±%
Independent	Cheung Chin-pang	1,216	41.4	
Independent	Ruby Mok	617	21.0	
People Power (Frontier)	So Ho	572	19.5	
Independent	Andrew Shuen Pak-man	531	18.1	
Majority		599	20.4	
Turnout		2,954	52.2	
Independent win (new seat)				
