= Burnaby Public Library =

Public library that serves Burnaby, British Columbia, Canada

- Established: 1954
- Branches: 4

Collection
- Items collected: Books, e-books, music, cds, periodicals, maps, genealogical archives, business directories, local history,
- Size: 700 000+ items

Access and use
- Circulation: 3,010,470
- Population served: 232,755

Other information
- Budget: CA $14,188,200
- Director: Jackie Flowers (Chief Librarian), Anna Lu (Library Board Chair)
- Employees: 120.59 (FTE)
- Website: bpl.bc.ca

Burnaby Public Library or BPL is a public library that serves Burnaby, British Columbia and the surrounding Lower Mainland. According to its 2019–2022 strategic plan, BPL aims to "empower the community to engage with and share stories, ideas and information." BPL provides access to information services and library collections (including books, DVDs, newspapers, magazines and research materials) through its four branches as well as online and through community outreach.

== Services ==
BPL provides a broad range of services and programs that reflect the needs of its community. The following list is a small sample of the regular services available:

- Information and reference services
- Access to full text databases
- Community information
- Internet access
- Readers' advisory services
- Storytimes for babies, toddlers and preschoolers
- Programs for children, youth, adults and seniors
- Newcomer services including English as an additional language supports
- Delivery to homebound individuals
- Interlibrary loan
- Free downloadable audiobooks
- Movie nights
- "Book bike" mobile library outreach
- Philosophers' Cafe series, in partnership with Simon Fraser University

== History ==
Burnaby's first library was founded in 1927 as the North Burnaby Library Association with members paying one dollar to use a collection of 397 books. The first actual library building was established on East Hastings Street in 1935.

In 1954, a municipal bylaw was enacted to officially establish the Burnaby Public Library. After merging with the North Burnaby Library Association in 1957, BPL's first permanent library building, the McGill Branch, was built in North Burnaby in 1961. The current 27,00 square-foot branch was completed in 2001. The branch was named after Grace McGill, a volunteer with the North Burnaby Library Association since its 1927 inception.

The Kingsway branch was established in 1962 followed by the Central Park branch in 1974 and the Cameron branch in 1980.

In 1991, the Central Park branch was replaced by the Bob Prittie Metrotown branch, named in honour of former Burnaby teacher, MP, alderman, mayor and library board member Robert "Bob" Prittie. Building on the nucleus of the Kingsway branch collection, the Bob Prittie Metrotown Branch became BPL's 'central' branch, and between 1991 and 2008, the library assembled remarkable subject collections at the location. A notable example was the British Columbia "Special Collections", first established at the library's administrative/technical services site on Thunderbird Crescent in 1973 and moved to the Bob Prittie Metrotown Branch in 1991. The purpose of the collection was to provide a comprehensive resource on the history, peoples and lands of the province. Beginning in 1973, the significant British Columbia titles published each year were added to the collection, and the library also purchased important out of print titles as they became available. By 2020 the collection had grown to over six thousand volumes and included periodical and annual titles dating back to the 1870s.

Between 2009 and 2023, in a series of steps the Bob Prittie Metrotown Branch discarded approximately half its adult non-fiction collection, and focused more on library (event) programming and community relations. In 2022–23 due to shelf space constraints, approximately four thousand volumes and the historic back-files of B.C. periodicals and annuals were discarded from "Special Collections". Following a 2022 fire adjacent to the ground floor Children's area, the interior of the branch was re-arranged to better reflect the library's new priorities.

In 2009, the Kingsway branch was closed and replaced with the Tommy Douglas branch named after Canadian politician Tommy Douglas, who served as the Member of the House of Commons of Canada for the now-defunct Burnaby—Coquitlam district from 1962 to 1968.

== Branches ==
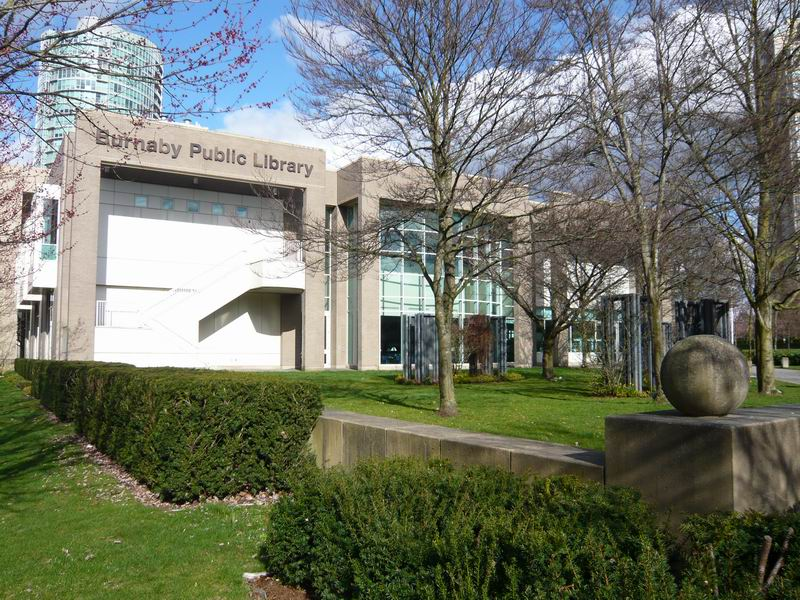
Bob Prittie Metrotown branch

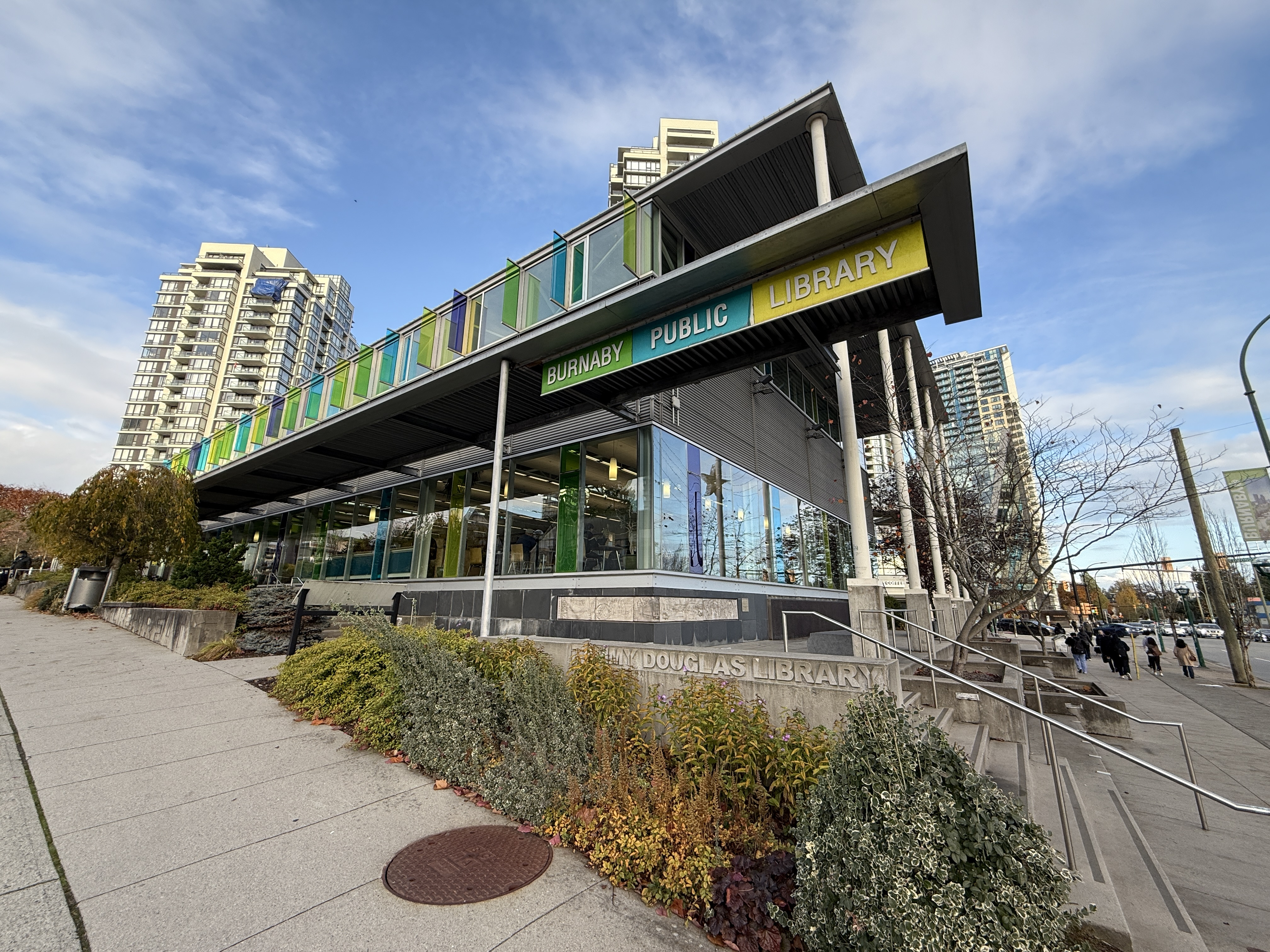
Tommy Douglas Library

The library has four branches

- Bob Prittie Metrotown — 49°13′41.2″N 123°0′23.1″W: As of 2012, this 61,000 square foot branch holds 383,771 items and serves as BPL's main research library with a reference collection that includes local and provincial historical materials, legal and business information, car repair manuals The branch features 21 public internet stations and three stations for accessing the library's database collection.
- McGill — 49°16′57.2″N 123°0′1.9″W: This 20,000 square foot branch holds 159,704 items as of 2012, and features 16 public internet stations and three stations dedicated to accessing BPL's database collection. The City of Burnaby Archives, Burnaby's official repository for municipal records dating back to 1892, occupies a 4,000-square-foot space adjacent to the McGill branch.
- Tommy Douglas — 49.218961°N 122.952336°W: The Tommy Douglas branch is 17,500 square feet and holds 84,568 items as of 2012. Opened on November 21, 2009, this building replaces the old Kingsway branch. The branch features 34 public internet stations, which includes six children's terminals. This branch is also home to Bibliotech, BPL's creative technology lab which loans digital cameras, camcorders and tripods and provides access to computers with Photoshop, iMovie, Garageband and other creative digital software.
- Cameron — 49°15′13.5″N 122°53′54.3″W: As of 2012 this 5,000 square foot library holds 62,941 items and provides public internet and computer access via eight computer terminals. The branch was renovated in 2016.
