= List of heritage buildings in Vancouver =

Heritage Buildings In Vancouver
Heritage Building Classification
- Class A: Primary Significant
- Class B: Significant
- Class C: Character or Contextual

Heritage Protection Subclass
- Class (M): Municipal – City of Vancouver Government
- Class (P): Provincial – British Columbia Government
- Class (F): Federal – Canadian Government

Other sub-classifications
- Class (H): Heritage Revitalization Agreement
- Class (HC): Heritage Conservation Covenant
- Class (I): Interior features & fixtures are protected
- Class (L): Landscapes are protected

National Historic Sites
- Although the buildings may be designated National Historic Sites by the Federal Government of Canada, the site is not protected until there is municipal or provincial designation or it has a Historical Revitalization Agreement.

The following is a list of buildings and structures classified as Schedule "A" and Schedule "B" heritage buildings by the City of Vancouver, British Columbia, Canada. These are designated heritage buildings, and as such are legally protected by the city's heritage by-law No. 4837.

The list does not include:

- Buildings in Gastown or Chinatown. These areas are geographically designated heritage sites by the province of British Columbia, although the city is responsible for protecting heritage buildings therein.
- Buildings and structures designated by By-laws enacted since 31 January 2003.
- Other heritage structures that may be protected by the federal or provincial governments.

== Assembly ==
(Group A) - places used for people gathering for entertainment, worship, and eating or drinking. Examples: churches, restaurants (with 50 or more possible occupants), theatres, and stadiums.

Name Heritage Class	Location Neighbourhood	Description	Year	Builder or Architect	Photo
Brock House (Thorley Park)	3875; Point Grey Road	This Tudor Revival house was originally a private residence and at one time a Royal Canadian Mounted Police detachment. This is now a seniors activity centre, Brock House Society, and a restaurant open to the public. Brock House Restaurant stages over 200 weddings per year. For more information see the Society's 2012 publication THORLEY PARK TO BROCK HOUSE: From Family Home to Heritage Landmark, 1912 - 2012. Jo Pleshakov, Editor.	1911	Samuel Maclure, architect	
Bay Theatre (Starlight Theatre)	907-935; Denman Street	This Art Moderne style theatre included a sign tower. The present owners, Amadon Group, requested a variance from the city by-laws in order to make the building viable and preserve the heritage building. The redesign was by Hewitt, Tan & Kwasnicky Architects'.	1939	Dominion Construction Ltd., original builder Paul Kwasnicky, architect?	
Pantages Theatre	144-156; East Hastings Street	Demolished 2011.	1907–1908	Edward Evans Blackmore, architect & designer B. Marcus Priteca	
Holy Rosary Cathedral	646; Richards Street	The cathedral is the seat of the Roman Catholic Archdiocese of Vancouver. Among other notable events, it was the setting for the civic funeral of popular English Bay lifeguard Joe Fortes. The style is French Gothic, and very different from the castellated Anglican, United Church and Baptist churches on Burrard.	1899–1900	Julien & Williams, architects	
Provincial Courthouse	800; West Georgia Street	This Neo-classical building was originally designed by Francis Rattenbury, who also designed the Empress Hotel & the Parliament Building in Victoria. In 1912 the West wing was added and designed by Thomas Hooper. In 1983 the building was renovated & restored by architect, Arthur Erickson and is the current home of the Vancouver Art Gallery.	1906–1913	Francis Rattenbury, architect	
Gabriola (Angus Apartments)	1531; Davie Street	Gabriola was built for B.T. Rogers, founder of B.C. Sugar Refining Co. This Queen Anne grand mansion, is located in the Vancouver West End. The building became the Angus Apartments in 1925. It became a restaurant, but it is currently vacant.	1901	Samuel Maclure, architect	
Hycroft Manor	1489; McRae Avenue	The house of General Alexander Duncan McRae and family where frequent parties were hosted that were "must attend" for the city's socialites. McRae donated it to the government of Canada for use as a veteran's hospital. It is now used by the University Women's Club. Today it is one of the most-used filming locations in Vancouver.	1909	Thomas Hooper, architect	
Heritage Hall; Class: A(M)	3102; Main Street; Mount Pleasant	Originally a post office, this building was occupied by the Royal Canadian Mounted Police in the 1970s before being restored in the 1980s as a community arts venue. The design is said to derive from a misdirected set of plans that were meant for another city in the Prairies, which got the smaller building meant to have been constructed here.	1914	Archibald Campbell Hope, architect	
Hastings Mill Store	1575; Alma Road	The oldest building in Vancouver, moved by barge from its original location at the north foot of Dunlevy to Point Grey & Alma. The Native Daughters of British Columbia opened it as a museum.	1865	Erected by Captain Edward Stamp & Associates	
Orpheum Theatre	884; Granville Street	Originally a vaudeville house on Theatre Row, the building was fully restored in the 1970s and is now an important live music venue and home to the Vancouver Symphony Orchestra.	1927	B. Marcus Priteca, architect	
Aberthau House (Rear House)	4397; West 2nd Avenue	This Tudor Revival was built for James S. Rear, General Manager, of American Life Insurance. Later bought by Col. Victor Spencer who called it Aberthau (Welsh for: place filled with light). Presently, it is a cultural and recreational center run by the Vancouver Park Board.	1909	Samuel Maclure, architect	
St. Andrew's-Wesley United Church	1012; Nelson Street	This a Gothic Revival style church. The church was constructed after the union of the Methodist & Presbyterian churches, to form the United Church of Canada.	1931–1933	George Twizell & Robert Twizell, architects	
Tulk House Rosemary (Order of the Convent of Our Lady of the Cenacle)	3689; Selkirk Street	This Tudor Revival manor was built for whiskey baron & lawyer, Edward Tulk, who named the house after his daughter Rosemary. It was also home to the lieutenant governor of BC John William Fordham Johnson. From 1947, the house was owned by the Order of the convent of Our Lady of the Cenacle until 1996, where it was used as a retreat.	1915	Samuel Maclure & Cecil Fox, architects	
St. James Anglican Church	303; East Cordova Street	An art deco variant on Byzantine church design.	1935–1937	Adrian Gilbert Scott, architect	
Christ Church Cathedral	690; Burrard Street	Style is English Romanesque	1889–1895	Charles Osborn Wickenden, architect	
Beatty Street Drill Hall	620; Beatty Street	Home of The British Columbia Regiment (Duke of Connaught's Own), the most senior military unit in the city.	1899–1901	David Ewart, architect	
Seaforth Armoury	Burrard Street @ 1st Avenue	Home of The Seaforth Highlanders of Canada	1935–1936	McCarter and Nairne, architects	
The Vancouver Club	915; West Hastings		1912–1914	Sharp & Thompson, architects	
Alexandra Park Haywood Bandstand	1755; Beach Avenue	The Alexandra Park Bandstand is situated in a triangular-shaped park bordered by Beach Avenue, Burnaby Street and Bidwell Street in Vancouver's West End, overlooking English Bay.	1915		
First Baptist Church	969; Burrard Street	The church suffered a serious fire in 1931. But was restored by a parishioner, Charles Bentall, owner of Dominion Construction.	1911	Burke, Horwood, & White, architects	
St. Paul’s Anglican Church of the West End, Vancouver	1130; Jervis Street	This Gothic Revival church is built in Vancouver's West End.	1905	William Henry Archer, architect	
Holy Trinity Ukrainian Orthodox Cathedral	154; East 10th Avenue	The Holy Trinity Ukrainian Orthodox Parish was established in Vancouver on May 9, 1937. At Easter in 1950, the first Divine Liturgy was served in the newly built, but as yet unfinished, church. In December 1977, the Vancouver City Council designated the church as an architectural Heritage Building and an engraved plaque was placed on the exterior of the church building. The Parish is classified as a Cathedral under the Ukrainian Orthodox Church of Canada.	1950	Sergius Timoshenko, architect	
Stanley Park Pavilion	Stanley Park		1911		
Fire Hall No. 1	270-280; East Cordova Street	Possibly the first fire hall in North America designed specifically for motorized fire trucks, this building was converted into the Fire Hall Arts Centre in the 1970s. Listed as "Fire Hall No. 2."	1906–1907	William T. Whiteway, architect	
Coroner's Court	238-240; East Cordova Street	This building was originally the facility for the city coroner and was later used by the city analyst. It was turned into a museum for the Vancouver Police Department as a project marking the city's centennial in 1986.	1932	Arthur J. Bird, architect	
Chalmers Church	2801 Hemlock		1912	Samuel Buttrey Birds, architect	
Evangelistic Tabernacle	85 East 10th Ave	Please see Mount Pleasant Presbyterian Church	1909–1910		
St. Mary's (Kerrisdale); Church & Hall	2498; West 37th Ave	The church and the parish hall are both designated as heritage buildings.	1913; 1923	Sharp & Thompson, architects	
Vancouver Public Library	750; Burrard	This is the second Vancouver Public Library central branch building after the Carnegie and before the current Library Square opened in 1995. The building is occupied by a lingerie store, the studios of CTV Vancouver station CIVT-TV, part of Bell Media and The Beat 94.5, 103.5 QM/FM, Team 1040, and Team1410.	1957	Harold Semmens and Doug Simpson, architects	
Japanese Hall & School	475; Alexander Street	Seized by the government as part of the Japanese Canadian internment during the Second World War, this building was an important centre of the Japanese community in Vancouver. It has since been returned and restored as a cultural centre and a language school.	1928	Sharp & Thompson, architects	
Stanley Theatre	2750; Granville Street	This Moorish style interior art deco theatre is the last surviving neighbourhood theatre in Vancouver. Today it is a live theatre called the Stanley Industrial Alliance Stage.	1930	Henry Holdsby Simmonds, architect	
Terminal City Lawn Bowling Club	1650 West 14th Avenue		1935		
Connaught Park Fieldhouse	2390 West 10th Avenue		1925		
Memorial Park South Fieldhouse	5950; Prince Albert		1930		
Vancouver Rowing Club Clubhouse	Stanley Park	Originally located on the other side of Coal Harbour, at the foot of the bluff below Hastings Street below the foot of Howe and near the Vancouver Club, the original building was floated across to the present location and rebuilt as a stationary building on pilings. The style is mock Tudor.	1911		
Unitarian Church of Vancouver	949 W 49th Avenue	This modernist church was built in 1964, and added to the Canadian Register of Historic Places in 2008.	1964	Wolfgang Gerson, Architect	
Mount Pleasant Presbyterian Church	2525; Quebec Street	This Romanesque Revival church was used as a church until 1989. The building was used as a performing arts theatre, but was converted to a residential complex by 1994.	1909	Parr and Fee, architects	
St. Francis of Assisi Church	2025 & 2035; Napier Street				
First Church of Christ, Scientist Coastal Church	1160 West Georgia Street	" ... notable as a rare example of a building constructed during the First World War. The two-storey building is a finely-executed example of the Colonial Revival style, uncommon in Vancouver. ... located in downtown Vancouver in a mid-block site with frontage on both West Georgia Street ... and Alberni Street."	1918	Matheson and De Guerre	

== Business ==
(Group B) - places where services are provided (not to be confused with mercantile, below). Examples: banks, insurance agencies, government buildings (including police and fire stations), and doctor's offices.

Name Heritage Class	Location Neighbourhood	Description	Year	Builder or Architect	Photo
Douglas Lodge (Bank of Commerce)	2799; Granville Street	This Georgian Revival building is a commercial & residential landmark building on the corner of Granville Street and 12th Avenue. Once home of Justin Trudeau, Prime Minister of Canada Douglas Lodge, a heritage building	1912	W.M. Dodd, architect	
London Building	626 West Pender Street	Edwardian Commercial building which was built for the London and British North American Company in 1912 when Britain was still a significant source of investment money for Vancouver buildings.	1912	Architects: Somervell & Putnam	
Firehall #6	1000; Nicola Street		1907	Honeyman and Curtis, architects	
Royal Bank Tower (Vancouver)	675; West Hastings Street		1929-1931	Sumner Godfrey Davenport, architect	
Tellier Tower (Holden Building)	10-16; East Hastings Street		1910–1911	William Tuff Whiteway, architect	
Hudson's Bay Insurance Company	900 West Hastings		1911	William A. Doctor, architect	
Rogers Building	470 Granville Street	ten-storey heritage commercial office	1912	Gould & Champney	
Dick Building	1490; West Broadway	Named after William Dick, who was a Vancouver business man and MLA.	1929	Townley & Matheson, architects	
Sun Tower	100; West Pender Street	Originally built as the Vancouver World building, it acquired its current name when the Vancouver Sun (originally the Vancouver News-Advertiser) newspaper occupied the building between 1937 and 1964. At time of construction, it was the tallest building in the British Empire, succeeded in that capacity by the Marine Building.	1912	L. D. Taylor; William T. Whiteway, architect	
Federal Building	715; West Hastings Street	Part of the Sinclair Centre complex.	1937		
Marine Building	355; Burrard Street	The tallest skyscraper in the British Empire when it opened in 1930, this marine-themed Art Deco structure cost $2.3 million but was sold to the Guinness family for only $900,000 once the Great Depression set in. It was restored in the 1980s. Its terra-cotta tiled art deco entrance, ornate revolving door and etched brass elevators doors form one of the busiest filming locations in the city.	1929–1930	J. W. Hobbs; McCarter and Nairne, architects	
National Harbours Board Building	50; North Dunlevy Street		1905		
BC Permanent Loan Building	330; West Pender Street		1907	Hooper and Watkins, architects	
Canada Permanent Building (Century House)	432; Richards Street		1911	John Smith Davidson Taylor, architect	
Vancouver Block	736; Granville Street	Built in 1912 for Dominic Burns, brother of Sen. Patrick Burns, who also managed P. Burns & Co. Meat Packing. The building permits were filed on January 23, 1911, for a cost of $75.70. The building was completed for a total cost of $400,000.	1912	Parr and Fee, architects	
Winch Building	739; West Hastings Street	Part of the Sinclair Centre complex.	1909	Thomas Hooper, architect	
Vancouver City Hall	453; West 12th Avenue	After years of political wrangling while city affairs were conducted from a temporary location in the Holden Building, the new city hall was finally completed on 4 December 1936, Vancouver's jubilee year. The original design included a twin to the current building, across Cambie Street where the City Square redevelopment of the former Normal School and Model School is now, as a gateway leading across a jointly planned rebuild of the Cambie Street Bridge. The larger project was cancelled because of the Depression.	1936	Townley & Matheson, architects	
Canadian Northern Railway Station (Pacific Central Station)	1150; Station Street	This Neoclassical Revival building is the built on landfill that was originally part of False Creek. It continues to function as a train station but in 1993 the station became a multi transportation station where intercity buses also depart from. The heritage designation includes the neon sign.	1917–1919	Pratt & Ross, architects	
Waterfront Station; Class: A(M)	601; Cordova Street	Waterfront Station is a major intermodal public transportation facility and the main transit terminus in Downtown Vancouver, British Columbia, Canada.	1914	Barott, Blackader, and Webster	
Toronto Dominion Bank	560-580 West Hastings Street		1920		
Bank of Montreal - Main & Prior Branch; Class: B(M)(H)(I)	906; Main Street; Strathcona	This Classical Revival style temple bank is one of three that were designed by Honeyman & Curtis. In 2005 this building was incorporated into a new development of apartments and acts as the main foyer to these units.	1929	Honeyman & Curtis, architects	
Commercial & 1st Class: A	1704; East 1st Avenue; Grandview-Woodland	Commercial & residential building that is the heart of what the locals called The Drive (referring to Commercial Drive).			

== Educational ==
(Group E) - schools and day care centers up to the 12th grade.

Name Heritage Class	Location Neighbourhood	Description	Year	Builder or Architect	Photo
Lord Strathcona Elementary School; Class: A(M) & B(M)	592; East Pender Street; Strathcona	Descended from the first school in Vancouver, Lord Strathcona Elementary consists of four buildings and is now adjoined to a community centre. The primary building was constructed in 1921 from the bricks from the original 1891 school building on this site. It was originally called the East End School before changing its name (followed many years later by the neighbourhood) to Strathcona.	1897; 1913; 1915; 1921; 1930.	William Blackmore, architect	
Convent of the Sacred Heart (St. Georges School); Class: A(M)(L)	3851; West 29th Avenue; Dunbar-Southlands	The Convent of the Sacred Heart high school was founded by the Sisters of the Sacred Heart, in 1912, in the city of Vancouver, British Columbia, Canada. It was an all-girls Catholic school until 1979, when it was sold to St. George's School (Vancouver) and became an all-boys (non denominational) Junior school. The building has become a Vancouver City Heritage Building and St. George’s has restored, maintained and expanded the school’s Gothic Revival style architecture. The Architect of the school was: Charles G. Badgley	1912	Charles G. Badgley, architect	
Normal School; Class: A(M)	501; West 12th Avenue; Fairview	Now along with the former Model School, it is part of the City Square Shopping Centre. This Gothic Revival style building was a school for teachers. (King Edward High School was four blocks west on 12th Avenue and became the King Edward Campus of Vancouver Community College until its relocation, after a fire, to East Broadway near Clark Drive). In 1989 the school was redesigned by architect, Paul Merrick, to become offices & stores for the inside of a mall.	1909	Pearce & Hope, architects	
Model School; Class: A(M)	555; West 12th Avenue; Fairview	Now along with the former Normal School, it is part of the City Square Shopping Centre. This Romanesque Revival was originally an elementary school teacher's training school. In 1989 the school was redesigned by architect, Paul Merrick, to become offices & stores for the inside of a mall. There were four attempts to demolish the Normal & Model Schools by the Vancouver School Board.	1905	Edward Evans Blackmore, architect	
472 Schoolhouse; Class: B(M)	906; West 19th Avenue; Fairview	This Pioneer Cottege style school was the second school to open in what was then, the Municipality of Point Grey. The school was saved by the Douglas Park neighbourhood and Allen & Bronna Fenichel. The building was moved to the present location behind their house of 906 West 19th.	1901; 1908	unknown	

== Factory ==
(Group F) - places where goods are manufactured or repaired (unless considered "High-Hazard" (below)). Examples: factories and dry cleaners.

Name Heritage Class	Location Neighbourhood	Description	Year	Builder or Architect	Photo	Plaque

== High-hazard ==
(Group H) - places involving production or storage of very flammable or toxic materials. Includes places handling explosives and/or highly toxic materials (such as fireworks, hydrogen peroxide, and cyanide).

Name Heritage Class	Location Neighbourhood	Description	Year	Builder or Architect	Photo

== Institutional ==
(Group I) - places where people are physically unable to leave without assistance. Examples: hospitals, nursing homes, and prisons. In some jurisdictions, Group I may be used to designate Industrial.

Name Heritage Class	Location Neighbourhood	Description	Year	Builder or Architect	Photo
Taylor Manor; Class: B(M)	951; Boundary Road; Hastings-Sunrise	This Tudor Revival building was built by the City of Vancouver in 1915, as a dormitory for destitute seniors. Originally called Old People's Home was renamed Taylor Manor after ex-Vancouver Mayor Louis Denison Taylor who died in poverty at age 89.	1913	Perry & Fowler, architects	
C.G. Johnson House (Oakhurst); Class: A(M)(H)	950; West 58th Avenue; Marpole	This Craftsman style house was built for shipping magnate Major C. Gardiner Johnson. The home became a private nursing home, called Oakhurst, in 1938.	1912	R. Mackay Fripp, architect	
Glen Brae House (Glen Hospital) (Canuck Place); Class: A(M)	1690 Matthews Avenue; Shaughnessy	Built for the lumber and real estate baron William Lamont Tait.	1910	Parr and Fee, architects	

== Mercantile ==
(Group M) - places where goods are displayed and sold. Examples: grocery stores, department stores, and gas stations.

Name Heritage Class	Location Neighbourhood	Description	Year	Builder or Architect	Photo
Woodward's Building	101; West Hastings Street	The Original 1903-08 section of the Woodward's Department Store store was saved and is restored at the corner of Hastings and Abbott Streets, and is integrated into the mixed-use Woodward's development. It now houses SFU's School for the Contemporary Arts.	1908	William T. Whiteway, architect	
Hudson's Bay Department Store	674; Granville Street	The Hudson's Bay Company (chartered 1670) built this department store at the intersection of West Georgia and Seymour (the part in shadow in the photograph) and also along Granville, then filled in the corner of West Georgia and Granville by replacing older buildings (the joins being seamless and visible only by the slightest difference in the shade of the terra cotta), and finally made an addition in simplified style along Seymour in the Downtown Vancouver area. The same architectural building is also found in the Hudson's Bay stores in the cities of Victoria, Calgary and Winnipeg.	1913; 1926; 1950	Burke, Horwood & White, architects	
Vancouver Motors (Dominion Motors)	901 Seymour Street		1925	Townley and Matheson, architects	
Canadian Linen Supply	1228-1232; Richards Street		1932	Townley and Matheson, architects	
Jones Tent & Awning	2034 West 11th Avenue		1919		
Foley Building	698; West 16th Avenue	This Edwardian style building was the first commercial building of the new Municipality of Point Grey. Owner, James B. Foley, ran his real estate business, while renting the corner unit to a grocery store.	1909	Unknown	
Bank of Montreal; Class: C	2490; Main Street; Mount Pleasant				
Royal Bank; Class: B	2345-2349; Main Street; Mount Pleasant				

== Residential ==
(Group R) - places providing accommodations for overnight stay (excluding Institutional). Examples: houses, apartment buildings, hotels, and motels.

Name Heritage Class	Location Neighbourhood	Description	Year	Builder or Architect	Photo
Shannon	7255 Granville Street		1912–1913	B.T. Rogers; Somerville and Putnam, architects	
Hodson Manor	1254 West 7th Avenue		1894 and 1903		
James England House	2300 Birch Street		1907		
Steamboat/Fairview House	1151 West 8th Avenue		1890		
Banff Apartments	1201 W. Georgia Street	Originally Florence Court residential hotel, now rental apartments. The last remaining example of the New York-style posh residential hotels and apartments that once lined West Georgia Street between Thurlow St. and Stanley Park. The building lost some of its original classical detail to modernization attempts in the period between 1940 and 1970. The building was deteriorating through the 1980s and 1990s and suffered a serious fire in October 2002. Since the fire the interior of the building has been completely re-plumbed, re-wired and otherwise restored.	1909	Henry Barton Watson, architect	
Hotel Vancouver	900 West Georgia Street	This heritage hotel was the 3rd Hotel Vancouver and took 11 years to complete. The first two original hotels were built on the corner of Granville & Georgia in 1887 & 1916.	1929–1939	John S. Archibald & John Schofield, architects	
Sylvia Hotel	1154 Gilford Street	A historic hotel on English Bay, the Sylvia was originally an apartment building before being converted during the Second World War to house merchant marine crews. It was the tallest building in the West End until the late 1950s, and the location of the first cocktail bar in the city. The "dine in the sky" restaurant was eventually moved to the ground floor.	1911–1912	W.P. White, architect	
Davis House	166 West 10th Avenue		1891		
The Roedde House	1415 Barclay Street	This Queen Anne style house is currently maintained by the Roedde House Preservation Society.	1893	Gustav Roedde; Francis Rattenbury, architect	
Hirshfield House	1963 Comox Street	Private residential, West End. The style is Arts and Crafts both in building design and landscaping.	1910	Gamble and Knapp, architects	
Tudor Manor	1311 Beach Avenue		1927–1928	Townley and Matheson, architects	
Residential	2202 Cypress Street	Private	1914		
Residential	2220 Cypress Street	Private	1914		
Residential	1096 West 10th Avenue	Private	1922		
Residential	883 Broughton Street	Private residential, West End.	1903		
Residential	889 Broughton Street	Private residential, West End.	1903		
Residential	891 Broughton Street	Private residential, West End.	1903		
Residential	1416 Haro Street	Private	1909		
Residential	1430-1432 Haro Street	Private	1902		
Residential	1436 Haro Street	Private	1907		
Barclay Manor	1447 (1477?) Barclay Street	This Queen Anne style home was once a private hospital, a home for Catholic working girls, a former boarding house, and it is now a senior's centre. Barclay Manor is part of Barclay Heritage Square in the West End.	1890; 1909	R.J. McDonald, architect (1909)	
Weeks House	1459 Barclay Street	This typical West End architecture style house is now part of the Barclay Heritage Square.	1895	built for George W. Weeks	
The Bloomfield House	2532 Columbia Street		1900		
Residential	1642 Stephens Street	Private	1911		
Residential	3846 West 10th Ave	Private	1936–1937		
Residential	117 West 10th Avenue	Private	1895		
Residential	140 West 10th Ave	Private	1910		
Residential	144 West 10th Avenue	Private	1894		
Residential	148 West 10th Avenue	Private	1908		
Residential	150 West 10th Avenue	Private	1907		
Residential	156 West 10th Avenue	Private	1894		
Residential; Class: A	2953 - 2955 Ontario Street	Private	1907		
Residential	989 Bute	Now Ashby House B&B, West End.	1899		
Residential	1235 Nelson Street	Private residential, West End.	1931	Ross A. Lort, architect	
Kensington Place	1386 Nicola Street	Private residential, West End.	1912	Phillip Julien, architect	
Residential	2967 West 42nd Avenue	Private	1915		
Fee House	1119 Broughton		1904	Parr and Fee, architects	
Residential	2055 West 14th Avenue	Private	1910		
Randall Building	535-565 West Georgia	Originally an office building for the brokerage firm, S.W. Randall Company	1929	Richard T. Perry, architect	
Residential	8264 Hudson	Private	1912		
Residential	835-839 Cambie Street	Private	1929		
Residential	1037 Matthews Avenue	Private	1913		
Haigler House	3537 West 30th Avenue		1925		
Residential	849, 853, 863, 867 Hamilton Street	Private	1895–1900		
Residential	2740 Yukon	Private	1913		
Residential	1865 West 16th Avenue	Private	1912		
Residential	280 East 6th Avenue	Private	1908		
Residential	2675 Oak Street	Private	1929		
Residential	967 West 8th Avenue	Private	1905		
Residential	1178 Hamilton Street	Private	1912		
Residential	901-911 Homer Street	Private	1910		
Residential	1183 West 10th Avenue	Private	1907		
Residential	2830 West 1st Avenue	Private	1909		
Residential	901 West 23rd Avenue	Private	1912		
Residential	138 West 10th Avenue	Private	1904		
Residential	800 Cassiar Street	Private	1912		
Residential	2836-2838 Birch Street	Private	1910		
Vernon Block	225-255 East Broadway Street		1930	Townley and Matheson, architect	
Residential	2622 West 5th Avenue	Private	1914		
Residential	3143 Crown Street	Private	1941		
Abbott House	720 Jervis Street		1900		
Residential	1200 Homer Street	Private	1912		
Residential	638 and 644 Hawks Avenue	Private	1905		
Hotel St. Clair	577-579 Richards Street	Hotel, previously "Dunsmuir Rooms"	1911	Samuel Buttrey Birds, architect	
Residential	5709 Wales Street	Private	1912		
Avalon Dairy Farmhouse	2661 East 43rd Avenue	Private	1908	Jeremiah Crowley	
Residential	3358 SE Marine Drive	Private	1911		
Residential	3010 West 5th Avenue	Private	1921		
Residential	2990 West 5th Avenue	Private	1920		
Residential	2216-2218 St. George Street	Private	1911		
Residential	518 Beatty	Private	1911		
Residential	1050 Nicola	Private residential, West End.	1909		
Grauer House	364 West 10th Avenue		1919		
Residential	1554 East 10th Avenue	Private residence in East Vancouver The mailing address actually reads 1552 E. 10th Ave.	1912		
Residential	2006 West 15th Avenue	Private			
Residential	2855 West 6th Avenue	Private			
Queen Charlotte	1101 Nicola Street	Private residential, West End.	1928		
Residential	5338 Larch Street	Private			
Thomas Shaughnessy House	1551 Angus Drive				
Residential	679 East Georgia Street	Private			
Hotel Georgia	801 West Georgia	A landmark hotel in downtown Vancouver, Hotel Georgia has housed numerous celebrity guests over the years, including Queen Elizabeth II, Elvis Presley, The Beatles, and Errol Flynn, who died while a guest in 1959. It was restored in 1998 and a 52-story skyscraper addition to the property is currently under construction.	1927	Garrow and Graham Sr., architects	
Residential	2104 East 19th Avenue	Private residence in East Vancouver located across from Trout Lake service house in John Hendry Park.			
Residential	285 West 17th Avenue	Private			
Residential	1114 Barclay Street	Private			
Residential	837 West 19th Avenue	Private			
Residential	2132 Cypress Street	Private			
Residential	1850 West 5th Avenue	Private			
Residential	656-658 Union Street	Private			
Residential	1234 Matthews Avenue	Private			
Residential	2640 Oxford Street	Private			
Residential	42 and 46 West 10th Avenue	Private			
Residential	1641 Dunbar Street	Private			
Residential	615 and 621 Princess Street	Private			
Residential	211 Columbia Street	Private			
W Brydon Jack House	3338 Granville Street				
Residential	800 Hawks Avenue	Private			
Residential	664 East Georgia Street	Private			
Residential	1210 Lakewood Street	Private			
Residential	2919 East 29th Avenue	Private residence in East Vancouver located close to the 29th Avenue Skytrain Station.			
Residential	2620 Oxford Street	Private			
Residential	3223 West 37th Avenue	Private			
Residential	326 West Pender Street	Private			
Hawks Avenue residences	504, 508, 512, and 516 Hawks Avenue		1899 and 1900		
Douglas Lodge	2799 Granville Street		1907	William M. Dodd, architect	
St. Luke's Home	309 East Cordova Street		1924		
Palms Hotel	869-873 Granville Street	Only facade has been retained	1893	William Blackmore, architect	
Residential	330 West 15th Ave	Private	1912		
BC Electric Building (BC Hydro Building)	970 Burrard	Commonly known to the locals as the BC Hydro Building, this was the head office tower for the B.C. electricity & gas utility company until 1995, when it was converted into private apartment residences.	1955–1957	Thompson, Berwick, Pratt, and Partners, architects	
Gardner House	3152 West 49th Avenue	The construction of the house is unique in that a concrete slab was poured, then jacked up. A second slab was poured and brick walls were erected. The first slab was rested on the bricks and the second slab was jacked up with a final pouring of the third slab which formed the foundation.	1958	Kenneth Gardner, architect	
Washington Hotel (Hotel Maple) (Hastings Hotel)	177-179 East Hastings Street		1912	Parr and Fee, architects	
Residential	6120 McDonald Street	This a Georgian Revival style private residence, originally built for G.L. Smellie.	1921	William T. Whiteway, architect	
Residential	6120 McDonald Street	This a Tudor Revival style private residence, originally built for Dr. Brett Anderson.	1930	Hodgson & Simmons, architects	
Residential	1550 Balfour Avenue	Private			
J.J. Miller's Kurrajong	1098 Salsbury Drive	This Queen Anne style house was built for Australian, J.J. Miller who developed homes in the Grandview area of East Vancouver.	1908		
Victoria Court; Class: B	1942; East 1st Avenue; Grandview-Woodland	Residential apartments			
Mellish House; Class: B(M)	2325; East 1st Avenue; Grandview-Woodland	Architect Frederick Mellish built this Bungalow style home for his family.	1919	Frederick Mellish, architect & builder	
Residential; Class: A	2033-2035; East 2nd Avenue; Grandview-Woodland	House was built before the by-laws that restrict any house from being built right at the front of the property line.			
Wenonah Apartments; Class: B	2703-2707; Main Street; Mount Pleasant	Formerly Leonard Apartments	1912	William P. White, architect	
Belvedere Court; Class: B	2539-2549; Main Street; Mount Pleasant		1912	Arthur Julius Bird, architect	
Ashnola Apartments; Class: B	2152; Main Street; Mount Pleasant		1913	Braunton and Liebert, architects	
Caroline Court; Class: B	1058; Nelson Street	Residential apartments. Built for James M Pattullo by Dominion Construction in 1911 at a cost of $150,000.	1911	J P Matheson, architect	
Residential; Class: C	3171 West 5th Avenue	Private	1920	Fred Melton, architect and builder	

== Storage ==
(Group S) - places where items are stored (unless considered High-Hazard). Examples: warehouses and parking garages.

Name Heritage Class	Location Neighbourhood	Description	Year	Builder or Architect	Photo
Stewart & Comrie Warehouse	1140-1150 Hamilton		1911		

== Utility and miscellaneous ==
(Group U) - others. Examples: water towers, barns, towers.

Name Heritage Class	Location Neighbourhood	Description	Year	Builder or Architect	Photo
Cambie Heritage Boulevard Cambie St Boulevard - Median	King Edward Avenue and Southwest Marine Drive	A linear central median planted with approximately 450 trees, with two flanking one-way streets and street edge boulevards	1940 Formally Recognized 1993/09/02	Planning firm of Harland Bartholomew and Associates, authors of ‘The Plan for the City of Vancouver.’	

== See also ==
- List of old Canadian buildings
- List of tallest buildings in Vancouver
- List of National Historic Sites of Canada in British Columbia
- Architecture of Vancouver
