= Sylvia Hotel (disambiguation) =

Sylvia Hotel may refer to:

- Sylvia Hotel, a historic Vancouver, British Columbia, Canada landmark located on English Bay and beside Stanley Park
- "The Sylvia Hotel," a song by the Canadian band Zumpano from their 1996 album Goin' Through Changes
- Sylvia Hotel, 1999 album by singer-songwriter Cheryl Wheeler
