= Convent of the Sacred Heart High School (British Columbia) =

Building in Vancouver, Canada

Convent of the Sacred Heart
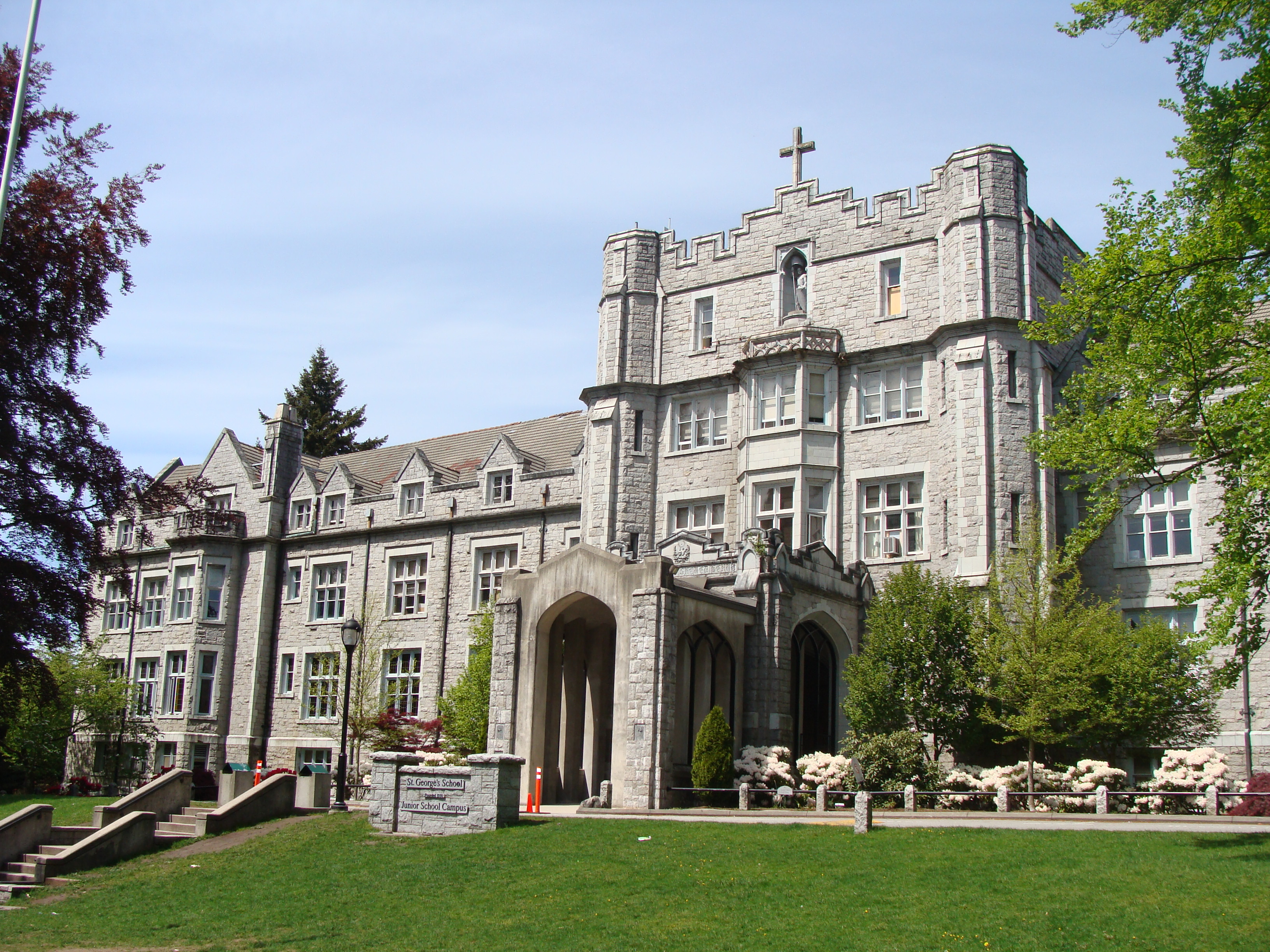
- Currently St. George's Junior School
- Interactive map of the Convent of the Sacred Heart area

General information
- Architectural style: Gothic Revival
- Location: 3851 West 29th Ave, Vancouver, BC, Canada
- Coordinates: 49.2468°N 123.1895°W
- Construction started: 1912
- Completed: 1913
- Client: Sisters of the Sacred Heart

Technical details
- Structural system: Granite & terra cotta facade

Design and construction
- Architect: Charles G. Badgley

The Convent of the Sacred Heart High School was a Catholic girls' school in Vancouver, Canada. The building was constructed in 1912–13 in the Gothic Revival style, and is regarded as being of historic interest. Since 1979 it has been site of the Junior School of St George's School.

== History ==
The Convent of the Sacred Heart was a day and boarding school for girls in Vancouver, British Columbia from 1913 until 1979. During this period, the school was part of the network of girls' schools founded by the Society of the Sacred Heart (RSCJ), which opened its first convent in 1801.

The building was bought by St. George's School for boys to house their Junior School. St. George's has restored, maintained, and expanded the school's Gothic Revival style architecture. The architect of the school was Charles G. Badgley.

The school is listed on the Vancouver Heritage Register, with protections extending to the building site including landscape features.

== Architecture ==
Convent of the Sacred Heart is an excellent example of Vancouver's Gothic Revival style architecture.

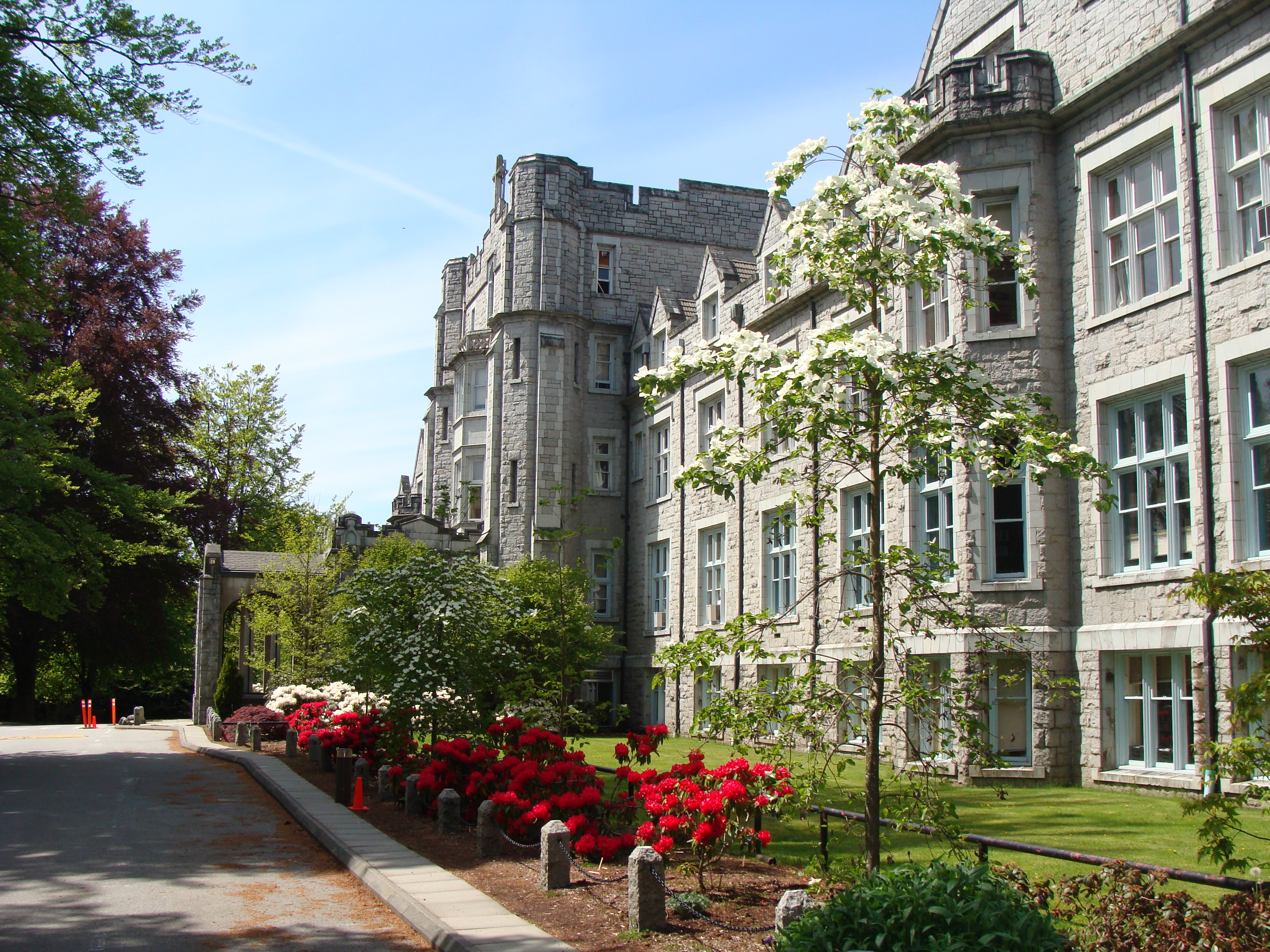
Side profile

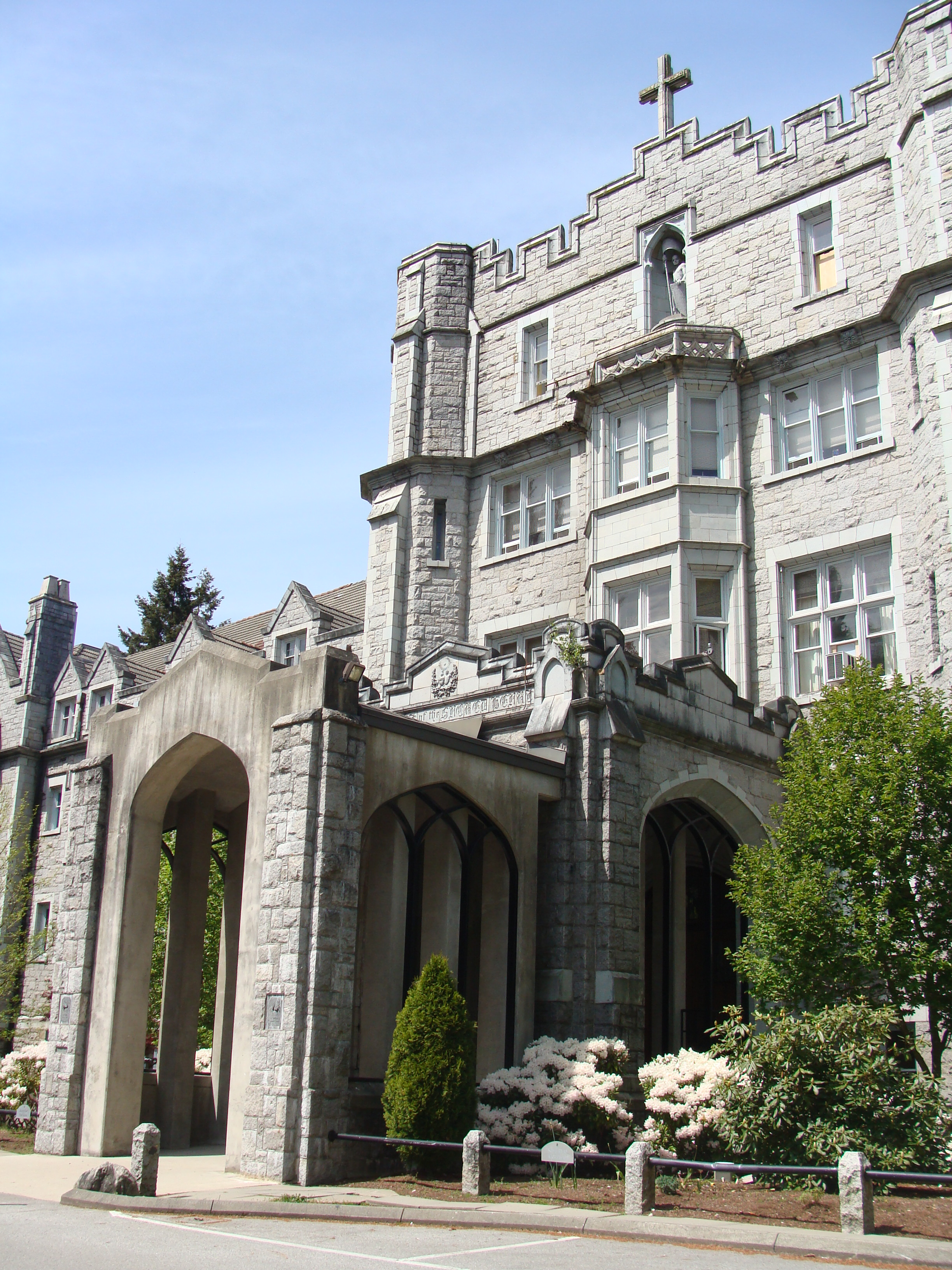
New added archway

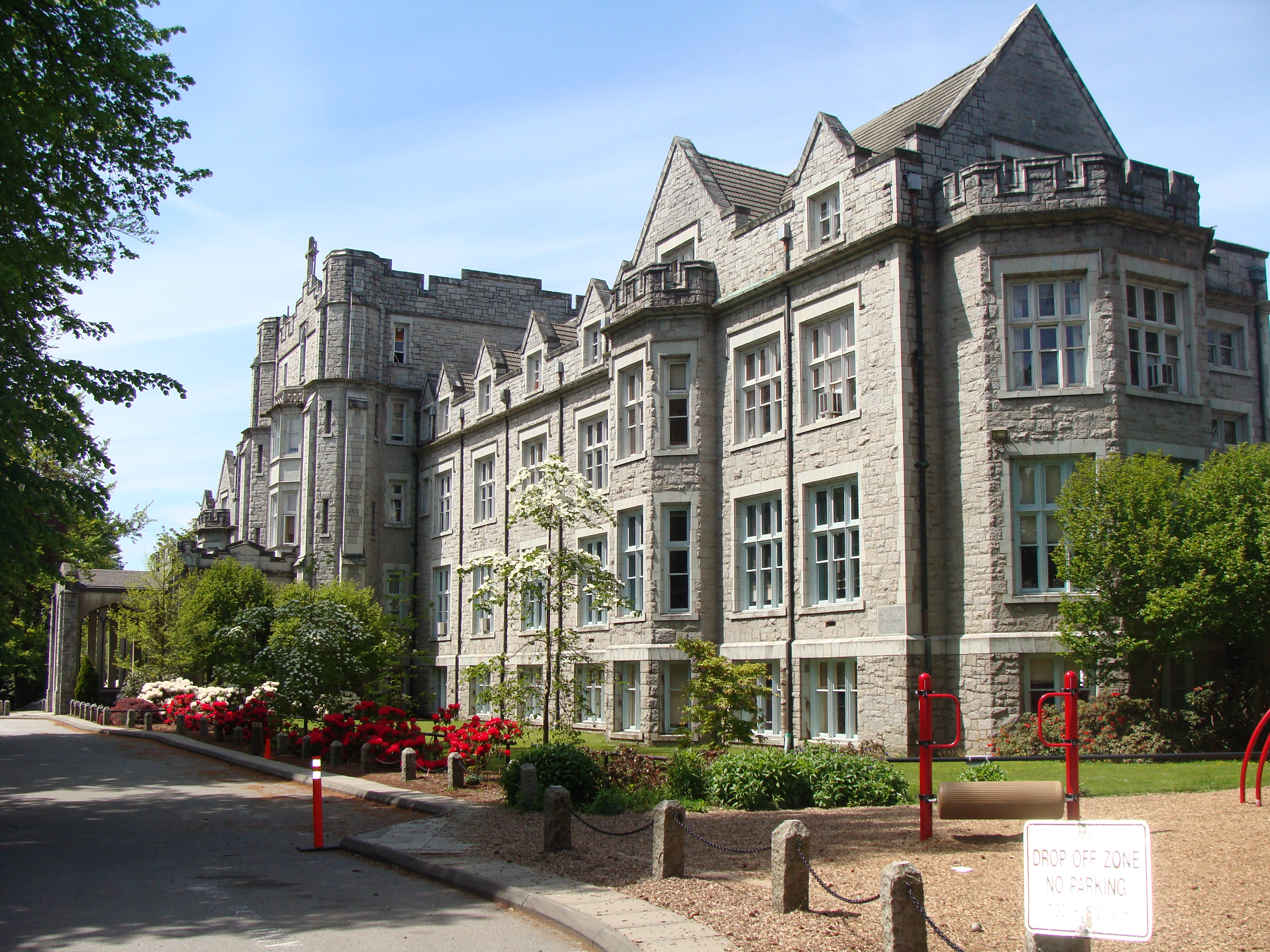
Side profile - east wing

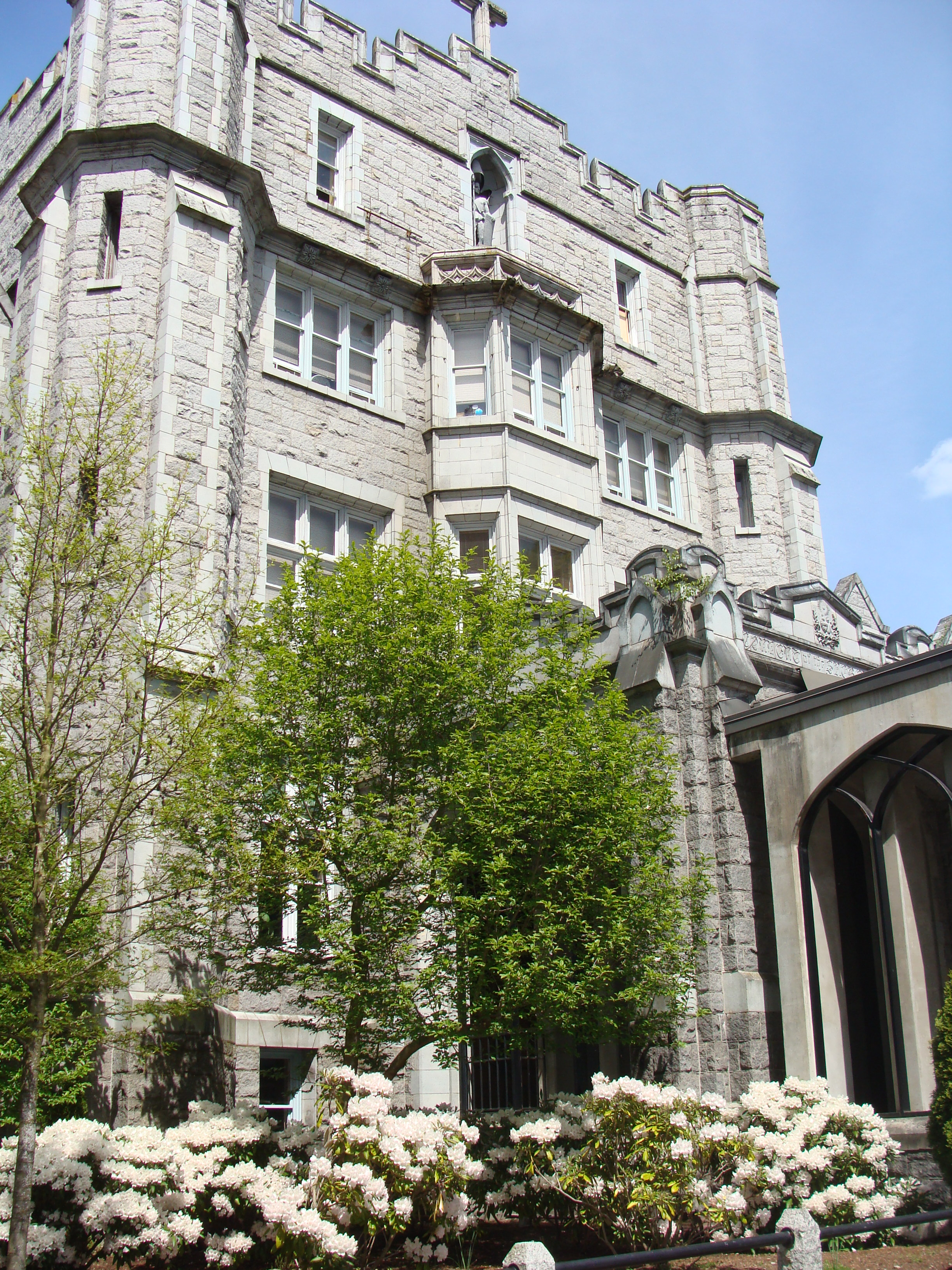
Main facade

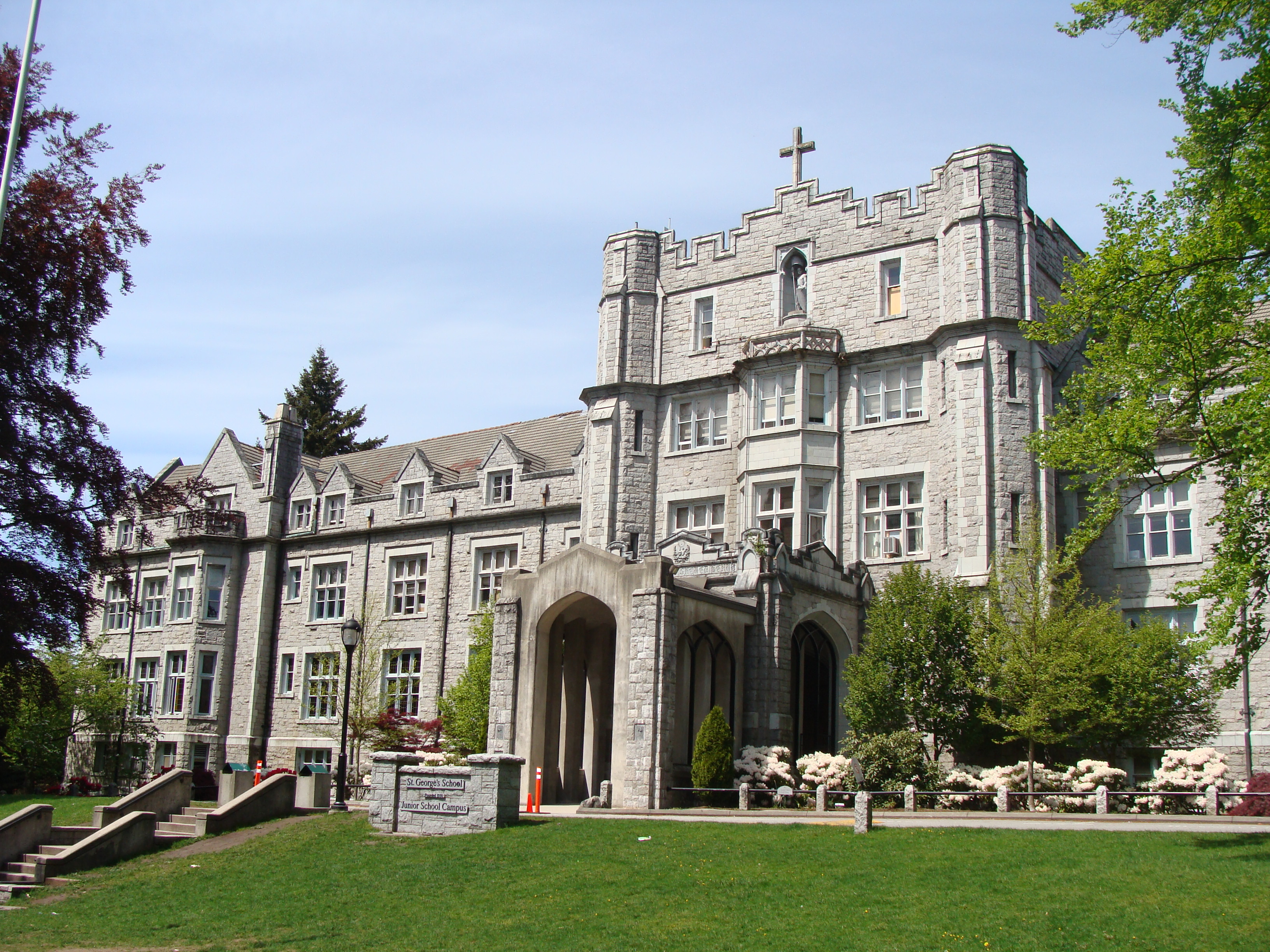
Main entrance - viewed from the street

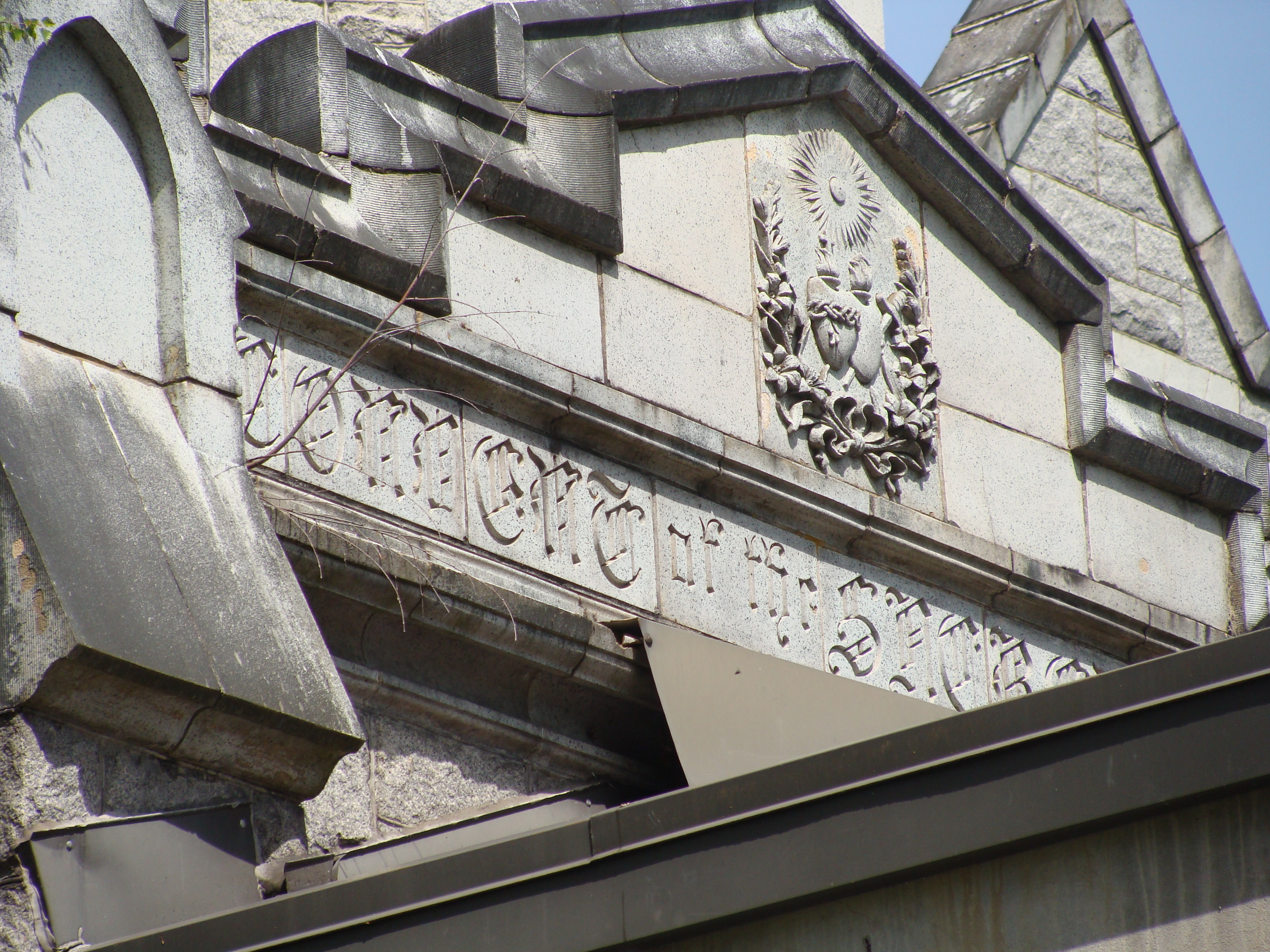
Original signage on original archway

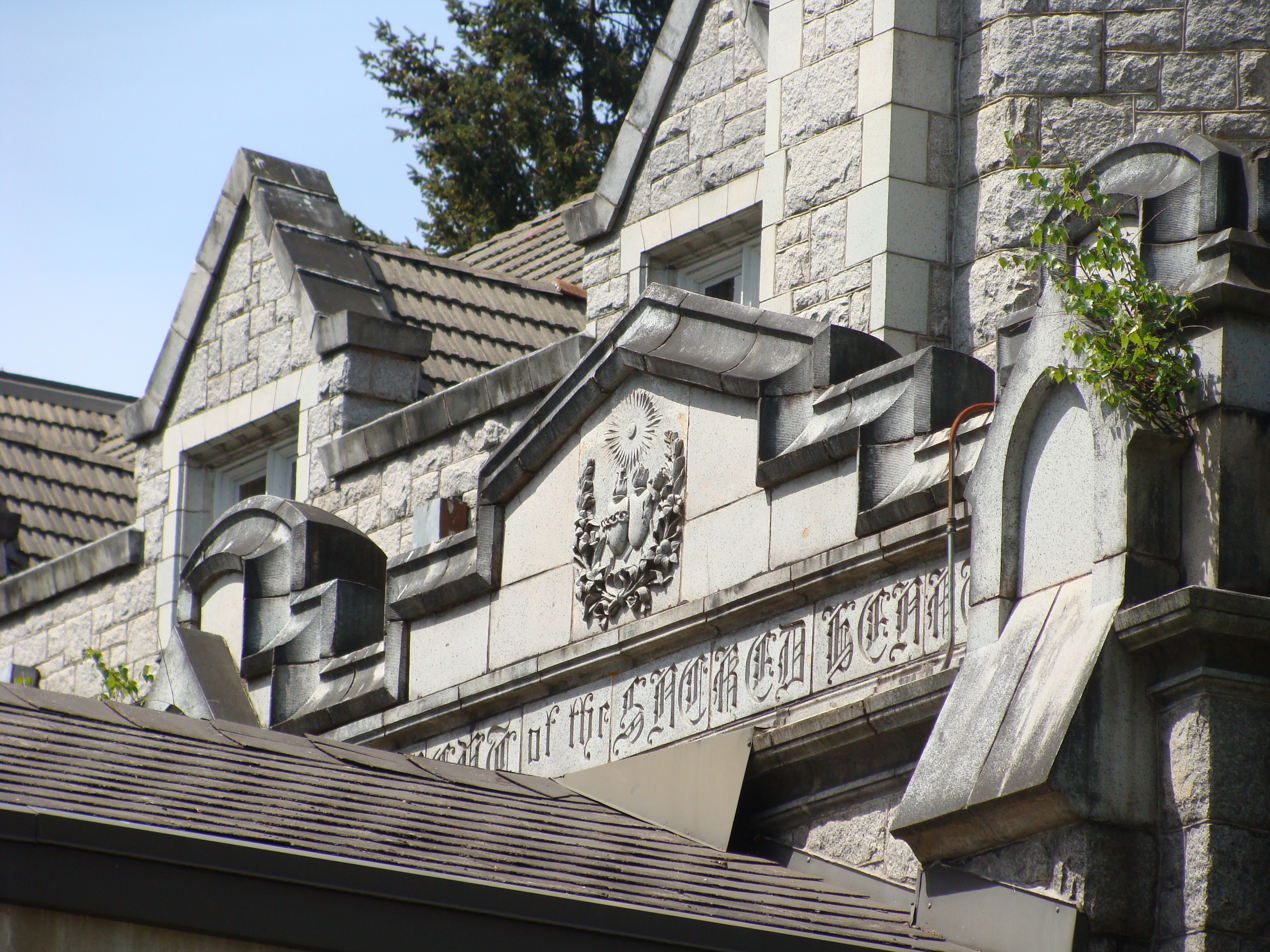
Original signage on original archway

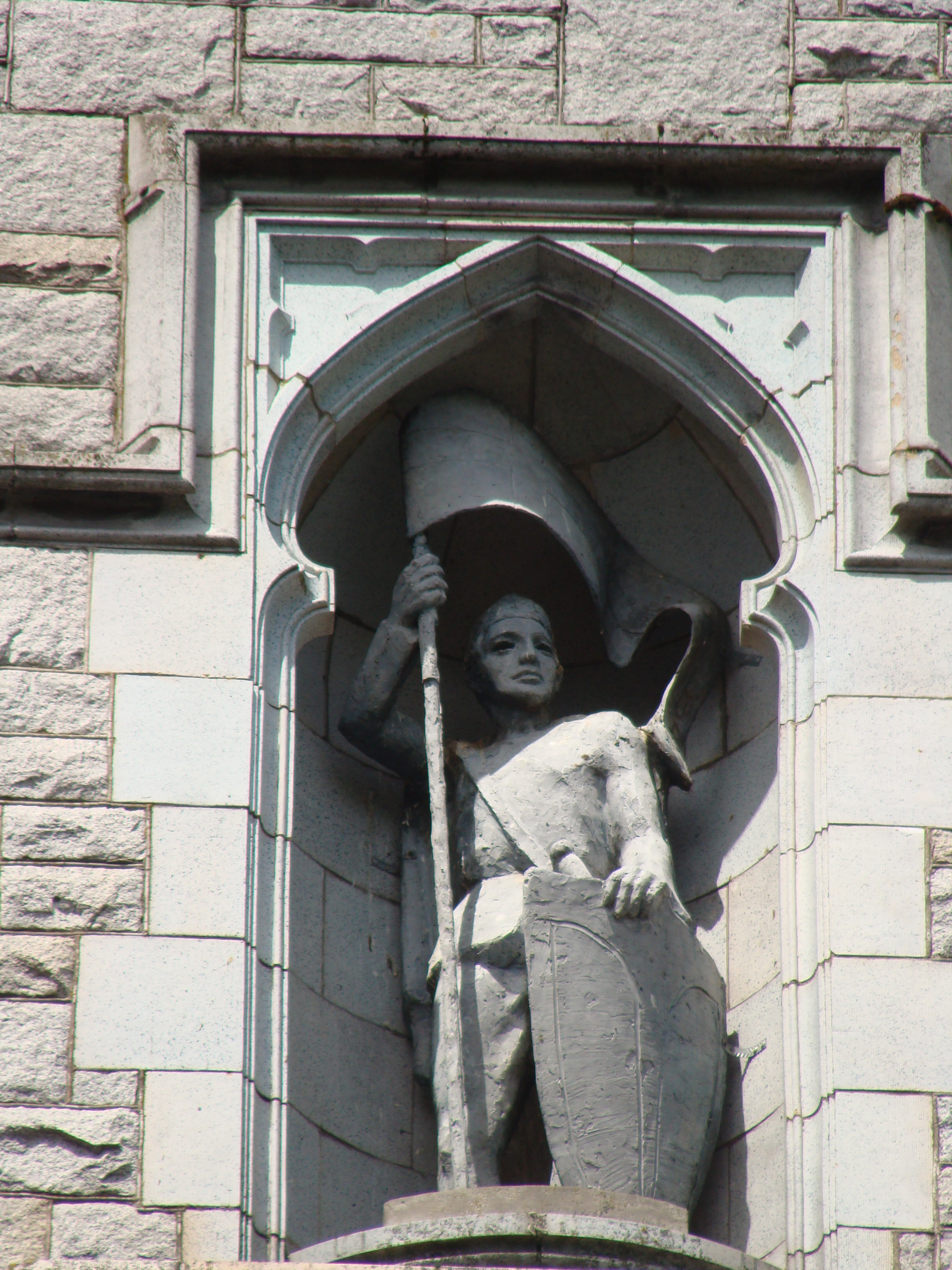
Crusader statue

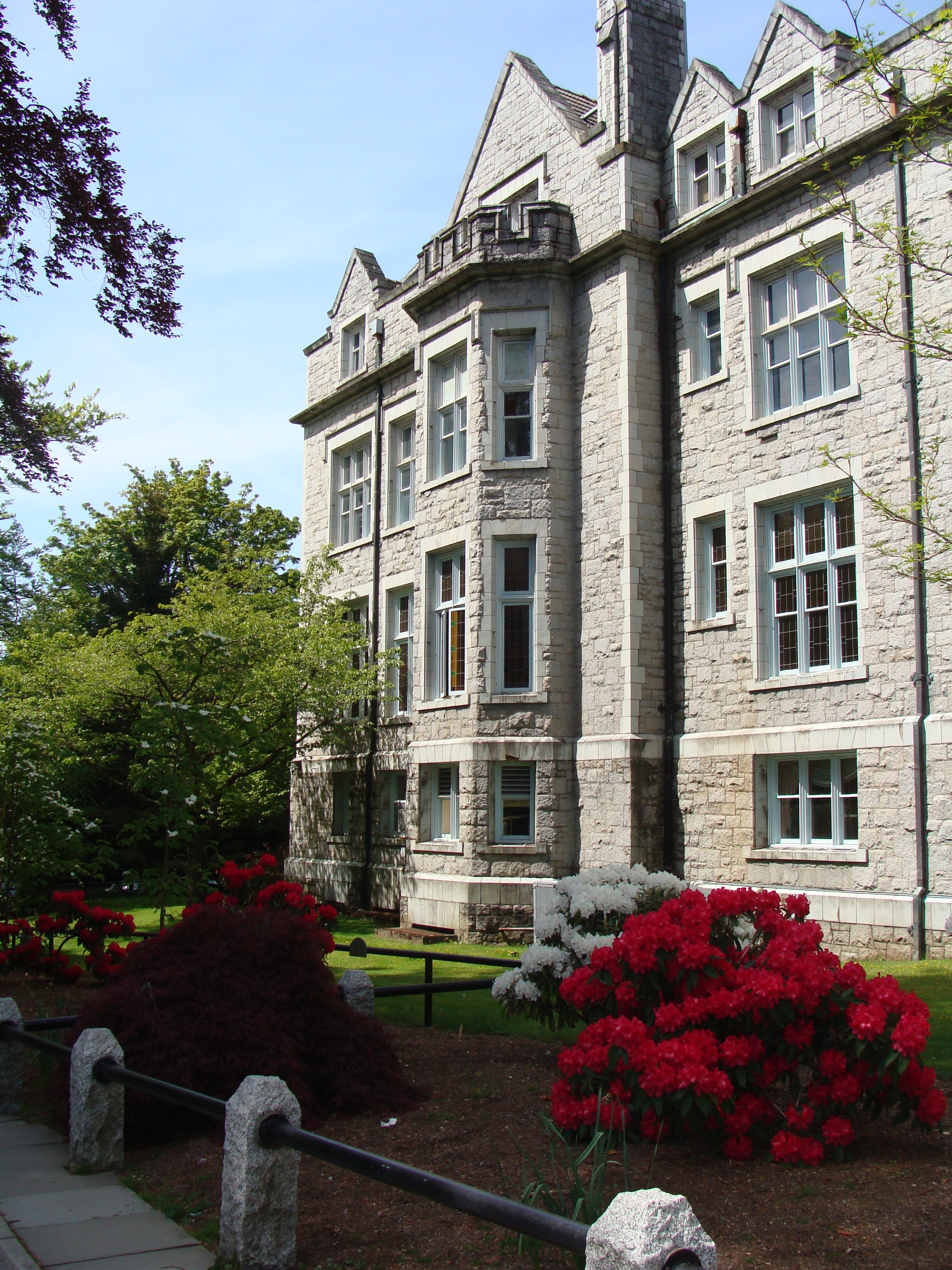
West wing

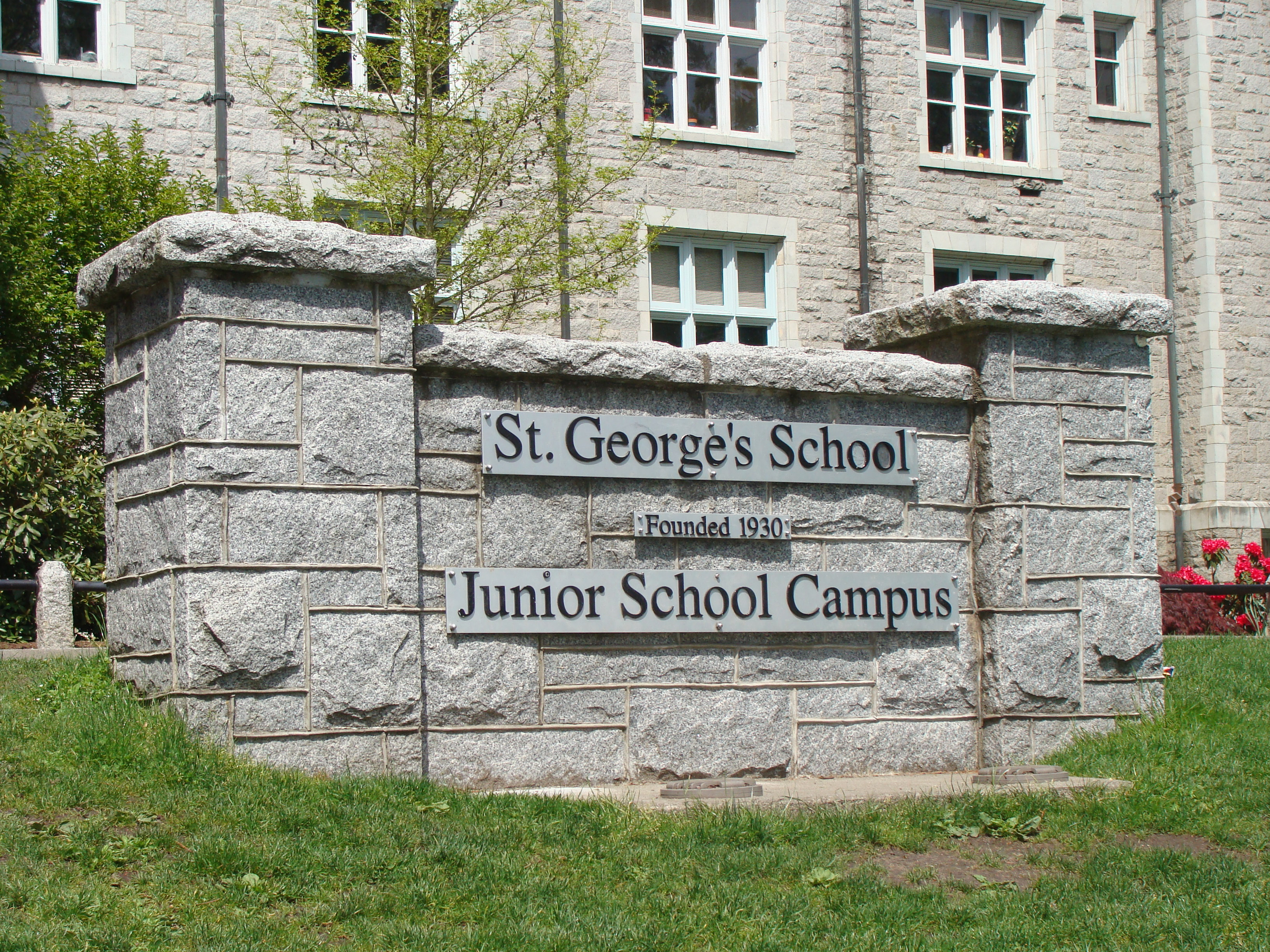
St. George' Junior School signage
