= Marine Building =

Art Deco building in Vancouver

Coordinates: 49°17′15″N 123°07′01″W

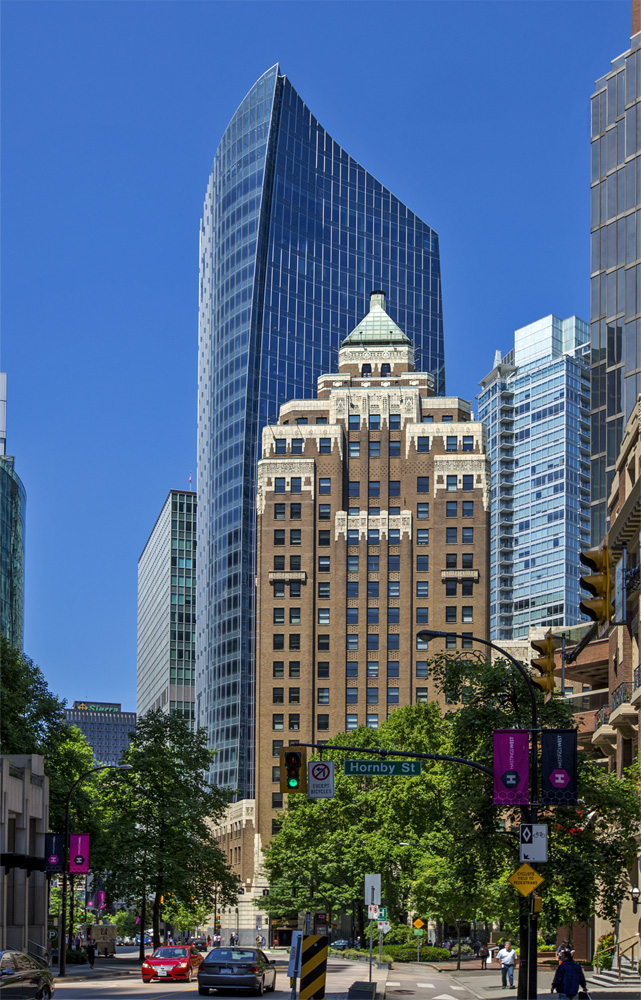
The Marine Building

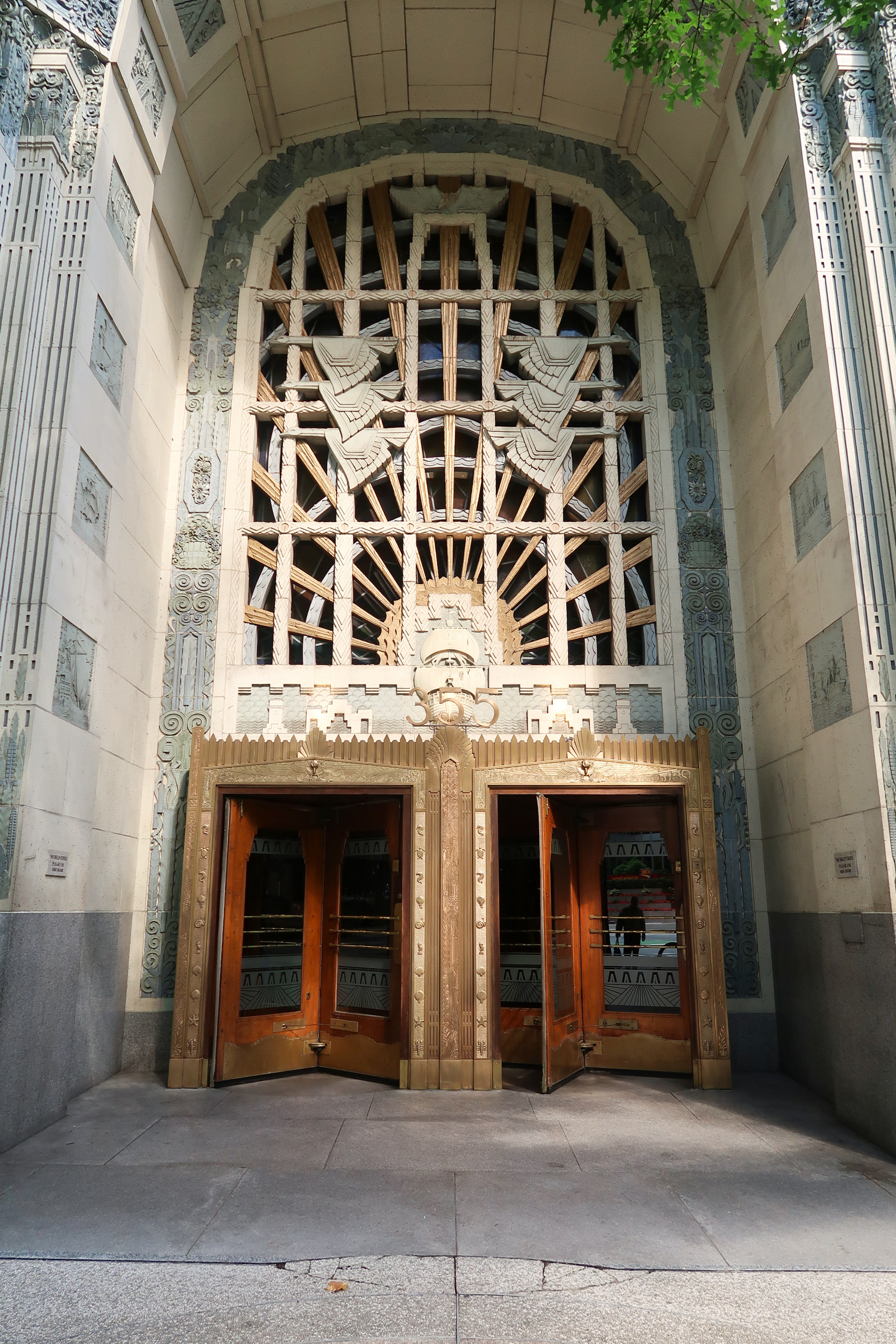
Marine Building, Burrard Street portal

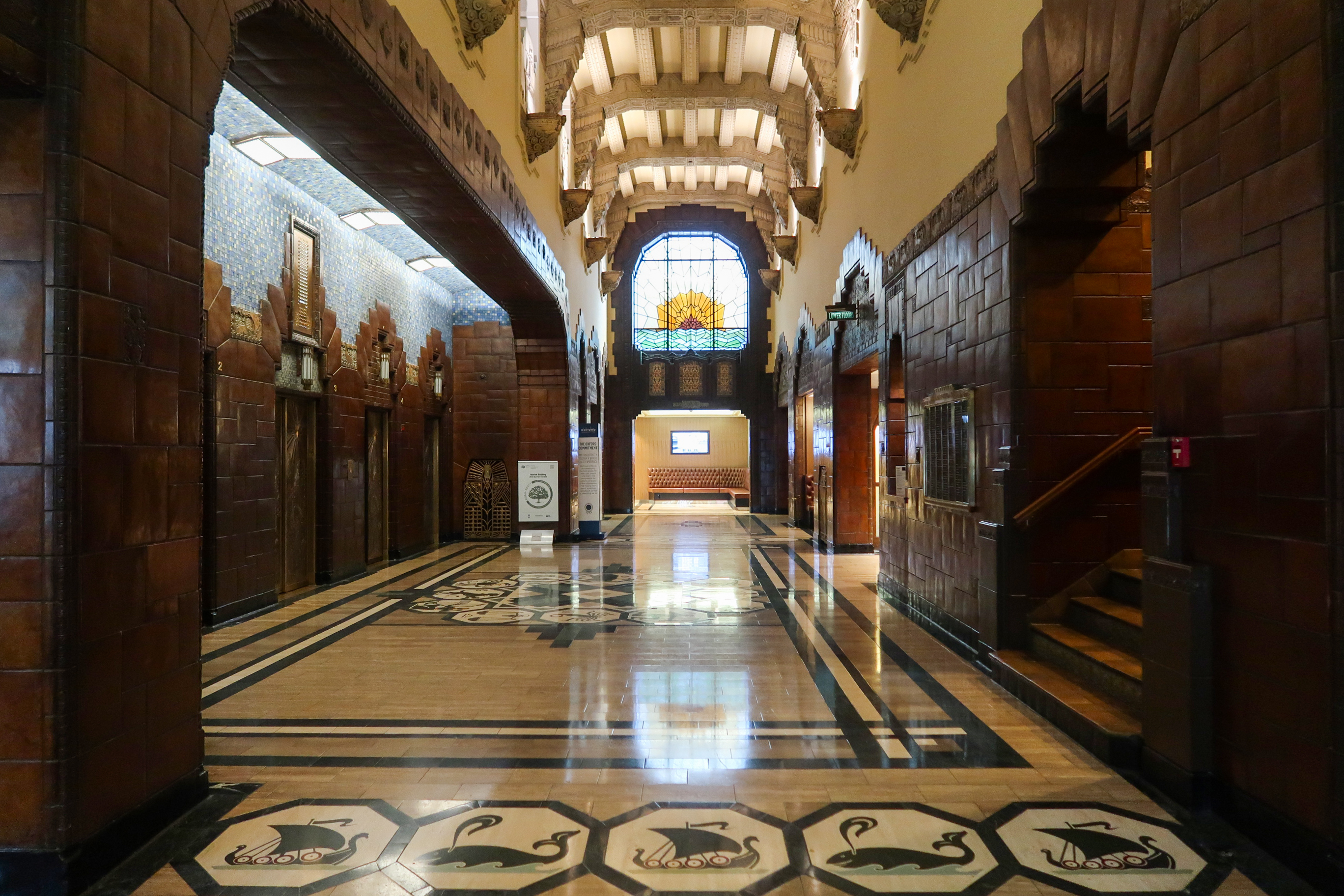
Lobby

The Marine Building is a skyscraper located at 355 Burrard Street in Downtown Vancouver, British Columbia, Canada near the Financial District. Completed in 1930, at the time of its opening it was the city's tallest skyscraper and it is listed among the best Art Deco buildings in the world. It owes its name to the plethora of fine marine-themed ornaments that decorate it. Because of its architecture and interior decorations, the building has been chosen as the setting of a number of film and television productions.

== History ==
The building was conceived by Lt. Commander J.W. Hobbs, an entrepreneur from Toronto. Hobbs recognized that the opening of the Panama Canal in 1914 would greatly increase Vancouver's importance as a commercial port, and decided that the city needed a grand building, in the vein of the newly constructed Chrysler Building in New York. The design was assigned to McCarter Nairne and Partners, who had never worked on the design of a skyscraper before. Construction started on March 13, 1929 as reported by a local newspaper:

Yesterday morning, His Worship Mayor W.H. Malkin blew a blast on a golden whistle and with it set in motion the steam shovel that will excavate the site for the new Burrard Street Marine skyscraper.

The building was completed on 7 October 1930. At 97.8 metres (321 ft) (22 floors) it was the tallest skyscraper in the city until 1939. According to the architects, McCarter & Nairne, the building was intended to evoke "some great crag rising from the sea, clinging with sea flora and fauna, tinted in sea-green, touched with gold." The building cost $2.3 million to build – $1.1 million over budget—but due to the Great Depression it was sold to the Guinness family of Ireland for only $900,000. The 2023 property assessment is $153 million.

There was an observation deck, but during the depression in the 1930s the 25-cent admission price proved unaffordable for most. Currently, there are no public galleries in the building.

Inside the massive brass-doored elevators the walls are inlaid with 12 varieties of local hardwoods. All over the walls and polished brass doors are depictions of sea snails, skate, crabs, turtles, carp, scallops, seaweed and sea horses, as well as the transportation means of the era. The floor presents the zodiac signs. The exterior is studded with flora and fauna, tinted in sea-green and touched with gold.

During a renovation from 1982-1989 to update the electrical, mechanical and air-conditioning systems, the "battleship linoleum" (imported from Scotland) in the lobby was replaced with marble. The former Merchant Exchange was also gutted, and is now a restaurant called Tractor Foods. This building was also the management centre for Oneworld, of one of the three largest airline alliances in the world, from its founding in May 2000 until it was relocated to New York City in June 2011.

== In popular culture ==
The building has often been used in filmmaking and television production. It was the setting for the final scene in the movie, Timecop and it was used as the headquarters of the Daily Planet in the popular television show Smallville and as the Freelancers headquarter in the TV show Continuum. The building was used in the movie Blade: Trinity. It stood in for the Baxter Building in New York City in 2005's Fantastic Four and its sequel, Fantastic Four: Rise of the Silver Surfer. The Netflix series Altered Carbon (2018) used the lobby as the home of a main character.

== Gallery ==
Marine Building in 1929.

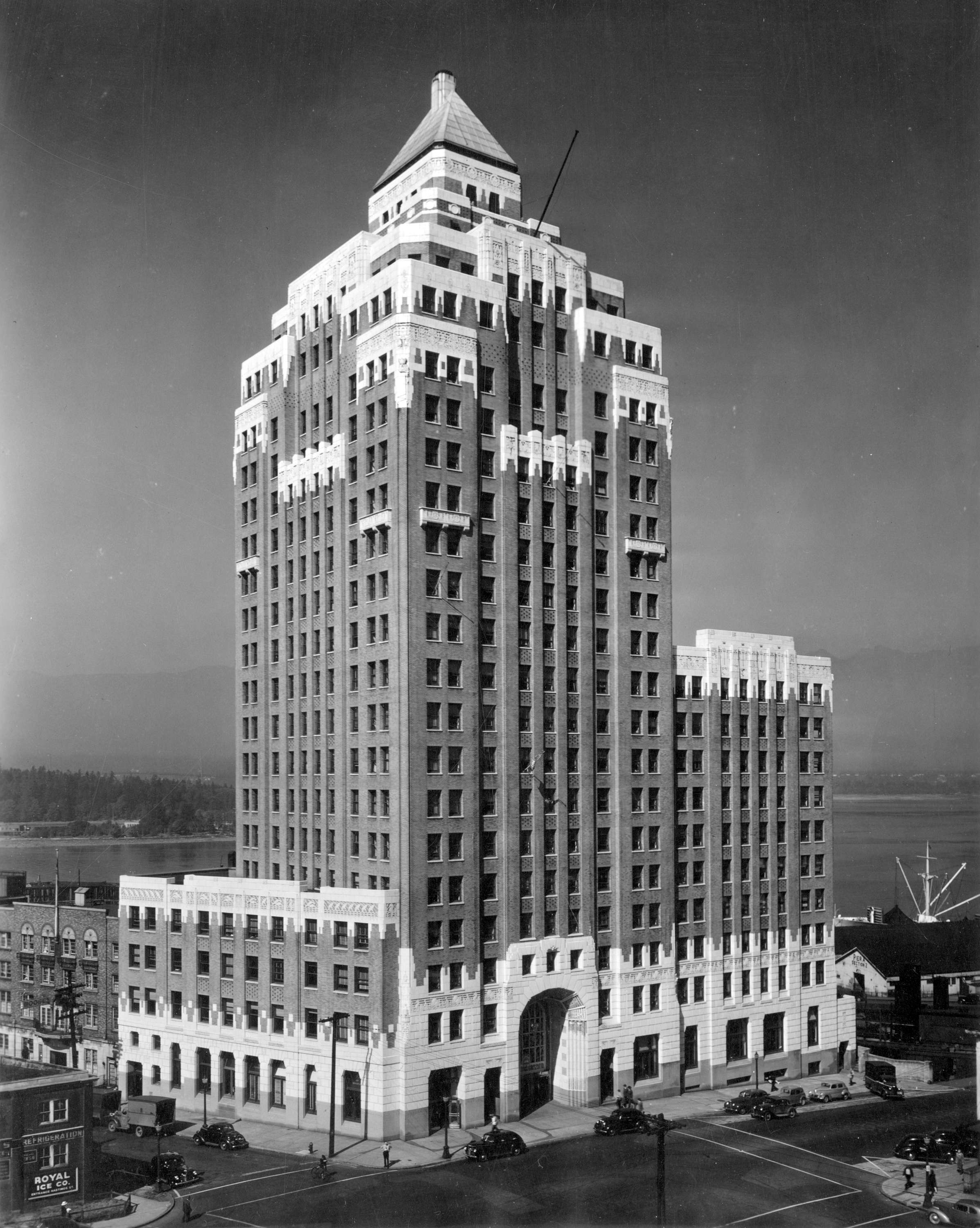
Marine Building in 1947.

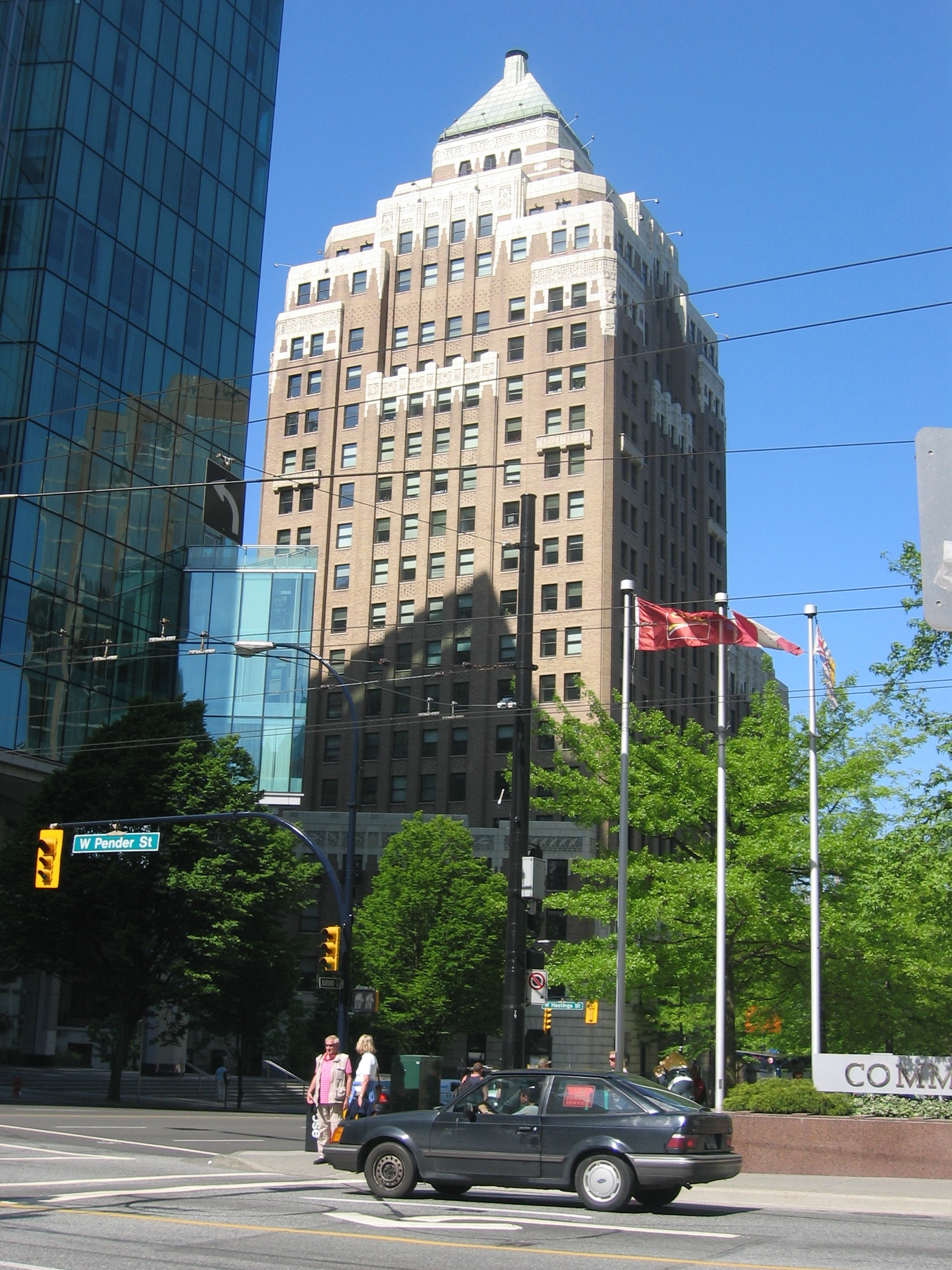
Marine Building in 2006, as seen from the intersection of Burrard and Pender Streets.

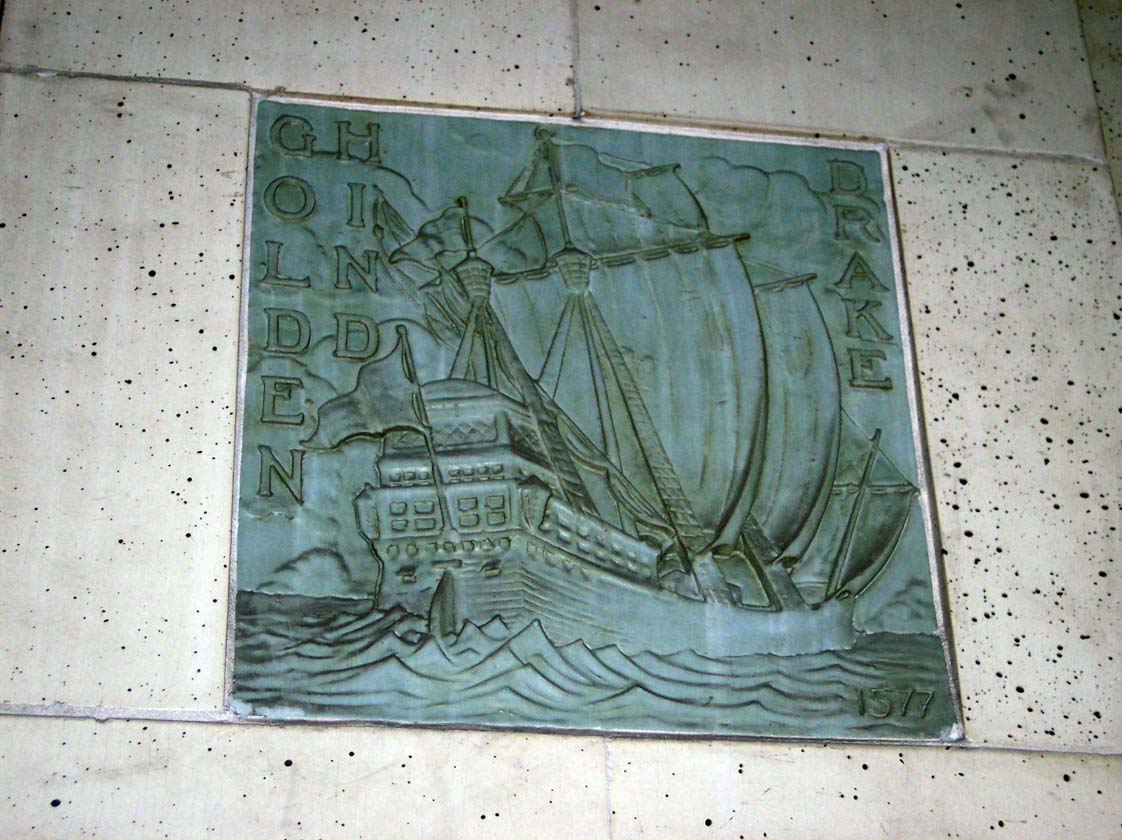
One of the tiles depicting maritime history.

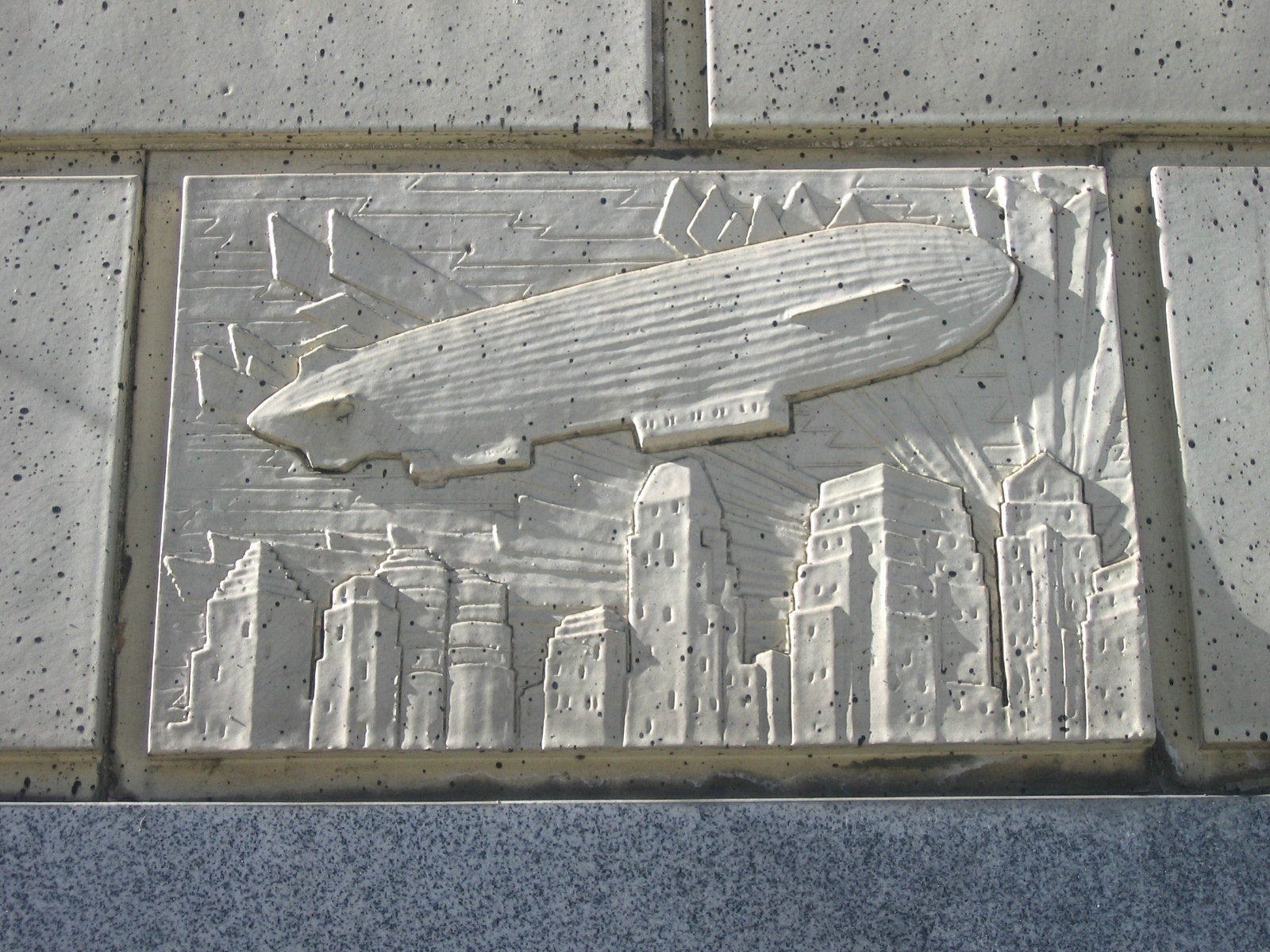
External wall depiction of zeppelin, transcontinental mode of flight at the time

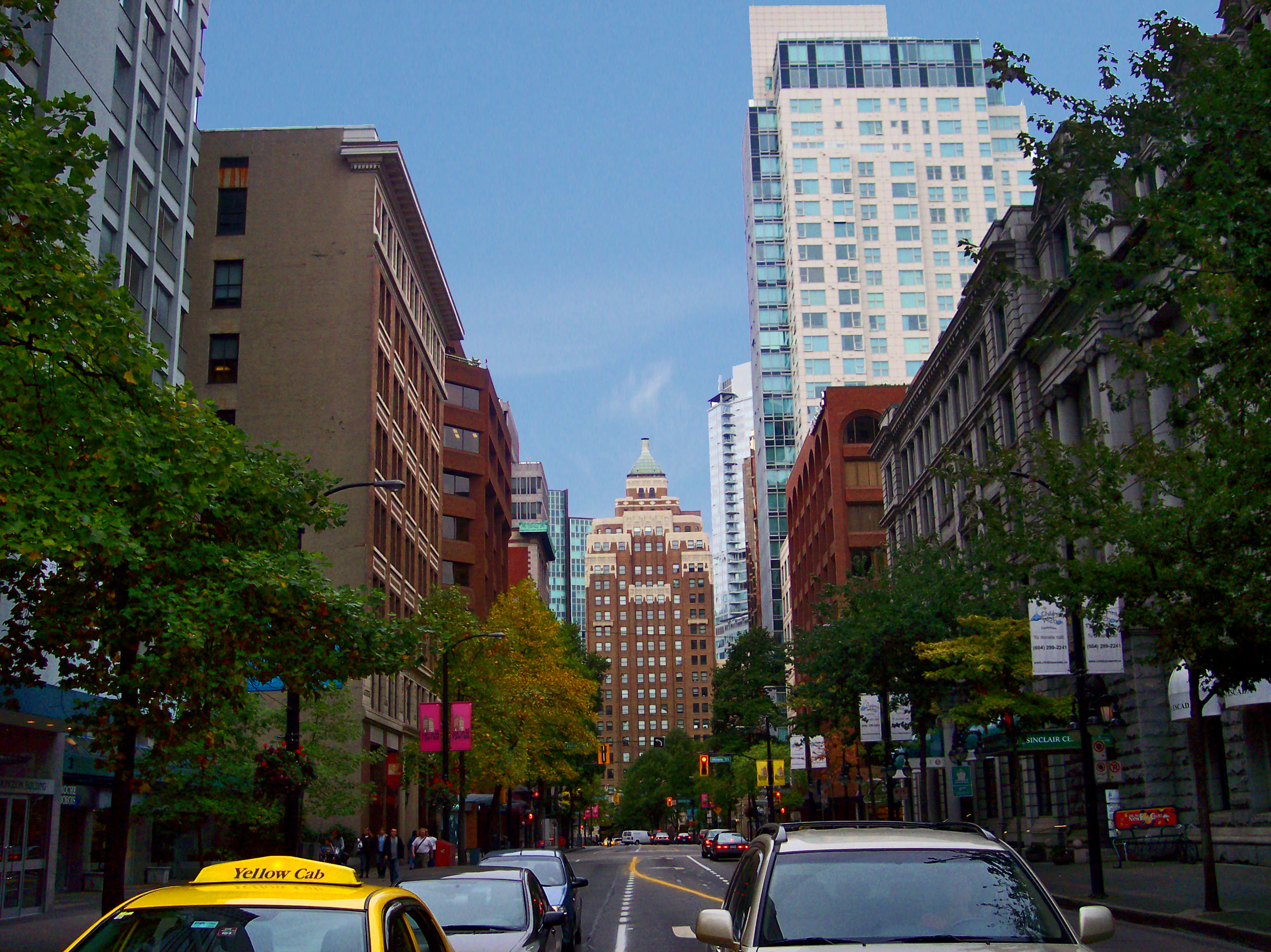
Marine Building from West Hastings Street

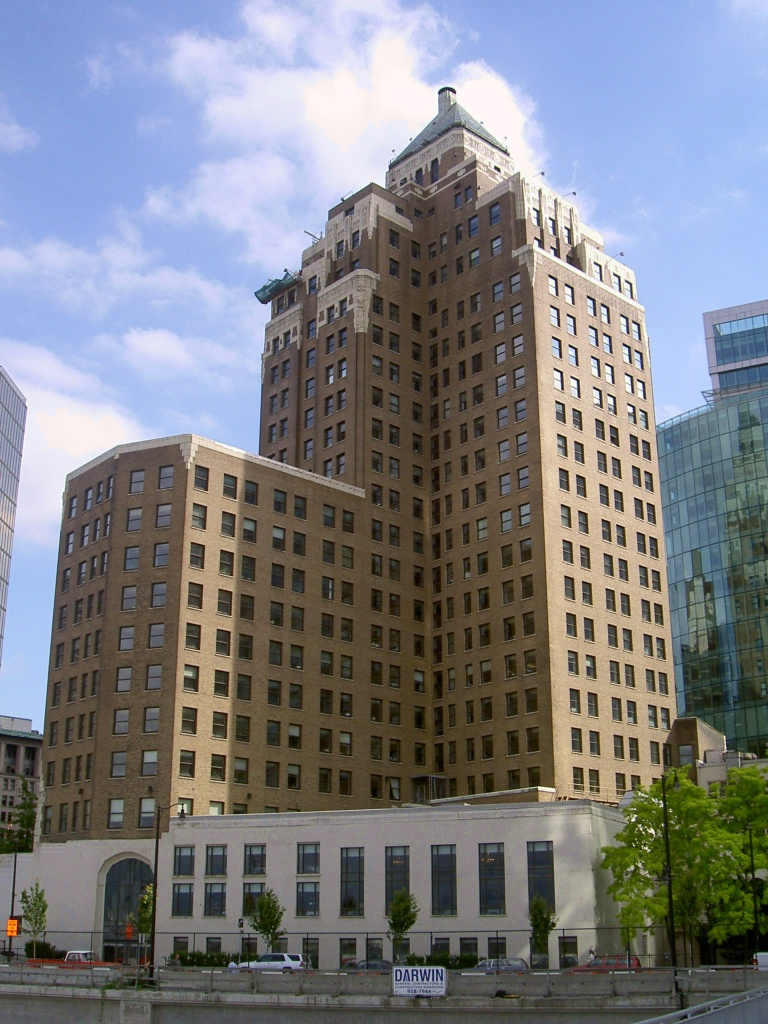
Rear of the building.

== See also ==
- List of heritage buildings in Vancouver
- List of old Canadian buildings
- List of tallest buildings in Vancouver
- Oneworld
