= City Square Shopping Centre =

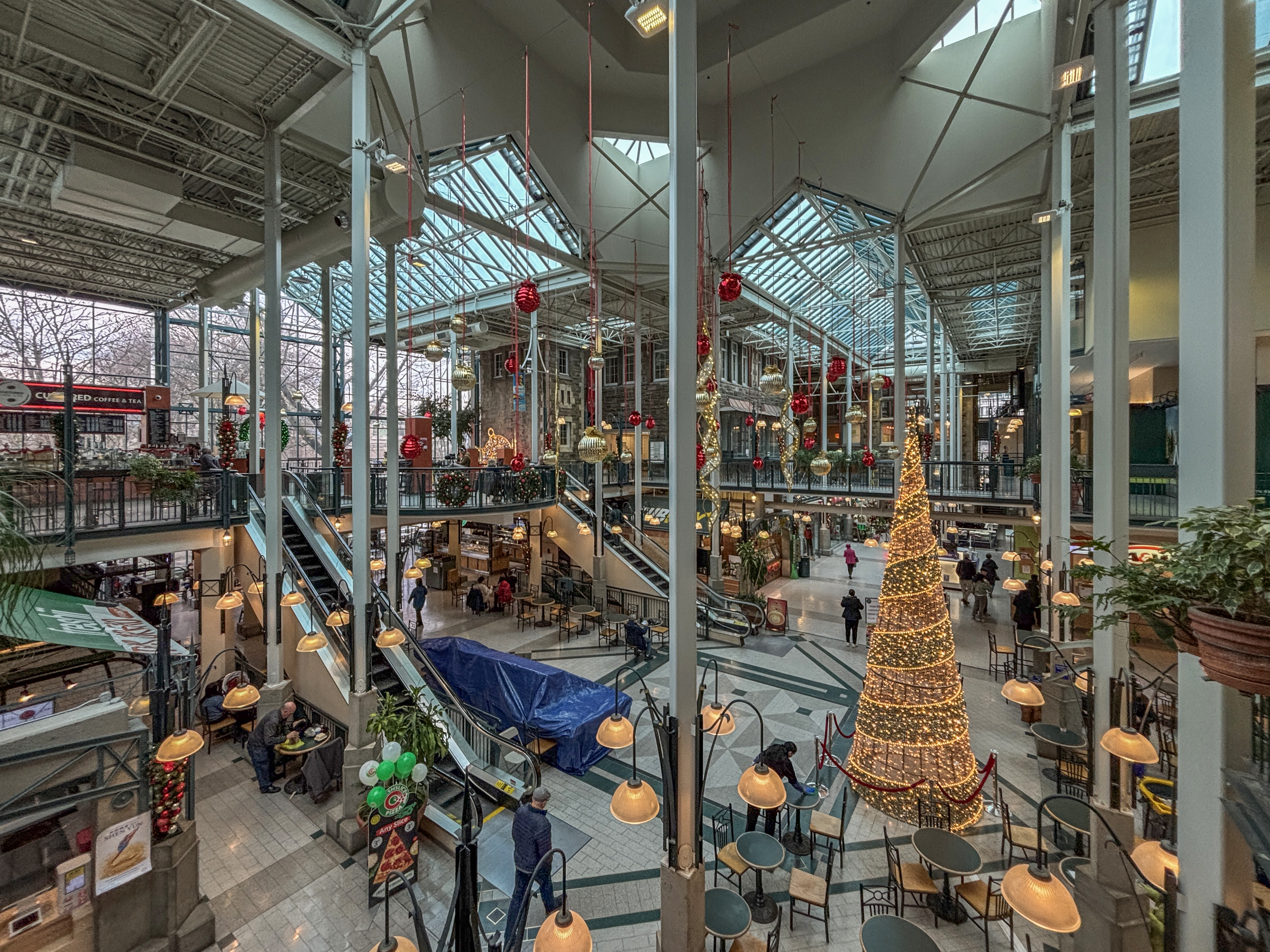
- Atrium of the mall in 2024
- Location: Vancouver, British Columbia, Canada
- Coordinates: 49.26087°N 123.11635°W
- Opened: August 16, 1989; 37 years ago
- Architect: Paul Merrick Architects
- Num. of stores: 45
- Num. of anchor tenants: 4 (3 open, 1 vacant)
- Floors: 2
- Parking: 3 levels of underground parking
- Website: www.citysquarevan.com

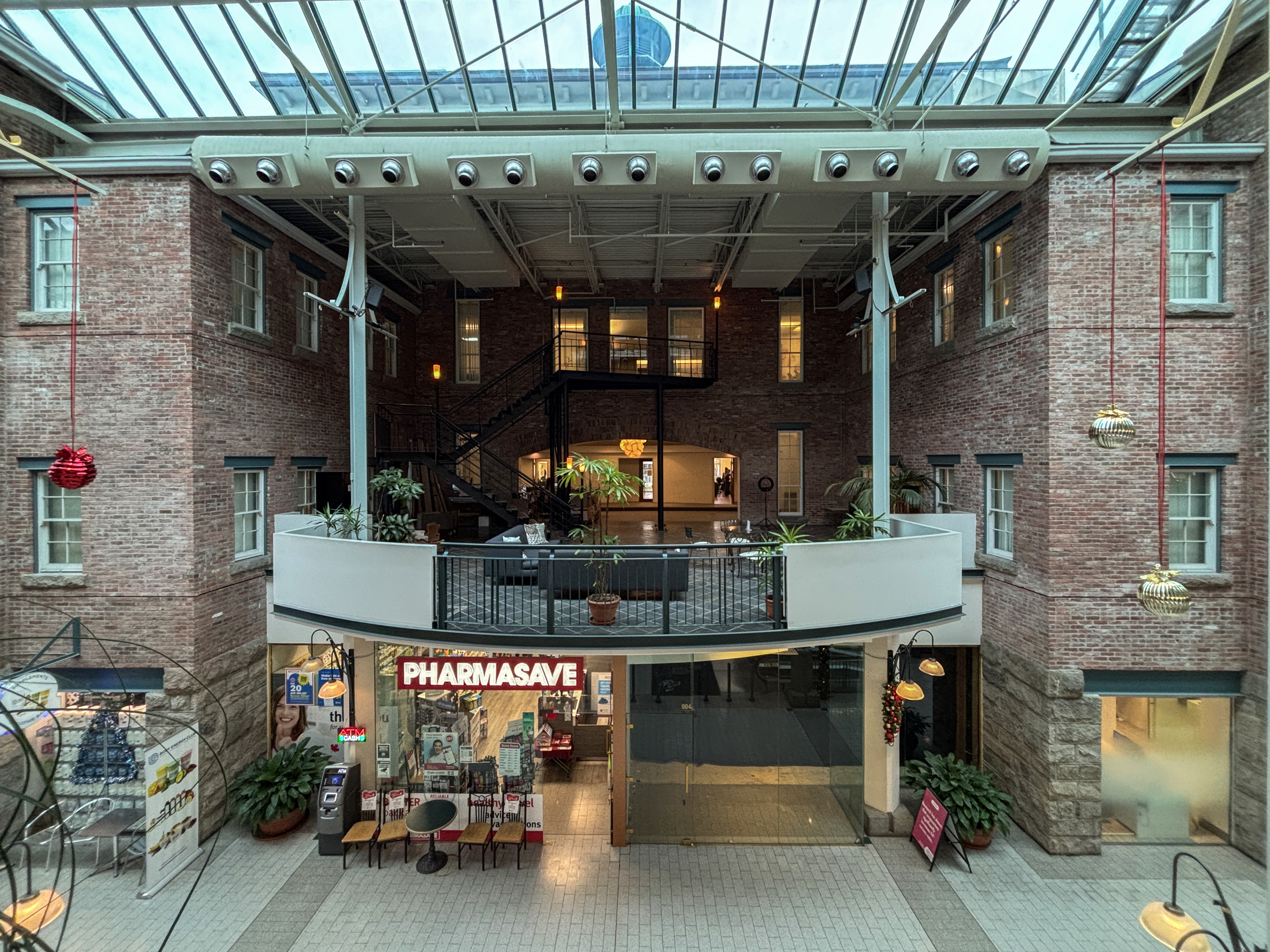
1905 Model School building

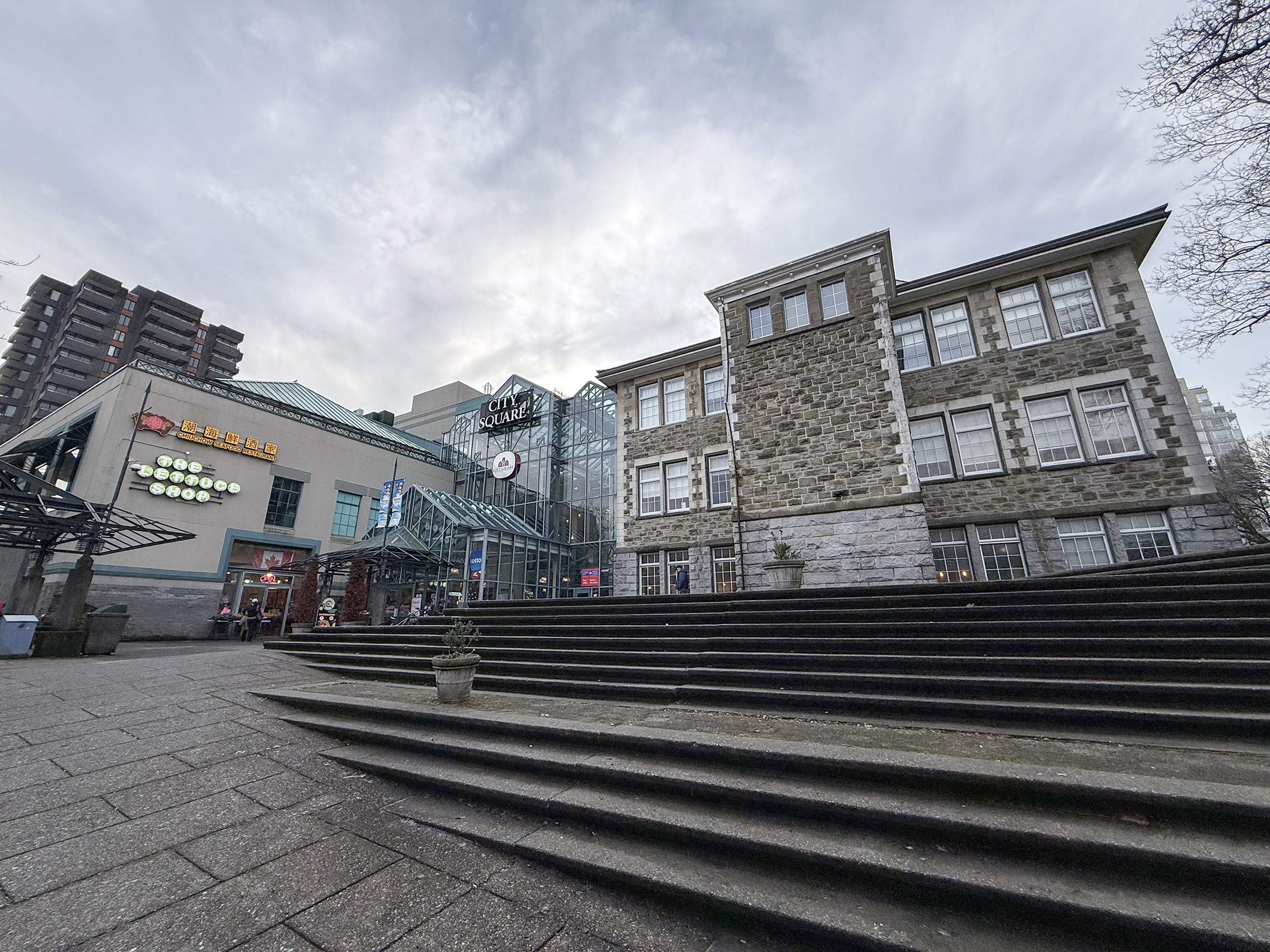
Exterior of 1908 Normal School building

City Square Shopping Centre is a mall across the street from City Hall in Vancouver, British Columbia, Canada. It is located in the heart of the heritage district of central Vancouver, on the northwest corner of 12th Avenue and Cambie Street.

City Square Shopping Mall and office complex was inaugurated in 1989 and is an example of adaptive reuse of heritage buildings.

== History ==
Unique to Vancouver, City Square's shopping mall and office complex is a mix of modern and heritage architecture. The heritage portions of the complex were built in 1905 and 1908 to house the Model School and Normal School, respectively. Graduates from the Teacher's Training Program applied their skills, norms (hence the name "Normal School") and educational theories at the Normal School to gain practical experience. In 1986 the City of Vancouver designated both school buildings as municipal heritage sites, saving them from demolition.

== City Square today ==
On the retail level, the shopping mall offers over 50 shops and professional services, including medical and dental offices, and a food court.

== See also ==
- List of heritage buildings in Vancouver
