= Fred Townley =

Canadian architect (1887–1966)

- Born: 1887; Winnipeg, Manitoba
- Died: 1966 (aged 78–79); Vancouver, British Columbia
- Education: University of British Columbia; McGill School of Architecture
- Occupation: Architect
- Buildings: Vancouver City Hall; Vancouver General Hospital; Vancouver Stock Exchange; Point Grey Secondary School; CNIB Building; Great Northern Railway station Capitol Theatre

Frederick L. Townley (1887–1966), was a Canadian architect whose most notable works included Vancouver City Hall, the Great Northern Railway station (destroyed), the Capitol Theatre, Vancouver General Hospital, the Vancouver Stock Exchange Building, Point Grey Secondary School and the CNIB Building.

Townley was born in Winnipeg, Manitoba and grew up in Vancouver, British Columbia, and was the son of Vancouver Mayor Thomas Owen Townley. Townley graduated from University of Pennsylvania's architecture department in 1911. In 1919, Townley and Robert M. Matheson opened up a local architectural firm. Townley carried out most of the design work while Matheson managed the business. When their project of City Hall was nearing completion in 1935, Matheson died due to illness at age 48. In 1941, their office was built at 1376 Hornby Street. in 1966, Townley died after designing over a thousand buildings almost exclusively in Vancouver, British Columbia, Canada.
