= Sylvia Hotel =

Historic hotel in Vancouver, BC

Coordinates: 49.288684°N 123.142390°W

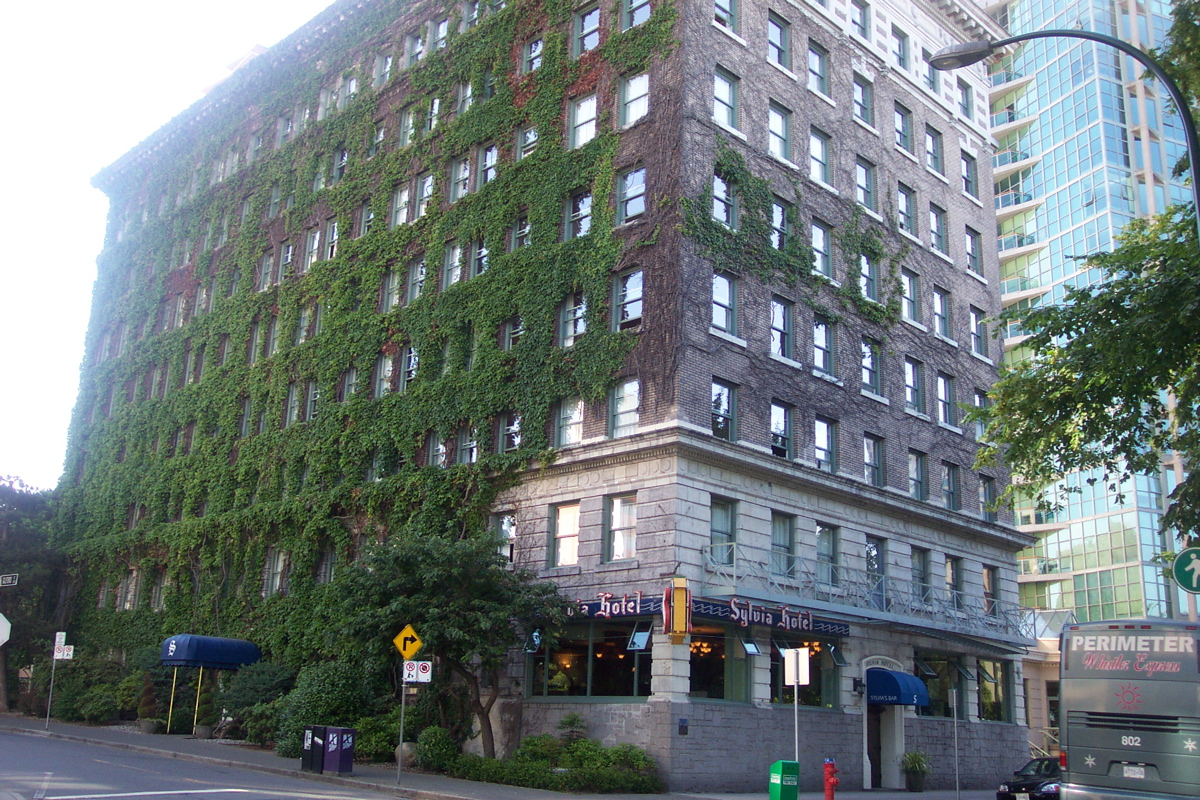
Taken from Beach Ave at Gilford St, the Sylvia Hotel in the summer

The Sylvia Hotel is a historic Vancouver, British Columbia, Canada landmark. Located at 1154 Gilford Street on English Bay near Stanley Park. Constructed in 1912, the Sylvia was designed as an apartment building by Mr. W.P. White, a Seattle architect. It was built by Booker, Campbell and Whipple Construction Company for a Mr. Goldstein, who had a daughter named Sylvia. During the Depression the Sylvia Court Apartments fell on hard times, and in 1936 the building was converted into an apartment hotel. With the advent of World War II, many of the suites were converted to rooms, to provide accommodation for crews of the merchant marine.

After the war the number of permanent residents in the hotel gradually decreased, until by the sixties the Sylvia had become a completely transient full-service hotel. In 1954 it opened the first cocktail bar in Vancouver. Until 1958 the Sylvia Hotel was the tallest building in the West End – a well-known landmark, its brick and terracotta extension softened by the Boston Ivy that now completely covers the Gilford Street side of the hotel. Until superseded by the West-End building boom of the 1960s, the hotel restaurant's slogan was "Dine in the Sky".

In 1975 the Sylvia was designated by the City of Vancouver as a "heritage building", thereby ensuring its survival for many years to come.

The famous Sylvia Hotel cat, "Mr. Got To Go", has inspired three popular children's books by Lois Simmie and illustrated by Cynthia Nugent. They are engaging tales of the stray cat who arrived at the Sylvia Hotel one day, took control of the premises and decided to check in permanently. A feline resident – possibly the same cat – is mentioned in a song about the hotel by American folk singer-songwriter Cheryl Wheeler.

== Sylvia Ablowitz ==
Sylvia Goldstein, (later Ablowitz) spent her childhood in the West End. A strong swimmer, she sometimes practised in English Bay and once won a race between the bay and Kitsilano Beach. (Later, she would attract the attention of her future husband, Harry Ablowitz, by diving into False Creek from a boat carrying Jewish singles on an outing.) After Sylvia completed a degree at the University of British Columbia, her family moved to Los Angeles, where she worked for a labour union. She returned to Vancouver in 1928, and met Harry, marrying him within a year and settling in North Vancouver. Together, they founded a realty company.

Sylvia and her husband were very committed to Jewish seniors. Sylvia worked with Jewish community groups, and she and Harry helped set up a rest home and hospital, now in operation for nearly 60 years. In her 90s, Sylvia was still volunteering for a telephone home-check program to help out other senior Jews. She died on April 12, 2002, at the University of British Columbia Hospital.

== See also ==
- List of heritage buildings in Vancouver
