= Coastal Church =

Historic church edifice in Vancouver, British Columbia

Coordinates: 49.2864°N 123.1248°W

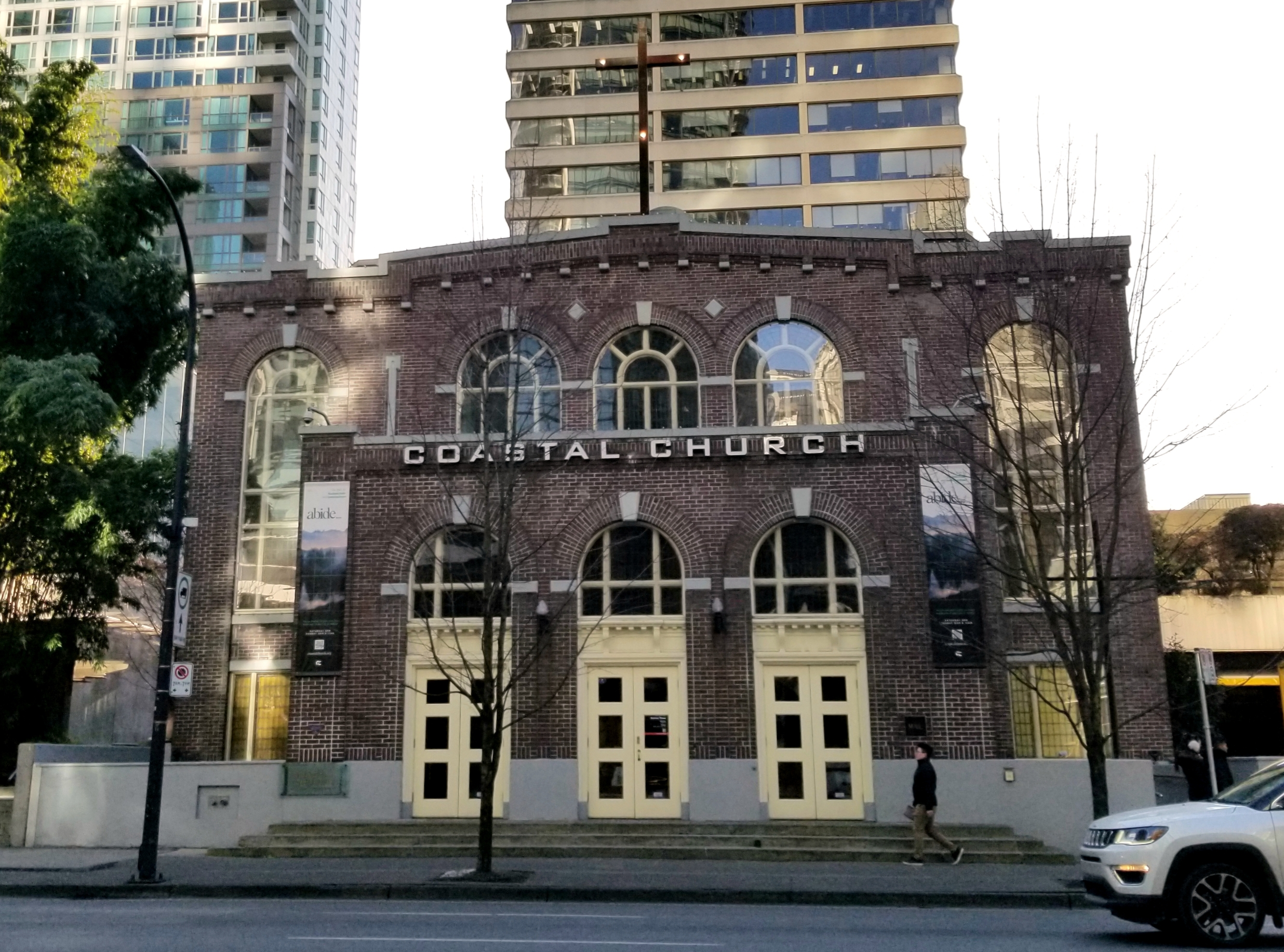
- The Coastal Church in 2025
- Interactive map of the Coastal Church area

General information
- Architectural style: Colonial Revival
- Location: 1160 Georgia Street, Vancouver, British Columbia, Canada
- Construction started: July 1918
- Completed: 1919

Technical details
- Structural system: 2-storey, with basement, brick

Design and construction
- Architects: Matheson and De Guerre

National Historic Site of Canada
- Designated: December 10, 2003
- Reference no.: 11022

The Coastal Church is a historic church edifice located at 1160 Georgia Street in the west end of Vancouver, British Columbia, Canada. It was designed in the Colonial Revival style by the noted Vancouver architectural firm of Matheson and De Guerre. Constructed between 1918 and 1919, it is a two-storey brick building with a basement. It was originally the Vancouver branch of the First Church of Christ, Scientist, which sold the building in 2002 to the Coastal Church. It was added to the Canadian Register of Historic Places on December 10, 2003, and designated a local heritage site by the municipal government on December 20.
