= Mt. Pleasant Presbyterian Church =

- U.S. National Register of Historic Places
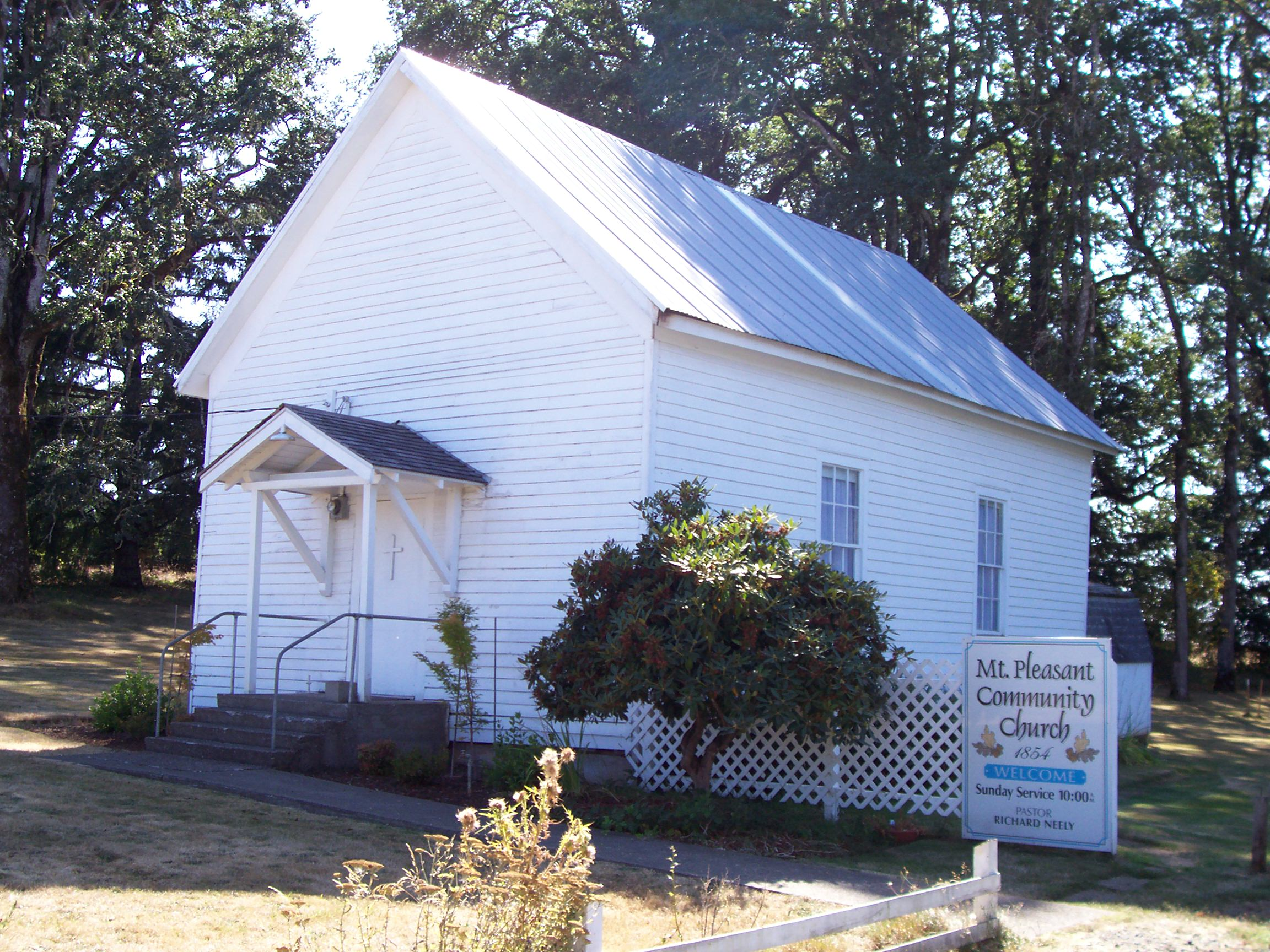

- Location within Oregon Location within the United States
- Nearest city: Stayton, Oregon
- Coordinates: 44°45′31″N 122°44′38″W
- Built: 1856
- NRHP reference No.: 74001694
- Added to NRHP: January 24, 1974

The Mt. Pleasant Presbyterian Church, known as Christian Church at Mt. Pleasant or Mt. Pleasant Community Church, was built in 1854 near Stayton, Oregon. It was listed on the National Register of Historic Places in 1974 for its architecture.

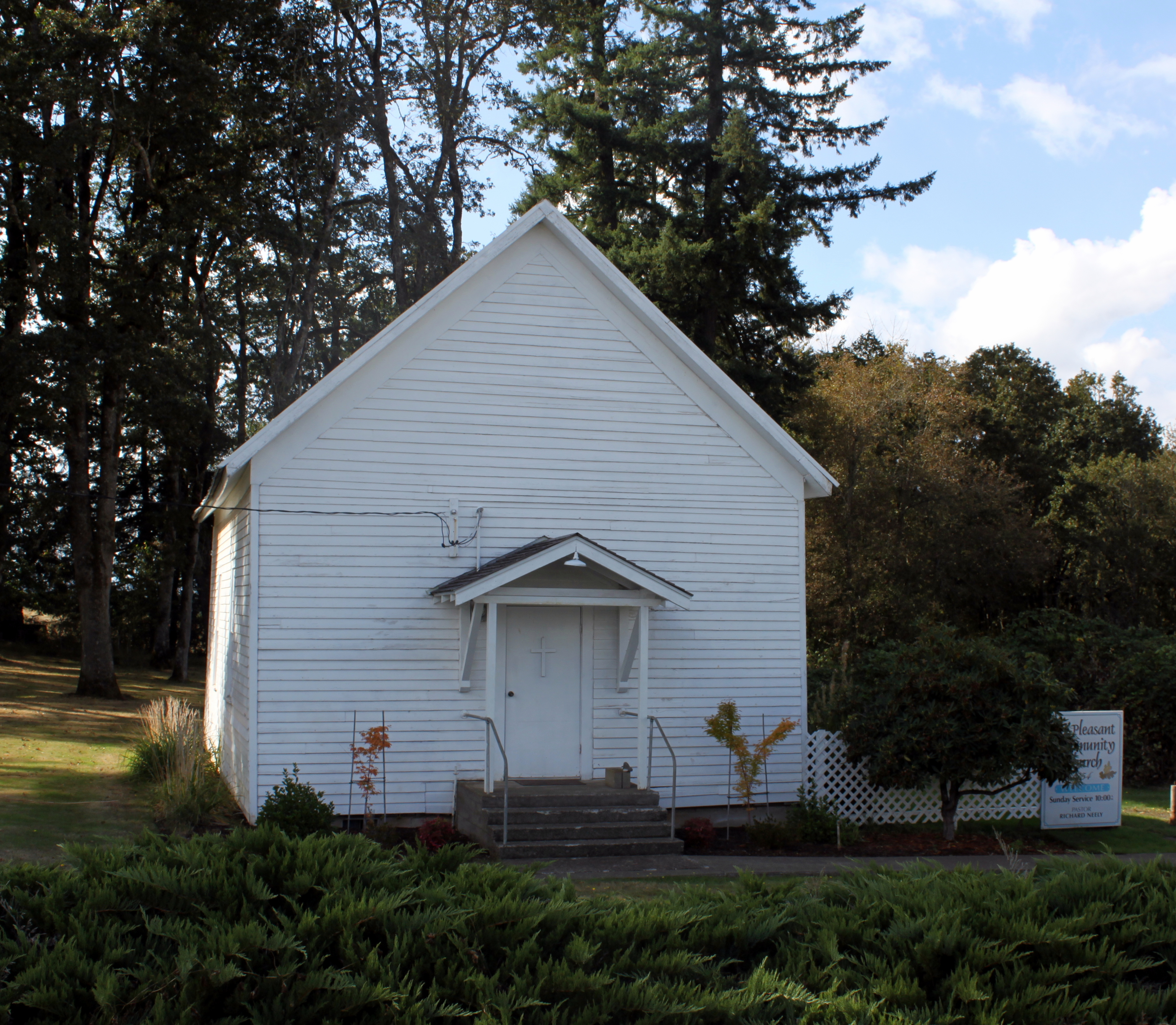
Stayton is in Marion County but the church is located across the Santiam River in Linn County.

It was built on land donated by Washington Crabtree. The church experienced some conflict between two groups that utilized it:

In its early years, the church served alternately as a meeting place for the Cumberland Presbyterian and Christian groups. Benjamin Franklin Irvine belonged to the former sect and Crabtree to the latter. The church's denomination depended upon which of the men secured the minister. Services also were held in the buiLding whenever a circuit rider or evangelist traveled through the neighborhood. At one time a division between the "sprinkling" and "total immersion" groups became so heated that Crabtree, on whose land the building stood, is reported to have kept the church filled with hay for two years. A reconciliation was finally reached and the church reopened.
