= List of historic places in Vancouver =

The following list includes all of the Canadian Register of Historic Places listings in Vancouver, British Columbia.

Name	Address	Coordinates	Government recognition (CRHP №)	Wikidata ID	Image
102 Powell Street	100 Powell Street; Vancouver BC	49°16′59″N 123°06′07″W	Vancouver municipality (7881)		
1050 Nicola Street	1050 Nicola Street; Vancouver BC	49°17′09″N 123°08′06″W	Vancouver municipality (10865)		Upload Photo
106 West Hastings Street	106 West Hastings Street; Vancouver BC	49°16′54″N 123°06′29″W	Vancouver municipality (8625)		
1062 Richards Street	1062 Richards Street; Vancouver BC	49°16′38″N 123°07′19″W	Vancouver municipality (11388)		Upload Photo
108 West Hastings Street	108 West Hastings Street; Vancouver BC	49°16′54″N 123°06′29″W	Vancouver municipality (8620)		
1080 Richards Street	1080 Richards Street; Vancouver BC	49°16′37″N 123°07′19″W	Vancouver municipality (11286)		Upload Photo
111 East Pender Street	111 East Pender Street; Vancouver BC	49°16′51″N 123°06′07″W	Vancouver municipality (7770)		
112 West Hastings Street	112 West Hastings Street; Vancouver BC	49°16′54″N 123°06′29″W	Vancouver municipality (8621)		
116 West Hastings Street	116 West Hastings Street; Vancouver BC	49°16′54″N 123°06′29″W	Vancouver municipality (8622)		
118 Alexander Street	118 Alexander Street; Vancouver BC	49°17′02″N 123°06′07″W	Vancouver municipality (7949)		
120 Powell Street	120 Powell Street; Vancouver BC	49°16′59″N 123°06′07″W	Vancouver municipality (7882)		
123 East Hastings Street	123 East Hastings Street; Vancouver BC	49°16′54″N 123°06′04″W	Vancouver municipality (8283)		
1245 Harwood Street	1245 Harwood Street; Vancouver BC	49°16′52″N 123°08′10″W	Vancouver municipality (11017)		Upload Photo
127 East Pender Street	127 East Pender Street; Vancouver BC	49°16′51″N 123°06′04″W	Vancouver municipality (7801)		
135 East Pender Street	135 East Pender Street; Vancouver BC	49°16′51″N 123°06′04″W	Vancouver municipality (7795)		Upload Photo
1356 West 13th Avenue	1356 West 13th Avenue; Vancouver BC	49°15′34″N 123°08′06″W	Vancouver municipality (10827)		Upload Photo
1386 Thurlow Street	1386 Thurlow Street; Vancouver BC	49°16′42″N 123°08′02″W	Vancouver municipality (10666)		
1390 Thurlow Street	1390 Thurlow Street; Vancouver BC	49°16′42″N 123°08′02″W	Vancouver municipality (10667)		
141 East Pender Street	141 East Pender Street; Vancouver BC	49°16′51″N 123°06′04″W	Vancouver municipality (10623)		
144-146 Alexander Street	118 Alexander Street; Vancouver BC	49°17′01″N 123°06′04″W	Vancouver municipality (7950)		Upload Photo
150 West Hastings Street	150 West Hastings Street; Vancouver BC	49°16′55″N 123°06′32″W	Vancouver municipality (8680)		
1504 Graveley Street	1504 Graveley Street; Vancouver BC	49°16′13″N 123°04′23″W	Vancouver municipality (11019)		Upload Photo
151 West Hastings Street	151 West Hastings Street; Vancouver BC	49°16′57″N 123°06′32″W	Vancouver municipality (8682)		
152 West Hastings Street	152 West Hastings Street; Vancouver BC	49°16′55″N 123°06′32″W	Vancouver municipality (8681)		
157 Alexander Street	157 Alexander Street; Vancouver BC	49°17′03″N 123°06′00″W	Vancouver municipality (7862)		
1628 Marpole Avenue	1628 Marpole Avenue; Vancouver BC	49°15′19″N 123°08′28″W	Vancouver municipality (10669)		
163 East Hastings Street	163 East Hastings Street; Vancouver BC	49°16′54″N 123°06′04″W	Vancouver municipality (8287)		Upload Photo
166 East Pender Street	166 East Pender Street; Vancouver BC	49°16′49″N 123°06′04″W	Vancouver municipality (7804)		
169 East Hastings Street	169 East Hastings; Vancouver BC	49°16′54″N 123°06′04″W	Vancouver municipality (8288)		Upload Photo
191 Alexander Street	191 Alexander Street; Vancouver BC	49°17′03″N 123°06′00″W	Vancouver municipality (7863)		
1927 West 17th Avenue	1927 West 17th Avenue; Vancouver BC	49°15′23″N 123°08′56″W	Vancouver municipality (10668)		Upload Photo
200 East Pender Street	200 East Pender Street; Vancouver BC	49°16′49″N 123°05′56″W	Vancouver municipality (10624)		
21 East Hastings Street	21 East Hastings Street; Vancouver BC	49°16′54″N 123°06′14″W	Vancouver municipality (8269)		Upload Photo
212 East 38th Avenue	212 East 38th Avenue; Vancouver BC	49°14′10″N 123°06′04″W	Vancouver municipality (10665)		
218 Keefer Street	218 Keefer Street; Vancouver BC	49°16′45″N 123°05′56″W	Vancouver municipality (2746)		
230-248 Jackson Avenue	230-248 Jackson Avenue; Vancouver BC	49°16′57″N 123°05′35″W	Vancouver municipality (11255)		Upload Photo
231 East Pender Street	231 East Pender Street; Vancouver BC	49°16′50″N 123°05′56″W	Vancouver municipality (7791)		
252 East Georgia Street	252 East Georgia Street; Vancouver BC	49°16′42″N 123°05′53″W	Vancouver municipality (2742)		
27 Alexander Street	27 Alexander Street; Vancouver BC	49°17′01″N 123°06′11″W	Vancouver municipality (10744)		
27 East Pender Street	27 East Pender Street; Vancouver BC	49°16′51″N 123°06′14″W	Vancouver municipality (7834)		
291 East Georgia Street	291 East Georgia Street; Vancouver BC	49°16′43″N 123°05′49″W	Vancouver municipality (7891)		Upload Photo
304 West 6th Avenue	304 West 6th Avenue; Vancouver BC	49°15′56″N 123°06′40″W	Vancouver municipality (10696)		Upload Photo
310 West Cordova Street	310 West Cordova Street; Vancouver BC	49°17′01″N 123°06′36″W	Vancouver municipality (8564)		
314-316 West Cordova Street	314-316 West Cordova Street; Vancouver BC	49°17′01″N 123°06′36″W	Vancouver municipality (8565)		
320 West Cordova Street	320 West Cordova Street; Vancouver BC	49°17′01″N 123°06′36″W	Vancouver municipality (8567)		
325 Carrall Street	325 Carrall Street; Vancouver BC	49°16′55″N 123°06′18″W	Vancouver municipality (8272)		Upload Photo
34 Powell Street	34 Powell Street; Vancouver BC	49°16′59″N 123°06′11″W	Vancouver municipality (7876)		
41 Alexander Street	41 Alexander Street; Vancouver BC	49°17′01″N 123°06′11″W	Vancouver municipality (2813)		
42 East Cordova Street	42 East Cordova Street; Vancouver BC	49°16′56″N 123°06′11″W	Vancouver municipality (7901)		Upload Photo
445 Gore Avenue	445 Gore Avenue; Vancouver BC	49°16′50″N 123°05′53″W	Vancouver municipality (2743)		
488 Carrall Street	488 Carrall Street; Vancouver BC	49°16′51″N 123°06′14″W	Vancouver municipality (2810)		Upload Photo
5 West Hastings Street	5 West Hastings Street; Vancouver BC	49°16′55″N 123°06′18″W	Vancouver municipality (8616)		
50 East Cordova Street	50 East Cordova Street; Vancouver BC	49°16′56″N 123°06′11″W	Vancouver municipality (7902)		
509 Carrall Street	509 Carrall Street; Vancouver BC	49°16′49″N 123°06′18″W	Vancouver municipality (7899)		Upload Photo
511 Union Street	511 Union Street; Vancouver BC	49°16′39″N 123°05′35″W	Vancouver municipality (10963)		
52 Powell Street	52 Powell Street; Vancouver BC	49°16′59″N 123°06′11″W	Vancouver municipality (7877)		
53 West Hastings Street	53 West Hastings Street; Vancouver BC	49°16′55″N 123°06′23″W	Vancouver municipality (8619)		
54 East Cordova Street	54 East Cordova Street; Vancouver BC	49°16′56″N 123°06′11″W	Vancouver municipality (7903)		
Grand Trunk Pacific Hotel	55 Powell Street; Vancouver BC	49°17′01″N 123°06′11″W	Vancouver municipality (7892)		
550 Beatty Street	550 Beatty Street; Vancouver BC	49°16′49″N 123°06′32″W	Vancouver municipality (7722)		
56 Powell Street	56 Powell Street; Vancouver BC	49°16′59″N 123°06′11″W	Vancouver municipality (7878)		
560 Beatty Street	560 Beatty Street; Vancouver BC	49°16′48″N 123°06′36″W	Vancouver municipality (7731)		Upload Photo
564 Beatty Street	564 Beatty Street; Vancouver BC	49°17′N 123°07′W	Vancouver municipality (7732)		Upload Photo
58 Powell Street	58 Powell Street; Vancouver BC	49°16′59″N 123°06′11″W	Vancouver municipality (7879)		
596 West 18th Avenue	596 West 18th Avenue; Vancouver BC	49°15′18″N 123°07′05″W	Vancouver municipality (10694)		Upload Photo
633 East Hastings Street	633 East Hastings Street; Vancouver BC	49°16′53″N 123°05′28″W	Vancouver municipality (8512)		
7 West Hastings Street	7 West Hastings Street; Vancouver BC	49°16′55″N 123°06′18″W	Vancouver municipality (8617)		
80 East Pender Street	80 East Pender Street; Vancouver BC	49°16′49″N 123°06′11″W	Vancouver municipality (7837)		
827-863 Hamilton Street	827-863 Hamilton Street; Vancouver BC	49°16′43″N 123°07′01″W	Vancouver municipality (11161)		
A. MacDonald and Company Building	40 Powell Street; Vancouver BC	49°16′59″N 123°06′11″W	Vancouver municipality (2257)		
Abrams Block	212 Carrall Street; Vancouver BC	49°16′58″N 123°06′14″W	Vancouver municipality (2512)		
Afton Hotel	249 East Hastings Street; Vancouver BC	49°16′54″N 123°05′53″W	Vancouver municipality (8507)		
Alexander Residence	58 Alexander Street; Vancouver BC	49°17′01″N 123°06′11″W	Vancouver municipality (2811)		
Arco Hotel	81 West Pender Street; Vancouver BC	49°16′52″N 123°06′25″W	Vancouver municipality (7743)		
Arlington Hotel	302 West Cordova Street; Vancouver BC	49°17′00″N 123°06′36″W	Vancouver municipality (8563)		
Armoury	620 Beatty Street; Vancouver BC	49°16′47″N 123°06′39″W	Federal (4344)		Upload Photo
Atlantic Furnished Rooms	81 West Cordova Street; Vancouver BC	49°16′59″N 123°06′25″W	Vancouver municipality (2540)		Upload Photo
B.C. & Yukon Chamber of Mines Building	840 West Hastings Street; Vancouver BC	49°17′10″N 123°06′58″W	Vancouver municipality (10826)		
B.C. Market Company Building	25 Alexander Street; Vancouver BC	49°17′01″N 123°06′14″W	Vancouver municipality (2507)		
B.C. Permanent Building	330 West Pender Street; Vancouver BC	49°16′56″N 123°06′43″W	Vancouver municipality (6842)		
B.C. Plate Glass and Importing Co. Building	157 Water Street; Vancouver BC	49°17′04″N 123°06′29″W	Vancouver municipality (2537)		
Balmoral Hotel (Demolished Summer 2024 )	159 East Hastings Street; Vancouver BC	49°16′54″N 123°06′04″W	Vancouver municipality (8285)		Upload Photo
Bank of British Columbia	422 Richards Street; Vancouver BC	49°17′02″N 123°06′44″W	Vancouver municipality (7943)		
Bank of Commerce	501 Main Street; Vancouver BC	49°16′49″N 123°05′59″W	Vancouver municipality (2752)		
Bank of Nova Scotia	426 West Hastings Street; Vancouver BC	49°17′02″N 123°06′41″W	Vancouver municipality (7932)		
Bayview Community School	2251 Collingwood Street; Vancouver BC	49°15′59″N 123°10′59″W	Vancouver municipality (11313)		Upload Photo
BC Collateral and Loan Buildings	77 East Hastings Street; Vancouver BC	49°16′54″N 123°06′11″W	Vancouver municipality (5260)		Upload Photo
BC Electric Railway Company Terminal	425 Carrall Street; Vancouver BC	49°16′52″N 123°06′18″W	Vancouver municipality (2609)		Upload Photo
Beach Town House Apartments	1949 Beach Avenue; Vancouver BC	49°17′21″N 123°08′35″W	Vancouver municipality (8775)		
Beckett House	125 Boundary Road; Vancouver BC	49°17′01″N 123°01′26″W	Vancouver municipality (11020)		
Belmont Building	241 East Hasting Street; Vancouver BC	49°16′53″N 123°05′55″W	Vancouver municipality (8502)		Upload Photo
Bessborough Armoury	2025 West 11th Street; Vancouver BC	49°15′44″N 123°09′04″W	Federal (9513)		
Blair House	1550 Harwood Street; Vancouver BC	49°17′01″N 123°08′25″W	Vancouver municipality (11016)		Upload Photo
Bloedel Conservatory	4600 Cambie Street; Vancouver BC	49°14′32″N 123°06′50″W	Vancouver municipality (8776)		
Bodega Hotel	225 Carrall Street; Vancouver BC	49°16′58″N 123°06′18″W	Vancouver municipality (2514)		
Boeur House and Cottage	3532 West 5th Avenue; Vancouver BC	49°16′03″N 123°10′59″W	Vancouver municipality (10923)		Upload Photo
Boulder Hotel	9 West Cordova Street; Vancouver BC	49°16′57″N 123°06′17″W	Vancouver municipality (2530)		
Bowman Block	522 Beatty Street; Vancouver BC	49°16′51″N 123°06′32″W	Vancouver municipality (2046)		Upload Photo
Boyd Building	88 East Cordova Street; Vancouver BC	49°16′56″N 123°06′11″W	Vancouver municipality (7911)		Upload Photo
British Columbia Securities Building	402 West Pender Street; Vancouver BC	49°16′58″N 123°06′43″W	Vancouver municipality (7938)		
Brown and Company Warehouse	171 Water Street; Vancouver BC	49°17′04″N 123°06′29″W	Vancouver municipality (2539)		
Brunswick Pool Room	26 East Hastings Street; Vancouver BC	49°16′52″N 123°06′14″W	Vancouver municipality (8280)		Upload Photo
Building 1, Administration Building	1200 Stanley Park Drive; Vancouver BC	49°17′46″N 123°07′23″W	Federal (10841)		
Burns Block	342 Water Street; Vancouver BC	49°17′04″N 123°06′35″W	Vancouver municipality (2554)		
Burns Block	18 West Hastings Street; Vancouver BC	49°17′03″N 123°06′36″W	Vancouver municipality (8618)		
Byrnes Block	2 Water Street; Vancouver BC	49°17′00″N 123°06′18″W	Vancouver municipality (2529)		
Callister Block	30 West Cordova Street; Vancouver BC	49°16′57″N 123°06′22″W	Vancouver municipality (8559)		Upload Photo
Cambie Heritage Boulevard	4100-8400 Cambie Street; Vancouver BC	49°13′48″N 123°07′01″W	Vancouver municipality (11506)		Upload Photo
Cambie Hotel	310 Cambie Street; Vancouver BC	49°16′59″N 123°06′32″W	Vancouver municipality (2802)		
Campbell House	2728 Pandora Street; Vancouver BC	49°16′58″N 123°02′55″W	Vancouver municipality (10968)		Upload Photo
Canada Permanent Building	432 Richards Street; Vancouver BC	49°17′01″N 123°06′45″W	Vancouver municipality (6841)		
Canadian National Railways / VIA Rail Station	1150 Station Street; Vancouver BC	49°16′26″N 123°05′53″W	Federal (4527)		
Canadian Pacific Telegraph Building	432 West Hastings Street; Vancouver BC	49°17′01″N 123°06′43″W	Vancouver municipality (7962)		
Canuck Place	1690 Matthews Avenue; Vancouver BC	49°15′06″N 123°08′35″W	Vancouver municipality (11157)		
Carnegie Centre	401 Main Street; Vancouver BC	49°16′52″N 123°06′00″W	Vancouver municipality (2749)		
Central City Mission	233 Abbott Street; Vancouver BC	49°17′00″N 123°06′25″W	Vancouver municipality (2503)		Upload Photo
Ceperley Rounsfell Building	848 West Hastings Street; Vancouver BC	49°17′10″N 123°06′58″W	Vancouver municipality (10825)		
Chan House	658 Keefer Street; Vancouver BC	49°16′44″N 123°05′24″W	Vancouver municipality (10866)		
Cheng Wing Yeong Tong Society Building	79 East Pender Street; Vancouver BC	49°16′51″N 123°06′11″W	Vancouver municipality (7836)		
Chin Wing Chun Society Building	158 East Pender Street; Vancouver BC	49°16′49″N 123°06′04″W	Vancouver municipality (7803)		
Chinese Benevolent Association Building	104 East Pender Street; Vancouver BC	49°16′49″N 123°06′07″W	Vancouver municipality (7800)		
Chinese Freemasons Building	5 West Pender Street; Vancouver BC	49°16′51″N 123°06′18″W	Vancouver municipality (1511)		
Chinese School	121 East Pender Street; Vancouver BC	49°16′51″N 123°06′04″W	Vancouver municipality (7794)		
Chinese Theatre	124 East Pender Street; Vancouver BC	49°16′49″N 123°06′07″W	Vancouver municipality (7771)		
Chinese Times Building	1 East Pender Street; Vancouver BC	49°16′51″N 123°06′14″W	Vancouver municipality (1187)		
Chrysler Building	26 SW Marine Drive; Vancouver BC	49°12′39″N 123°06′25″W	Vancouver municipality (11254)		
City Hotel	90 Alexander Street; Vancouver BC	49°17′01″N 123°06′07″W	Vancouver municipality (2812)		
Clark House	132 West 10th Avenue; Vancouver BC	49°15′44″N 123°06′29″W	Vancouver municipality (10961)		Upload Photo
Coastal Church	1160 West Georgia Street; Vancouver BC	49°17′12″N 123°07′28″W	Vancouver municipality (11022)		
Commercial Block	211 Columbia Street; Vancouver BC	49°16′59″N 123°06′08″W	Vancouver municipality (2808)		
Condie Residence	335 West 11th Avenue; Vancouver BC	49°15′41″N 123°06′43″W	Vancouver municipality (10671)		
Cook Block	105 West Cordova Street; Vancouver BC	49°17′00″N 123°06′25″W	Vancouver municipality (2505)		Upload Photo
CPR Roundhouse	181 Roundhouse Mews; Vancouver BC	49°16′24″N 123°07′19″W	British Columbia (20046)		
Crane Building	540 Beatty Street; Vancouver BC	49°16′50″N 123°06′32″W	Vancouver municipality (2047)		Upload Photo
Crosby House	1529 West 33rd Avenue; Vancouver BC	49°14′31″N 123°08′26″W	Vancouver municipality (10965)		Upload Photo
Curry Residence	3409 Arbutus Street; Vancouver BC	49°15′22″N 123°09′11″W	Vancouver municipality (10670)		Upload Photo
Customs Examining Warehouse	326 Howe Street; Vancouver BC	49°17′10″N 123°06′52″W	Federal (4153)		Upload Photo
Dal Grauer Substation	944 Burrard Street; Vancouver BC	49°16′53″N 123°07′30″W	Vancouver municipality (8777)		Upload Photo
Dawson Building	375 Main Street; Vancouver BC	49°16′54″N 123°06′00″W	Vancouver municipality (8556)		Upload Photo
Des Brisay Block	122 Water Street; Vancouver BC	49°17′01″N 123°06′25″W	Vancouver municipality (2786)		
Desrosiers Block	6 East Hastings Street; Vancouver BC	49°16′52″N 123°06′14″W	Vancouver municipality (8271)		Upload Photo
Dodek Residence	6821 Laurel Street; Vancouver BC	49°13′25″N 123°07′34″W	Vancouver municipality (8778)		Upload Photo
Dominion Building	207 West Hastings Street; Vancouver BC	49°16′59″N 123°06′36″W	Vancouver municipality (8684)		
Dominion Hotel	210 Abbott Street; Vancouver BC	49°17′01″N 123°06′22″W	Vancouver municipality (2502)		
Dougall House	306 Abbott Street; Vancouver BC	49°16′58″N 123°06′25″W	Vancouver municipality (2804)		Upload Photo
Downs Residence	6275 Dunbar Street; Vancouver BC	49°13′46″N 123°11′10″W	Vancouver municipality (8268)		Upload Photo
Dr. Sun Yat-Sen Classical Chinese Garden and Park	578 Carrall Street; Vancouver BC	49°16′47″N 123°06′13″W	Vancouver municipality (20664)		
Dumoine Lodge	1498 Laurier Avenue; Vancouver BC	49°15′02″N 123°08′17″W	Vancouver municipality (10964)		Upload Photo
Dunn Block	110 Carrall Street; Vancouver BC	49°17′01″N 123°06′14″W	Vancouver municipality (2506)		
Dunn-Miller Block	8 West Cordova Street; Vancouver BC	49°16′56″N 123°06′18″W	Vancouver municipality (8557)		Upload Photo
Edgett Building	440 Cambie Street; Vancouver BC	49°16′54″N 123°06′36″W	Vancouver municipality (6507)		
Edward Hotel	302 Water Street; Vancouver BC	49°17′03″N 123°06′32″W	Vancouver municipality (2547)		
Europe Hotel	43 Powell Street; Vancouver BC	49°17′00″N 123°06′11″W	Vancouver municipality (7960)		
Europe Hotel Annex	43 Powell Street; Vancouver BC	49°17′00″N 123°06′11″W	Vancouver municipality (7961)		
Evergreen Building	1285 West Pender Street; Vancouver BC	49°17′21″N 123°07′30″W	Vancouver municipality (10822)		
F. Morgan Building	242 East Hastings Street; Vancouver BC	49°16′52″N 123°05′56″W	Vancouver municipality (8508)		
F.R. Stewart and Company Building	131 Water Street; Vancouver BC	49°17′04″N 123°06′25″W	Vancouver municipality (2542)		
Fairmont Training Academy	4949 Heather Street; Vancouver BC	49°14′21″N 123°07′19″W	Federal (4766)		
Federal Motor Company Building	1295 Seymour Street; Vancouver BC	49°16′33″N 123°07′37″W	Vancouver municipality (10824)		
Ferguson Block	6 Powell Street; Vancouver BC	49°16′59″N 123°06′14″W	Vancouver municipality (2522)		
Ferrera Court	504 East Hastings Street; Vancouver BC	49°16′51″N 123°05′35″W	Vancouver municipality (8511)		
Filion Block	204 Carrall Street; Vancouver BC	49°16′59″N 123°06′14″W	Vancouver municipality (2511)		Upload Photo
First Baptist Church	969 Burrard Street; Vancouver BC	49°16′53″N 123°07′33″W	Vancouver municipality (10919)		
First Rogers Block	303 West Hastings Street; Vancouver BC	49°16′58″N 123°06′36″W	Vancouver municipality (7929)		Upload Photo
Flack Block	163 West Hastings Street; Vancouver BC	49°16′57″N 123°06′32″W	Vancouver municipality (5094)		
Fleck Brothers Building	103 Powell Street; Vancouver BC	49°17′01″N 123°06′07″W	Vancouver municipality (7893)		
Former B.C. Hydro Building	989 Nelson Street; Vancouver BC	49°16′52″N 123°07′30″W	Vancouver municipality (8779)		
Former Main Post Office	701 West Hastings Street; Vancouver BC	49°17′10″N 123°07′01″W	Federal (14821)		
Former Vancouver Law Courts (Vancouver Art Gallery)	750 Hornby Street, Vancouver, BC V6Z 2H7	49°16′58″N 123°07′12″W	Federal (7439)	Q371960	More images
Former Vancouver Public Library	750 Burrard Street; Vancouver BC	49°17′00″N 123°07′19″W	Vancouver municipality (8944)		
Fortin Building	57 West Cordova Street; Vancouver BC	49°16′59″N 123°06′22″W	Vancouver municipality (2517)		Upload Photo
Fountain Chapel	823 Jackson Avenue; Vancouver BC	49°16′37″N 123°05′38″W	Vancouver municipality (10695)		Upload Photo
Gardner Residence	3152 West 49th Avenue; Vancouver BC	49°13′36″N 123°10′30″W	Vancouver municipality (8784)		Upload Photo
Gastown Historic District		49°17′05″N 123°06′40″W	Federal (16124)	Q1495636	More images
General Gordon Elementary School	2896 West 6th Avenue; Vancouver BC	49°15′58″N 123°10′12″W	Vancouver municipality (11311)		Upload Photo
General Wolfe Elementary School	4251 Ontario Street; Vancouver BC	49°14′50″N 123°06′21″W	Vancouver municipality (11308)		
Glenesk Residence	2978 West 5th Avenue; Vancouver BC	49°16′02″N 123°10′19″W	Vancouver municipality (10693)		
Granville Hotel	24-26 Water Street; Vancouver BC	49°17′01″N 123°06′18″W	Vancouver municipality (1521)		Upload Photo
Great Western Hotel	110 Cambie Street; Vancouver BC	49°17′04″N 123°06′29″W	Vancouver municipality (2508)		
Greenshields Building	341 & 345 Water Street; Vancouver BC	49°17′05″N 123°06′36″W	Vancouver municipality (2555)		
Hampton Hotel	124 Powell Street; Vancouver BC	49°16′59″N 123°06′04″W	Vancouver municipality (7883)		
Hanning House	1826 Blanca Street; Vancouver BC	49°16′16″N 123°12′54″W	Vancouver municipality (10921)		Upload Photo
Harbour Block	73 Alexander Street; Vancouver BC	49°17′02″N 123°06′11″W	Vancouver municipality (7860)		
Harper Warehouse	151 Water Street; Vancouver BC	49°17′04″N 123°06′29″W	Vancouver municipality (2541)		
Hartney Chambers	347 West Pender Street; Vancouver BC	49°16′58″N 123°06′43″W	Vancouver municipality (7937)		
Henderson Block	122 West Hastings Street; Vancouver BC	49°16′55″N 123°06′29″W	Vancouver municipality (8623)		
Hendrix House	827 East Georgia Street; Vancouver BC	49°16′43″N 123°05′13″W	Vancouver municipality (10967)		
Hickey Block	228 Abbott Street; Vancouver BC	49°17′00″N 123°06′22″W	Vancouver municipality (2510)		Upload Photo
Holden Building	16 East Hastings Street; Vancouver BC	49°16′52″N 123°06′14″W	Vancouver municipality (7982)		Upload Photo
Holland Block	350 Water Street; Vancouver BC	49°17′04″N 123°06′36″W	Vancouver municipality (2559)		Upload Photo
Homer Street Arcade	332 Water Street; Vancouver BC	49°17′03″N 123°06′36″W	Vancouver municipality (2553)		
Horne Block	313 Cambie Street; Vancouver BC	49°17′00″N 123°06′32″W	Vancouver municipality (8273)		Upload Photo
Hotel Connaught	435 West Pender Street; Vancouver BC	49°17′00″N 123°06′43″W	Vancouver municipality (7942)		
Hotel Empress	235 East Hastings Street; Vancouver BC	49°16′54″N 123°05′56″W	Vancouver municipality (8465)		
Hotel Georgia	801 West Georgia Street; Vancouver BC	49°17′01″N 123°07′08″W	Vancouver municipality (11158)		
Hotel Metropole	320 Abbott Street; Vancouver BC	49°16′57″N 123°06′25″W	Vancouver municipality (2801)		Upload Photo
Hotel Stanley	36 Blood Alley Square; Vancouver BC	49°16′58″N 123°06′18″W	Vancouver municipality (2531)		
Hotel Winters	102 Water Street; Vancouver BC	49°17′01″N 123°06′25″W	Vancouver municipality (2528)		
Hudson's Bay Company Warehouse	321 Water Street; Vancouver BC	49°17′05″N 123°06′32″W	Vancouver municipality (2552)		
Hutchinson Block	429 West Pender Street; Vancouver BC	49°17′00″N 123°06′43″W	Vancouver municipality (7940)		
Hycroft	1489 McRae Avenue; Vancouver BC	49°15′25″N 123°08′14″W	Vancouver municipality (20663)		Upload Photo
International Order of Odd Fellows Hall	505 Hamilton Street; Vancouver BC	49°16′56″N 123°06′40″W	Vancouver municipality (6508)		
J.W. Horne Block	315 West Cordova Street; Vancouver BC	49°17′02″N 123°06′32″W	Vancouver municipality (2520)		
John Oliver Secondary School	530 East 41st Avenue; Vancouver BC	49°13′55″N 123°05′35″W	Vancouver municipality (10626)		
Jones Block	407 West Cordova Street; Vancouver BC	49°17′04″N 123°06′36″W	Vancouver municipality (2521)		Upload Photo
Kane Block	50 Water Street; Vancouver BC	49°17′01″N 123°06′22″W	Vancouver municipality (1173)		
Kelly, Douglas and Co. Warehouse	375 Water Street; Vancouver BC	49°17′06″N 123°06′36″W	Vancouver municipality (2558)		
Kendrick House	2543 Pandora Street; Vancouver BC	49°17′00″N 123°03′13″W	Vancouver municipality (10966)		
King Block	224 East Georgia Street; Vancouver BC	49°16′42″N 123°05′56″W	Vancouver municipality (7890)		
Kitsilano Secondary School	2550 West 10th Avenue; Vancouver BC	49°15′44″N 123°09′50″W	Vancouver municipality (10625)		Upload Photo
L'École Bilingue	1166 West 14th Avenue; Vancouver BC	49°15′30″N 123°07′48″W	Vancouver municipality (11310)		Upload Photo
Laura Secord Elementary School	2500 Lakewood Drive; Vancouver BC	49°15′42″N 123°03′43″W	Vancouver municipality (11307)		Upload Photo
Leckie Building	220 Cambie Street; Vancouver BC	49°17′02″N 123°06′29″W	Vancouver municipality (2509)		
Leeson, Dickie, Gross & Co. Warehouse	134 Abbott Street; Vancouver BC	49°17′03″N 123°06′22″W	Vancouver municipality (2501)		
Leslie House	1380 Hornby Street; Vancouver BC	49°16′35″N 123°07′52″W	Vancouver municipality (10697)		Upload Photo
Lim Sai Hor Association Building	525 Carrall Street; Vancouver BC	49°16′49″N 123°06′18″W	Vancouver municipality (2809)		
Lions Gate Bridge		49°18′55″N 123°08′18″W	Federal (11711)	Q124352	More images
Lipsett Building	66 Water Street; Vancouver BC	49°17′01″N 123°06′22″W	Vancouver municipality (2525)		
London Hotel	208 East Georgia Street; Vancouver BC	49°16′42″N 123°05′56″W	Vancouver municipality (7889)		
Lord Kitchener Elementary School	4055 Blenheim Street; Vancouver BC	49°15′02″N 123°10′48″W	Vancouver municipality (11312)		Upload Photo
Lord Strathcona Community School	592 East Pender Street; Vancouver BC	49°16′47″N 123°05′31″W	Vancouver municipality (11304)		
Lord Tennyson Elementary School	1936 West 10th Avenue; Vancouver BC	49°15′44″N 123°08′56″W	Vancouver municipality (11305)		Upload Photo
Lovell Block	117 Water Street; Vancouver BC	49°17′03″N 123°06′25″W	Vancouver municipality (2535)		
Lumbermen's Building	509 Richards Street; Vancouver BC	49°17′00″N 123°06′47″W	Vancouver municipality (2048)		
MacMillan Bloedel Building	1075 West Georgia Street; Vancouver BC	49°17′09″N 123°07′19″W	Vancouver municipality (8781)		
Magee House	6475 Balaclava Street; Vancouver BC	49°13′42″N 123°10′33″W	Vancouver municipality (10828)		Upload Photo
Mah Society Building	137 East Pender Street; Vancouver BC	49°16′51″N 123°06′04″W	Vancouver municipality (7802)		
Malkin Building	55 Water Street; Vancouver BC	49°17′02″N 123°06′18″W	Vancouver municipality (2604)		
Manitoba Hotel	50 West Cordova Street; Vancouver BC	49°16′57″N 123°06′22″W	Vancouver municipality (8561)		
Maple Grove Elementary School	6199 Cypress Street; Vancouver BC	49°13′48″N 123°09′00″W	Vancouver municipality (11306)		Upload Photo
Marpole Midden		49°12′14″N 123°08′20″W	Federal (15609)	Q5599542	More images
Martin and Robertson Warehouse	311 Water Street; Vancouver BC	49°17′05″N 123°06′32″W	Vancouver municipality (2550)		
May Wah Hotel	258 East Pender Street; Vancouver BC	49°16′48″N 123°05′53″W	Vancouver municipality (7861)		
McBeth and Campbell Building	326 West Pender Street; Vancouver BC	49°16′56″N 123°06′43″W	Vancouver municipality (6843)		
McClary Manufacturing Company Building	305 Water Street; Vancouver BC	49°17′05″N 123°06′32″W	Vancouver municipality (2548)		
McConnell Block	350 Water Street; Vancouver BC	49°17′04″N 123°06′36″W	Vancouver municipality (2556)		
McIntosh Block	36 West Cordova Street; Vancouver BC	49°16′57″N 123°06′22″W	Vancouver municipality (8560)		Upload Photo
McKinnon House	2628 West 5th Avenue; Vancouver BC	49°16′02″N 123°09′54″W	Vancouver municipality (11015)		Upload Photo
McLennan and McFeely Building	55 East Cordova Street; Vancouver BC	49°16′57″N 123°06′11″W	Vancouver municipality (1174)		
McLuckie Warehouse	353 Water Street; Vancouver BC	49°17′05″N 123°06′36″W	Vancouver municipality (2557)		Upload Photo
McPherson Building	322 Water Street; Vancouver BC	49°17′03″N 123°06′32″W	Vancouver municipality (2551)		
Merchants Bank	1 West Hastings Street; Vancouver BC	49°16′54″N 123°06′18″W	Vancouver municipality (1518)		Upload Photo
Ming Wo Building	23 East Pender Street; Vancouver BC	49°16′51″N 123°06′14″W	Vancouver municipality (7833)		
Mission House	150 Alexander Street; Vancouver BC	49°17′02″N 123°06′04″W	Vancouver municipality (7951)		Upload Photo
Mission to Seafarers	401 East Waterfront Road; Vancouver BC	49°17′09″N 123°05′42″W	Vancouver municipality (11155)		Upload Photo
Murrin Substation	721 Main Street; Vancouver BC	49°16′42″N 123°06′00″W	Vancouver municipality (2748)		Upload Photo
Nagle Brothers Garage	12 Water Street; Vancouver BC	49°17′00″N 123°06′18″W	Vancouver municipality (2524)		
Nationalist League Building	525 Gore Avenue; Vancouver BC	49°16′48″N 123°05′53″W	Vancouver municipality (2744)		
New Columbia Hotel	303 Columbia Street; Vancouver BC	49°16′56″N 123°06′07″W	Vancouver municipality (7900)		
New Fountain Hotel	36 Blood Alley Square; Vancouver BC	49°16′58″N 123°06′22″W	Vancouver municipality (2532)		
News-Advertiser Building	303 West Pender Street; Vancouver BC	49°16′57″N 123°06′40″W	Vancouver municipality (7934)		
Nichol House	1402 McRae Avenue; Vancouver BC	49°15′23″N 123°08′13″W	Vancouver municipality (11159)		
Oppenheimer Building	100 Powell Street; Vancouver BC	49°16′59″N 123°06′07″W	Vancouver municipality (7880)		Upload Photo
Opsal Steel Building	97 East 2nd Avenue; Vancouver BC	49°16′10″N 123°06′11″W	Vancouver municipality (11018)		Upload Photo
Orpheum Theatre	601 Smithe St, Vancouver, BC, V6B 3L4	49°16′48″N 123°07′14″W	Federal (7645)	Q7103961	More images
Pacific Transfer Company Building	120 East Cordova Street; Vancouver BC	49°16′56″N 123°06′07″W	Vancouver municipality (2741)		
Pantages Theatre	144 East Hastings Street; Vancouver BC	49°16′52″N 123°06′04″W	Vancouver municipality (8284)		
Park Grocery and Woodside Apartments	2598 Eton Street; Vancouver BC	49°17′16″N 123°03′08″W	Vancouver municipality (20665)		
Pender Hotel	31 West Pender Street; Vancouver BC	49°16′52″N 123°06′22″W	Vancouver municipality (7742)		Upload Photo
Pennsylvania Hotel	412 Carrall Street; Vancouver BC	49°16′52″N 123°06′14″W	Vancouver municipality (5095)		
Phoenix Hotel	237 East Hastings Street; Vancouver BC	49°16′53″N 123°05′55″W	Vancouver municipality (8501)		Upload Photo
Pither & Leiser Building	165 Water Street; Vancouver BC	49°17′04″N 123°06′29″W	Vancouver municipality (2538)		
Prince Rupert Meat Company Building	73 Water Street; Vancouver BC	49°17′03″N 123°06′22″W	Vancouver municipality (2526)		
Province Building	198 West Hastings Street; Vancouver BC	49°16′56″N 123°06′32″W	Vancouver municipality (8683)		Upload Photo
Queen Elizabeth Elementary School	4102 West 16th Avenue; Vancouver BC	49°15′26″N 123°12′00″W	Vancouver municipality (10628)		Upload Photo
Queen Elizabeth Theatre	688 Hamilton Street; Vancouver BC	49°16′49″N 123°06′47″W	Vancouver municipality (8921)		
R. V. Winch Building	739 West Hastings Street; Vancouver BC	49°15′00″N 123°07′01″W	Federal (4154)		
Rainier Hotel	309 Carrall Street; Vancouver BC	49°16′56″N 123°06′18″W	Vancouver municipality (2803)		Upload Photo
Rainsford and Co. Warehouse	115 Water Street; Vancouver BC	49°17′03″N 123°06′25″W	Vancouver municipality (2534)		
Ralph Block	126 West Hastings Street; Vancouver BC	49°16′55″N 123°06′29″W	Vancouver municipality (8624)		Upload Photo
Rand House	995 Bute Street; Vancouver BC	49°17′02″N 123°07′48″W	Vancouver municipality (10962)		
Rees & Higgins Block	238 Abbott Street; Vancouver BC	49°16′59″N 123°06′22″W	Vancouver municipality (6316)		Upload Photo
Regal Place	146 West Hastings Street; Vancouver BC	49°16′56″N 123°06′31″W	Vancouver municipality (8679)		Upload Photo
Regent Hotel	160 East Hastings Street; Vancouver BC	49°16′52″N 123°06′04″W	Vancouver municipality (8286)		Upload Photo
Riggs-Selman Building	319 West Pender Street; Vancouver BC	49°16′57″N 123°06′40″W	Vancouver municipality (6509)		
Roberts Block	311 West Pender Street; Vancouver BC	49°16′57″N 123°06′40″W	Vancouver municipality (7935)		
Roberts Building	18-20 Water Street; Vancouver BC	49°17′00″N 123°06′18″W	Vancouver municipality (2344)		
Robinson Block	Vancouver BC	49°17′00″N 123°06′18″W	Vancouver municipality (1172)		
Roosevelt Hotel	166 East Hastings Street; Vancouver BC	49°16′52″N 123°06′04″W	Vancouver municipality (8290)		
Royal Bank of Canada	400 Main Street; Vancouver BC	49°16′52″N 123°05′56″W	Vancouver municipality (2747)		
Royal Bank of Canada, West Hastings Branch	400 West Hastings Street; Vancouver BC	49°17′00″N 123°06′40″W	Vancouver municipality (7928)		
Runkle Block	247 Abbott Street; Vancouver BC	49°16′59″N 123°06′25″W	Vancouver municipality (2504)		Upload Photo
Saba Residence	2870 West 47th Avenue; Vancouver BC	49°13′45″N 123°10′12″W	Vancouver municipality (8783)		Upload Photo
Safeway Store	8555 Granville Street; Vancouver BC	49°12′34″N 123°08′28″W	Vancouver municipality (8922)		Upload Photo
Salvation Army Temple	301 East Hastings Street; Vancouver BC	49°16′54″N 123°05′49″W	Vancouver municipality (8509)		Upload Photo
Sam Kee Building	8 West Pender Street; Vancouver BC	49°16′49″N 123°06′18″W	Vancouver municipality (2814)		Upload Photo
Seaforth Armoury	1650 Burrard Street; Vancouver BC	49°16′17″N 123°08′38″W	Federal (9494)		
Second Rogers Block	412 West Hastings Street; Vancouver BC	49°17′01″N 123°06′41″W	Vancouver municipality (7931)		Upload Photo
Shamrock Hotel	635 East Hastings Street; Vancouver BC	49°16′53″N 123°05′28″W	Vancouver municipality (8513)		Upload Photo
Shannon	7101 Granville Street; Vancouver BC	49°13′13″N 123°08′31″W	Vancouver municipality (10922)		Upload Photo
Shelly Building	119 West Pender Street; Vancouver BC	49°16′53″N 123°06′29″W	Vancouver municipality (7748)		Upload Photo
Simpson House	5825 Carnarvon Street; Vancouver BC	49°14′01″N 123°10′23″W	Vancouver municipality (10920)		Upload Photo
Skinner Block	319 West Hastings Street; Vancouver BC	49°17′00″N 123°06′36″W	Vancouver municipality (7948)		Upload Photo
Springer and Van Bramer Block	301 West Cordova Street; Vancouver BC	49°17′02″N 123°06′32″W	Vancouver municipality (2519)		
St. Roch		49°16′39″N 123°08′50″W	Federal (9159)	Q3495303	More images
Stanley Park National Historic Site of Canada	Georgia Street; Vancouver BC	49°18′08″N 123°08′31″W	Federal (12546)		
Stanley Park Rock Garden	600 Pipeline Road; Vancouver BC	49°17′58″N 123°08′02″W	Vancouver municipality (21434)		Upload Photo
Storey and Campbell Warehouse	518 Beatty Street; Vancouver BC	49°16′51″N 123°06′32″W	Vancouver municipality (7721)		Upload Photo
Stratford Hotel	609 Gore Avenue; Vancouver BC	49°16′45″N 123°05′49″W	Vancouver municipality (2745)		Upload Photo
Sun Ah Hotel	100 East Pender Street; Vancouver BC	49°16′49″N 123°06′07″W	Vancouver municipality (7761)		
Sun Tower	100 West Pender Street; Vancouver BC	49°16′52″N 123°06′29″W	Vancouver municipality (5971)		
Swift Canadian Packing House and Office Building	21 Water Street; Vancouver BC	49°17′02″N 123°06′18″W	Vancouver municipality (2523)		
Taylor Building	310 Water Street; Vancouver BC	49°17′03″N 123°06′32″W	Vancouver municipality (2549)		
Taylor Manor	951 Boundary Road; Vancouver BC	49°16′36″N 123°01′30″W	Vancouver municipality (10959)		
Templeton Building	9 East Hastings Street; Vancouver BC	49°16′54″N 123°06′14″W	Vancouver municipality (8270)		Upload Photo
Templeton Secondary School	727 Templeton Drive; Vancouver BC	49°16′42″N 123°03′37″W	Vancouver municipality (11309)		
Terminus Hotel	28-38 Water Street; Vancouver BC	49°17′00″N 123°06′18″W	Vancouver municipality (1525)		
The Barn	2237 East Pender Street; Vancouver BC	49°16′50″N 123°03′32″W	Vancouver municipality (10960)		
The Homer	337 Smithe Street; Vancouver BC	49°16′43″N 123°07′05″W	Vancouver municipality (11021)		
The Shirley Houses	73-91 East 27th Avenue; Vancouver BC	49°14′51″N 123°06′14″W	Vancouver municipality (11256)		
Thompson Rooming House	110 Water Street; Vancouver BC	49°17′01″N 123°06′25″W	Vancouver municipality (2533)		
Tiedemann Block	440 West Pender Street; Vancouver BC	49°16′59″N 123°06′47″W	Vancouver municipality (7941)		
Town and Robinson Block	214 Carrall Street; Vancouver BC	49°16′58″N 123°06′14″W	Vancouver municipality (2513)		
Trafalgar Elementary School	4170 Trafalgar Street; Vancouver BC	49°15′01″N 123°09′50″W	Vancouver municipality (10627)		Upload Photo
Tweedale Block	341 East Hastings Street; Vancouver BC	49°16′54″N 123°05′49″W	Vancouver municipality (8510)		
Twigge Block	141 Water Street; Vancouver BC	49°17′04″N 123°06′29″W	Vancouver municipality (2536)		
Union Bank of Canada	93 West Cordova Street; Vancouver BC	49°16′59″N 123°06′25″W	Vancouver municipality (2518)		Upload Photo
Unitarian Church of Vancouver	949 West 49th Avenue; Vancouver BC	49°13′37″N 123°07′41″W	Vancouver municipality (8923)		Upload Photo
United Rooms	139 East Cordova Street; Vancouver BC	49°16′57″N 123°06′04″W	Vancouver municipality (7910)		
Vancouver Block	736 Granville Street; Vancouver BC	49°16′54″N 123°07′08″W	Vancouver municipality (10821)		
Vancouver Board of Parks and Recreation Offices	2099 Beach Avenue; Vancouver BC	49°17′27″N 123°08′46″W	Vancouver municipality (8824)		
Vancouver Club	915 West Hastings Street; Vancouver BC	49°17′13″N 123°06′58″W	Vancouver municipality (10864)		
Vancouver Gas Company Warehouse	135 Keefer Street; Vancouver BC	49°16′47″N 123°06′04″W	Vancouver municipality (2049)		
Vancouver Labour Temple	411 Dunsmuir Street; Vancouver BC	49°16′55″N 123°06′50″W	Vancouver municipality (10664)		
Vancouver Museum and H.R. MacMillan Space Centre	1100 Chestnut Street; Vancouver BC	49°16′33″N 123°08′35″W	Vancouver municipality (8920)		
Vancouver Public Safety Building	312 Main Street; Vancouver BC	49°16′55″N 123°05′56″W	Vancouver municipality (8782)		Upload Photo
Vancouver Vocational Institute	250 West Pender Street; Vancouver BC	49°16′53″N 123°06′40″W	Vancouver municipality (8924)		
Vancouver's Chinatown National Historic Site of Canada	Pender Street; Vancouver BC	49°17′09″N 123°07′01″W	Federal (18742)		
Victoria House	514 Homer Street; Vancouver BC	49°16′57″N 123°06′43″W	Vancouver municipality (7933)		
Victory Square Park	200 West Hastings Street; Vancouver BC	49°16′56″N 123°06′36″W	Vancouver municipality (11191)		
Villa del Lupo Restaurant	869 Hamilton Street; Vancouver BC	49°16′42″N 123°07′01″W	Vancouver municipality (11160)		
Vogue Theatre National Historic Site of Canada	918 Granville Street; Vancouver BC	49°16′48″N 123°07′23″W	Federal (5117)		
Washington Hotel	177 East Hastings Street; Vancouver BC	49°16′54″N 123°06′00″W	Vancouver municipality (8289)		Upload Photo
Westcoast Transmission Building	1333 West Georgia Street; Vancouver BC	49°17′20″N 123°07′37″W	Vancouver municipality (8780)		
Western Canada Building	416 West Pender Street; Vancouver BC	49°16′58″N 123°06′47″W	Vancouver municipality (7939)		
William Dick Building	379 West Hastings Street; Vancouver BC	49°17′01″N 123°06′36″W	Vancouver municipality (7930)		Upload Photo
Wing Sang Building	51 East Pender Street; Vancouver BC	49°16′51″N 123°06′11″W	Vancouver municipality (7835)		
Wright Building	52 East Hastings Street; Vancouver BC	49°16′52″N 123°06′11″W	Vancouver municipality (8282)		Upload Photo
Yale Hotel	1300 Granville Street; Vancouver BC	49°16′33″N 123°07′40″W	Vancouver municipality (10823)		
Yue Shan Society Buildings	33 East Pender Street; Vancouver BC	49°16′51″N 123°06′11″W	Vancouver municipality (11192)		
