= Parr and Fee =

Architectural firm in Vancouver, Canada

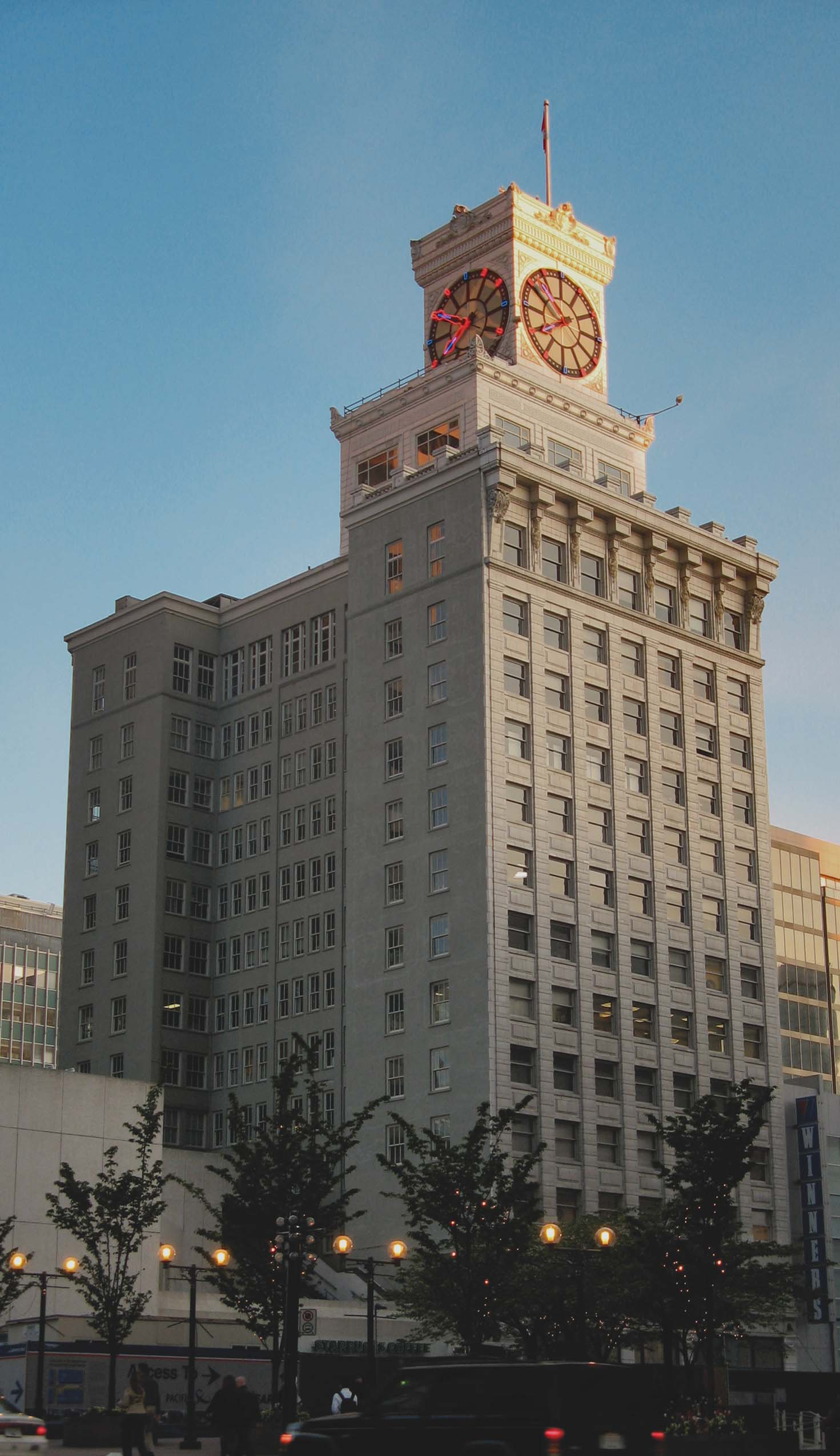
Vancouver Block (completed 1912)

Parr and Fee was an architectural partnership in Vancouver, Canada that functioned from 1899 to 1912.

== John Edmeston Parr ==
John Edmeston Parr (1856-1923) was born in London, England, the son of architect Samuel Parr. After attending preparatory school in Gravesend, England, he articled in his father's firm, Parr & Strong. He later become a partner and the firm's name was changed to Parr, Strong & Parr.

Parr left England in approximately 1888, living in Los Angeles, Seattle, Winnipeg, and Victoria, before settling in Vancouver in 1896. He opened a solo practice in Vancouver in 1896, and in 1897 formed a partnership with Samuel Maclure (1860-1929). Parr's short-lived partnership with Maclure lasted until Parr partnered with Thomas Fee in 1899.

In 1912, Parr left the partnership to form a new firm, Parr, Mackenzie, & Day (John Mackenzie and John Charles Day), which functioned until 1918.

== Thomas Arthur Fee ==
Thomas Arthur Fee (1860-1929) was born in Drummond County, Quebec. He contracted polio as a child, and needed to use leg braces his entire life. Fee learned the profession while working for Harry Wild Jones, an architect in Minneapolis.

Like many hotel architects of the era, Fee was both architect (with Parr) and owner of some of the hotels which he helped to design. When the firm of Parr and Fee was dissolved in 1912, Fee left the architectural profession to pursue other interests. He gained notoriety for opposing Canada's involvement in World War I and for promoting the idea that British Columbia should join the United States.

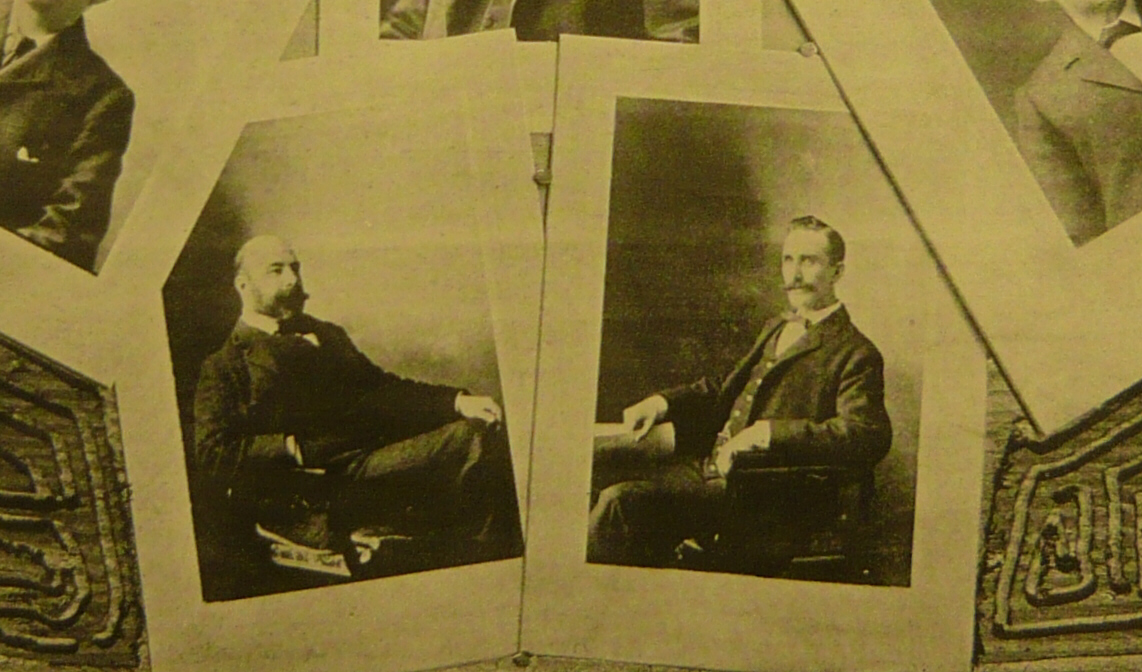
Parr and Fee

== Notable Commissions ==
All are in Vancouver unless otherwise specified; all are extant unless otherwise specified.

In chronological order:

- Thomson Block (1898), 339 West Hastings Street.
- McDowell, Atkins & Watson Company Building (1899), 300 Cambie Street. Now Cambie Hostel.
- Ralph Block (1899), 126 West Hastings Street.
- Fee House (1904), 1119 Broughton Street. Designated as a heritage building by the City of Vancouver; now integrated into a newer condo building.
- Hotel Martinique (1906), 1176 Granville Street. Later it was the Howard Johnson Hotel. It is currently Lugaat Supportive Housing.
- Third Malkin Warehouse (1907), 55-57 Water Street. The western section, designed by Parr and Fee, was built in 1907. J.M. McLuckie (1860-1927) designed the eastern section, built in 1912. This is now used for retail and condominiums, known as 55 Water.
- Manhattan Apartments (1908), 784 Thurlow Street at Robson Street, commissioned by lumber magnate William Lamont Tait.
- Dunsmuir Hotel (1908), 500 Dunsmuir Street at Richards Street. Later Dunsmuir International Village Student Housing. Demolished in 2025.
- Hotel Europe (1909), 43 Powell Street.
- Stadcona Apartments (1909), 601 Bute Street.
- 410 West 12th Avenue (1909). House with a domed tower, a feature frequently used by Parr and Fee.
- Mount Pleasant Presbyterian Church (1909), 2525 Carolina Street, now a condominium project. Designated as a heritage building by the City of Vancouver.
- Dufferin Hotel (1910), 900 Seymour Street at Smithe Street. Now Moda Hotel.
- Glen Brae House (1910), 1690 Matthews Street. Designated as a heritage building by the City of Vancouver. This mansion was commissioned by William Lamont Tait, a lumber magnate, and was noted for having a ballroom on its third floor, the floor underlaid with seaweed. The building is now Canuck Place, a hospice for children.
- Glenaird Hotel (1910), 1018 Granville Street, later Global Village Backpackers, now Samesun Backpackers Lodge.
- Clifton Hotel (1910), 1125 Granville Street.
- Granville Hotel (1911), 1261 Granville Street, also known as Newport Rooms, now The Granville Residence. Both interior and exterior have been renovated extensively.
- Hotel Barron (1911), 1002 Granville Street, now Hotel Belmont, also had been known as Comfort Inn.
- Royal Hotel (1911), 1025 Granville Street, later Hostelling International-Vancouver Central, now Granville Villa (supportive housing).
- St. Helen's Hotel (1911), 1161 Granville Street.
- Continental Hotel (1911-1912), 1390 Granville Street. Initially referred to as the Kilroy & Moran Block, then Bayview Hotel. Demolished in 2014.
- Vancouver Block (1911-1912), 736 Granville Street. Designated as a heritage building by the City of Vancouver (2006). The building was commissioned by Dominic Burns who had a two-story penthouse apartment at the top of the structure.
- Washington Hotel (1911-1912), 177-179 East Hastings Street. Also known as Hotel Maple and Hastings Hotel. Designated as a heritage building by the City of Vancouver (1994).

== Gallery ==
In chronological order:

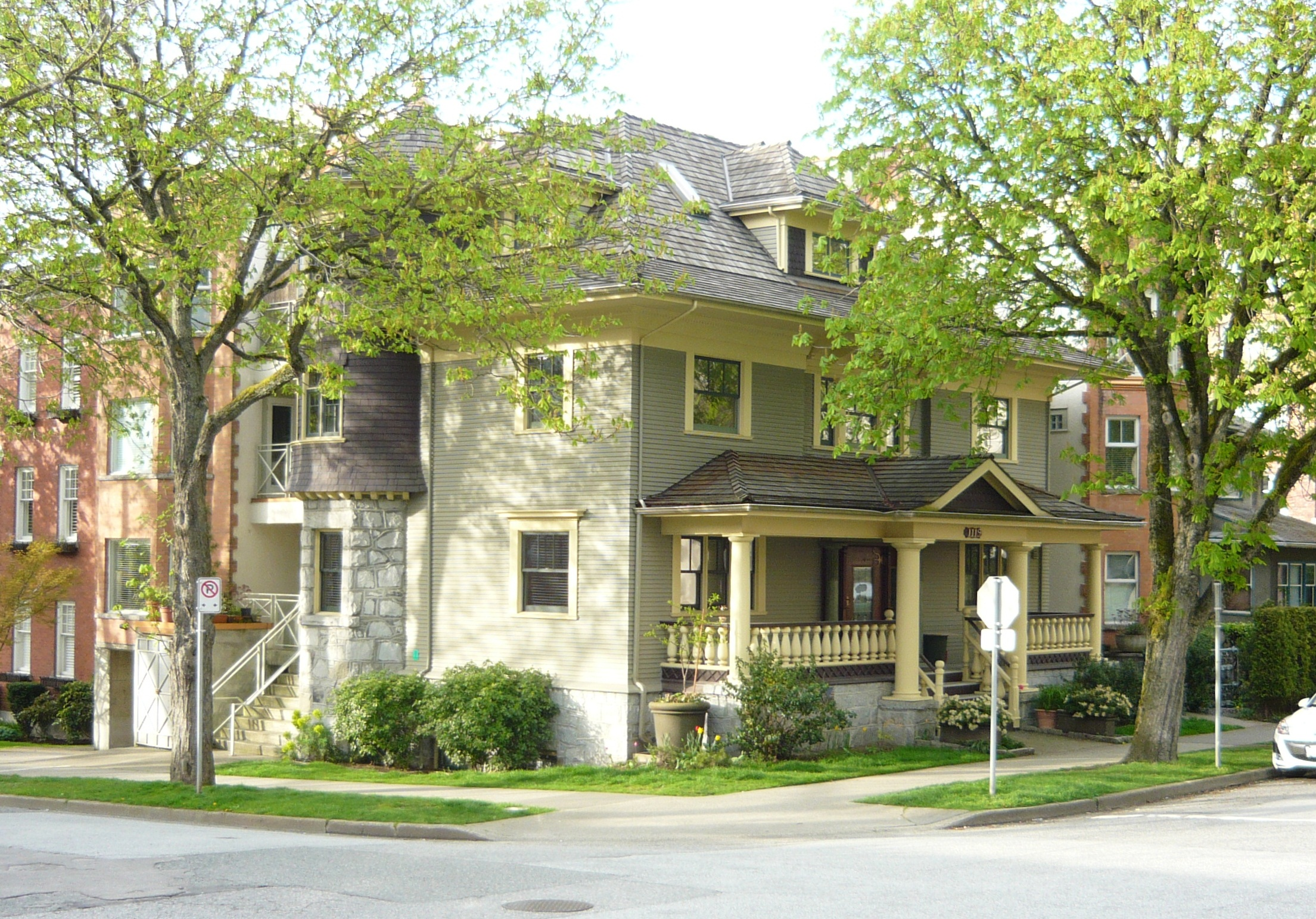
Fee House (1904)

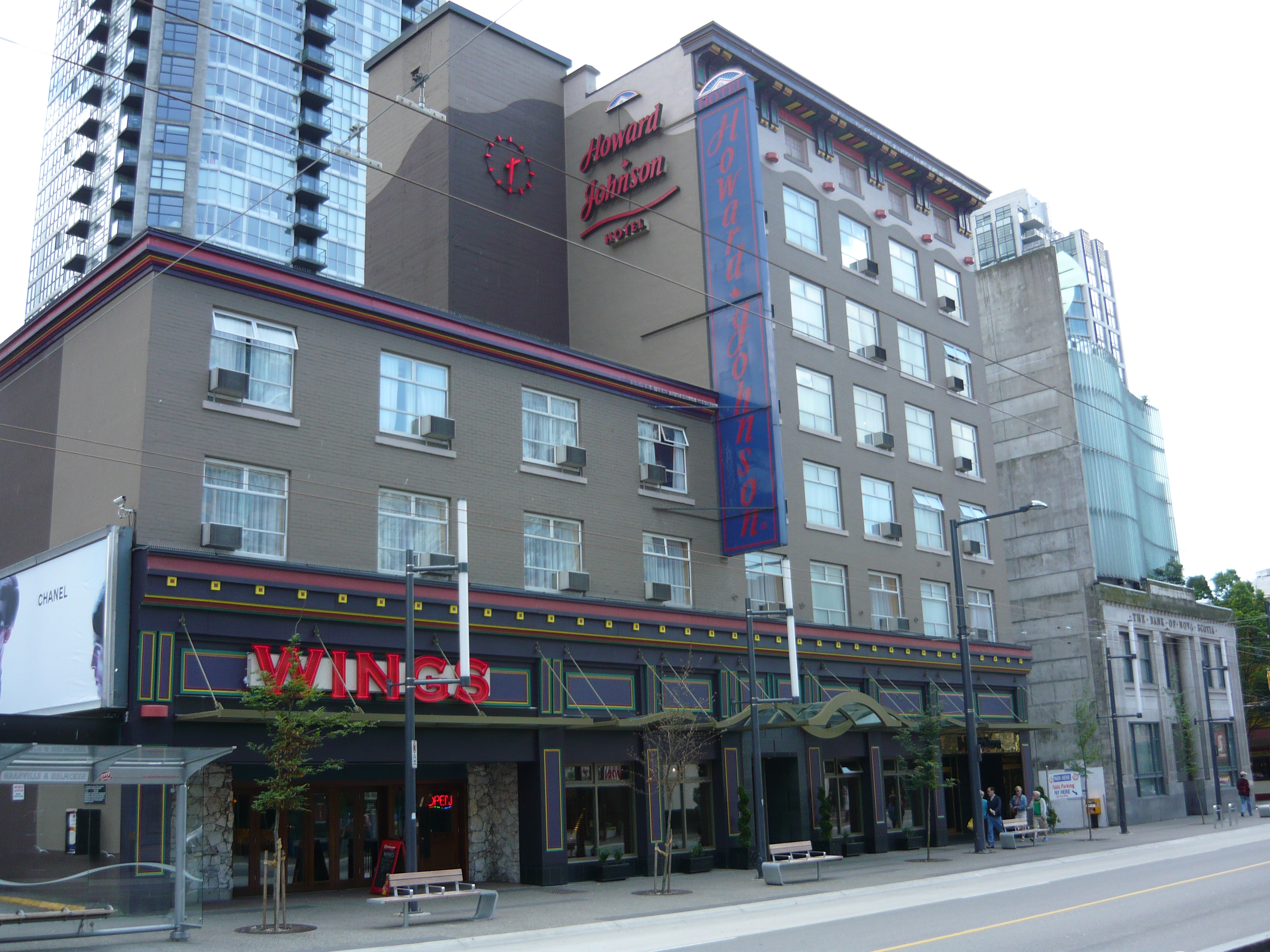
Hotel Martinique (1906)

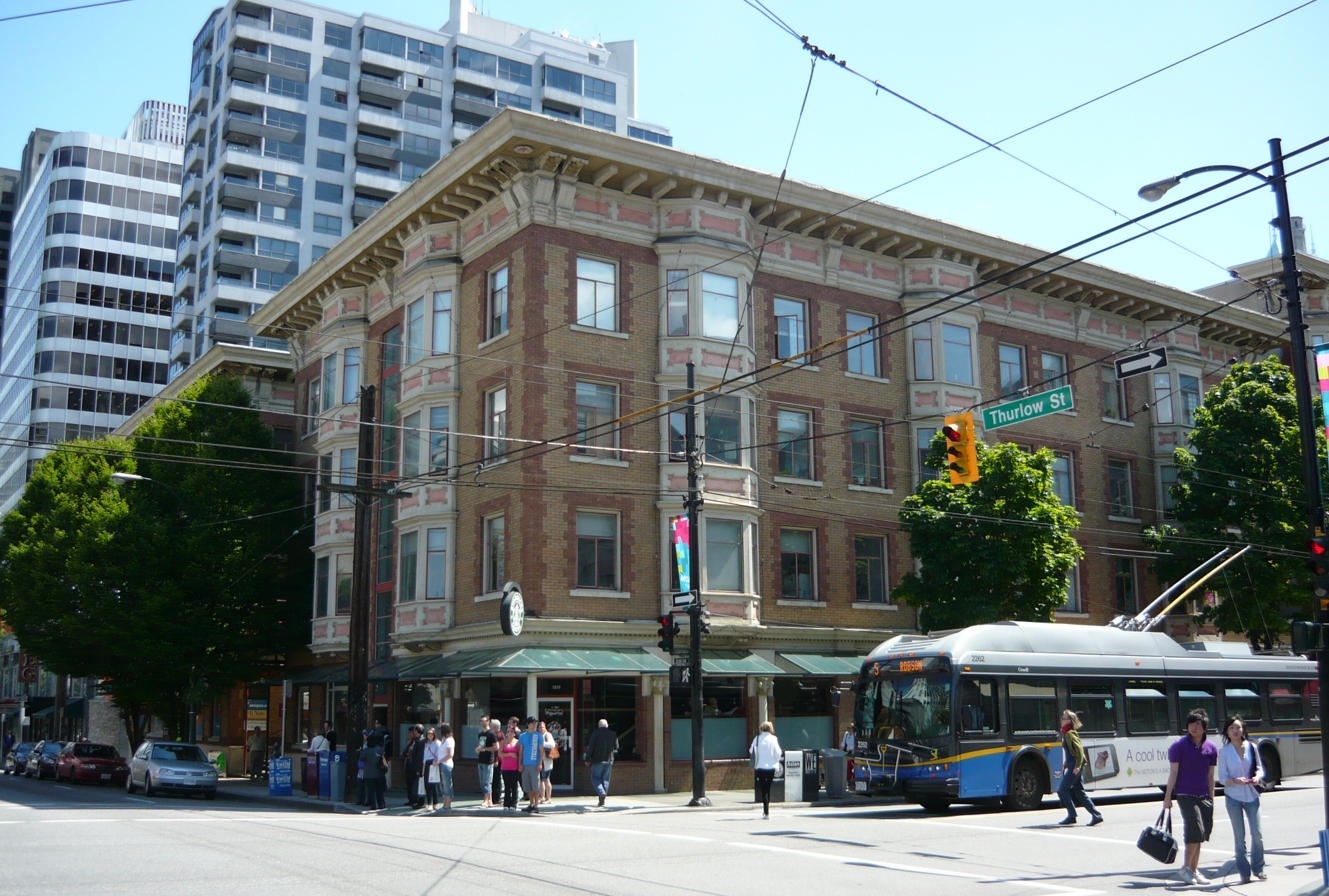
Manhattan Apartments (1908)

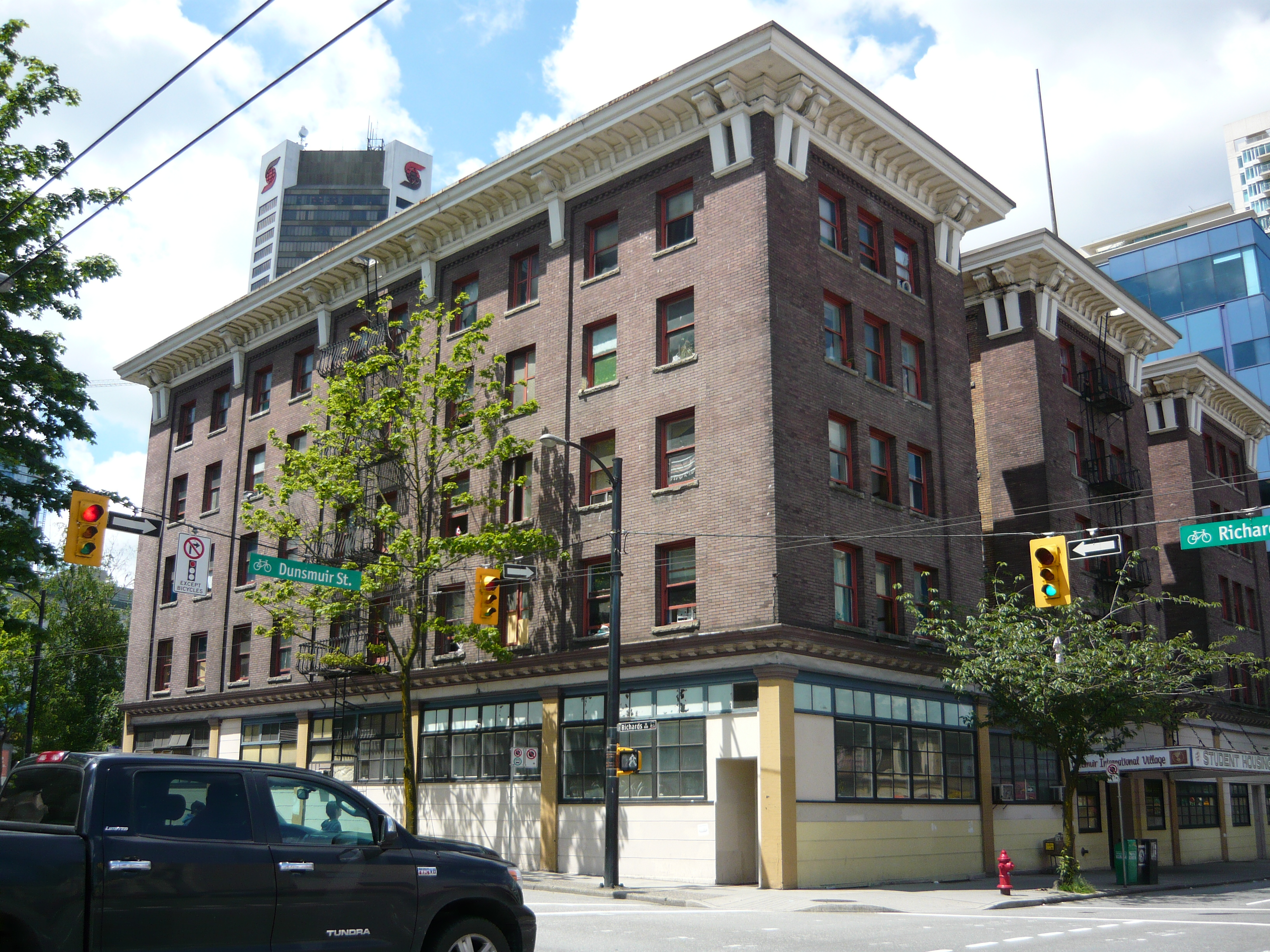
Dunsmuir Hotel (1908)

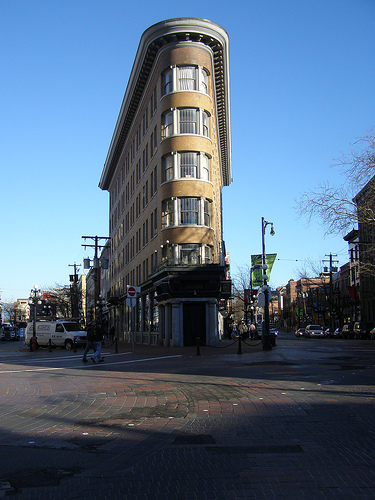
Hotel Europe (1909)

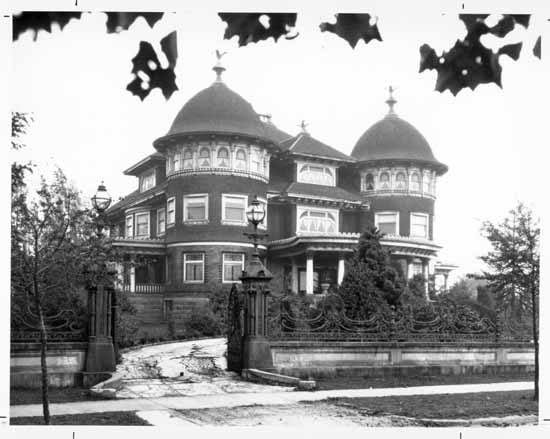
Glen Brae House (1910)
Now Canuck Place

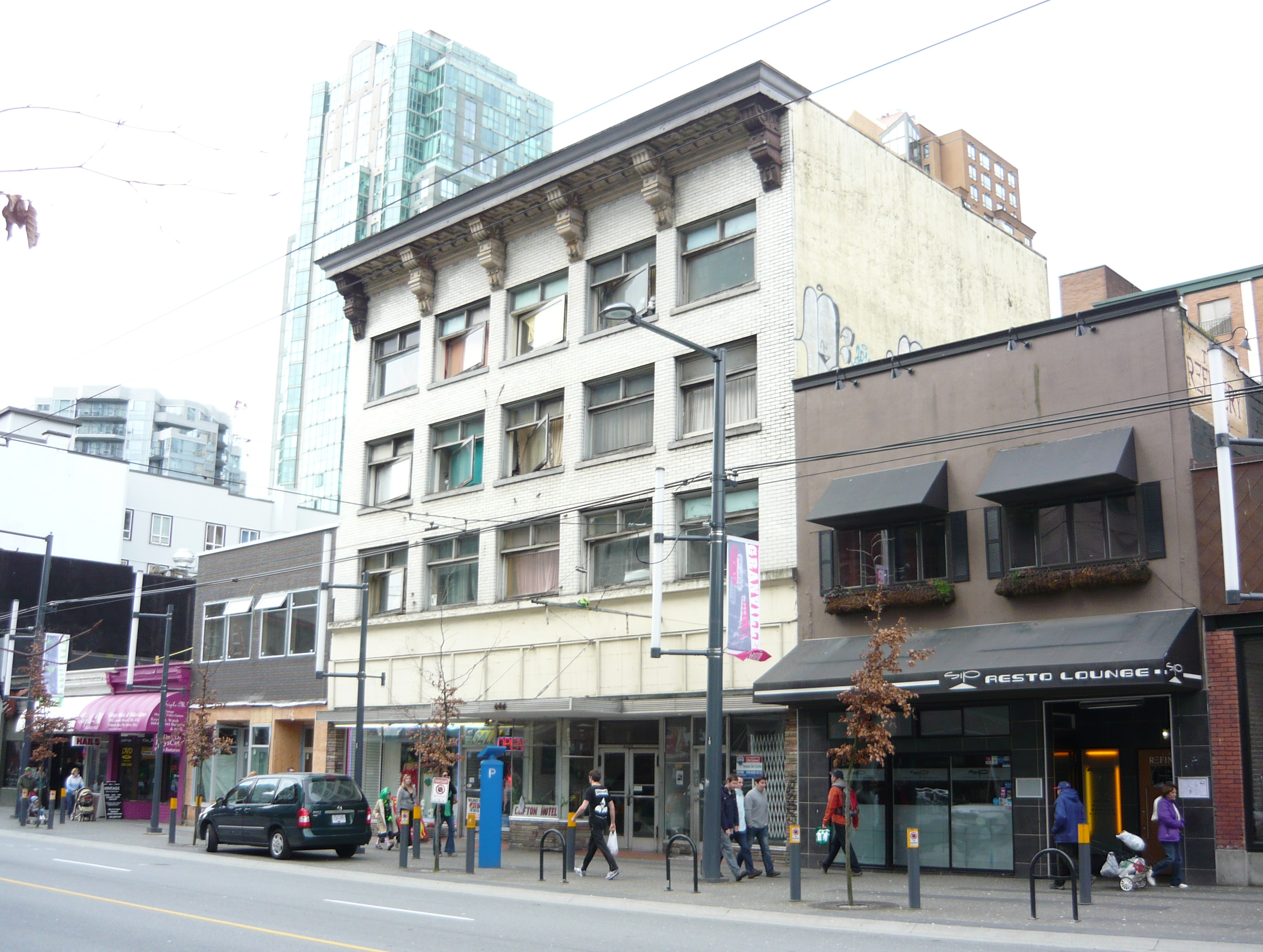
Clifton Hotel (1910)

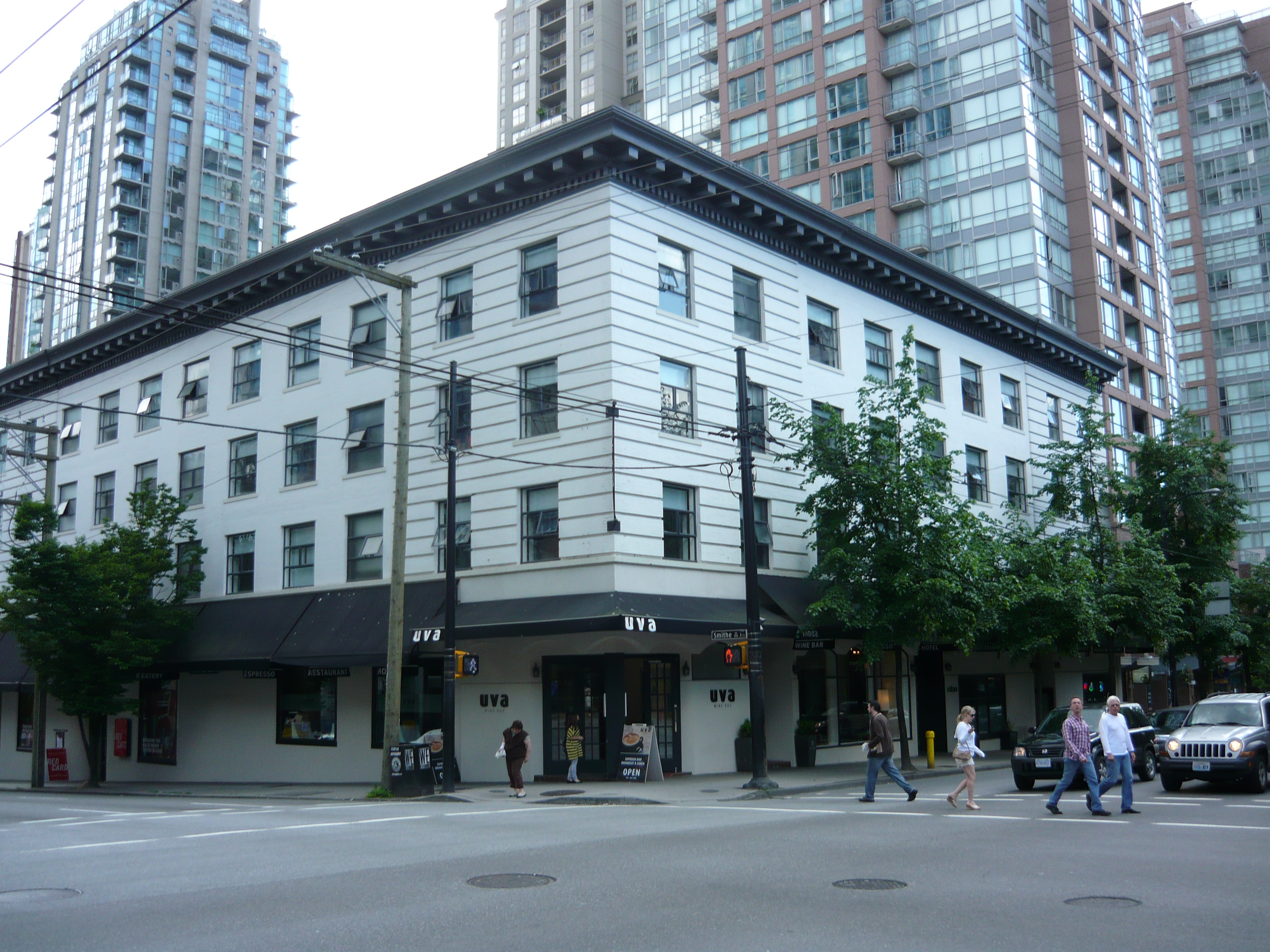
Dufferin Hotel (1910)
Now Moda Hotel

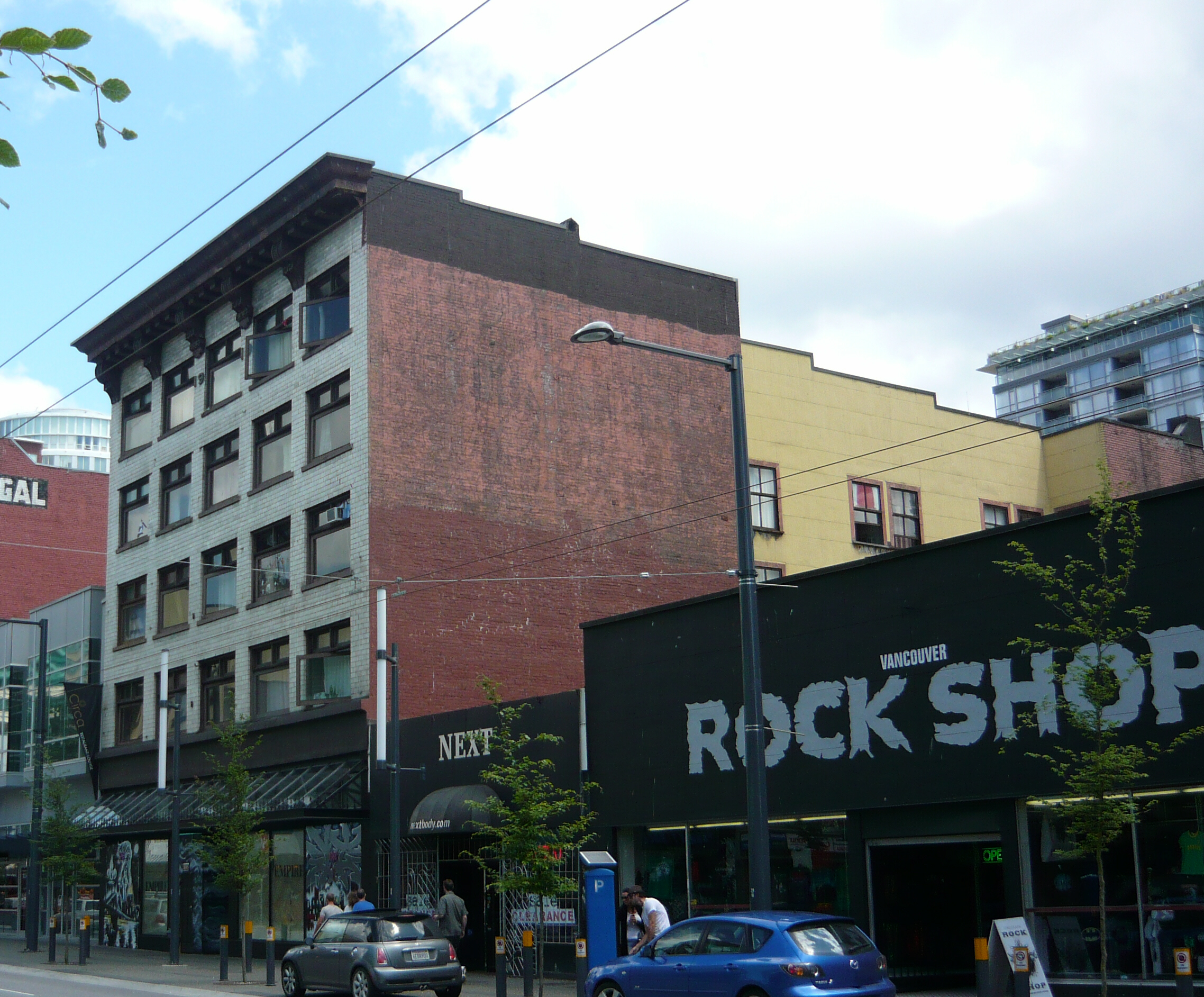
Hotel Vogue (1910)

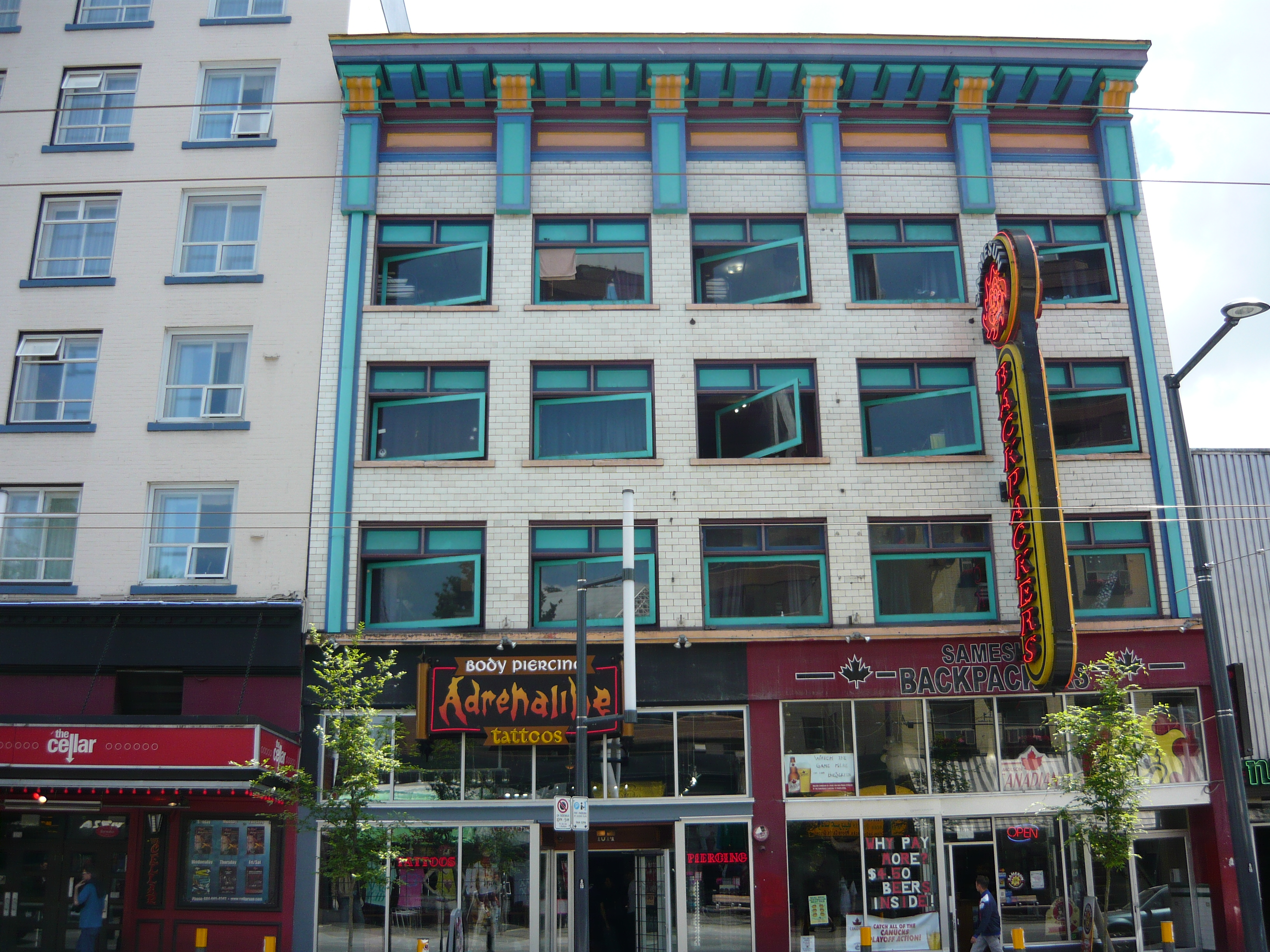
Glenaird Hotel (1910)

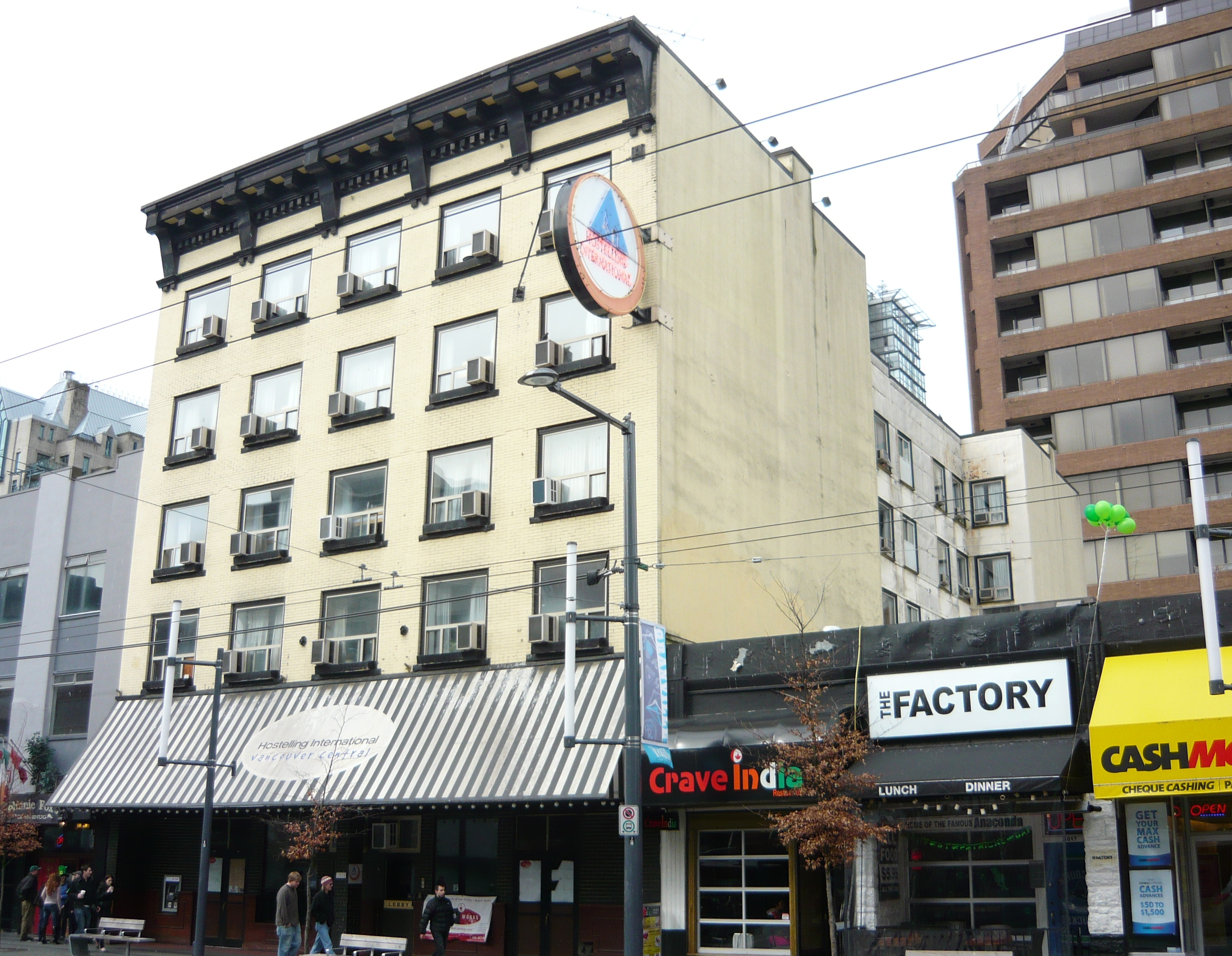
Royal Hotel (1911)
Now Granville Villa

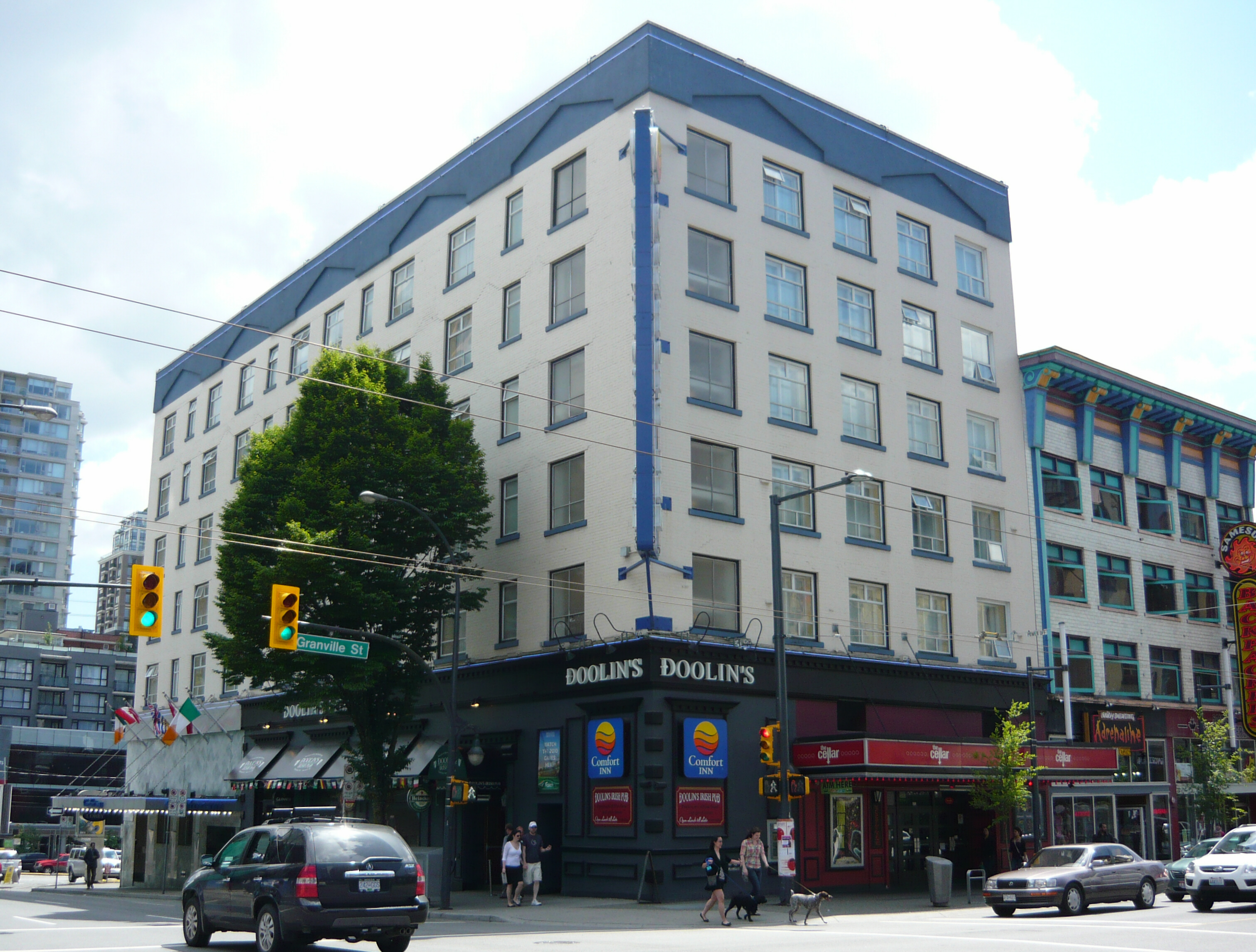
Hotel Barron (1911)
Now Hotel Belmont

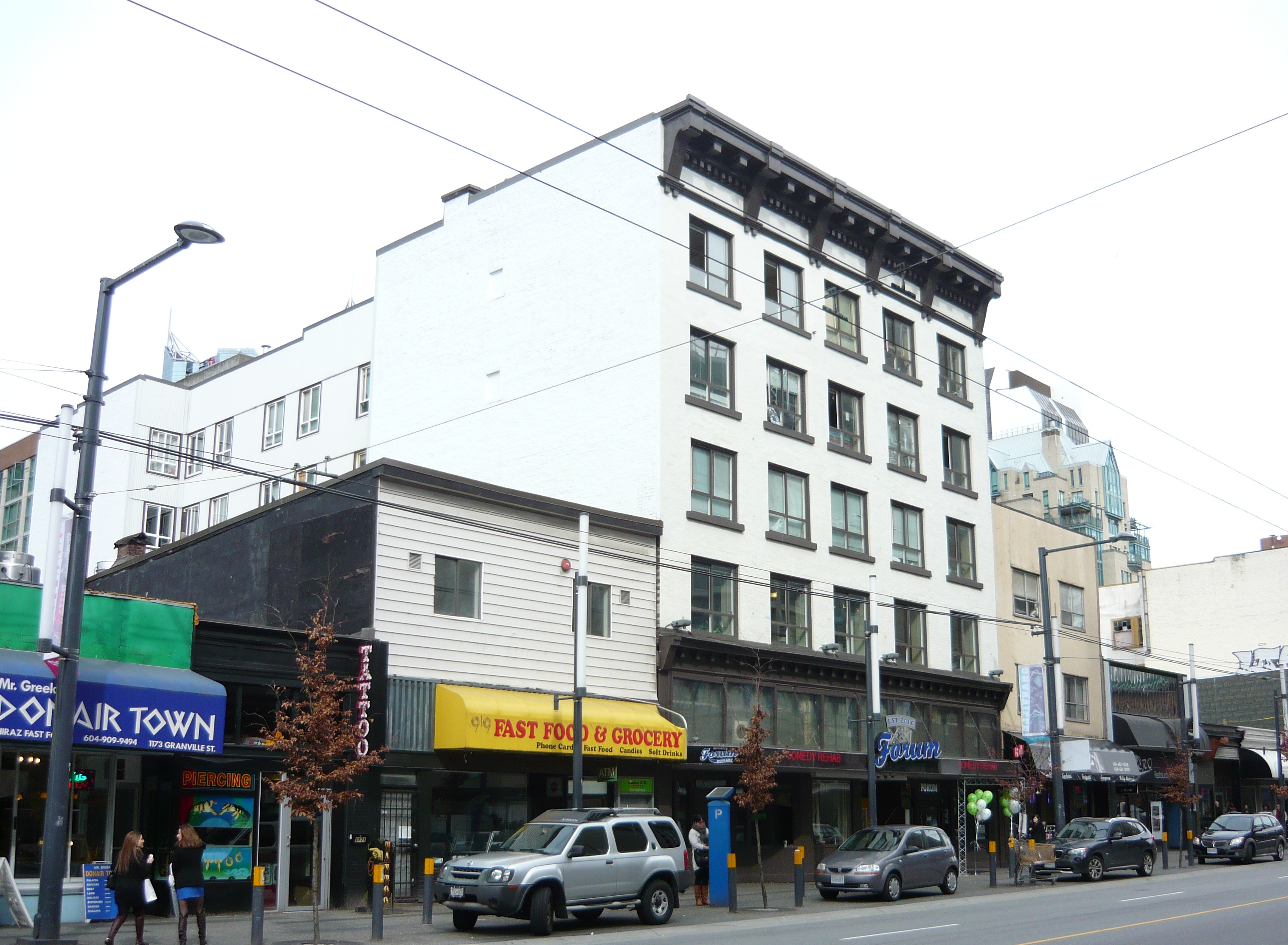
St. Helen's Hotel (1911)

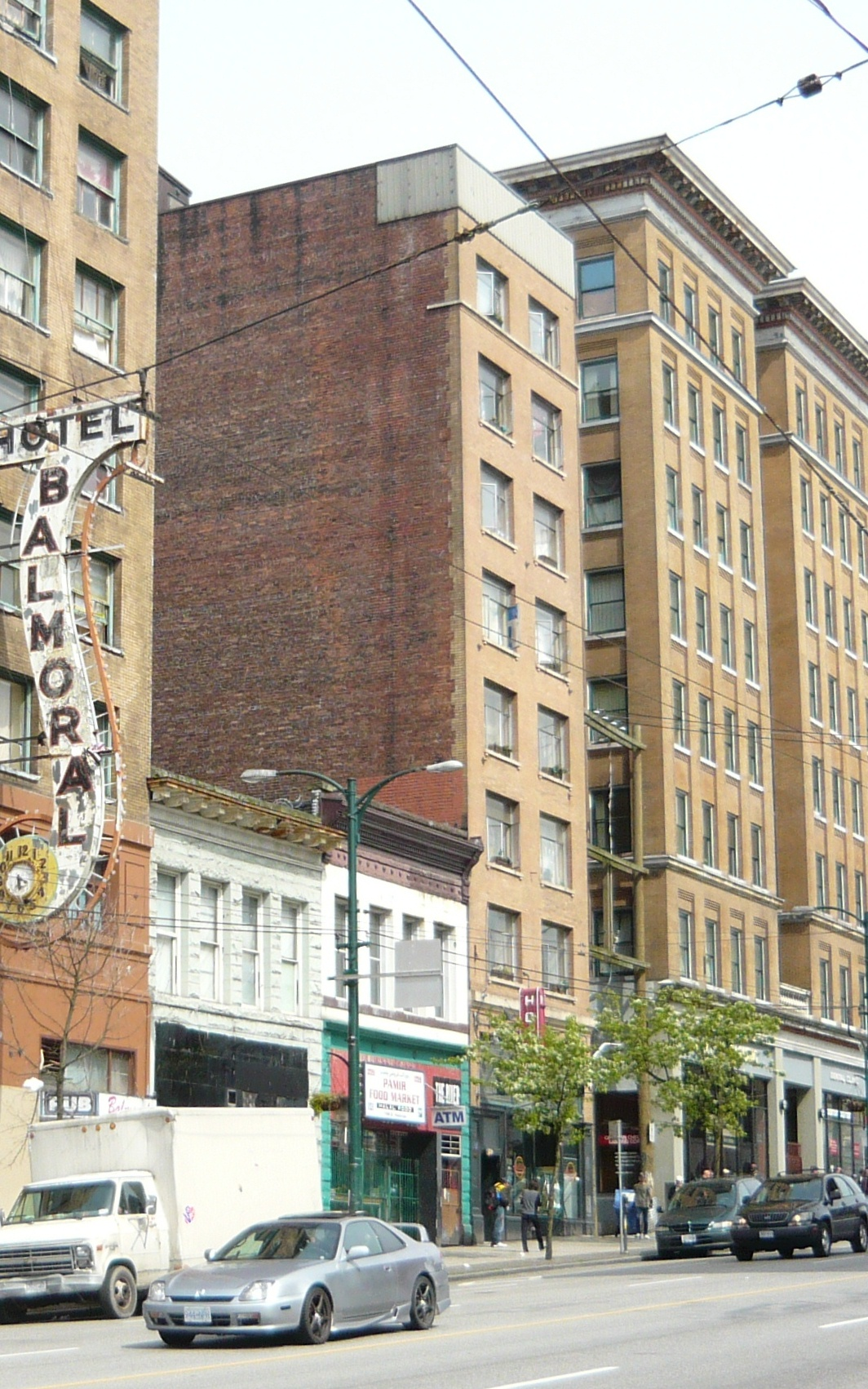
Washington Hotel (1912)
