= Vancouver Block =

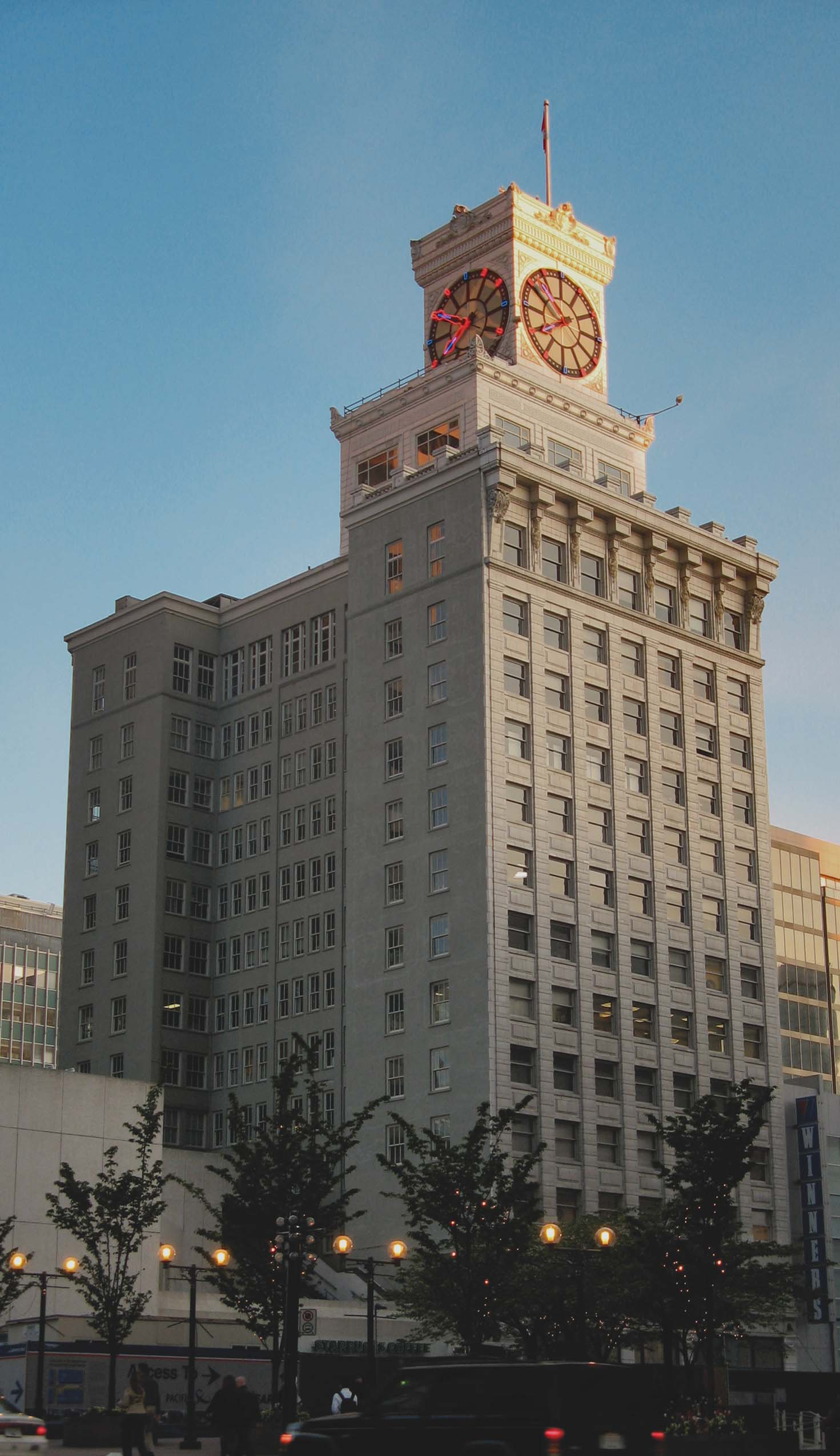
- Interactive map of the Vancouver Block area

General information
- Type: Commercial office building
- Architectural style: Edwardian Commercial
- Location: 736 Granville Street, Vancouver, British Columbia, Canada
- Coordinates: 49.2833°N 123.1161°W
- Opened: July 12, 1912
- Cost: $400,000
- Owner: Equitable Real Estate Investment Corp.

Height
- Height: 265 ft (81 m)

Technical details
- Structural system: Steel frame
- Floor count: 15

Design and construction
- Architect: Parr and Fee
- Developer: Dominic Burns

The Vancouver Block is a fifteen-storey heritage commercial building located at 736 Granville Street in downtown Vancouver, British Columbia, Canada. Completed in 1912, it was designed by the architectural firm of Parr and Fee in the Edwardian Commercial style for meatpacking magnate Dominic Burns. The building is distinguished by its landmark clock tower, which was the first large clock in Vancouver to be illuminated by neon lighting. Constructed on the highest point of land in downtown Vancouver, near the intersection of Georgia and Granville streets, the building helped establish this intersection as the city's commercial core in the early twentieth century.

The Vancouver Block was designated a historic structure under the Vancouver Charter in 1974, received Class A heritage status from the City of Vancouver in 2006, and was listed on the Canadian Register of Historic Places in 2009.

== History ==
=== Construction ===
In 1910, Dominic Burns commissioned the architectural firm of Parr and Fee to design an office building on Granville Street. Burns originally envisioned a seventeen-storey structure spanning three lots, but the final design was reduced to fifteen storeys on a single 75-by-120-foot (23 by 37 m) lot. A water permit was issued on 10 November 1910, followed by a building permit on 23 January 1911, with a listed construction value of $400,000. The steel framework was erected by the English contracting firm Norton Griffiths Ltd., which was concurrently involved in several other Vancouver construction projects.

In February 1912, Burns hosted a luncheon for twenty prominent businessmen and the architects to celebrate the completion of the steelwork. The building officially opened on 12 July 1912.

=== Ownership ===
Upon the building's completion, Dominic Burns moved into a specially commissioned two-storey penthouse situated beneath the clock tower, where he resided until his death on 19 December 1933. In 1934, Burns's estate sold the building to Toronto businessman Samuel Zacks for $1 million. Zacks sold it three years later to a local consortium for $1.4 million.

In 1959, Equitable Real Estate Investment Corp. purchased the Vancouver Block for $1.28 million and has owned and managed the building since.

=== Notable tenants and uses ===
The Commercial Club occupied the two uppermost floors when the building opened in 1912. After Dominic Burns's death, his penthouse was converted to office space and in the 1960s and 1970s served as offices for the National Film Board of Canada.

The building and its clock tower have served as a filming location for productions including Malone (1987) and Mission: Impossible – Ghost Protocol (2011).

== Architecture ==
=== Design and style ===
The Vancouver Block is described in the Canadian Register of Historic Places as an "over-the-top expression of the Edwardian Commercial style," featuring a classical tripartite composition with an ornamented ground floor, a simpler central section, and heavily decorated upper floors. The building stands approximately 265 feet (81 m) from sidewalk to flagpole.

The ground-floor façade features engaged columns with square capitals, marble panels, and an egg-and-dart string course. A suspended canopy over the entrance is supported by decorative brackets and metal cables tied to bronze lion-head anchor plates. The most prominent decorative element of the upper façade is a heavy cornice supported by two large corbels and six caryatids—sculpted female figures—whose arrangement incorporates a subtle asymmetry: three figures on one side cover a breast with their left hand, while the three on the opposite side use their right.

=== Materials and construction ===
The building employs a structural steel frame, using over 1,000 tons of steel, with foundations extending 80 feet (24 m) below sidewalk level to bedrock. The primary facades are clad in 13,000 cubic feet of matte-glazed ornamental terracotta supplied by the Gladding, McBean & Co. of Lincoln, California, which was shipped between June and August 1911.

Interior floors are finished in terrazzo with Belgian and Tennessee marble borders. Corridor walls are clad in Italian marble to a height of four feet, with quartered oak trim throughout the interior.

=== Mechanical systems ===
The building was equipped with four passenger elevators operating at 530 feet per minute and one five-ton-capacity freight elevator operating at 250 feet per minute. A complete vacuum cleaning system was installed, with six machines per floor. The building's plumbing, electrical, and heating systems were personally selected by Dominic Burns.

== Clock tower ==
The Vancouver Block's clock tower is its most recognizable feature and has been described as a civic landmark since the building's completion. The tower houses four clock faces, each 22 feet (6.7 m) in diameter, constructed from sandblasted plate glass weighing approximately four tons in total. The clock mechanism was installed by the Standard Electric Time Company and features eight-foot (2.4 m) aluminium hour hands and eleven-foot (3.4 m) minute hands. At the time of installation, it was reportedly the largest clock on the Pacific Coast.

=== Neon illumination ===
In 1927, red and blue neon tubing was added to illuminate the clock's hands and dial markings, making it reportedly the first neon-lit clock in Vancouver and one of the earliest introductions of neon lighting to the city. The illuminated clock inspired other businesses to adopt neon signage, contributing to Vancouver's emergence as a centre of neon sign culture by the 1950s.

=== Advertising ===
The clock tower became a sought-after advertising location. In the 1930s, Union Oil displayed its "76" logo in neon atop the tower. This was followed in the 1950s by signs for Shell, British American (BA), and Gulf oil companies. The last advertisement displayed was a painted Birks sign, after which a change in municipal bylaw prohibited further advertising on the structure.

In 1998, the neon was removed from the clock due to maintenance costs, but was restored two years later as part of efforts to revitalize Granville Street. In 2024, the neon lighting was replaced with energy-efficient LED lighting capable of changing colours.

=== Seismic events ===
The clock has stopped only twice in its operational history: during the magnitude 7.0 Vancouver Island earthquake of 6 December 1918, and during the magnitude 7.3 Vancouver Island earthquake of 23 June 1946.

== Dominic Burns ==
Dominic Burns was born in Ontario and moved west in 1878 with his brothers, including Patrick Burns, who founded P. Burns & Co., which grew into Western Canada's largest meatpacking enterprise, controlling approximately 700,000 acres (2,800 km²) of ranch land. Dominic managed the company's Yukon operations before relocating to Vancouver in 1903 to oversee the British Columbia division.

Burns commissioned the Vancouver Block in 1910 as both a commercial investment and personal residence, installing himself in the penthouse upon the building's completion. Contemporary accounts noted that he "weathered the financial depression" of the early 1930s better than many of his peers. He died on 19 December 1933.

== Architects ==
=== John Edmeston Parr ===
John Edmeston Parr (1856–1923) was born in Islington, London, the son of architect Samuel Parr. After attending preparatory school in Gravesend, he articled in his father's firm, Parr & Strong, later becoming a partner (Parr, Strong & Parr). He left England around 1888, living in Los Angeles, Seattle, Winnipeg, and Victoria before settling in Vancouver in 1896. After a brief partnership with Samuel Maclure (1897–1899), Parr formed his partnership with Thomas Fee in 1899. The firm was credited with over 200 projects in the Vancouver area. After the partnership dissolved in 1912, Parr formed a new firm, Parr, Mackenzie & Day, which operated until 1918.

=== Thomas Arthur Fee ===
Thomas Arthur Fee (1863–1929) was born in Durham County, Quebec. He contracted polio as a child and used leg braces throughout his life. Fee arrived in Vancouver on one of the first trains to reach Port Moody, then walked to the nascent city. He worked as a contractor before studying architecture in Minneapolis under Harry W. Jones in 1888–1889. Fee retired from practice in 1912 following the dissolution of the Parr and Fee partnership, and died in Vancouver on 21 December 1929.

=== Notable works by Parr and Fee ===
The firm's other significant buildings include the Hotel Europe (1908–1909) in Gastown—the first reinforced concrete structure in Canada—the Dunsmuir Hotel, the Dominion Theatre, and numerous commercial and residential structures throughout Vancouver.

== Heritage recognition ==
The Vancouver Block was first designated a historic structure under the Vancouver Charter in 1974, making it among the earliest heritage-designated properties in the city. In September 2006, the City of Vancouver formally awarded the building Class A heritage status and recognized its protected interior lobby following a multi-million dollar restoration by Orbis Architecture Inc., which returned the lobby to its original 20-foot ceiling height. Orbis received the City of Vancouver Heritage Awards Award of Merit for this work in 2011.

The building was listed on the Canadian Register of Historic Places on 13 January 2009. Its statement of significance recognizes the building's role in establishing the Georgia–Granville intersection as Vancouver's commercial core, its association with the architectural firm of Parr and Fee, its landmark status, and its representation of the Edwardian Commercial style.

A heritage plaque installed on the building reads: "This prominent office building was designed for Dominic Burns, a member of the pioneering meat packing family, in 1911-12 during the city's pre-World War I building boom."

== Current use ==
The Vancouver Block continues to operate as a commercial office building managed by Equitable Real Estate Investment Corp. The building's elevators, terrazzo floors, and marble finishes remain largely intact. A penthouse façade restoration was commenced in 2024, and the clock mechanism was repaired by horologist Ray Saunders in 2023. Equitable Real Estate has received two City of Vancouver Heritage Awards for its stewardship of the building: one for "pride and commitment to heritage buildings in downtown Vancouver" and another specifically for the retention and repair of the building exterior and the rehabilitation of original lobby finishes.

== See also ==
- List of heritage buildings in Vancouver
- Parr and Fee
- Patrick Burns (businessman)
- Gladding, McBean
- Sun Tower
- Granville Street
- Hotel Europe (Vancouver)
