= North Star Hotel =

Defunct hotel in Vancouver, Canada

Coordinates: 49.28177°N 123.10494°W

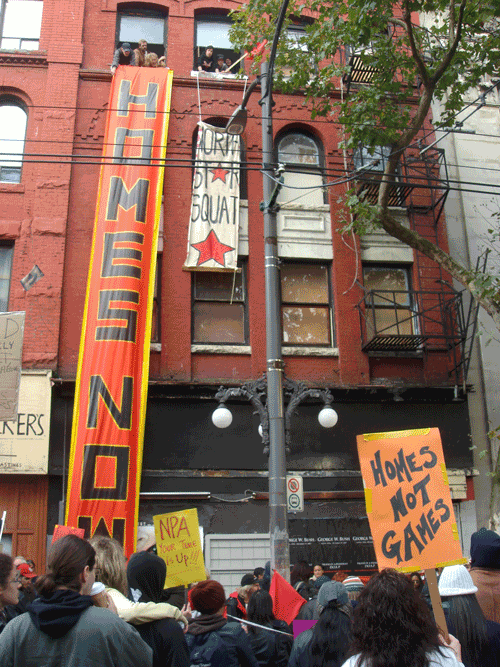
The North Star hotel, with banners hanging from the windows

The North Star hotel is a former hotel at the southern edge of Gastown in Vancouver, British Columbia, Canada. Located at 5 West Hastings Street, it is a four-story red brick Victorian Italianate construction completed at an unidentified date, between the 1890s and 1904.

== Architecture ==
The building was constructed as mixed use, with the main floor including storefront space. Details making it typical of late Victorian architecture include its four arched, vertically-coupled recessed double-hung windows; its rusticated stone stringcourse and sills; its front elevation with decorative brickwork, including stepped brick dentil below cornice level, semi-circular arches over fourth-storey double-hung sash windows, and moulded brickwork under rusticated stone string course. It may have been designed by George William Grant, whose nearby Ormidale Block bears some similar features. In 2003, the city of Vancouver recognized the building as one of historical significance.

== History ==
Like others built around the turn of the century, the lodging house originally hosted primarily single men working in seasonal resource industries. In 1913, it was called "Drexel Rooms", a name it kept until the 1980s, then later renamed the North Star Hotel or North Star Rooms, a single room occupancy hotel. It closed in 1999 after repeated code violations.

=== 2006 squat ===
At approximately 4 p.m. on October 22, 2006, organizers from the Anti-Poverty Committee launched a march from Vancouver's Pigeon Park to the North Star hotel which was entered and declared a squat. The top floor of the building was occupied by a handful of squatters while protestors remained outside.

Protestors claimed the action was taken because of the failure of Vancouver's Non-Partisan Association (including Mayor Sam Sullivan) to purchase unused hotels and convert them into affordable housing. Since Vancouver housing costs had increased dramatically in the past years (making it the most expensive housing market in Canada), protestors were concerned that buildings with single-room accommodation would be converted to other, more expensive, forms of housing. In 2006, hotel closures have led to a loss of as many as 200 housing units.

At first the police resisted any immediate action. "We're not going to move in until there's any sort of health and safety issue or until we've heard from the owners," said Vancouver Police Constable Tim Fanning. "It's been very peaceful." On October 24, however, 20 police officers announced a final warning and entered the North Star hotel to evict the six squatters inside. A group of protesters followed the police wagon on foot, protesting and blocking traffic. Vancouver APC organizers have declared their intention to occupy another building in the near future.

=== Renovation ===
In 2014, in what was described as a "highly unusual" application, the Solterra Group applied for permission to renovate the building with half the rooms reserved for low-income residents. In the proposal, five of the rooms were to be rented at the provincial shelter rate, and another 13 rooms at the provincial rent supplement rate, locked in for 30 years. In 2015, city hall voted to give the developer $50,000 to restore the building's facade, though as of 2016, the plans had not received all necessary permits.

== See also ==
- Anarchism in Canada
- Downtown Eastside
