= Glen Brae =

Historic house in Vancouver

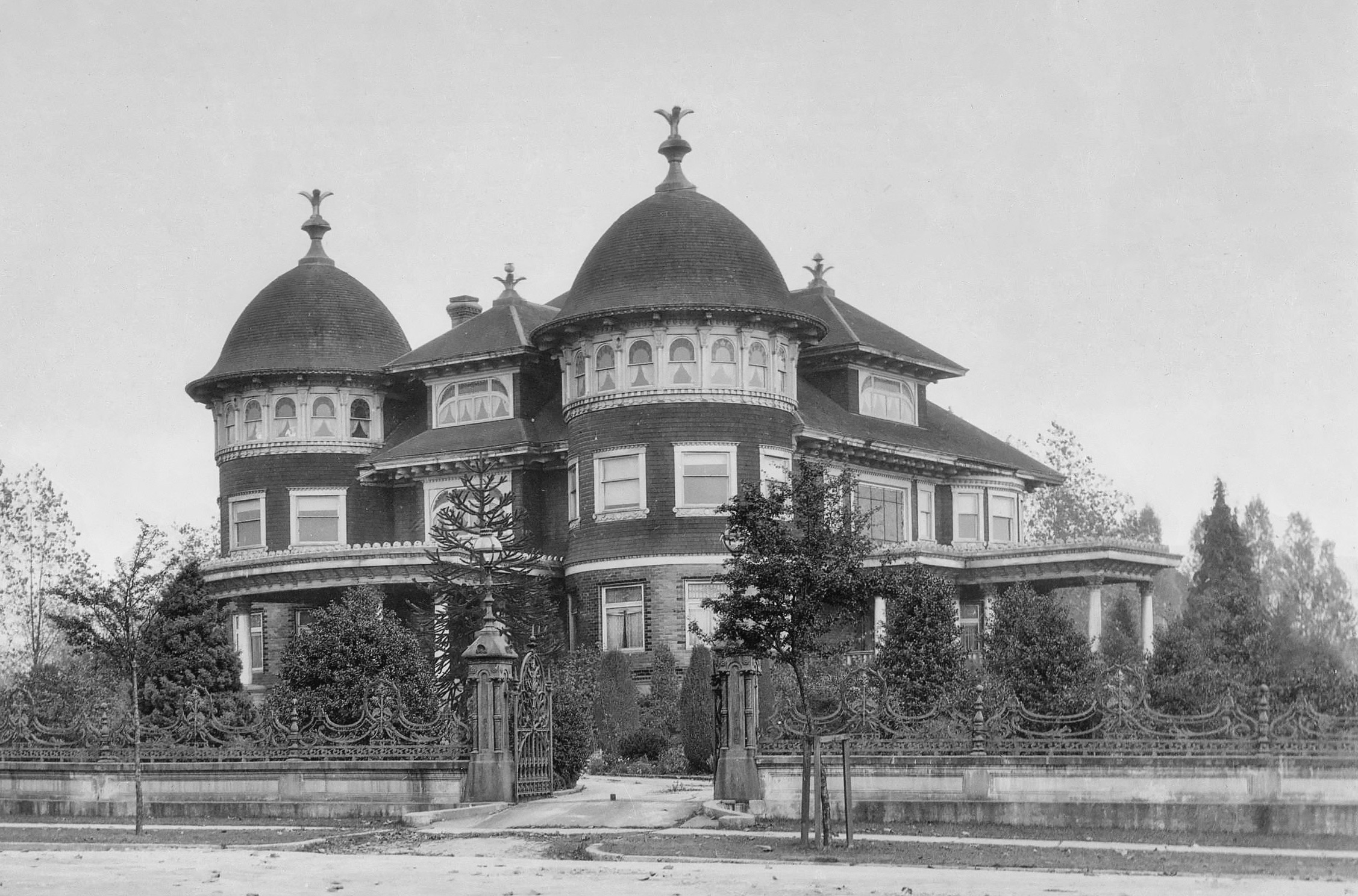
- Glen Brae in 1925
- Alternative names: Imperial Palace of the Kanadian Knights of the Ku Klux Klan; Canuck Place Children's Hospice

General information
- Status: Active
- Type: Residence; Hospice
- Architectural style: Scottish baronial
- Location: 1690 Matthews Avenue; Vancouver, Canada
- Coordinates: 49.2517°N 123.1429°W

Design and construction
- Architect: Parr and Fee

Glen Brae is a historic Scottish baronial mansion in Shaughnessy, Vancouver, British Columbia, Canada. In 1925, it became the Imperial Palace of the Kanadian Knights of the Ku Klux Klan. Since 1995, the building serves as Canuck Place Children's Hospice, the first free-standing children's hospice in North America. It is listed as Canuck Place on the Canadian Register of Historic Places.

== History ==
Glen Brae was built in 1911 for William Lamont Tait, a Scottish immigrant to the United States who later moved to Canada and established himself as a businessman. He hired the architects John Parr and Thomas Fee to design the house. The 16,000 square feet (1,500 m^{2}) mansion, featuring eighteen rooms and six bathrooms, was built on a high point at Matthews Avenue and Marguerite Streets on a 48,800 square feet (4,530 m^{2}) lot in the Shaughnessy neighborhood. The mansion features two domed turrets, ornate dentils on soffit, heads and sills, eave brackets, and Corinthian columns. Glen Brae also featured one of the first elevators in British Columbia, which was installed for Tait's wife who used a wheelchair. A wrought-iron fence and gate, made by Walter MacFarlane for $10,000, was built around the property.

Following Tait's death in 1919, Glen Brae was acquired in 1925 by the Vancouver chapter of the Ku Klux Klan to serve as their headquarters. They referred to the property as their "imperial palace". The Klan staged a public march from Downtown Vancouver to the residence. From this headquarters, they advocated for a ban on Asian immigration to Canada and paraded around the gardens carrying crosses made of red electric lights.

In 1929, the mansion was rented by a kindergarten.

In 1980, Glen Brae became a private hospital owned by Julian Wlosinksi and Elisabeth Wlosinksi. Elisabeth Wlosinski left the property to the City of Vancouver in her will. Following her death, the mansion has been home to the Canuck Place Children's Hospice, which opened on October 25, 1995 as the first free-standing children's hospice in North America.
