= Hotel Europe (Vancouver) =

Historic hotel in Vancouver, Canada

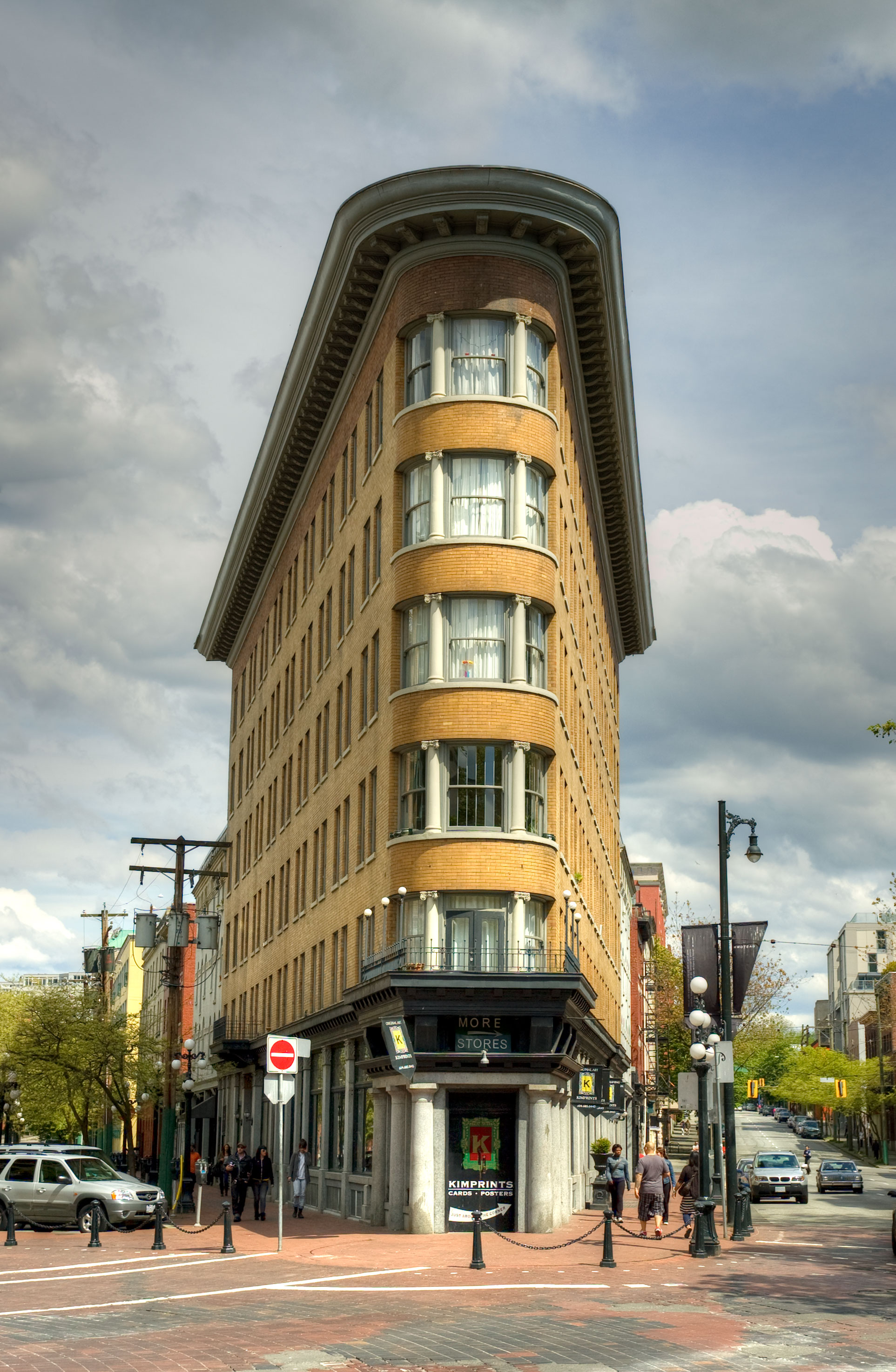
- Hotel Europe in 2012
- Interactive map of the Hotel Europe area

General information
- Type: Former: Hotel; Current: Low-income residential
- Location: Vancouver, British Columbia, 43 Powell Street
- Coordinates: 49°17′0.23″N 123°6′13.13″W
- Construction started: 1908
- Completed: 1909
- Renovated: 1983

Technical details
- Floor count: 6

Design and construction
- Architect: Parr and Fee

Hotel Europe is a six-storey heritage building located at 43 Powell Street (at Alexander) in the Gastown area of Vancouver, British Columbia. The building was commissioned by hotelier Angelo Calori and built in 1908-1909 by Parr and Fee Architects. Situated on a triangular lot, the building is designed in the flatiron style. It was the first reinforced concrete structure to be built in Canada and the earliest fireproof hotel in Western Canada. Contractors had to be brought in from Cincinnati, Ohio for the necessary expertise; the Ferro-Concrete Construction Company began this project six years after constructing the first tall concrete building in the world.

With funding from the Canada Mortgage and Housing Corporation, the building was renovated in 1983 as affordable housing with A. Ingre and Associates as the project designers. The residential units are now managed by the Affordable Housing Society. A beer parlour formerly existed below the ground floor, which included areaways extending underneath the above sidewalks. To prevent a cave-in from the weight of pedestrians and above ground traffic, the City of Vancouver filled the areaway in with pea gravel at a cost of $215,000, which presumably can be easily removed in the event of future restoration.

== In popular culture ==
The Hotel Europe was one of the filming locations for the suspense movie The Changeling. In it, the building houses the Seattle Historical Society, but the hotel sign can be seen on the right side facade of the building in some takes. Some scenes are set on its roof terrace. Hotel Europe was also a filming location in the 1994 epic drama film Legends of the Fall. It is also one of the locations for the music video Likey from the Korean female group Twice. It also appeared in the 1984 film The NeverEnding Story, as well as its 1990 sequel The NeverEnding Story II: The Next Chapter. The exterior is also briefly shown in the 2007 family comedy film Are We Done Yet?, as Ice Cube carries out a cardboard standee of Magic Johnson. It is also briefly seen in the 2019 made-for-tv thriller, The Past Never Dies.

== Gallery ==
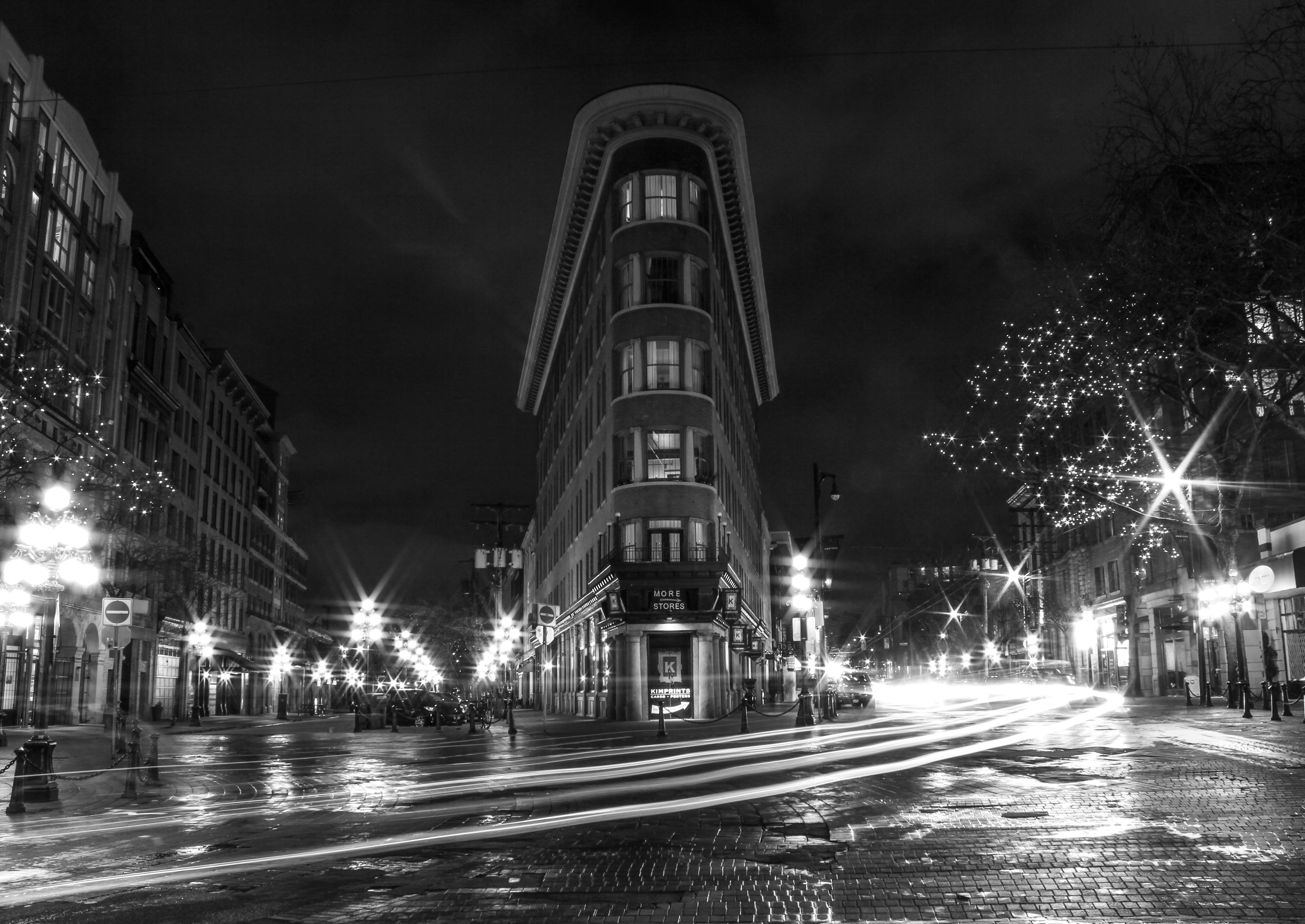
Europe Hotel by Night, 2013

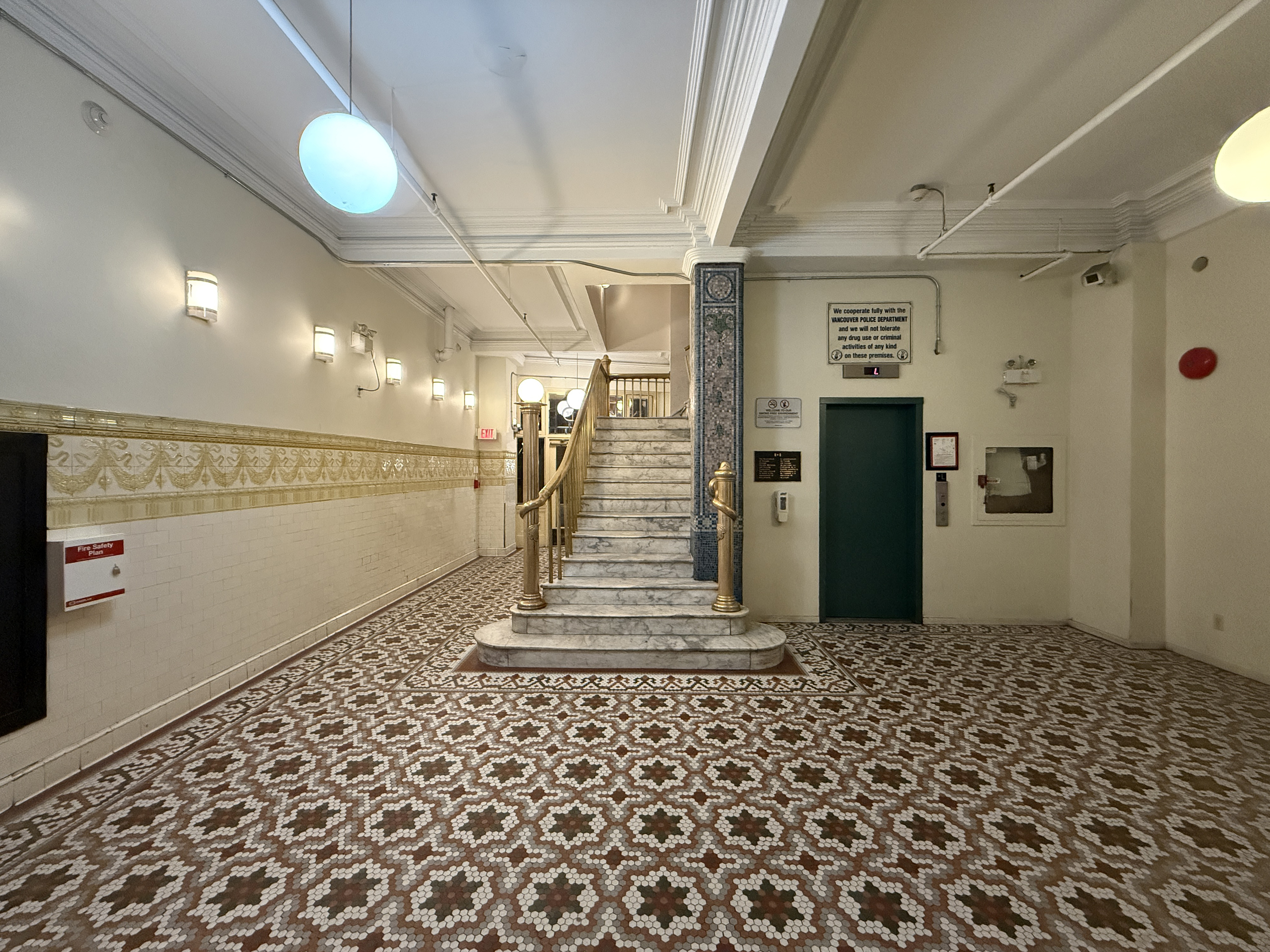
Hotel Europe Lobby
