= Olea Marion Davis =

Canadian artist

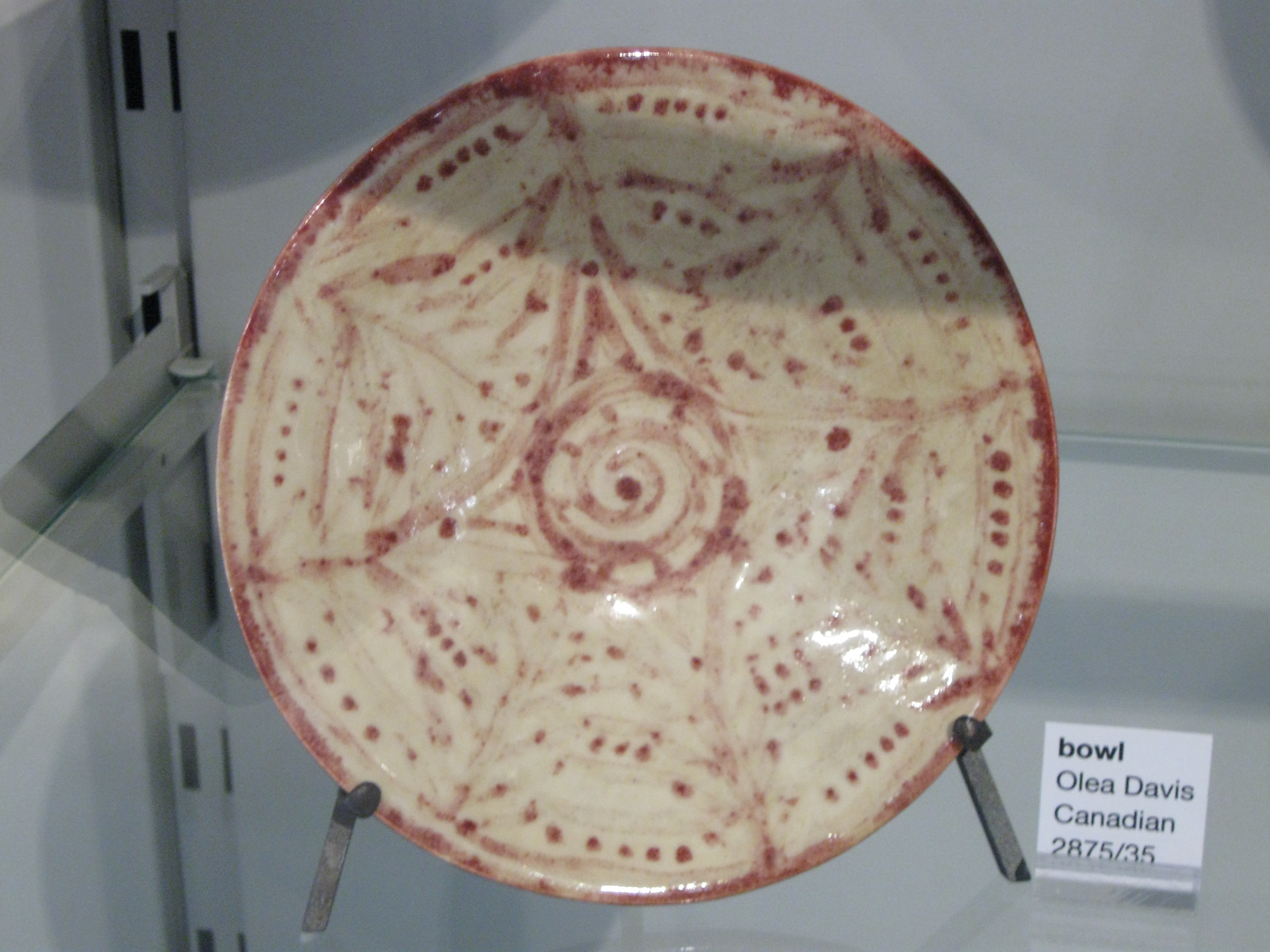
An Olea Davis Canadian bowl now located in the UBC Museum of Anthropology in Vancouver, Canada.

Olea Marion Davis (May 20, 1899 – 1977) (née Montgomery) was a Canadian artist and craftsperson who worked in architecture and decorative art as well as sculpture and pottery. Her sculptural and ceramic work was exhibited in Montreal, Toronto, Edmonton, as well as at the Brussels World Fair (Expo '58) in 1958 and the Ostende International Show in 1959. Her architectural commissions include friezes, ornamental grills and screens, and lighting fixtures for locations such as the Hotel Vancouver and Pier B.C. in Vancouver, British Columbia. Her work is included in the permanent collection of the Canadian Embassy in Washington, D.C.

== Early life and education ==
Davis was born in Buffalo, New York to Canadian parents. She graduated from McGill University with a diploma in Physical Education. From there, she studied at the École des beaux-arts in Montreal, the Ontario College of Art (now OCAD University) in Toronto, the Extension Department of the University of British Columbia, and the Vancouver School of Art (now Emily Carr University of Art and Design), where she learned from Canadian sculptor Charles Marega.

Davis married Henry Landerkin Roy Davis in 1926 and shortly after, the couple moved from Quebec to British Columbia.

== Professional projects ==
=== Hotel Vancouver ===
In the spring of 1939, Davis was one of several artists approached to execute decorative work for the Hotel Vancouver. Davis was recommended by the Vancouver Art Gallery to the Ornamental Bronze Co., which showed sample models of Davis' work to the hotel architect. Davis received a commission to create ornamental grills for the hotel. She produced clay and plaster models which were then sent to a foundry so that the metalwork could be cast in large quantities. The ornamental grills and light fixtures were installed around the tops of the walls in several large public rooms and halls in the building.

The decoration of the Hotel Vancouver was rushed to ensure that all work was completed by May 1939, in time for the Royal Visit, when King George VI and Queen Elizabeth stopped in Vancouver on the westbound portion of the 1939 Royal Tour.

Other artists commissioned for this project include:

- Charles Marega, Sculptor, Instructor in Sculpture at the Vancouver School of Art (now Emily Carr University of Art and Design).
- Beatrice Lennie, Painter and sculptor, Graduate of the Vancouver School of Art. Lennie produced a bas-relief sculpture titled Ascension.
- Valentine Shabief, Russian sculptor.
- Lilias Farley, painter and sculptor. Farley painted two murals with accompanying bronze details.

The decoration of the Hotel Vancouver was overseen by Chief Architect John Schofield, of Archibald and Schofield.

=== Pier B.C. ===
In her work for Pier B.C., Davis created rosettes which were added to the building as decorative detail for supporting chains to the marquee.

=== Potter's Guild of B.C. ===
An educator and strong advocate for the standardization and development of ceramic arts in British Columbia, Davis was the founder and first president of the BC Potter's Guild in 1955. Through her work with the Guild, she started summer schools, brought notable potters from around North America to teach workshops, and encouraged fellow artists to submit their work to juried international shows. She continued to work with the Guild until her death in 1977. Davis' efforts and contributions were subsequently recognized with the Olea Davis Memorial Award, which were launched in 1978.

=== Teaching ===
For many years, Davis taught at the University of British Columbia, Department of Extension, Fine Arts Division. From the early 1950s until 1969, Davis was responsible for running the UBC Pottery Hut and taught pottery courses, which included classes taught by renowned international ceramicists.

=== Other ===
Davis founded the Allied Officers Guild in B.C. during WWII.

The First World Congress of Craftsmen was held 8–19 June 1964 at Columbia University, where 942 conferees attended from 47 countries. One of the thirty delegates from Canada, Davis attended as a representative of both the Canadian Handicrafts Guild and the Canadian Guild of Potters.

== Exhibitions ==
- Canadian Ceramics '67, Montreal.
- Vancouver Art Gallery.
- UBC Fine Arts Gallery.

== Awards ==
In 1937, Davis won the medal for sculpture in the B.C. Artists' Exhibition at the Vancouver Art Gallery.
