= Hotel Vancouver =

Hotel in Vancouver

Fairmont Hotel Vancouver
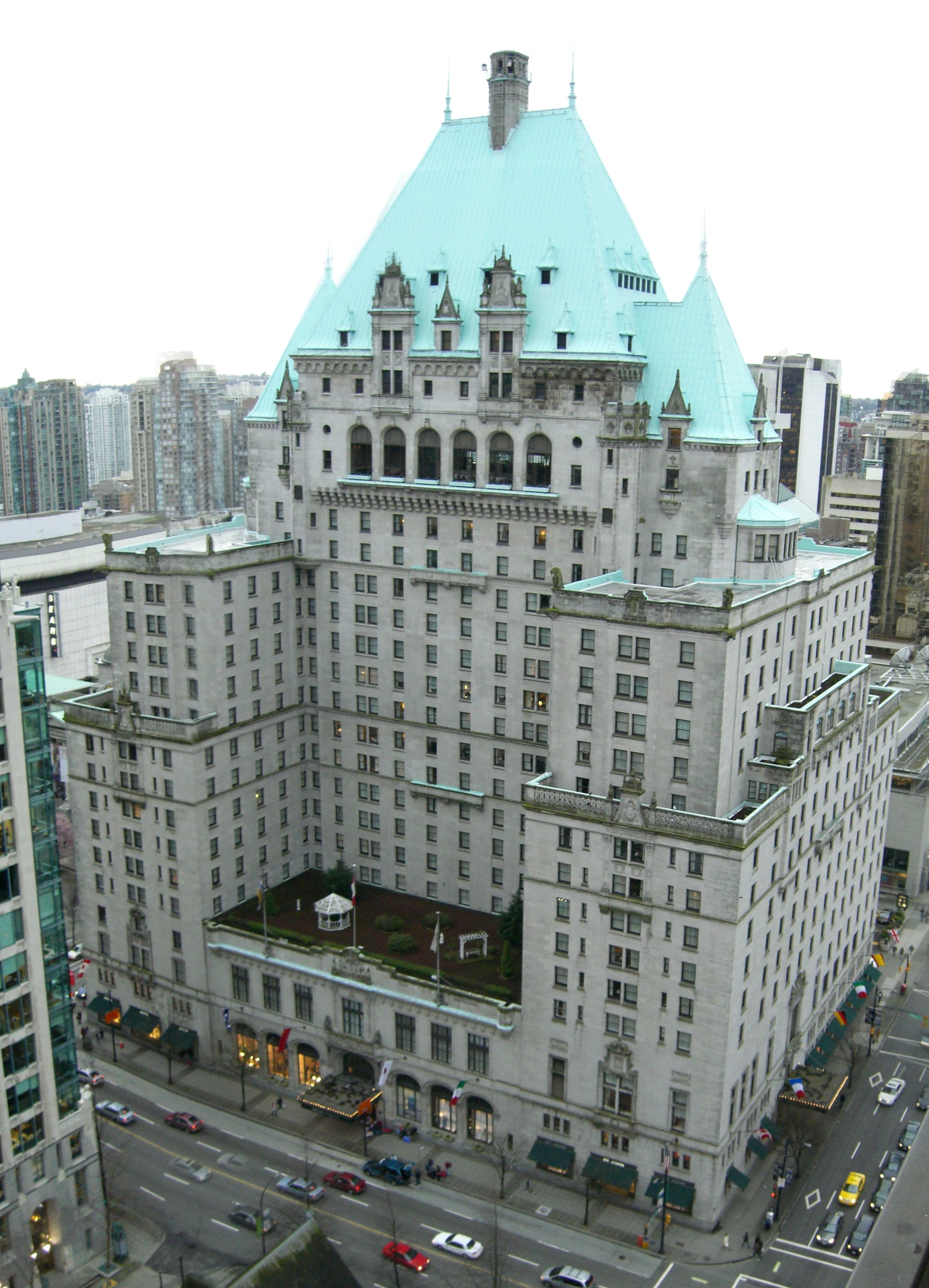
- Present day Hotel Vancouver
- Former names: Hotel Vancouver (1939–2001)

Record height
- Tallest in Vancouver from 1939 to 1972^{[I]}
- Preceded by: Marine Building
- Surpassed by: TD Tower

General information
- Architectural style: Châteauesque
- Location: 900 West Georgia Street; Vancouver, British Columbia; V6C 2W6
- Coordinates: 49.283839°N 123.120959°W
- Construction started: December 1928
- Opening: May 28, 1939
- Owner: Larco Enterprises
- Operator: Fairmont Hotels and Resorts

Height
- Architectural: 110.64 m (363.0 ft)
- Tip: 112.47 m (369.0 ft)

Technical details
- Floor count: 17

Design and construction
- Architect: Archibald and Schofield
- Developer: Canadian National Railway

Other information
- Number of rooms: 507
- Number of restaurants: 1

Website
- www.fairmont.com/hotel-vancouver/

The Fairmont Hotel Vancouver, formerly and still informally called the Hotel Vancouver, is a historic hotel in Vancouver, British Columbia. The hotel is situated within the city's Financial District, on West Georgia Street in Downtown Vancouver. The hotel was designed by two architects, John Smith Archibald, and John Schofield. The hotel is currently managed by Fairmont Hotels and Resorts.

Opened in May 1939, the Châteauesque-styled building is considered one of Canada's grand railway hotels. The hotel stands 112.47-metre-tall (369.0 ft), and contains 17 floors. It was the tallest building in Vancouver until the completion of TD Tower in 1972.

== Location ==
Hotel Vancouver sits at 900 West Georgia Street, within the Financial District, the central business district of Downtown Vancouver. The hotel property is bounded by Burrard Street to the northwest, West Georgia Street to the northeast, and Hornby Street to the southeast. To the southwest, the hotel property is bounded by two buildings, including 750 Burrard Street.

The hotel is located close to several attractions in downtown Vancouver. The hotel is situated directly northwest of the Vancouver Art Gallery, as well as Robson Square, a public square adjacent to the art museum. North of the hotel also lies Christ Church Cathedral, the oldest church in the city. The hotel is also situated near two SkyTrain rapid transit stations, Burrard station, and Vancouver City Centre station.

== Design ==
=== Architecture ===
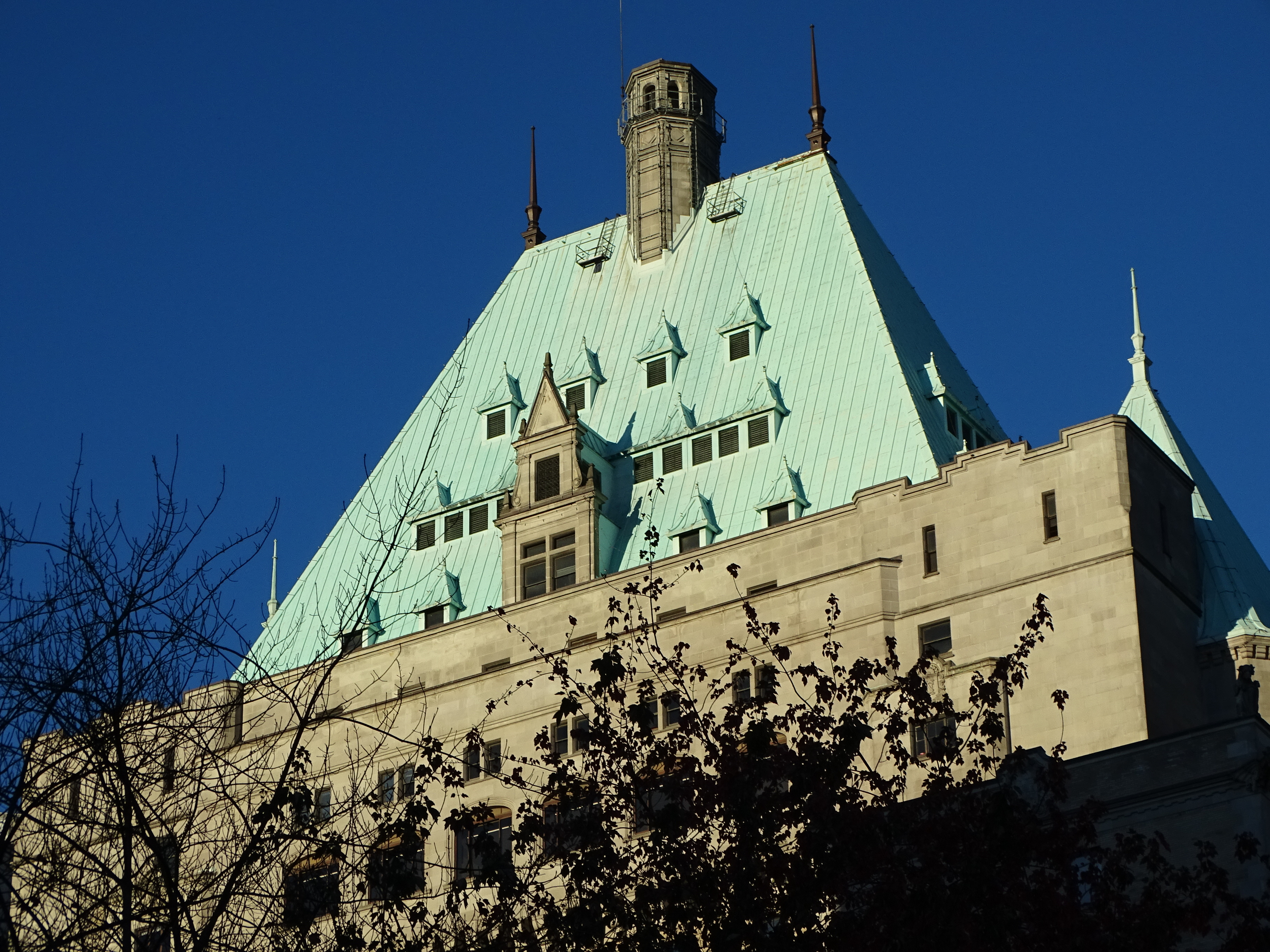
The chateauesque-styled Hotel Vancouver features a copper pitched roof with dormers.

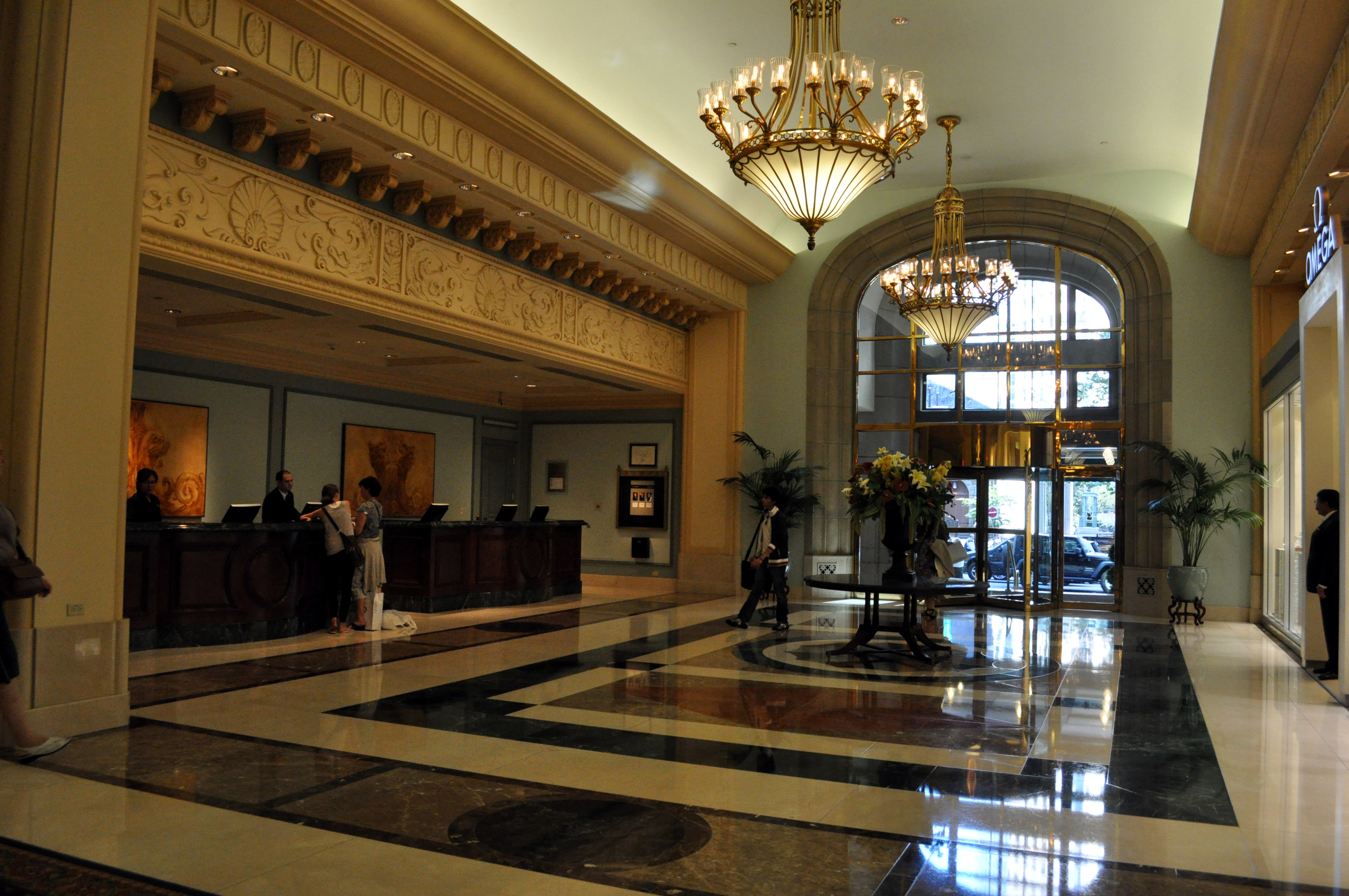
Hotel lobby in 2010 before renovation

Hotel Vancouver is one of Canada's grand railway hotels, initially built by Canadian National Railway. The building was designed by Canadian architects, John Smith Archibald, and John Schofield. Although construction for the hotel began in 1929, its completion would not occur until 1939 as a result of funding issues during Great Depression. The completion of the hotel required a joint investment into the property from Canadian Pacific Hotels, a division of Canadian Pacific Railway.

The hotel was a part of series of Chateauesque grand railway hotels built throughout Canada in the late-19th and early 20th centuries. Like the other grand railway hotels, Hotel Vancouver incorporates elements from chateaus found in France's Loire Valley. Chateauesque features found on Hotel Vancouver includes its prominent copper pitched roof with dormers, and carved stonework encompassing a steel frame. In addition to chateauesque elements found on most grand railway hotels, Hotel Vancouver also incorporates Renaissance architectural detailings, gargoyles, and relief sculptures. In 1939, a number of artists were commissioned to complete the decorative work for the building, including Olea Marion Davis, Charles Marega, Beatrice Lennie, Valentine Shabief, and Lilias Farley.

Hotel Vancouver stands 112.47-metre-tall (369.0 ft), containing 17 floors made up of guest rooms and other hotel amenities. After the building was completed in 1939, it became the tallest building in Vancouver until the completion of TD Tower in 1972.

=== Facilities ===
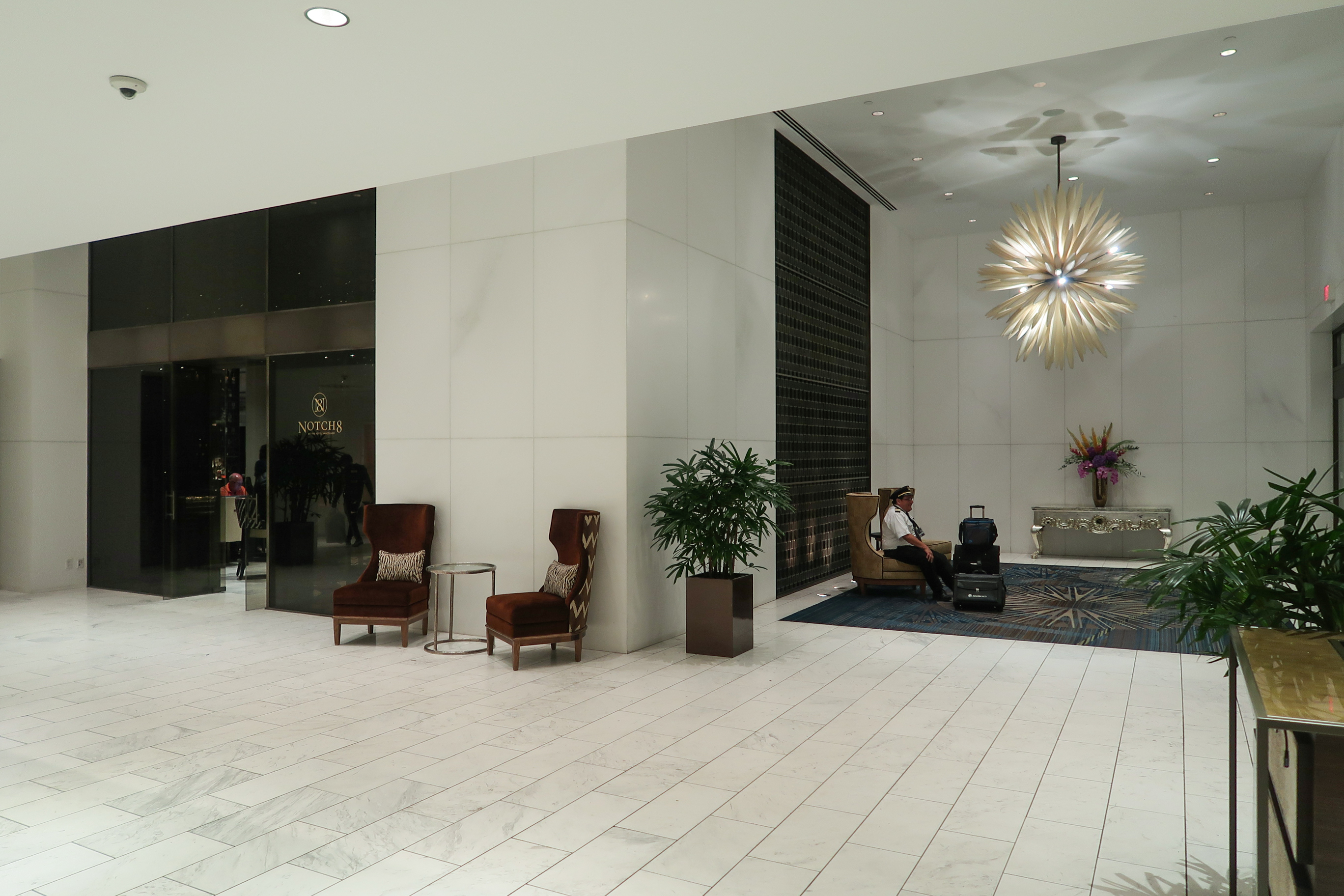
The main lobby of the hotel, with the entrance to the hotel restaurant, Notch8 Restaurant + Bar, on the left.

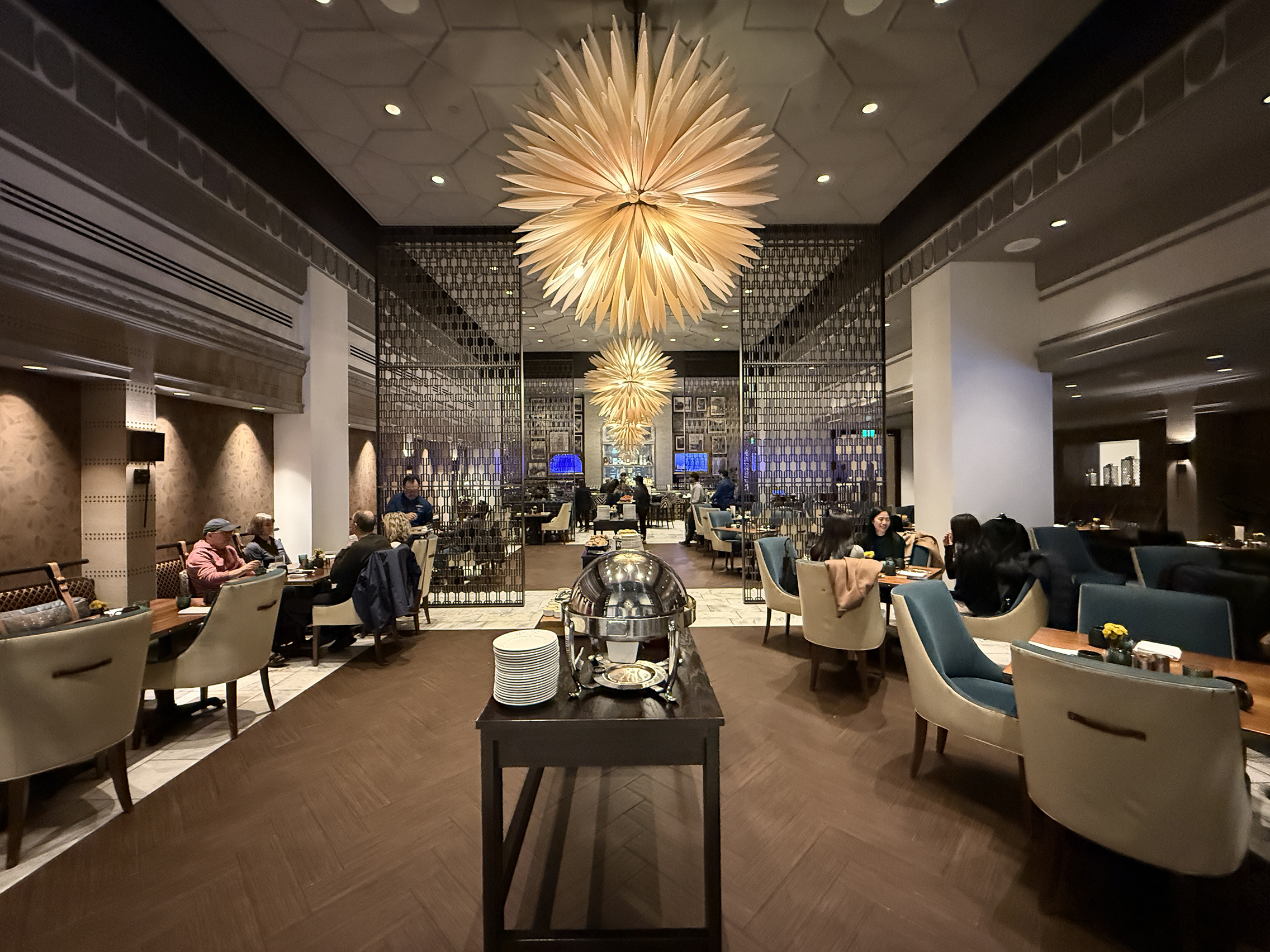
Notch8 Restaurant + Bar

The Fairmont Hotel Vancouver includes 557 guest rooms and suites spread throughout the hotel. Suites at Hotel Vancouver include the Lieutenant Governor's Suite and the Royal Suite. The Lieutenant Governor's Suite was designed with Art Deco stylings, and features black walnut veneer-panelled walls.

In 2018, the hotel announced the completion of its four-year renovation project, which saw a reworked main lobby, and guest rooms. The project also restored the 14th floor of the hotel to its original decor from 1939. Restored items on the 14th floor include English harewood doors with bronze doorplates, bronze hallway doors, sapele-panelled walls with bronze strips at its elevator lobby.

In addition to lodgings, the hotel also houses several food-based services, as well as a restaurant, Notch8 Restaurant + Bar. The restaurant also hosts the hotel's afternoon tea service. Other facilities at the hotel include a gym, swimming pool, and spa.

== History ==
Plans to develop a railway hotel at the present site of Hotel Vancouver first emerged in the 1920s, from Canadian Northern Railway. In December 1928, work on the present Hotel Vancouver commenced for Canadian National Railway. Canadian National Railway built the hotel as a result of a land deal between the city and Canadian Northern Railway, a company later acquired by Canadian National Railway. The land deal required the city to prepare tidal flats on False Creek for the construction of railway yards and Pacific Central Station. In return, the company guaranteed the construction of a large downtown hotel and made the city the western terminus for its rail network.

Shortly after the erection of the building's steel frame, however, work on the hotel was halted as a result of the Great Depression. Work resumed on the building in 1937, and in 1938 Canadian National Railway partnered with Canadian Pacific Railway to complete the new hotel. Work on the hotel was rushed to completion in time for King George VI and Queen Elizabeth's 1939 royal tour of Canada. The hotel was the third hotel in the city to use the name "Hotel Vancouver". The first and second Hotel Vancouver were both located southeast of the present hotel on West Georgia Street. In an effort to prevent competition with the new Hotel Vancouver, Canadian Pacific Railway closed its hotel operations at the second Hotel Vancouver once the new hotel opened. The second Hotel Vancouver building was torn down in 1949, after Canadian Pacific sold the property to Eaton's in December 1948.

During the mid-20th century, the Canadian Broadcasting Corporation radio stations were located within Hotel Vancouver. On May 1, 1940, Dal Richards began his career playing in an 11-piece band, alongside the then-unknown 13-year-old Juliette, at the hotel's Panorama Roof Ballroom, an event space at Hotel Vancouver. Richards became a regular performer for The Roof, a CBC Radio show broadcast from the hotel.

In 1962, Canadian National Hotels, a division of Canadian National Railway, acquired Canadian Pacific Hotels' share of the property, gaining full ownership of the hotel. On January 1, 1964, Hilton Hotels International assumed management of the hotel for CN, though it was never branded as a Hilton. CN Hotels resumed management of the hotel on January 1, 1984, after the management contract with Hilton ended. In 1988, Canadian National Hotels sold its remaining nine properties, including Hotel Vancouver, to Canadian Pacific Hotels.

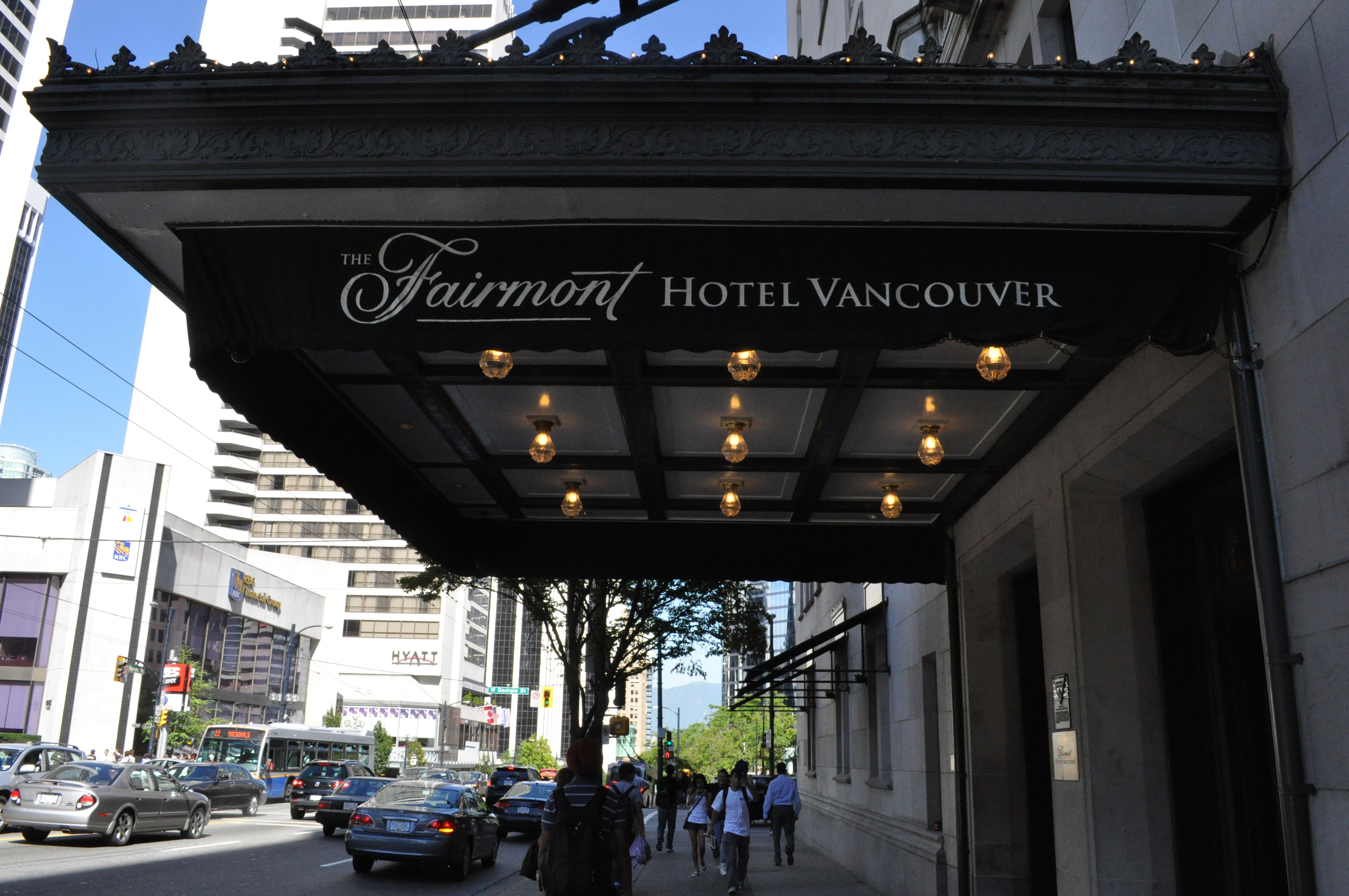
The hotel was renamed the "Fairmont Hotel Vancouver" in 2001.

In 2001, Canadian Pacific Hotels was reorganized as Fairmont Hotels and Resorts, adopting the name from an American company it had purchased in 1999. The hotel's name was changed to the Fairmont Hotel Vancouver as part of this rebranding effort. In 2007, Fairmont Hotels and Resorts sold 25 hotel properties, including Hotel Vancouver, to Caisse de dépôt et placement du Québec, although Fairmont continues to manage the hotel. In 2015, the property was sold to Larco Enterprise for C$180 million.

In preparation for the building's 80th anniversary, the hotel underwent a C$12 million renovation of the hotel lobby, restaurant, and guest rooms. The renovations took place from 2014 to 2018.

From 2005 to 2008, The Suite Life of Zack and Cody featured shots of the hotel's exterior to portray the fictional Tipton Hotel.

== See also ==
- List of heritage buildings in Vancouver
- List of tallest buildings in Vancouver

== Bibliography ==
- Kalman, Harald; Ward, Robin (2012). Exploring Vancouver: The Architectural Guide. D & M Publishers. ISBN 978-1-5536-5867-2.
