= Vancouver City Hall =

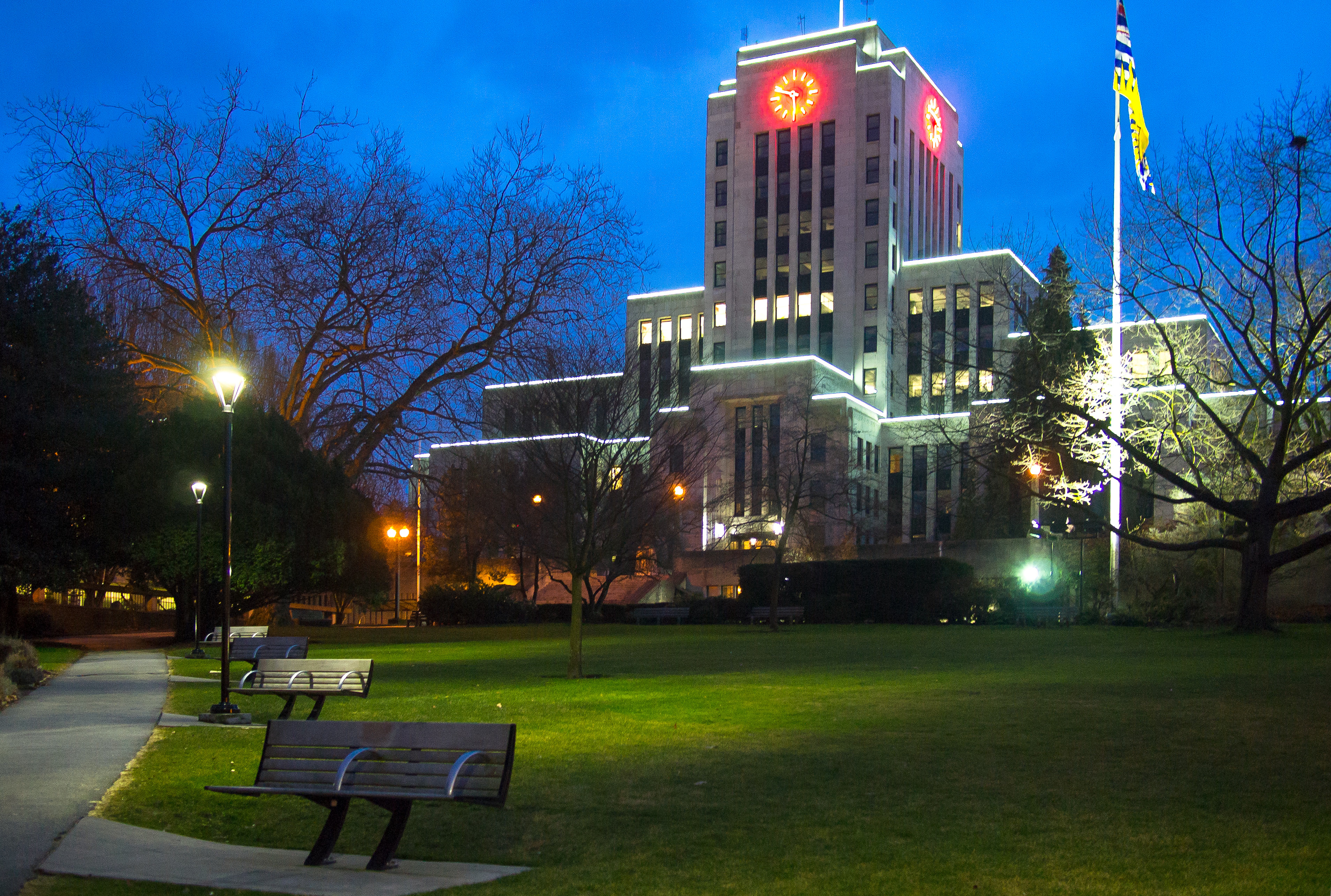
- Vancouver City Hall
- Interactive map of the Vancouver City Hall area

General information
- Type: City hall
- Architectural style: Art Deco
- Location: 453 West 12th Avenue; Vancouver, British Columbia; V5Y 1V4
- Coordinates: 49°15′39″N 123°6′50″W
- Construction started: 1935
- Completed: 1936
- Inaugurated: December 2, 1936; 89 years ago
- Cost: CA$1 million
- Owner: City of Vancouver

Height
- Height: 98 metres (322 ft)

Technical details
- Floor count: 12

Design and construction
- Architecture firm: Townley & Matheson
- Main contractor: Carter-Halls-Aldinger Company

Other information
- Public transit access: Broadway–City Hall station

Vancouver City Hall is home to Vancouver City Council in Vancouver, British Columbia, Canada. Located at 453 West 12th Avenue, the building was ordered by the Vancouver Civic Building Committee, designed by architect Fred Townley and Matheson, and built by Carter, Halls, Aldinger and Company. The building has a 12-storey tower (the point is 98 metres [322 ft] tall) with a clock on the top.

The building is served by Broadway–City Hall station on the SkyTrain's Canada Line.

== History ==
Between 1897 and 1929, the Vancouver City Hall was located on Main Street, just south of the Carnegie Library; that building had previously served as a public market and an auditorium. In 1929, City Hall moved into the Holden Building (built 1911), while the Main Street building became an extension of the Carnegie Library.

After being elected mayor in 1934, Gerry McGeer appointed a three-man committee to select the location for a new city hall; choices included the former Central School site at Victory Square, and Strathcona Park at the corner of Cambie Street and West 12th Avenue (no relation to the current park in the Strathcona neighbourhood). The panel recommended the Strathcona Park site, and City Council approved the selection in 1935, making Vancouver the first major Canadian city to locate its city hall outside its downtown.

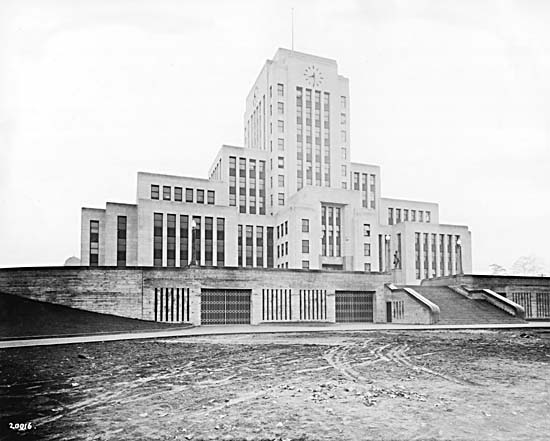
City Hall a month before opening

Construction of the new City Hall began in 1936 (Vancouver's Golden Jubilee) on January 3, and the first cornerstone was laid by McGeer on July 2. A 2.4-metre (8 ft) statue of Capt. George Vancouver, by Charles Marega, was placed at the front of the building. It was unveiled on August 20 by the visiting Lord Mayor of London, Percy Vincent. Vincent also presented several gifts to the city, including a civic mace, and a sprig "... from a tree in the orchard where a falling apple gave Isaac Newton the idea that led to his theory of gravity". The mace and the statue still reside at city hall.

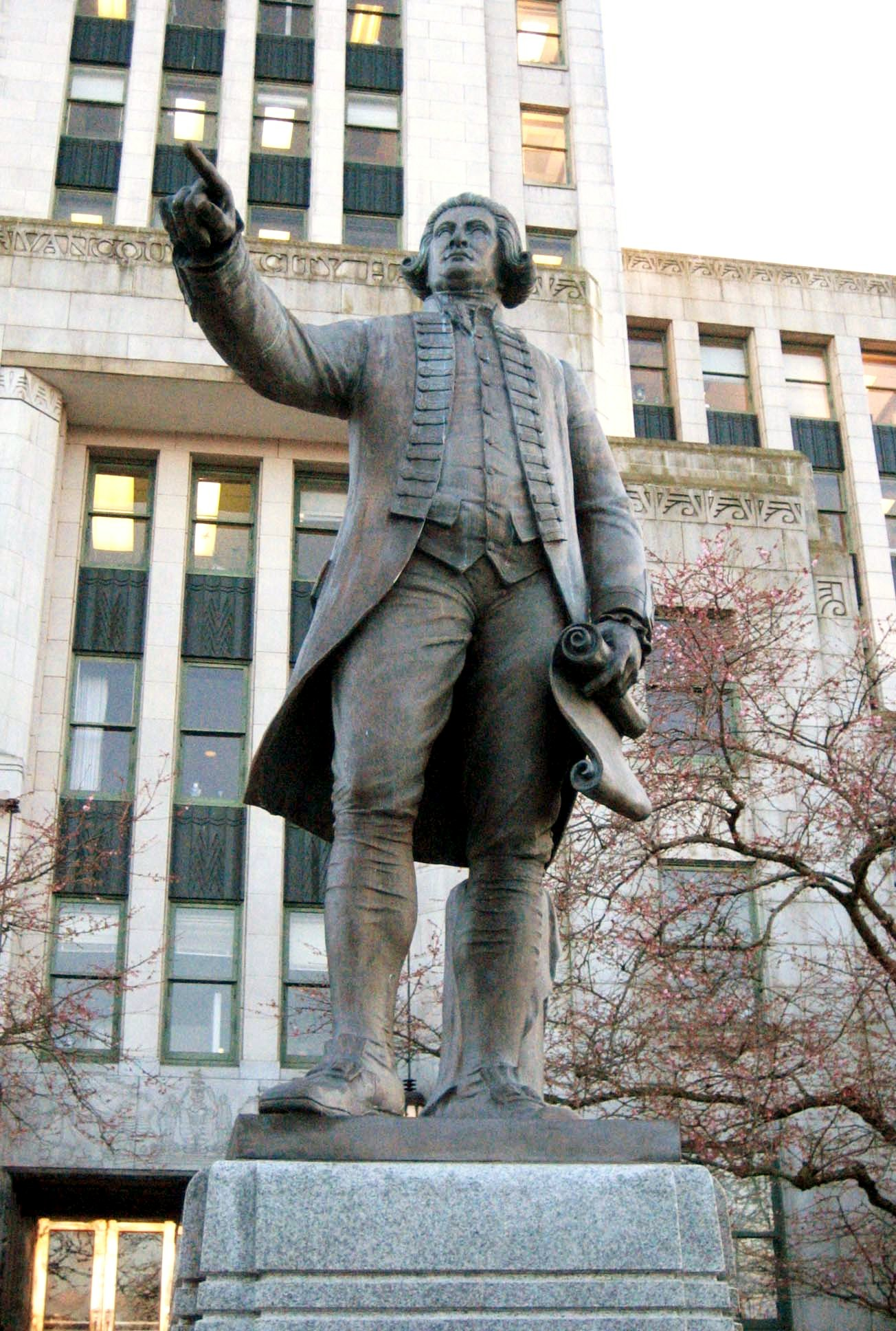
A statue of George Vancouver in front of City Hall

Construction cost CA$1 million and was completed on December 1, 1936, allowing the building to be opened in the same year as construction began. Each lock plate on the outer doors displays the Vancouver Coat of Arms, and each door knob bears the monogram of the building. The ceiling on the second floor of the rotunda was made of gold leaf from several British Columbia mines.

After winning the civic election on December 9, 1936, George Clark Miller became the first mayor of Vancouver to occupy the then-new city hall, on January 2, 1937.

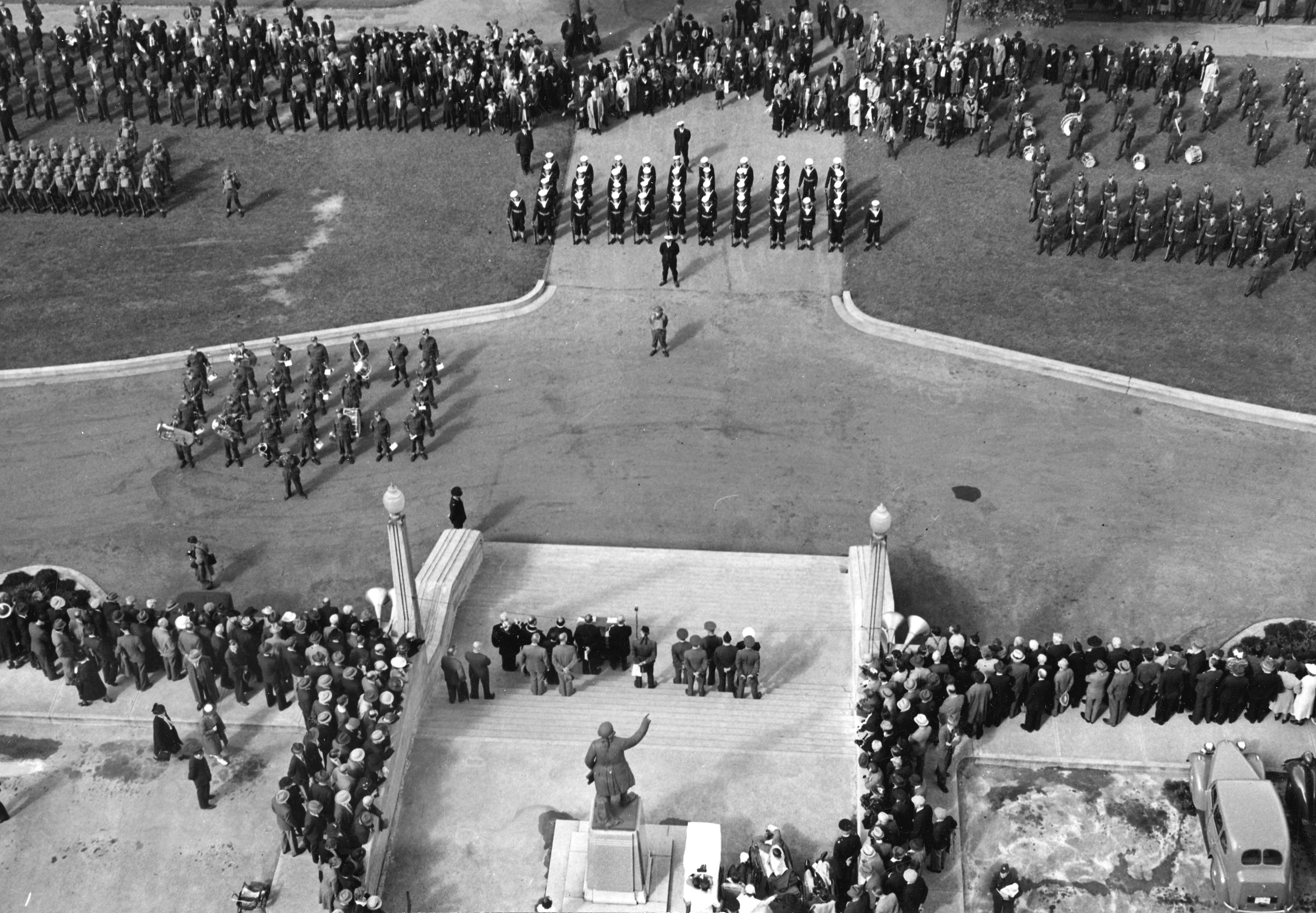
Eric Hamber, the lieutenant governor of British Columbia, announcing Canada's entry into the war on September 10, 1939

Construction on a four-storey east wing began in 1968 and was completed in 1970. In 2012, city staff gradually started moving out when a study found it would not withstand an earthquake. In 1969, a coat of arms was added, and the original building was declared a Schedule A heritage building in March 1976.

== See also ==
- List of old Canadian buildings
- List of heritage buildings in Vancouver
- Vancouver City Council
