= Café Riche (disambiguation) =

Café Riche is a café in downtown Cairo, Egypt.

Café Riche may also refer to:

- Café Riche, Paris, a former restaurant in Paris
- Café Riche, Pretoria, a restaurant in Pretoria, South Africa
