= Statue of George Vancouver (Vancouver) =

Statue in Vancouver, British Columbia, Canada

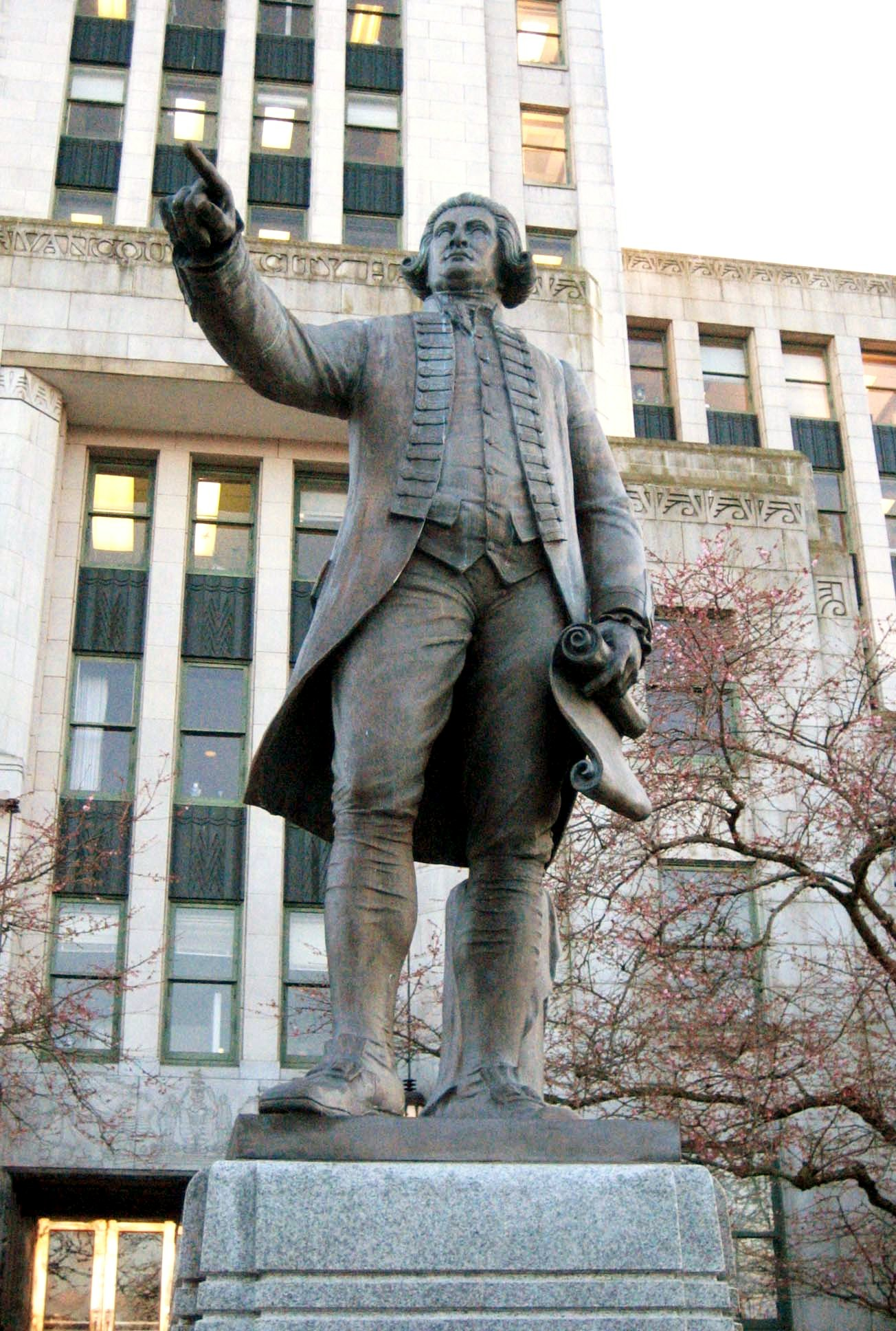
- The statue in 2006
- Artist: Charles Marega
- Location: Vancouver, British Columbia, Canada; 49°15′40″N 123°06′50″W

A statue of George Vancouver by Italian-born artist Charles Marega stands outside the Vancouver City Hall, in Vancouver, British Columbia. The sculpture was unveiled in 1936 by Sir Percy Vincent.

== History ==
The statue was vandalized in 2020.
