= Lilias Farley =

Canadian artist (1907–1989)

Lilias Marianne Ar de Soif Farley (May 2, 1907 – August 2, 1989) was a Canadian painter, sculptor, designer, and muralist in realism and abstraction. In 1967, she was awarded the Centennial Medal for Service to the Nation in the Arts. She was an alumna of the Vancouver School of Decorative and Applied Arts (now the Emily Carr University of Art and Design) and was a member of the school's first graduating class.

== Early life and career ==
Farley was born in Ottawa, Canada and moved to Vancouver with her family in 1924. She became a student at the Vancouver School of Decorative and Applied Art in 1925 and received her diploma in design in 1929. At the Vancouver School of Art, she studied design with James W. G. "Jock" Macdonald and drawing with Frederick Horsman Varley, as well as interacting with Charles Marega. In her third or fourth year, she received a scholarship in design.

Farley also studied architectural sculpture at the University of British Columbia and completed post-graduate studies in theatre design and puppetry. In addition to Macdonald and Varley, Farley's work was influenced by stage and costume designer Harry Tauber, who studied extensively in Berlin and then Vienna with Josef Hoffman; Croatian sculptor and architect Ivan Meštrović, and Austrian puppeteer Richard Teschner, among others. She primarily worked in the media of wood, stone, and mosaic.

By the 1930s, Farley began to show her work at the Vancouver Art Gallery and from 1933–1935 she taught classes in design at the newly opened British Columbia College of Art. Farley was a founding member of the Federation of Canadian Artists in 1941. She also served as President of the Pasovas Arts Club in Vancouver, was an elected member of the Sculptors Society of Canada in the 1940s, and was elected a Life Fellow of the International Institute of Arts and Letters at Lindau, Lake of Constance in 1960. In 1948, Farley moved from British Columbia to Whitehorse, Yukon Territory, where she taught art at Whitehorse High School until 1972 and served as the first director for the Yukon of Canadian Crafts Council from 1973–1974. She resided there until her death at the age of 83.

In Vancouver, Farley painted two murals, with accompanying bronze details, for the new Hotel Vancouver in 1939 and carved patterns for the Vancouver Post Office. In Whitehorse, she painted murals of the History of the Yukon for the Supreme Court Chambers in the Federal Building in 1955. In Ottawa, she completed colour plates for the Department of Indian Affairs (now Indigenous and Northern Affairs Canada).

== Select solo exhibitions ==
- Vancouver Art Gallery, 1946. This exhibition included the following works by Farley: Figure in Black, Obeisance, Medieval Maiden, Dance Patterns, Pavanne, Spring Form, and The End of the Shift.
- Whitehorse Public Library, Yukon Territory, 1986. The exhibition was titled Lilias Farley: A Retrospect.

== Exhibited work ==
Pasovas Arts Club, Vancouver Art Gallery: In 1930, Farley exhibited several works, including a watercolor titled Tree Panel, as well as sculptures and other designs. In 1932, she showed marionettes, sketches, and designs from her work on The Witch Doctor, a play created with Harry Tauber's Marionette Players. The following year, she showed several figure designs and two wood figure carvings.

British Columbia Artists Annual, Vancouver Art Gallery: Farley exhibited various sculptures in the following years: 1932, 1934–1937, 1941, 1945.

Royal Canadian Academy of Arts, Art Association of Montreal: In 1937, Farley showed two sculptures: Meditation and Obeisance. In 1939, she exhibited the sculptures Carved Head and Dance Pattern. In 1946, she exhibited Leaf Unfolding and the following year she showed two sculptures: Fronds and The Sister. In 1953, she showed the works Angel and Madonna.

British Columbia Society of Fine Arts, Vancouver Art Gallery: In 1937, Farley showed Meditation and Obeisance. In 1938, she showed two sculptures: Spring Form and Native Dance. In 1939, she exhibited the sculpture Head and two photographs of sketches for her mural in the Hotel Vancouver, which were completed that same year. The following year, she exhibited Dance Pattern, along with several graphic arts. In 1941, she exhibited the sculpture Decorative Figure. In 1942, she exhibited three watercolours as well as photographs of a sculpture that had been purchased by IBM, New York. The next year, she exhibited a drawing of her work Carving in Mahogany. In 1946, she showed Leaf Unfolding, the following year she exhibited Fronds, and the year after that she showed Figure in White Mahogany. Farley also exhibited various sculptures in the following years: 1950, 1952–1953, 1959.

British Columbia Society of Artists, Vancouver Art Gallery: Farley exhibited various sculptures in the following years; 1937–1939, 1940–1944, 1946–1949, 1952, 1960, 1967.

British Columbia Artists' Summer Exhibition, Vancouver Art Gallery: In 1942, Farley exhibited a wood carving titled Native Dancer.

Art Gallery of Toronto, (now Art Gallery of Ontario): In 1936, Farley showed Head and Carvings in Mahogany. In 1938, she showed two wooden sculptures: Madonna and Medieval Maiden at the Sculptor's Society of Canada Exhibition. She also exhibited work in 1946.

Other exhibitions that Farley participated in include:

- Sculptors Society of Canada, 1940s
- Northwest Institute Sculpture Annual Exhibition, Vancouver Art Gallery, 1956.
- Canadian National Exhibition, Toronto, 1956.
- British Columbia Sculpture, University of British Columbia, 1958.

== Professional affiliations ==
- British Columbia Society of Fine Arts, 1938.
- Vancouver Arts and Letters Club.
- Pasovas Arts Club, 1930.

== Awards ==
- "Highly commended" for textile designs, British Empire Industrial Arts Exhibition, London, England, 1930
- First prize Labour Arts Award for the sculpture End of the Shift, British Columbia at Work Exhibition, 1945
- Centennial Medal for Service to the Nation in the Arts, 1967
- Yukon Commissioner's Award for outstanding contributions, 1983
