= Joe Fortes =

British-Canadian lifeguard

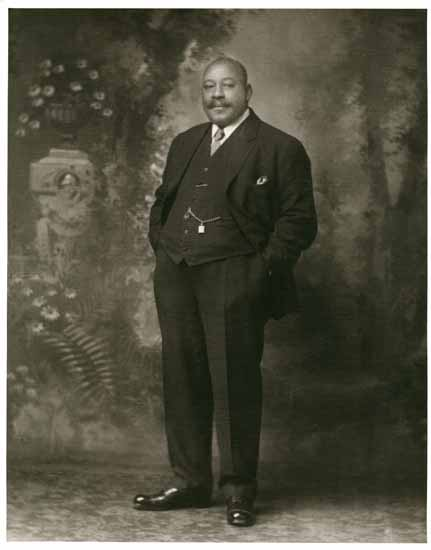
- Joe Fortes in Vancouver, 1910
- Born: Joseph Seraphim Fortes; February 9, 1863; Port of Spain, Trinidad and Tobago
- Died: February 4, 1922 (aged 58); Vancouver, British Columbia
- Occupation: Lifeguard

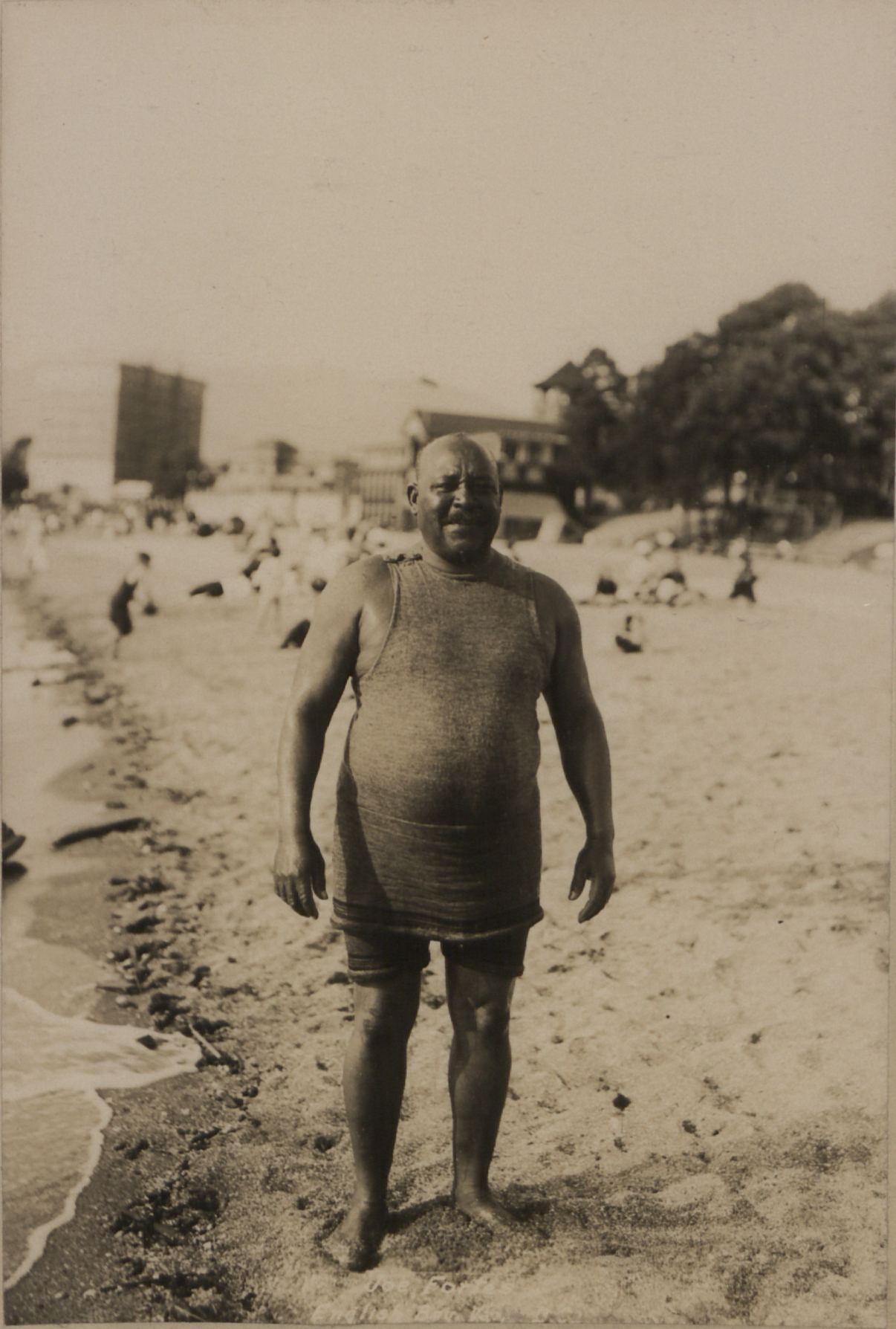
Joe Fortes standing on the beach at English Bay, Vancouver, Canada. This portrait was part of a collage in a Canada Post Stamp that honoured him.

Joseph Seraphim Fortes (9 February 1863 – 4 February 1922) was a British-Canadian lifeguard. He was a prominent figure in the early history of Vancouver, and the city's first official lifeguard.

== Early life ==
Joe Fortes was born in 1863 in Port of Spain, Trinidad. His father was a Barbadian "of full African blood" and his mother was "entirely or largely" Spanish or Portuguese. At 17 Fortes left Trinidad for England. Residing for five years in Liverpool, he learned to swim at St George's Baths, where he became a swimmer and diver of some note. He won a three-mile race across the Mersey River, received a gold medal for life-saving, and exhibited his talents as part of an 11-person swim team in a tour of English and French seaside resorts. In 1884 he sailed around Cape Horn from Liverpool on the Robert Kerr, arriving in Burrard Inlet, a coastal fjord in southwestern British Columbia, in September 1885. His name occurs repeatedly in the ship's log as Seraphim Fortes.

== Arrival in Vancouver ==
Fortes came to Granville (Vancouver) on the Robert Kerr, debarking on September 30, 1885. Making his home at English Bay, he lived in a tent on the beach during the milder months of the year. After the start of the 20th century, he moved into a cottage at the foot of Bidwell Street on the shore-side of Beach Avenue. His little house was later moved to the other side of the street, just east of Alexandra Park.

== Lifeguarding in English Bay ==
Fortes ran Vancouver's earliest shoeshine stand, in the Sunnyside Hotel on Water Street. Afterwards, he worked as a bartender and porter at such local establishments as the Bodega Saloon on Carrall Street in Strathcona and the Alhambra Hotel at the corner of Carrall and Water. Known to be clean, sober, and an expert mixer of cocktails, he was most famous, however, for his volunteer work as a swimming instructor and lifeguard. In 1886, during the Great Vancouver Fire, he saved the wife and 8-year-old son of a member of parliament. He was a common sight at English Bay beach, where he taught thousands of children to swim. It was not until around 1897 that the city, in recognition of his services, put him on its payroll as a lifeguard; at some point, he was also made a special police constable. He reputedly saved more than 100 people from drowning.

His contemporaries referred to him respectfully and lovingly as "Old Black Joe" or "English Bay Joe". The stocky, dark-skinned man was a friend and teacher to the children, a guard for the bathers and a hero to people in distress. He has been officially credited with saving 29 lives, yet it is believed that the real number is considerably higher.

In 1910, the City honoured Joe Fortes for his many years of service to the public by presenting him with a gold watch, a cheque, and an illuminated address.

== Legacy ==
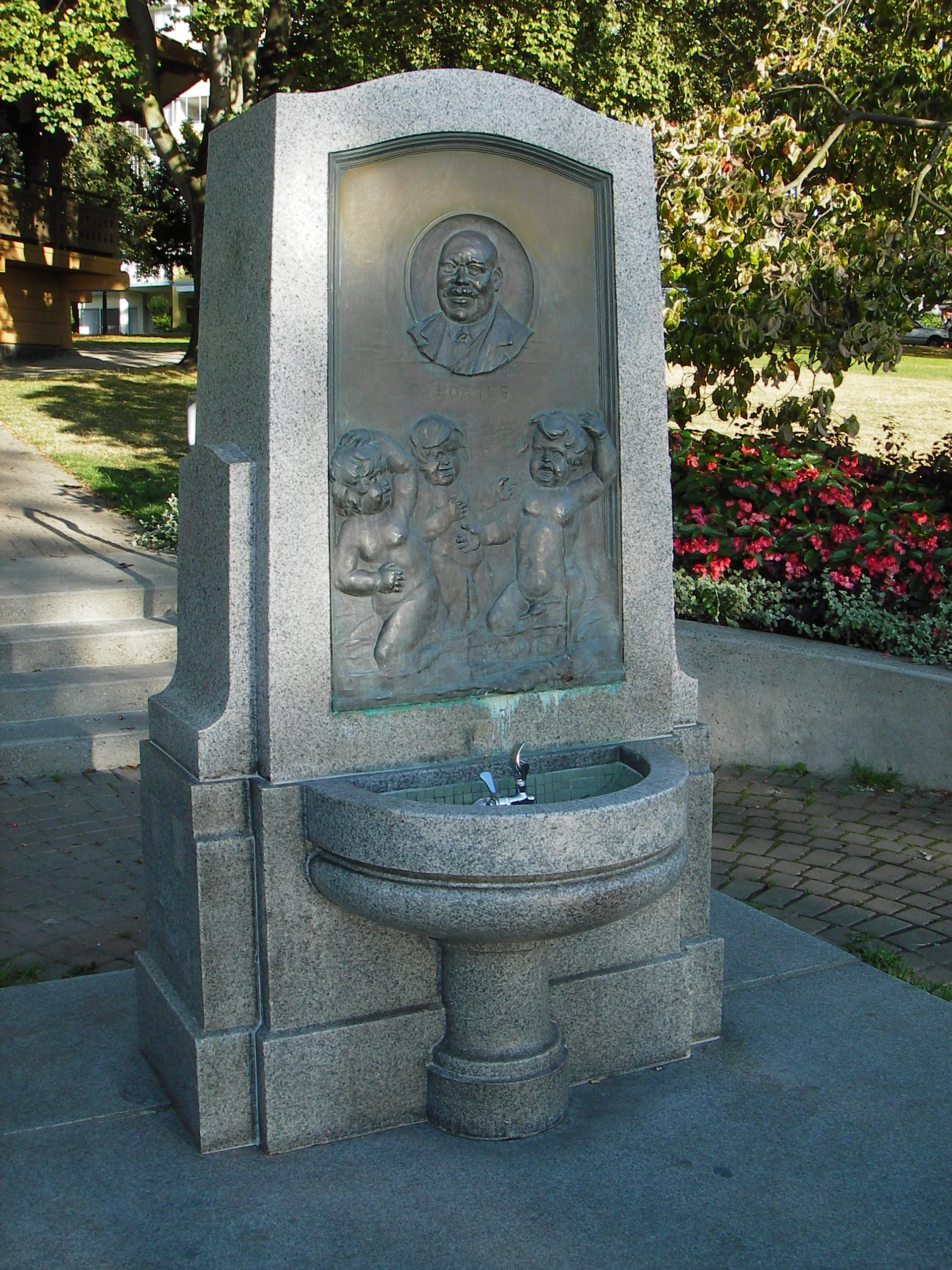
Joe Fortes Memorial Drinking Fountain in the West End's Alexandra Park by sculptor Charles Marega

Fortes died on February 4, 1922, at Vancouver General Hospital from a paralytic stroke, about three weeks after being admitted for pneumonia. A record-breaking funeral procession was held for him. Mourners crowded into Holy Rosary Cathedral to bid farewell to a brave, kind and modest friend. Fortes was buried in Mountain View Cemetery. A flat stone marks his grave, simply inscribed: "JOE".

On June 24, 1927, the citizens of Vancouver dedicated a monument to Joe Fortes. The fountain in Alexandra Park by sculptor Charles Marega bears the inscription: LITTLE CHILDREN LOVED HIM.

On May 20, 1976, the Joe Fortes Branch of the Vancouver Public Library was dedicated to his name and in 1985, one hundred years after he arrived in Canada, the Joe Fortes Seafood & Chop House restaurant opened.

In 1986, during Vancouver's centennial year, the Vancouver Historical Society named Joseph Seraphim Fortes "Citizen of the Century."

In 2002, he was the subject of a National Film Board of Canada animated short Joe, directed by Jill Haras with a voice cast featuring Blu Mankuma.

In 2013, Canada Post released a postage stamp of Joe Fortes on February 1 celebrating Black History Month. The stamp's release marks the 150th anniversary of Joe's birth. The stamp was designed by Lara Minja.
