= King Edward VII Memorial Fountain =

Fountain in Vancouver

Coordinates: 49.283222°N 123.120654°W

The King Edward VII Memorial Fountain is a fountain in Vancouver, British Columbia, Canada. Next To The Vancouver Art Gallery,

== History ==
It was erected in 1912 to commemorate the King’s passing. Members of the Imperial Order of Daughters of the Empire commissioned sculptor Charles Marega to create the feature. It stood outside the courthouse, now the Vancouver Art Gallery in a prominent location until 1966. In 1966 it was moved into storage to make way for a new feature, the B.C Centennial Fountain. The fountain was supposed to be moved to King Edward Street and Cambie Street but the Vancouver Park Board did not have the budget for cleaning, moving and installing the King Edward fountain and so it ended up in storage until 1983. It now resides on the west side of the Vancouver Art Gallery, facing Hornby Street.

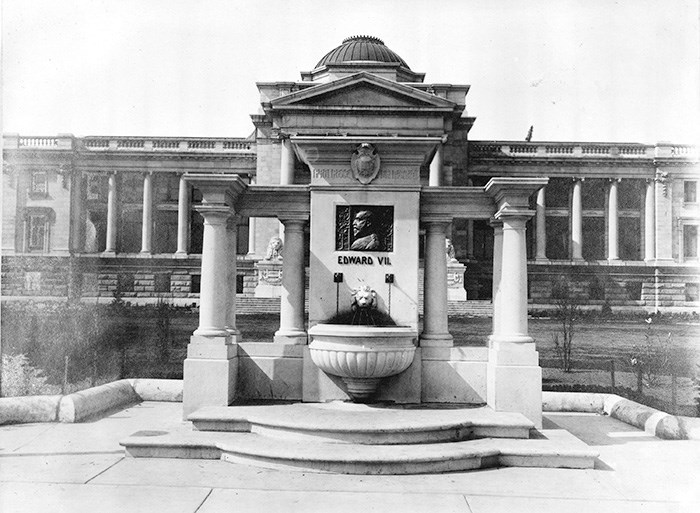
The fountain In 1912
