= Standard Bank Building =

Building in Marshalltown, Johannesburg

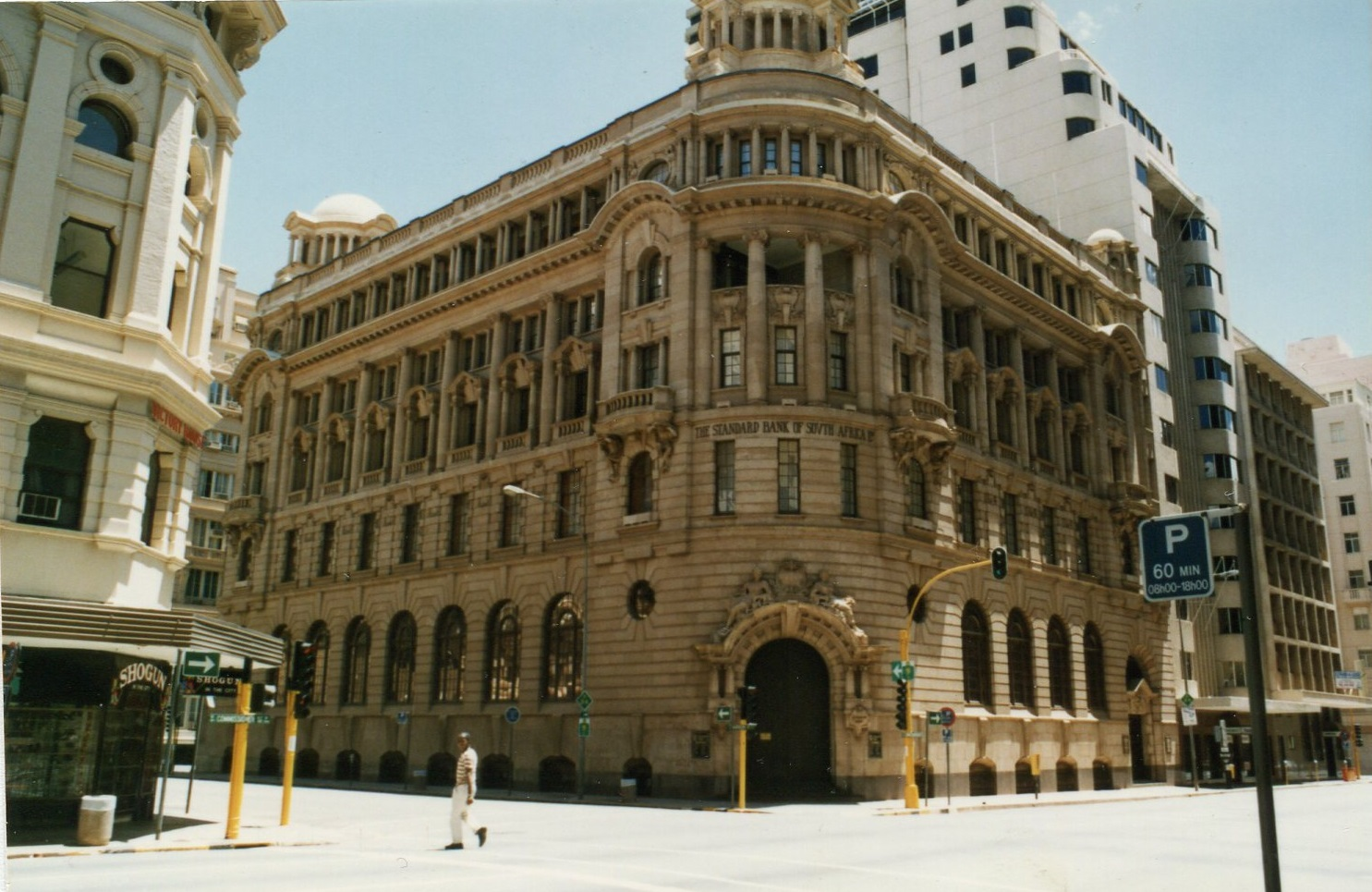
- The Standard Bank Building, cnr Harrison and Commissioner Str Johannesburg

General information
- Status: Completed
- Type: Business-use
- Location: Johannesburg, South Africa
- Completed: 10 November 1908; 116 years ago

Height
- Roof: 102 metres (335 ft)

Technical details
- Floor count: 5

Design and construction
- Architect(s): W H Stucke & W E Bannister

The Standard Bank Building (10 November 1908) was designed by Architects Stucke & Bannister. It is found in Marshalltown in the South African city of Johannesburg in Commissioner, Harrison and Fox streets

== Design ==
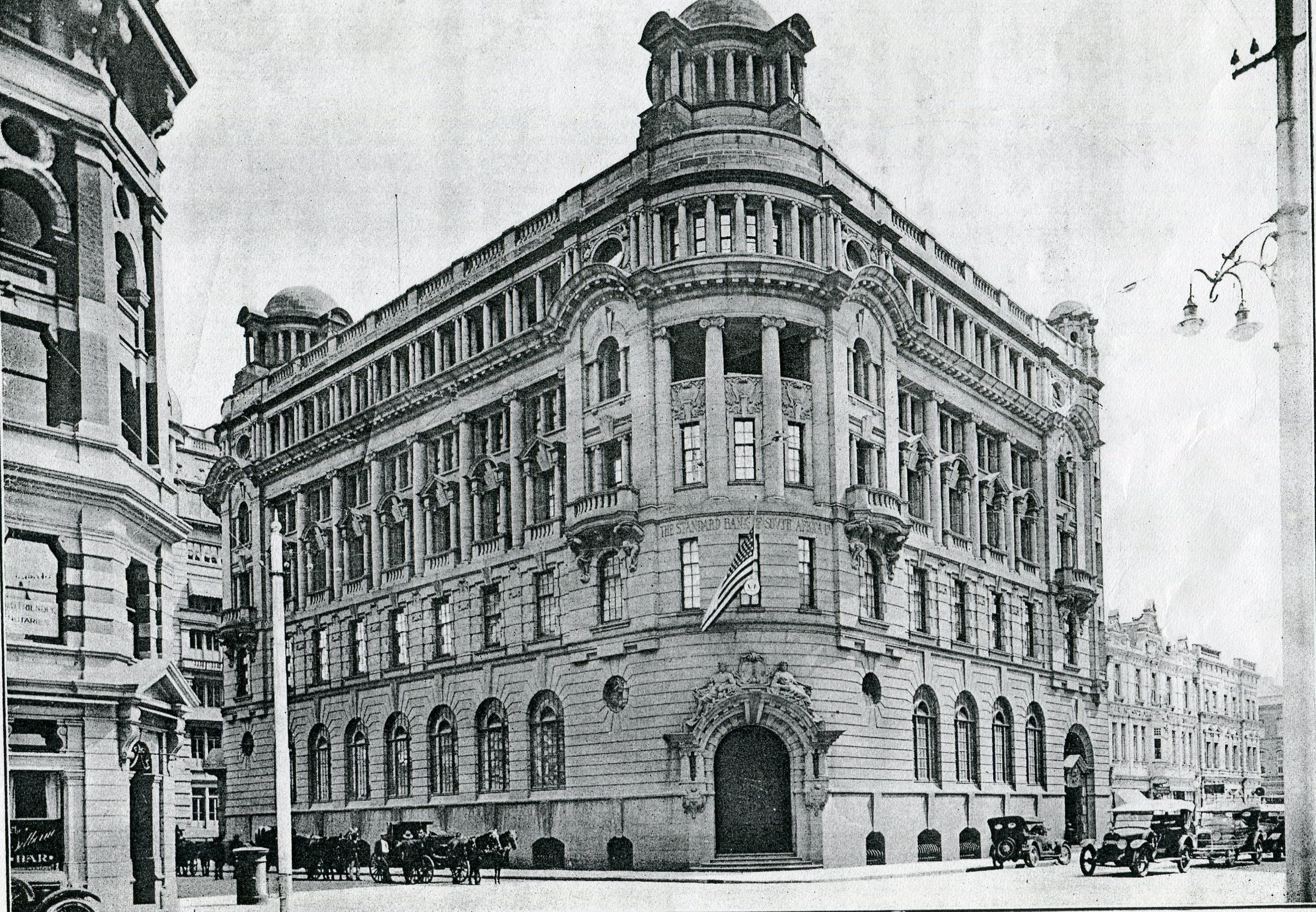
An American flag flying at half mast after the death of president Warren G. Harding in August 1923

The building has a handsome stone-faced design in the neo-Baroque late Victorian style or Beaux Arts Style which was beginning to dominate the New Regent Street and Piccadilly in London at the end of the 19th century. It is a formal and stately five-story building with an excess of neo-Baroque ornamentation on the facade in a rather dry, rationalized manner. It creates an impersonal, monumental impression, ideally suited to a time which liked to express the might of the British Empire. The corners are crowned by domes supported on ionic style classical columns. The corner entrance on Commissioner and Harrison Streets is dominated by two larger than life figures. Justice and Commerce sculptured by a Greek sculpture called Marigo. The building has a skeleton of steel, the walls being filled in with brick, which was clad on the outside with sawn sandstone.

== Construction ==
Construction began in 1906 and suffered delays because frame steel orders coincided with the San Francisco earthquake. Much building material was sent to that stricken city while other customers waited. An innovation for the time was the reinforced concrete employed for the floors.
