= Archibald and Schofield =

Practice information
- Key architects: John S. Archibald, John Schofield

Significant works and honors
- Buildings: Bessborough Hotel, Hotel Vancouver
- Design: Canadian National Hotels for the Canadian National Railway

Archibald and Schofield was a collaborative relationship between Canadian architects John Smith Archibald and John Schofield. They designed for the Canadian National Hotels for the Canadian National Railway.

John Smith Archibald (1872–1934) first trained with local architect William Maclntosh in his home town of Inverness, Scotland. In 1893 he emigrated to Canada and worked with Edward Maxwell in Montreal as a draughtsman and assistant. In 1897 he formed a partnership with another former Maxwell draughtsman, Charles Jewett Saxe (1870–1943), which lasted until 1915. Archibald's designs included a number of stations and hotels for the Canadian National Railway. He designed sports buildings including the Montreal Forum, several schools, churches, commercial buildings, and hospitals, as well as residential buildings in Montreal and Kingston, Ontario. After his death in 1934, Archibald's practice was continued by his son Ian T. Archibald and Hugh Percival Illsley. They were later joined by Francis Orr Templeton to form the firm of Archibald, Illsley and Templeton which practised in Montreal until 1950.

John Schofield immigrated to Canada from Ireland in the early 1900s. In 1907, he became the draftsman for the Canadian Northern Railway in Winnipeg. After the Canadian National Railway formed in 1920, he was the main architect, based in Montreal. Schofield was involved in almost every design of the CNR stations and hotels. He retired in 1948.

== Commissions ==
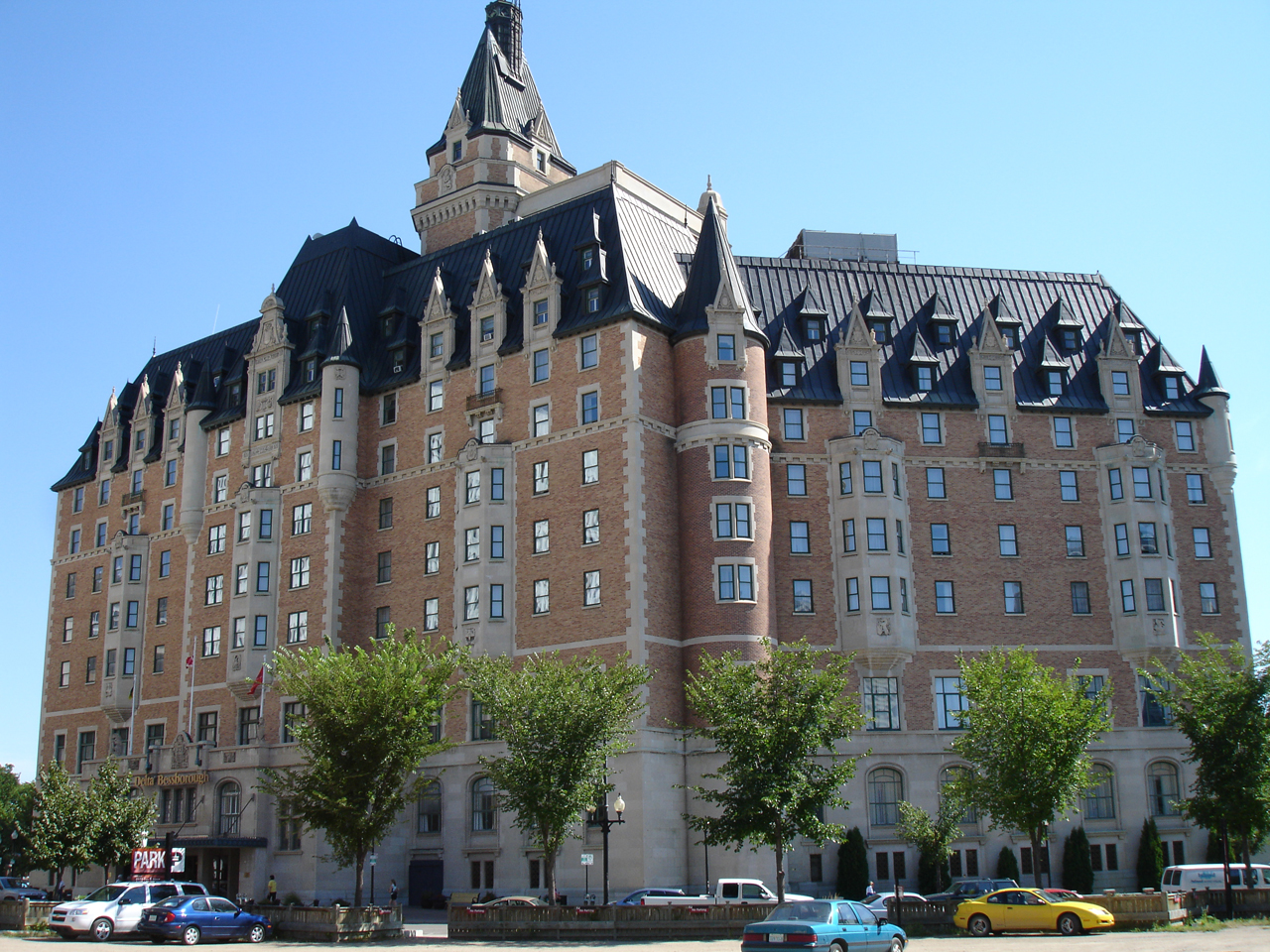
Bessborough Hotel, Saskatoon, Saskatchewan 1935

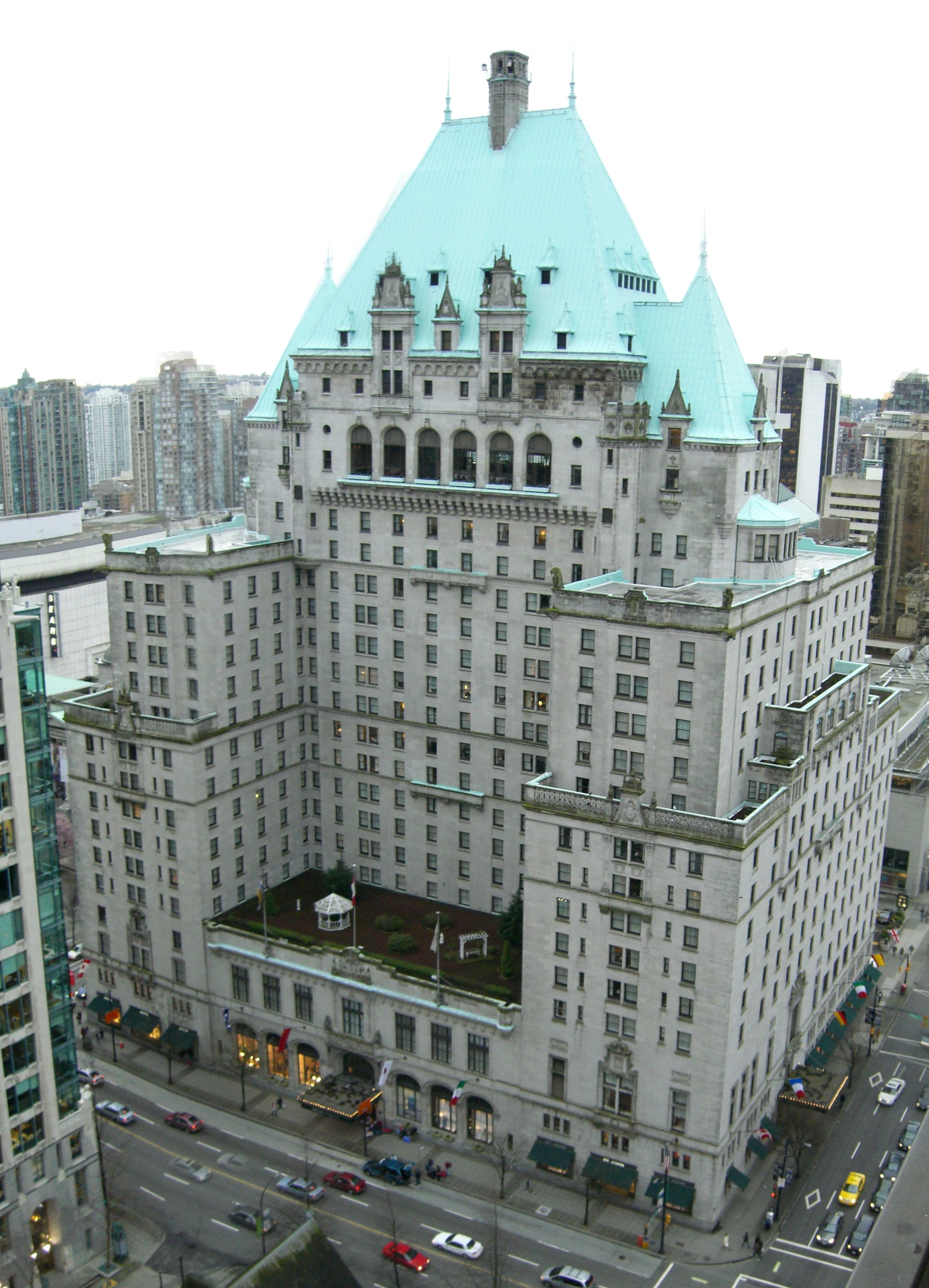
Hotel Vancouver, Vancouver, British Columbia 1939
