= Café Riche, Pretoria =

Coordinates: 25.74669°S 28.18724°E

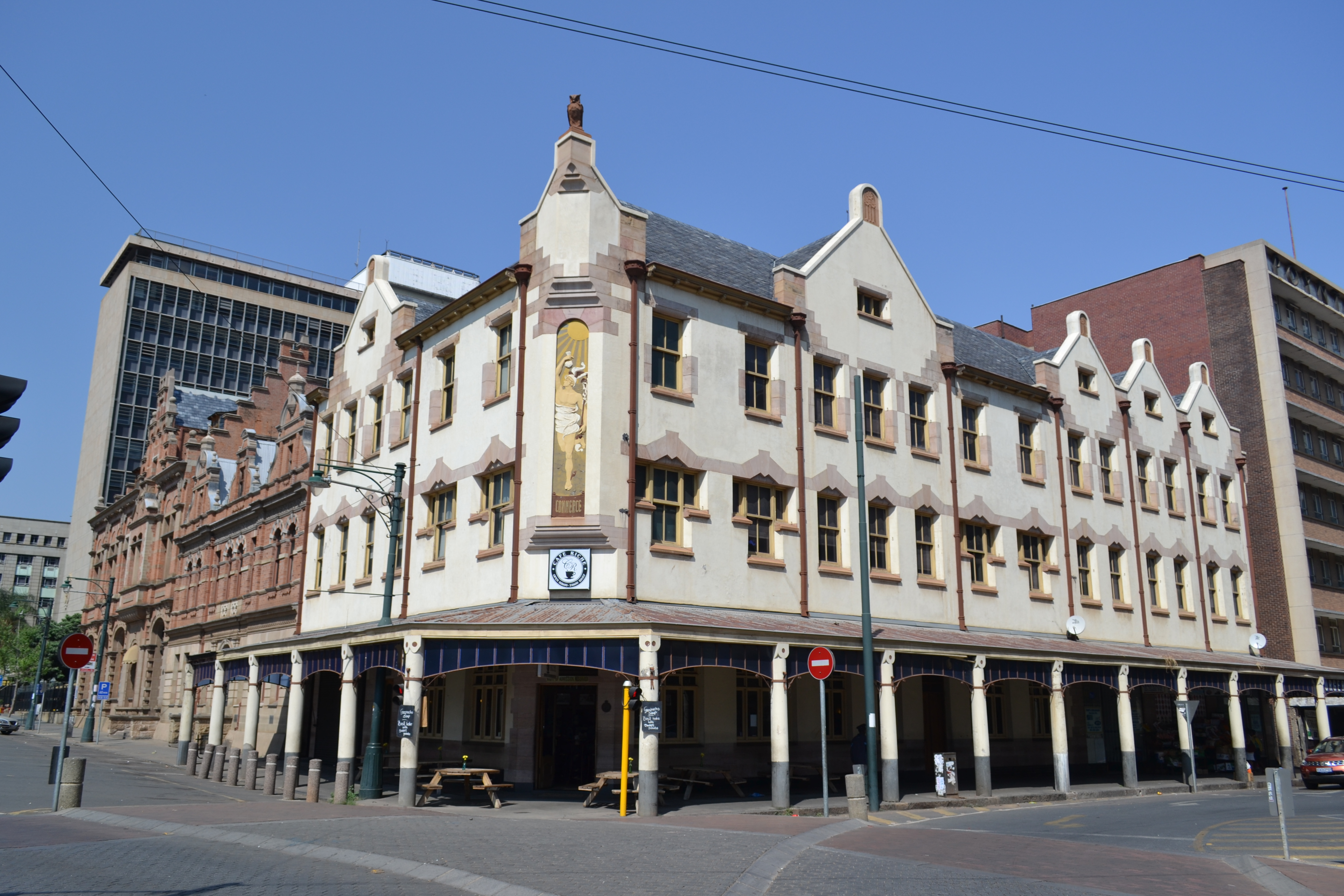

Café Riche is on the corner of Parliament and WF Nkomo (f. Church) Streets, adjoining Church Square, Pretoria, South Africa. The building was designed by the Dutch architect Frans Soff and built in 1905. Soff also designed the National Women's Monument in Bloemfontein with Anton van Wouw.

The building was originally known as the Rand Investment Building, but due to Café Riche's popularity, the original name was forgotten. Café Riche is one of the oldest restaurants in Pretoria.

The building was designed in the Art Nouveau style popular in Europe from 1894 to 1914. The stone owl on the concrete pedestal was created by Charles Marega as well as a relief artwork of 'Mercurius,' the work of Van Wouw.

The window frames and doors came from the Toringkerk, the second and last church in Church Square with a tower.

Café Riche was declared a Provincial Heritage Site and recognized under Article 34 of the National Heritage Resources Act (Law 25/1999), because it was over 60 years old.

== Water problems ==
In September 2015, the possible closure of Café Riche loomed over the building's basement office, which had been underwater as much as five years, after a storm had burst a sewage pipe in the basement. The building, owned by the Gauteng Department of Infrastructure Development, suffered damage to its foundation. New pumps were installed underneath the building, but they were stolen.

== Sources ==
- Reserve Investment Building & Cafe Riche, www.artefacts.co.za; URL accessed 11 January 2015.
