= Beatrice Lennie =

Canadian artist (1905-1987)

- Born: Edith Beatrice Catharine Lennie; June 16, 1905; Nelson, British Columbia, Canada
- Died: June 1, 1987 (aged 81); Vancouver, B.C.
- Education: Vancouver School of Decorative and Applied Arts (1925-1929)
- Known for: sculptor

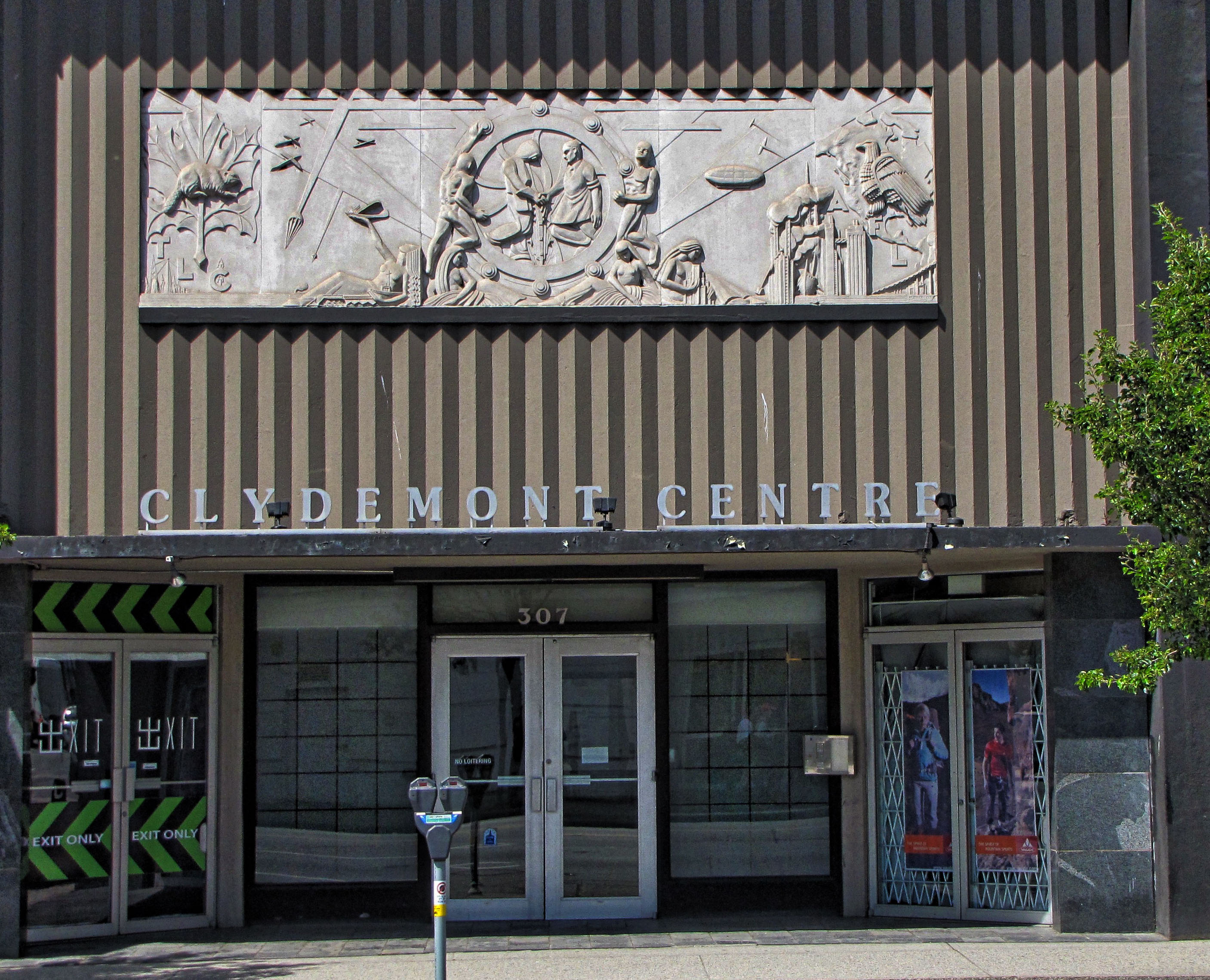
Lennie's Wheel of Industry (1949), at the Clydemont Centre, formerly the Vancouver Labour Temple.

Edith Beatrice Catharine Lennie (June 16, 1905 – June 1, 1987) was a Canadian painter and sculptor. She is primarily known for her public sculptures in Vancouver, British Columbia, many of which remain in Vancouver today. Lennie was more concerned with rendering an idea than with a realistic depiction of her subject.

== Career ==
In 1929, as a member of the original graduating class of the Vancouver School of Decorative and Applied Arts, Lennie was active in student affairs including founding the Pasovas Club "that aimed for the furtherance of art education". She served as its first president. The Pasovas Club met regularly at Bee Lennie's studio where they held life drawing sessions. In addition, they held regular exhibitions at the BC Art League Gallery at 649 Seymour Street and later at the Vancouver Art Gallery on Georgia Street.

In 1933, after her studies in California, she was invited by F. H. Varley and Jock Macdonald to teach sculpture and modeling at the newly founded, and short-lived, BC Institute of the Arts. In 1950, she sculpted a frieze and reliefs for St. John's Shaughnessy Anglican Church.

Lennie has a long exhibition history, including shows at the Vancouver Art Gallery, the Royal Canadian Academy of Arts, the British Columbia Society of Fine Arts and the Art Institute of Seattle.

Lennie stated with regards to her public commission for the Vancouver Labour Temple (1949) that:

So many people have this Victorian idea of a woman sculptor. ...They think of women 'tiddling' with pretty little figurines and vases when actually sculptoring for a living is a hard and demanding life. I spent six months on the labor mural in the workshops of a big construction company and the union men were shocked.

== Bibliography ==
- Tippett, Maria (2017). "Sculpture in Canada". Douglas & McIntyre. Archived from the original on 22 April 2021.
