= Charles Marega =

Canadian sculptor (1871–1939)

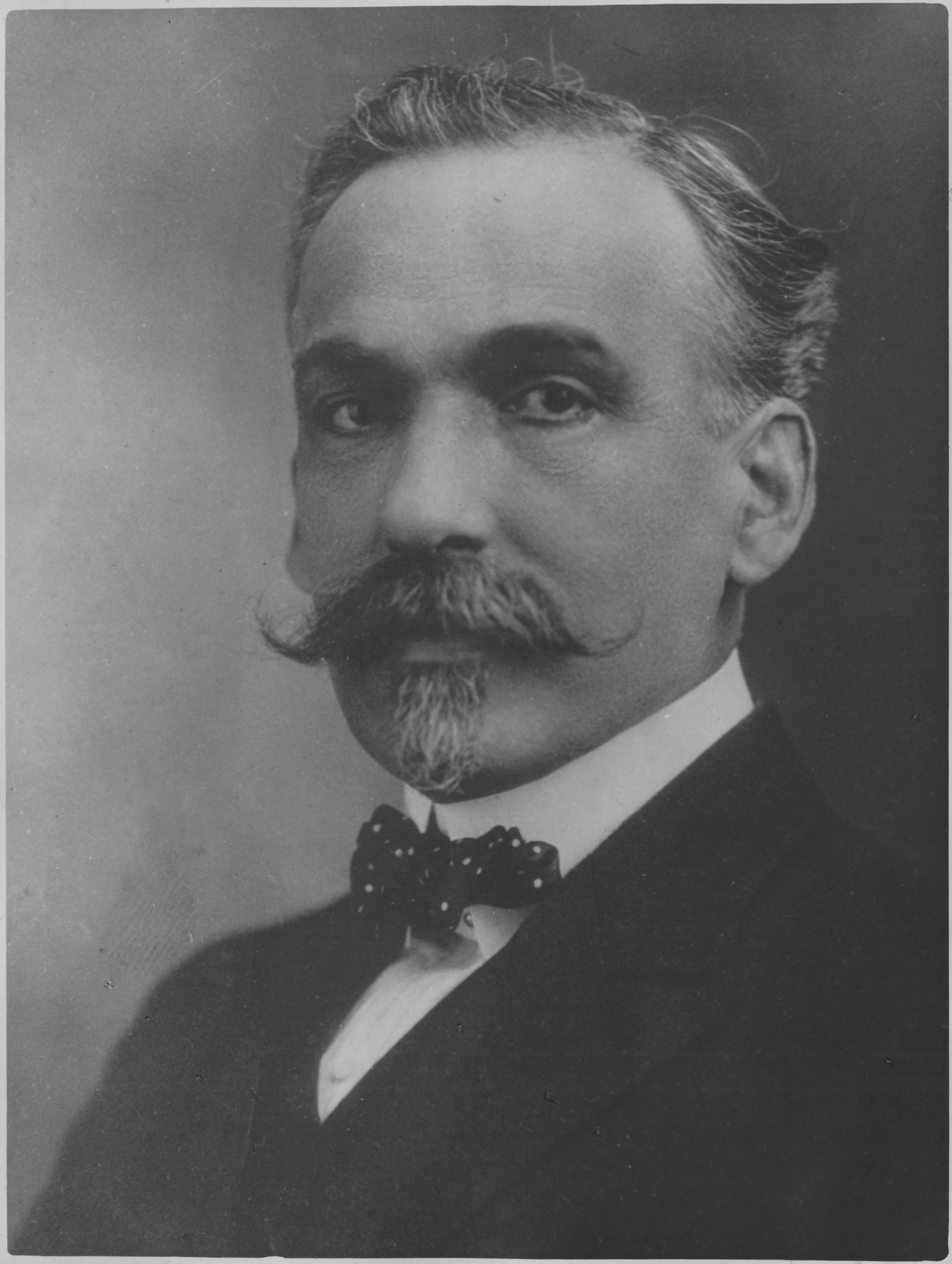
- Born: Charles Carlos Marega; September 24, 1871; Lucinico, Austria-Hungary
- Died: March 27, 1939 (aged 67); Vancouver, Canada
- Notable work: Statue of George Vancouver, King Edward VII Memorial Fountain, Owl on Café Riche, Pretoria, Lions Gate Bridge Lions Statue, Statues for the British Columbia Parliament Buildings, President Warren Harding Memorial, Joe Fortes Memorial Fountain

Charles Carlos Marega (September 24, 1871 – March 27, 1939) was a Canadian sculptor.

== Biography ==
He was born in Lucinico in the commune of Gorizia, then part of Austria-Hungary. He received training in plaster work in Mariano, Italy and then studied in Vienna and Zürich. He met Bertha in Zürich, whom he married in 1899. He worked for a while in Cape Colony and thereafter in the Transvaal Colony. In 1905, Marega and the sculptor Anton van Wouw had a company "Van Wouw & Marega Modellers" which was situated at 202a President Street, Doornfontein, Johannesburg. Marega then moved to Canada, arriving in Vancouver in October 1909, on their way to California. The North Shore Mountains reminded Bertha of her native Switzerland, which led to them settle in Vancouver. Charles Marega lived in Canada for the rest of his life. In 1936, Bertha died. He later became a sculpture teacher at the Vancouver School of Art (now Emily Carr Institute of Art and Design). He died in 1939 at the age of 67 after teaching a class at the Vancouver School of Art.

== Work ==
His works include:

- Owl (1905) on the Rand Investment Building in Pretoria, also known as Café Riche, Pretoria
- Façade of the Standard Bank Building in Johannesburg (1908)
- King Edward VII Memorial Fountain – now at the Vancouver Art Gallery.
- President Warren Harding Memorial in Stanley Park.
- The Stanley Park "promenade" (1925), a concrete pedestrian bridge extending from a city sidewalk between the Stanley Park Causeway and the seawall in Coal Harbour.
- Joe Fortes Memorial Fountain at English Bay.
- Michelangelo and DaVinci at Vancouver Art Gallery.
- Statues of George Vancouver and Sir Harry Burrard.
- Statues of lions at the Stanley Park entrance to the Lions Gate Bridge.
- A bust of Italian dictator Benito Mussolini, now at the Museum of Vancouver Collection.
- 14 statues for the British Columbia Parliament Buildings, Victoria, British Columbia.
- Nine stone sculpted Caryatids supporting the cornice line of the Beaux Arts style Sun Tower, 128 W. Pender St. in Vancouver, completed in 1912.
- The Seaforth Highlanders of Canada stag's head above the main doors of the Seaforth Armoury.

== Gallery ==
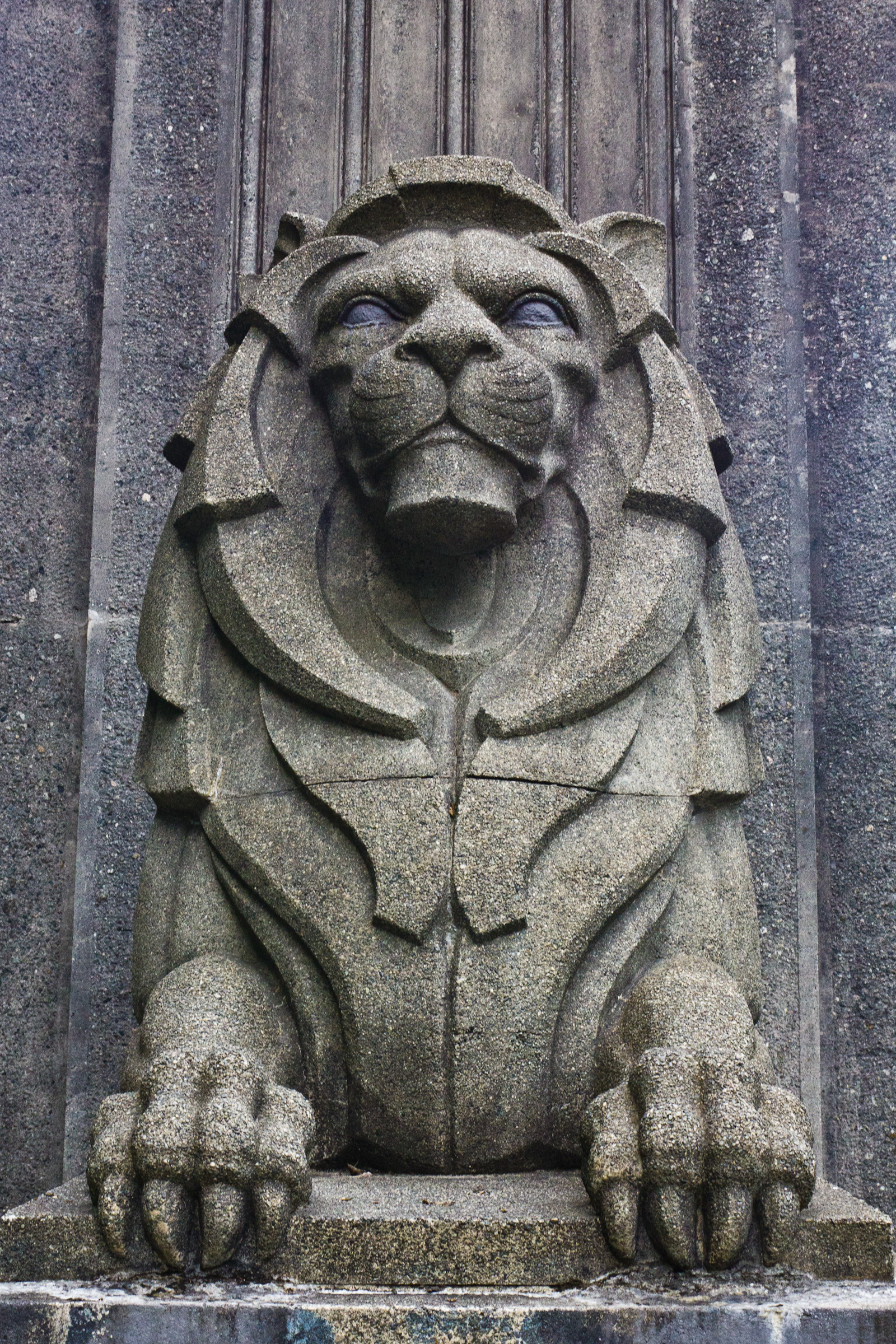
One of Marega's lions at the south end of the Lions Gate Bridge

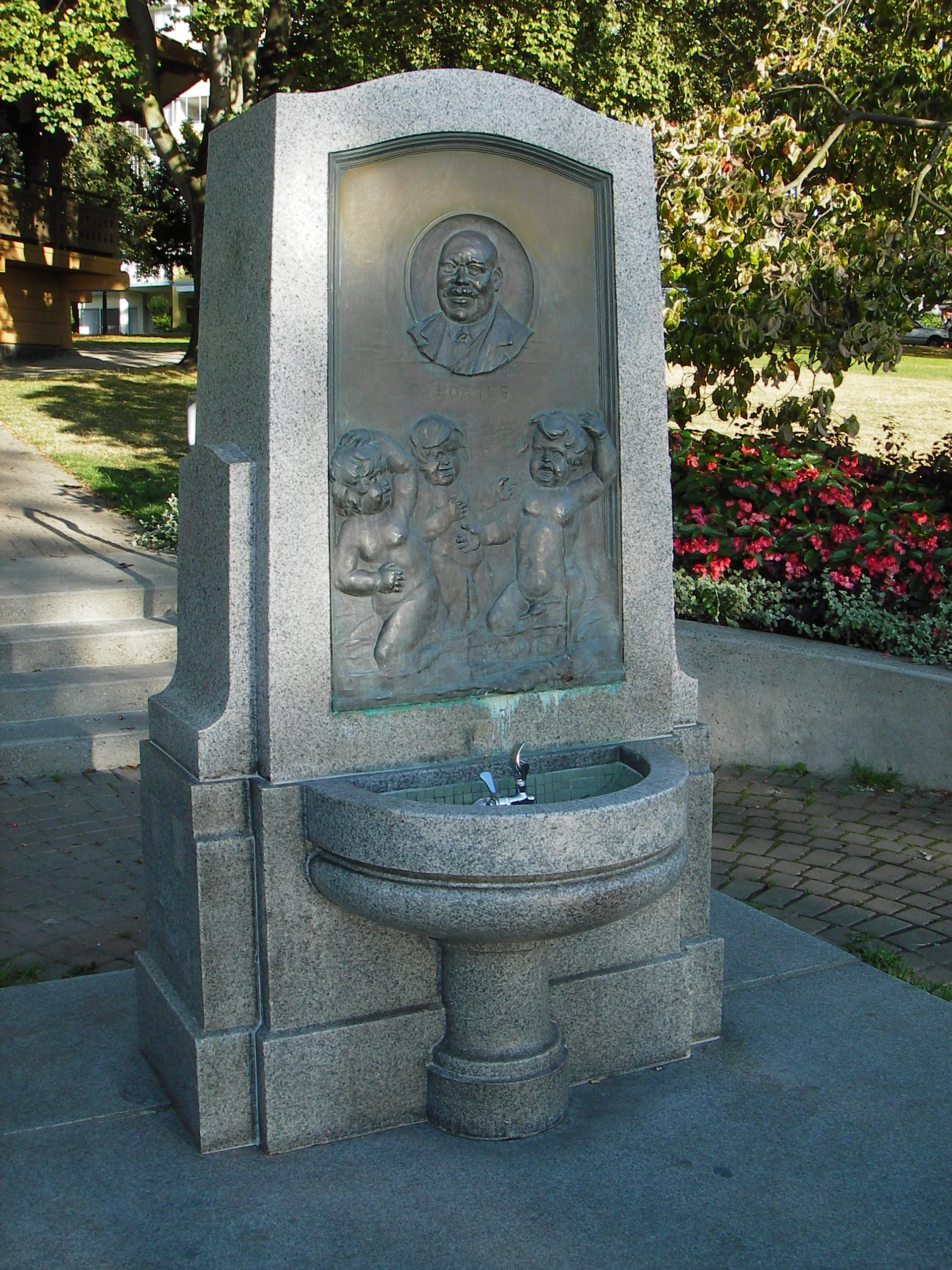
Joe Fortes Memorial Fountain

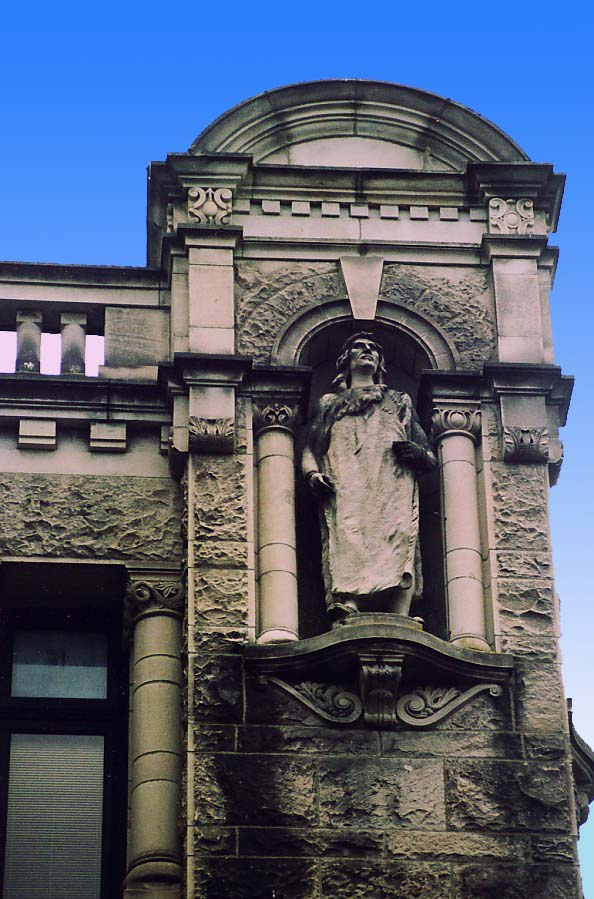
Chief Maquinna on the British Columbia Parliament Buildings
