= Constance Ward Harper =

Canadian author

Constance Ward Harper was a Canadian author, primarily of poetry, and the originator of the Flag Day concept.

== Biography ==
Constance was one of nine children to Benjamin Ednam Ward and Constance Marquerite Master. Benjamin immigrated to the United States between the 1840s and 1850s, while his wife was American-born. The couple's first two boys were named George Washington Ward, and Benjamin Franklin Ward.

In Hamilton, Harper raised $4,000 for war efforts.

Harper moved to Vancouver, where her husband managed the local branch of the Bank of Hamilton, "for some little time."

Ward published a poetry collection in 1916, known as Patriotic and other poems. It was "a prettily printed little booklet, bearing on its cover the Belgian flag." It included the poem "King Albert", about Albert I of Belgium. At least 800 copies were sold at 25 cents each, as Harper donated $200 to the Queen Elizabeth Fund for the Orphan Children on Belgium. A Vancouver Daily World critic suggested that Ward "must not confine her genius to war themes."

The Moon-Man and the Fairies (1930), a book of children's poetry, was released with illustrations by North Shore artist Grace Judge. The Vancouver Sun owners The Sun Publishing Co. Ltd. printed the title. A reviewer for The Province said parents "should not miss" the local title, deeming the poems "strikingly original." They continued that "there is no doubt that Mrs. Ward 'knows her children' to be enabled to write with such friendly intimacy of the things which little ones like to hear about. Animals, fairies and the wonders of the sea are all dealt with in the most interesting style, and the youngsters will get a great deal of fun out of its pages." In Canadian children's books, 1799-1939, Sheila Egoff dismissed the book as "the type of rhymed rubbish considered suitable for children at the time."

Harper appears on the Orangeville District Secondary School Wall of Honour, for "Entrepreneurial Spirit", specifically citing her Flag Day efforts.

== Bibliography ==
=== Poems ===
- "The Canadian Muse" (1914), critiquing Rudyard Kipling's interpretation of Canada, published in Hamilton Spectator, republished in Chicago Tribune
- "Vancouver" (1915), a tribute to Vancouver, British Columbia, published in Vancouver Daily World

=== Music ===
- "That home of loving dreams" (1939), words and music
- "That old-fashioned mother of mine" (1939), words and music
