= Robert James Cromie =

Robert James Cromie

Robert James Cromie (July 4, 1887 – May 11, 1936) was a Canadian newspaper publisher. He published the Vancouver Sun from 1917 until his death.

== Meeting with General J.W. Stewart; employment with Foley, Welch and Stewart ==
Cromie moved to Winnipeg as a teenager, where he worked as a junior office boy with the wholesale grocery firm Foley, Lock, and Larson and was associated with Winnipeg's Mariaggi hotel for approximately two years. During this period he put in 12 to 14 hours a day as waiter, captain of the bell boys and assistant bookkeeper and attending night school and the Y.M.C.A. It was as a bellhop at the Mariaggi Hotel that Cromie met General J.W. Stewart who hired him in 1906 to work at the Vancouver firm of Foley, Welch and Stewart, a large railway construction company.

The story of the meeting of Cromie and Stewart, during which Cromie impressed Stewart by "returning half" of a "sizeable tip", saying it was "too much" is an item of "Vancouver newspaper folklore". A version of the story appears in a profile titled "Cromie of the Sun", published in the Nov. 1, 1928 issue of Maclean's magazine, provided by an eastern businessman:

Receiving a quarter for delivering a glass of water to the man's hotel room, the teen-aged bellhop returned a dime and nickel in change. "Ten cents is enough for a glass of ice-water," he explained. As the businessman recounted to Maclean's a quarter-century later, "Well, say, no bellhop ever said that to anyone before or after in the history of the world. It nearly struck me dumb. I began to take an interest in the one and only bell-boy of his kind. 'What's your name, sonny,' I asked. 'Bobby Cromie,' he said. And that's the fellow who's publishing the Sun newspaper in your town."

On 6 Sept. 1911, Cromie married Bernadette Grace Mcfeely, the daughter of Mr. and Mrs. Edward J. McFeely, by the Rev. Father Welch at the Church of Our Lady of the Holy Rosary in Vancouver. At the time of his marriage, Cromie was the Vancouver purchasing agent for Foley, Welch & Stewart and was also serving as private secretary to Stewart.

Stewart and Cromie's names appear on the permit for the 1912 'Stewart and Cromie Warehouse', now the 'Percival Building', on Hamilton Street in Vancouver.

In 1917 Cromie was put in charge of the Vancouver Sun, a property of Foley, Welch and Stewart, and, by August, 1917, he had become the owner of the newspaper.

== Consolidation of the Vancouver Sun ==
As publisher of the Vancouver Sun, he absorbed the newspaper's two main competitors, The News-Advertiser and the Vancouver World, and built the Vancouver Sun into one of the city's two leading dailies. The consolidation of the Vancouver Sun with The News-Advertiser and the Vancouver World is described by Stephen Hume as follows:

"On 1 September [1917], with money borrowed from Clarence Brettun Blethen, publisher of the Seattle Daily Times, Cromie bought out the News-Advertiser, founded in 1886. He absorbed its circulation and quickly appropriated its history, claiming that the takeover made the Sun Vancouver's oldest newspaper. Dropping the evening edition, he began publishing in the morning. The paper's readership jumped from 10,000 to 17,000, and less than a year later, its Sunday edition was selling more than 25,000 copies.

On 11 March 1924, for $475,000, Cromie purchased the Vancouver Daily World from Charles Edwin Campbell, an entrepreneur who had owned it since 1921. Cromie later converted the World into the Vancouver Evening Sun, whose circulation reached 47,000 and topped 50,000 on Sundays in less than a decade. The almost fivefold increase in readership was a remarkable business turnaround, but it was not achieved without difficulty. When Cromie had trouble meeting a deadline to pay $135,000 he still owed Campbell, his creditor threatened to seize the Sun. According to newspaper historian Charles Tory Bruce, the irrepressible Cromie made "an emotional appeal" to Frederick Neal Southam, vice-president of Southam Limited [see William Southam] [see Southam Inc.], owner of The Province, Cromie's last major competitor in the Vancouver market. Southam was sufficiently impressed by the brash young publisher's enthusiasm to advance the funds. Bruce relates that The Province subsequently held third-mortgage bonds on the Sun for several years. Early in January 1926 Cromie dropped the morning edition completely."

D.A. McGregor described Cromie's acquisition and consolidation of the Sun as follows in 1946:

"On September 1, 1917, the Sun took over the News-Advertiser, paying J. S. H. Matson only $100,000 for it, it was said. At one stroke Mr. Cromie did two good pieces of business. He eliminated a rival, which, though not very aggressive at the time, might any day become an aggressive rival; and he added that rival's circulation to his own. The circulation of the News-Advertiser at the time was 8,000, that claimed by the Sun 10,000 (p 129)."

"In purchasing the World, Mr. Cromie apparently neglected to stipulate that Mr. Campbell should stay out of the Vancouver newspaper field. At any rate, Mr. Campbell did not stay out. On June 2, 1924, he started publication of the Evening Star, invading the very portion of the field on which Mr. Cromie was pinning his greatest hopes. The Evening Star was a six-day paper with a reduced news service, selling at 1 cent a copy on the street and at 30 cents a month delivered. The Star, its publisher announced, would cover the news of the world in condensed form. Its slogan would be: "If it will help make a greater Vancouver, the Star is for it (pp. 134-5)."

"In January, 1926, General Odlum and Mr. Cromie made a deal which stabilized the newspaper situation and had the effect of eliminating a lot of senseless and profitless competition. The Evening Star became the Morning Star, taking over the Morning Sun's circulation, while the Sun acquired the Star's evening circulation and withdrew from the morning field altogether. At the same time, the Sunday Sun, which was a relic of the Sunday morning edition of the old News-Advertiser, ceased publication as a Sunday newspaper, and became the Saturday edition of the Evening Sun (p. 136)."

== The Sun Under Cromie ==
The Sun under Cromie posed as the champion of British Columbia against what it called selfish eastern interests:

"Mr. Cromie knew nothing of the newspaper business when he took hold of the Sun, but he set himself to learn and he learned rapidly. He was a great reader and had an infinite curiosity. He liked to travel and talk to people and ask questions. He was fond of making experiments. He was never afraid of making mistakes or of getting his feet muddied. He was somewhat erratic at first, and had a procession of managing editors. But he learned something from each and at last knew what he could do and what he wanted to do. He upset the somewhat comfortable traditions that had developed in Vancouver newspaper circles. The Sun under F. C. Wade had been aggressive enough politically. Under Mr. Cromie it adopted aggressive news policies and sales policies as well. It put up a strong fight for circulation and advertising. It posed as the champion of British Columbia against what it called selfish eastern interests. It took up the fight for more equitable freight rates, for better rail connection with the Interior. Mr. Cromie had little interest in playing the game of party politics, but he had a deep and consistent interest in building up his newspaper, and no scruples about using politics and parties to do it."

The Vancouver Sun under Cromie's ownership was described by Stu Keate, publisher of the Vancouver Sun from 1964 until his retirement in 1978, as:

"..the working-man's paper – at once raucous, rambunctious and dedicated to the proposition that the simple business of a newspaper was to raise hell."

Robert Cromie and Alex Steffansson, Aklavik, Northwest Territories, June, 1934

In his 1961 book Vancouver: From Milltown to Metropolis Alan Morley observed, a propos of Cromie in his capacity as publisher of the Vancouver Sun:

"Eccentric, bold, ruthless, resourceful, he determined to identify the Sun with Vancouver and Vancouver with the Sun."

== Obituary Tributes ==
Mackenzie King, R. J. Cromie in parklands, Date: 1920s or 1930s Photographer / Studio: Dominion Photo Co., Courtesy of Vancouver Public Library's Special Collections Historical Photographs collection

Cromie died suddenly on May 11, 1936, in Oak Bay, British Columbia. In an obituary for Cromie published in the Winnipeg Evening Tribune on May 12, 1936, British Columbia Premier Duff Pattullo was quoted as saying that:

"British Columbia's loss also is great, for Mr. Cromie was an ardent advocate for greater Oriental trade, pointing out the vast potentialities in the Far East for products of this province."

The Hon. Ian Alistair Mackenzie, Minister of Defence, and member for the past 15 years of the British Columbia legislature and of the House of Commons for Vancouver ridings was quoted as saying: :"In my opinion, Robert Cromie did more for Vancouver and British Columbia in the last 20 years than any other single man. He had a vision of greatness for his home city and he worked tirelessly for its achievement."

Mayor Gerry McGeer of Vancouver, Liberal House Member for Vancouver-Burrard, said:

"In the untimely passing of Bob Cromie Vancouver has suffered a loss it can ill afford at this particular time. We, in Vancouver, have benefited greatly since the time "Bob" Cromie became one of the host of our citizens who love Vancouver almost more than life. Canadian journalism has lost a great leader. Vancouver has lost a great journalist and a great citizen. Vancouver mourns his passing in the knowledge that her problem of finding a man to take his place will not be an easy one to solve."

B.C. Nicholas, editor of the Victoria Times (now the Times Colonist), said:

"The Canadian publishing world has lost an outstanding figure and British Columbia an important factor in her progress in the death of Robert J. Cromie."

== Succession ==
Cromie's three sons, Donald, Samuel and Peter took over running the paper. In 1963 Donald Cameron Cromie sold the Sun to FP Publications.
