= McLagan =

McLagan is a surname. Notable people with the surname include:

- Angus McLagan (1891–1956), New Zealand politician
- Ian McLagan (1945–2014), English musician
- Cole McLagan (born 1996), American soccer player
- Jennifer McLagan, Canadian chef and food writer
- John McLagan (1838–1901), Canadian newspaper publisher
- Kim McLagan (1948–2006), English model
- Peter McLagan (1823–1900), British politician
- Sara Anne McLagan (c. 1856–1924), Canadian newspaper publisher

== See also ==
- Maclagan (disambiguation)
