= McLogan =

McLogan is a surname. Notable people with the surname include:

- Edwin C. McLogan (1889–1949), American politician
- Paddy McLogan (1899–1964), Irish republican and politician

== See also ==
- McLagan
