= Maclagan =

Maclagan or MacLagan may refer to:

== People ==
- Andrew Douglas Maclagan FRSE (1812–1900), Scottish physician
- Bill Maclagan (1858–1926), Scotland and British Lions rugby union captain
- Christian Maclagan (1811–1901), Scottish antiquarian and early archaeologist
- Daniel MacLagan (1904-1991), zoologist and entomologist
- David Maclagan (1785–1865), Scottish doctor
- Diane Maclagan (born 1974), mathematician
- Edward Douglas MacLagan (1864–1952), British administrator in India
- Sir Eric Maclagan (1879–1951), British museum director
- Gilchrist Maclagan (1879–1915), British rower, gold medallist in the 1908 Olympics
- James MacLagan (1728–1805), collector of Scottish Gaelic poetry and song
- Malcolm Maclagan (1907–1997), engineer and cricketer
- Michael Maclagan (1914–2003), historian, antiquary and herald at Oxford
- Miles Maclagan (born 1974), tennis coach
- Myrtle Maclagan (1911–1993), English cricketer
- Robert Maclagan (1820–1894), British Army officer
- Thomas John MacLagan (1838–1903), Scottish pharmacologist
- William Maclagan (1826–1910), Archbishop of York
- Ewen Sinclair-MacLagan (1868–1948), British Army officer

== Places ==
- Maclagan, Queensland, a town in the Toowoomba Region, Australia
  - North Maclagan, Queensland, a locality in the Toowoomba Region, Australia
- Pechey-Maclagan Road, road in Queensland

== See also ==
- McLagan (disambiguation)
