= World Building =

World Building can refer to:

- New York World Building, the tallest building in New York City from 1890 to 1894
- Sun Tower, Vancouver, British Columbia, Canada, known as the World Building until 1924
- Worldbuilding, the process of constructing an imaginary world or milieu
