= Madderty =

Village in Scotland

Coordinates: 56°22′N 3°42′W

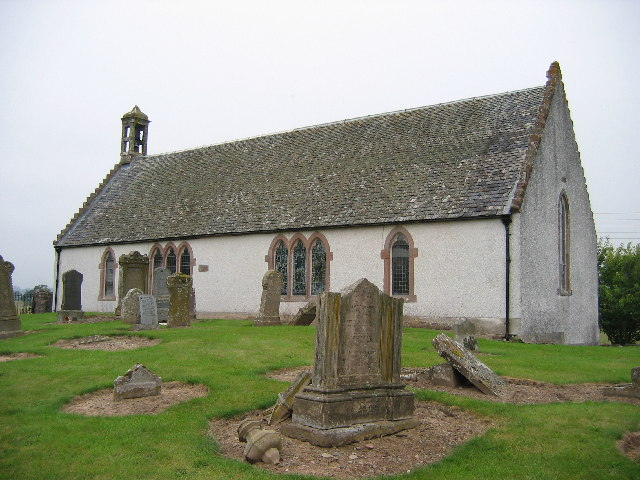
The parish church in Madderty was built in 1689 and remodeled in 1867

Madderty is a village in Strathearn, Perth and Kinross. It lies on the former railway line connecting Perth and Crieff. The Gask Ridge and its Roman road lie to the south and the remains of Inchaffray Abbey to the north.

Madderty is mentioned in a charter of about 1200, at which time there was a church dedicated to Saint Ethernan in the village.

The prominent agricultural zoologist Dr Daniel MacLagan FRSE (1904–1991) was born on Williamstone Farm here and later ran the farm.
