= Sara Anne McLagan =

Irish-born Canadian newspaper editor and clubwoman

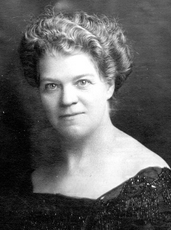
- Sara Anne McLagan, from a 1924 newspaper obituary
- Born: Sara Anne Maclure; 1 April 1855 near Belfast, County Tyrone
- Died: 20 May 1924 (aged 69); Vancouver
- Occupation(s): Newspaper editor, clubwoman
- Spouse: John McLagan (m. 1884; died 1901)
- Children: 5

Sara Anne McLagan (1 April 1855 – 20 March 1924), born Sara Anne Maclure, was an Irish-born Canadian newspaper editor and clubwoman, co-founder and publisher of the Vancouver Daily World. She is often described as "the first female publisher of a daily newspaper in Canada" or "the first Canadian female newspaper editor."

== Early life ==
Sara Anne Maclure was born near Belfast, County Tyrone, the daughter of daughter of John Cunningham Maclure and Martha McIntyre Maclure. Her father moved to New Westminster in 1858, as a surveyor with the Royal Engineers. The following year, she emigrated to Canada with her mother and baby sister, to join him.

Maclure's father taught her telegraphy. At the age of 12, when a major forest fire threatened their home in Matsqui (now part of Abbotsford), Sara tapped a message through to New Westminster to call for help. At 15 she was employed at the New Westminster telegraph station.

=== Telegraphy and journalism ===
McLagan worked at the Western Union Telegraph Company in Matsqui and in Victoria, as an operator, tester, dispatcher, and office manager, until she married in 1884. In 1888 she was a co-founder (with her husband) of the Vancouver Daily World newspaper. After her husband's death in 1901, she continued as president and editor of the paper, the largest Canadian daily published west of Winnipeg, with her brother Frederick S. Maclure. She is often described as "the first female publisher of a daily newspaper in Canada." During her tenure, the newspaper added a woman's page. She sold the paper to a group of businessmen in 1905.

McLagan was an early member of the Canadian Women's Press Club, and of the British Columbia Institute of Journalists.

=== Clubwork ===
McLagan was a founder of the Local Council of Women of Vancouver, and president of the organization from 1898 to 1900. She was a provincial leader of the National Council of Women of Canada from 1903 to 1907, advocating for women's suffrage in Canada and improved career opportunities for women. She helped found a Vancouver chapter of the Victorian Order of Nurses, presiding over the chapter from 1902 to 1906, and helped establish a nurses' training home in the city. In 1903 she served as president of the Art, Historical and Scientific Association of Vancouver. She was also involved in the city's YWCA and YMCA, and active in the Georgian Club and the Imperial Order Daughters of the Empire (IODE).

=== World War I ===
McLagan's only son, Patrick Douglas Maclure McLagan, died at Ypres in 1917, in World War I. In 1920 she was presented with the "Cross of Sacrifice" for her postwar relief work with the Red Cross at Vitry-en-Artois, France, sponsored by the IODE. She and her daughter were the only British Columbians at the unveiling of the Cenotaph to the Unknown Warrior in Whitehall in 1921. Later that year, she chose St. Andrew's Presbyterian Church in Vancouver to house a bronze memorial tablet to her son's memory.

== Personal life ==
Sara Anne Maclure married widowed printer John McLagan in 1884. He had a grown son, and they had more children together, including four daughters Geraldine (who died in 1891), Hazel, Marguerite, and Doris, and a son, Patrick Douglas (who died in 1917). She died in 1924, aged 68 years, in Vancouver. As of 2012, her grave was unmarked.

In 2018, the Vancouver City Council named a public space at the corner of West Pender Street and Beatty Street as "Sara Anne McLagan Plaza".
