= William Tuff Whiteway =

Canadian architect (1856–1940)

- Born: April 30, 1856; Musgrave Harbour, Newfoundland Colony
- Died: October 9, 1940 (aged 84); Vancouver, British Columbia, Canada
- Occupation: Architect
- Notable work: World Building (now Sun Tower), Vancouver; St. Regis Hotel, Vancouver
- Spouse(s): Elizabeth Sketchley (m. 1884) Ada Croft (m. 1900)
- Children: 5
- Relatives: Jesse Whiteway (brother); William C. Winsor (nephew)

William Tuff Whiteway (April 30, 1856 – October 9, 1940) was a Canadian architect originally from Newfoundland. He is best known for his work in the architecture of early 20th-century Vancouver, although he received commissions in various parts of the Canada and the United States during his peripatetic career.

== Biography ==
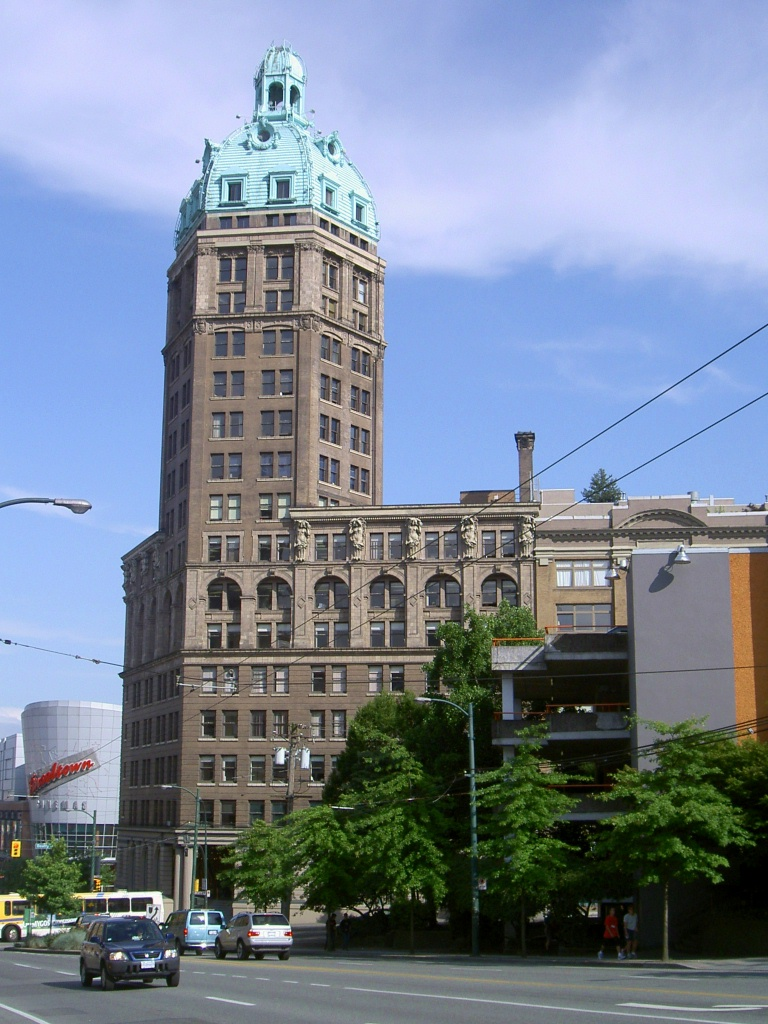
World Building (1912) Now Sun Tower

Whiteway was born in Musgrave Harbour, Newfoundland Colony in 1856. He moved to Victoria, British Columbia in approximately 1882, to Vancouver in 1886, and to San Diego in 1887. In 1888, he moved to Port Townsend, Washington, where he practiced architecture with his partner Julius C. Schroeder. In 1892, he left Port Townsend for St. John's, Newfoundland and Labrador, and then moved to Halifax where he partnered with William T. Horton. In 1900, Whiteway returned to Vancouver, where he remained until his death in 1940.

During his career he was repeatedly in conflict with the Architectural Institute of British Columbia for nonpayment of membership fees, and for undercutting the minimum fees that the Institute imposed on transactions with clients. He was also criticized by the Institute for working with an unlicensed architect, W.H. Chow, who was barred from licensing because of his race.

Another element of controversy surrounds whether he truly designed the most famous work attributed to him, the World Building (now Sun Tower) of Vancouver. Another highly successful Vancouver architect of the era, George L.T. Sharp (1880–1974), has claimed the initial sketch was his, not Whiteway's.

== Notable Commissions ==
All are in Vancouver unless otherwise specified; all are extant unless otherwise specified.

In chronological order:

- Second Ferguson Block (1887), 6 Powell Street at Carrall Street. Designated as a heritage building by the City of Vancouver.
- Miller and Burkett Building (1889), 237 Taylor Street, Port Townsend, Washington. Later known as the Elks Building, now Silverwater Restaurant. Designed by the firm of Whiteway and Schroeder.
- Sterming Block (1889), 921-925 Water Street, Port Townsend, Washington. Designed by the firm of Whiteway and Schroeder. Now The Belmont.
- Captain Tibbal's Building (1889), 1004 Water Street, Port Townsend, Washington. Designed by the firm of Whiteway and Schroeder. Also known as the Palace Hotel, the building operated as a brothel for many years. Following renovation, it now operates as a legitimate hotel.
- Mount Baker Block (1890), 910-914 Water Street, Port Townsend, Washington. Designed by the firm of Whiteway and Schroeder.
- Duck Block (1892), 1314-1322 Broad Street, Victoria.
- Keith Building (1896), 1581-89 Barrington Street, Halifax, Nova Scotia. Designated as a heritage building by the City of Halifax 1981.
- St. John's Courthouse (1904), Water Street at Duckworth Street, St. John's, Newfoundland. It is listed on the Canadian Register of Historic Places. Some sources attribute this to Whiteway, while at least one other source attributes it to architect William H. Greene.
- Chinese Times Building (1902), 1 East Pender Street at Carrall Street. Designated as a heritage building by the City of Vancouver.
- Kelly Douglas Warehouse (1905), 316 Water Street, now The Landing, an office and retail complex.
- Wood's Hotel (1906), 412 Carrall Street at East Hastings Street. Variously known as the Roger Hotel, Rainbow Hotel, and Portland Hotel; now Pennsylvania Hotel. This five-story hotel was notable because both street facades consist entirely of bay windows, with a circular turret at the corner. Designated as a heritage building by the City of Vancouver, it was renovated in 2008-2009 for use as social housing.
- Hotel Winters (1906), 203 Abbott Street at Water Street, commissioned by William Frederick Winters. It was destroyed by fire in 2022.
- MacDonald School (1906), 1955 East Pender Street at Victoria Drive.
- Orange Hall (1907), 341 Gore Avenue at East Hastings Street. This was originally a meeting place for the Orange Order, a militant Protestant organization, although the building once housed a synagogue while owned by the Orange Order. In the mid-1940s, it was sold and renovated by architect William Frank Gardiner under the National Housing Administration. Designated as a heritage building by the City of Vancouver.
- Fire Hall No. 1 (1907), 270-280 East Cordova Street, now Fire Hall Arts Centre. Designated as a heritage building by the City of Vancouver.
- Kamloops Public School (1907), 245 St. Paul Street, Kamloops, British Columbia, now Stuart Wood School.
- Admiral Seymour School (1907), 1130 Keefer Street.
- Lord Roberts School (1908), 1100 Bidwell Street. Designated as a heritage building by the City of Vancouver.
- Woodward's Department Store (1908), 101 West Hastings Street at Abbott Street, now integrated into a new mixed-use structure. Designated as a heritage building by the City of Vancouver.
- Manitoba Hotel (1909), 50 West Cordova Street, now Hildon Hotel. Designated as a heritage building by the City of Vancouver.
- Hotel Metropole (1910), 320 Abbott Street, also known as Travellers Hotel. Designated as a heritage building by the City of Vancouver.
- Holden Building (1911), 10-16 East Hastings Street, now Tellier Tower. Designated as a heritage building by the City of Vancouver.
- World Building (1912), 100 West Pender Street, now Sun Tower. Designated as a heritage building by the City of Vancouver. Its attribution to Whiteway is disputed; see above.
- St. Regis Hotel (1912), 602 Dunsmuir Street at Seymour Street.
- Pender Hotel (1913), 31 West Pender Street. Originally Palmer Rooms, also known as Wingate Hotel. Designated as a heritage building by the City of Vancouver.
- Duncan Elementary School (1913), 1035 Nagle Street, Duncan, British Columbia.
- 6120 McDonald Street (1921), house built for G.L. Smellie in the Georgian Revival style. Designated as a heritage building by the City of Vancouver.
- Normandie Apartments (1927), 1425 Haro Street.

== Gallery ==
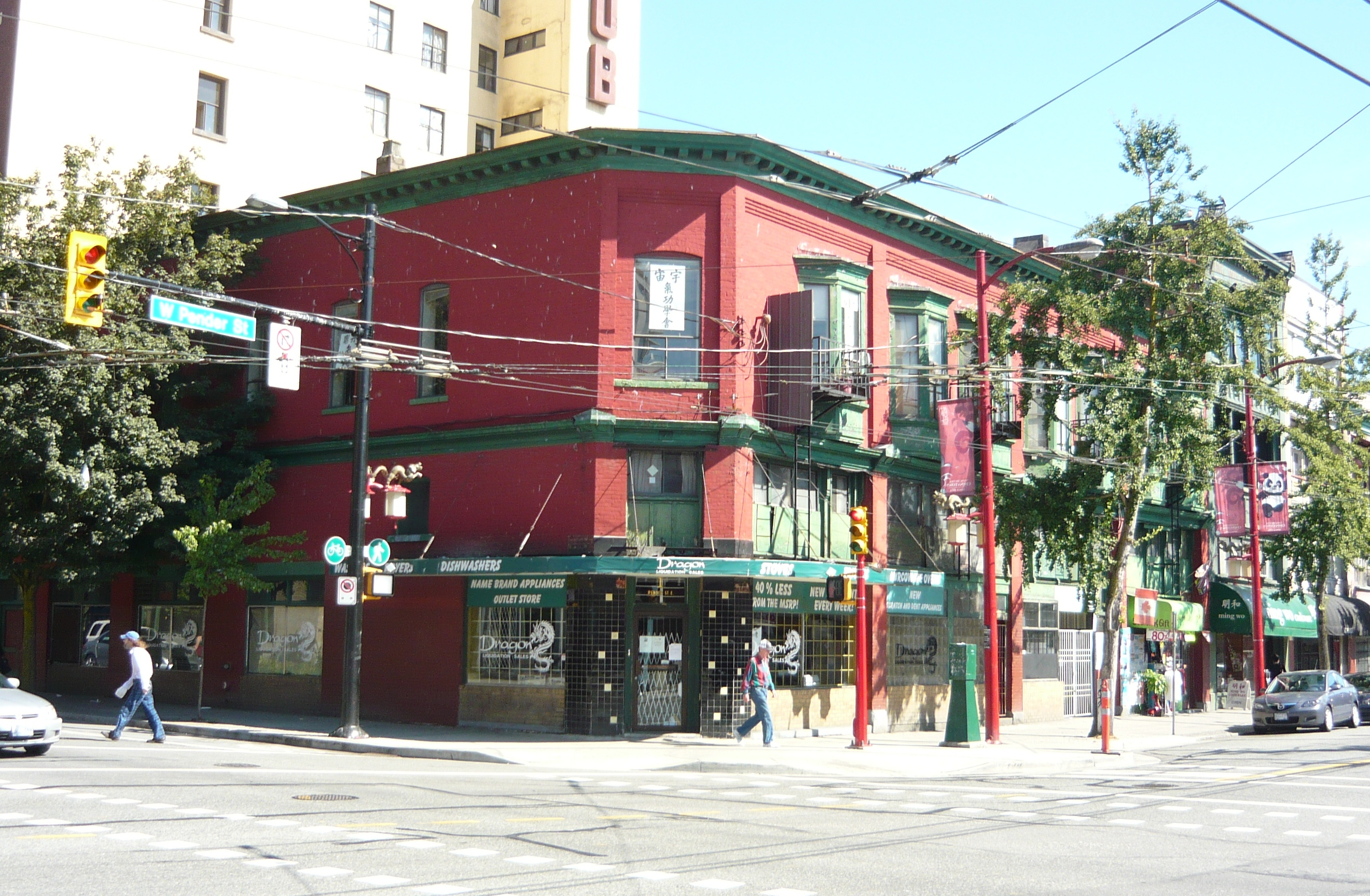
Chinese Times Building (1902)

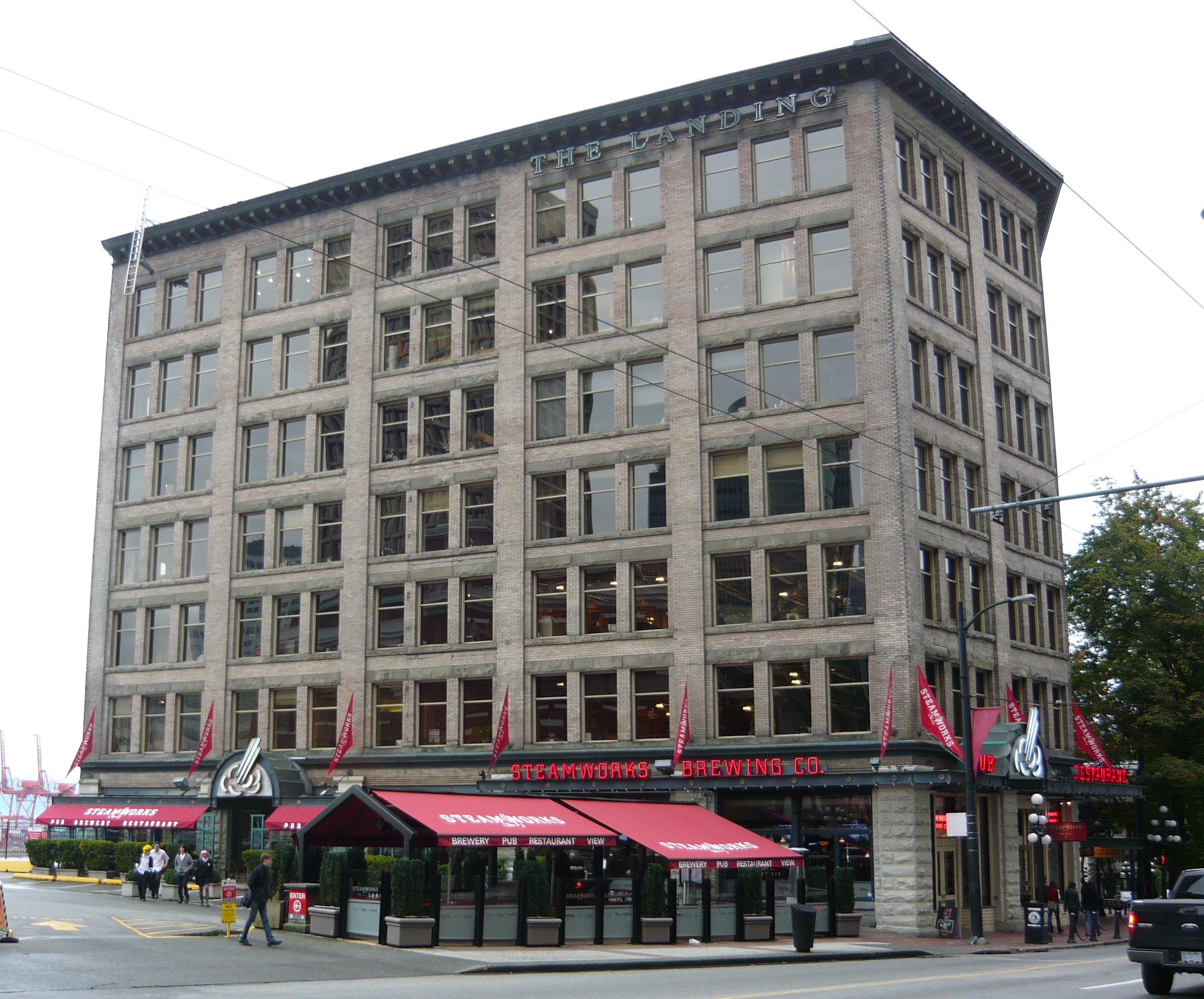
Kelly Douglas Warehouse (1905)
Now The Landing

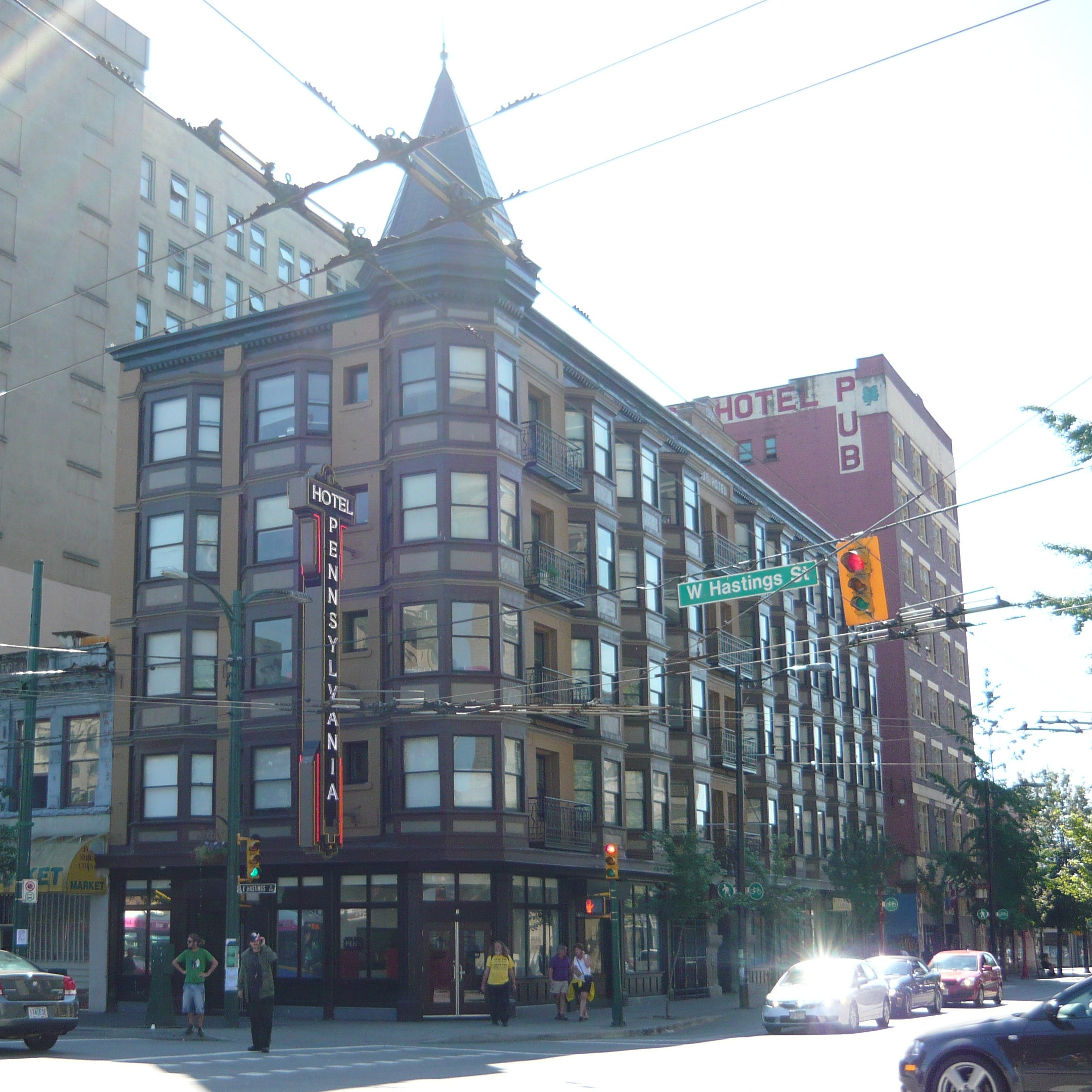
Wood's Hotel (1906)
Now Pennsylvania Hotel

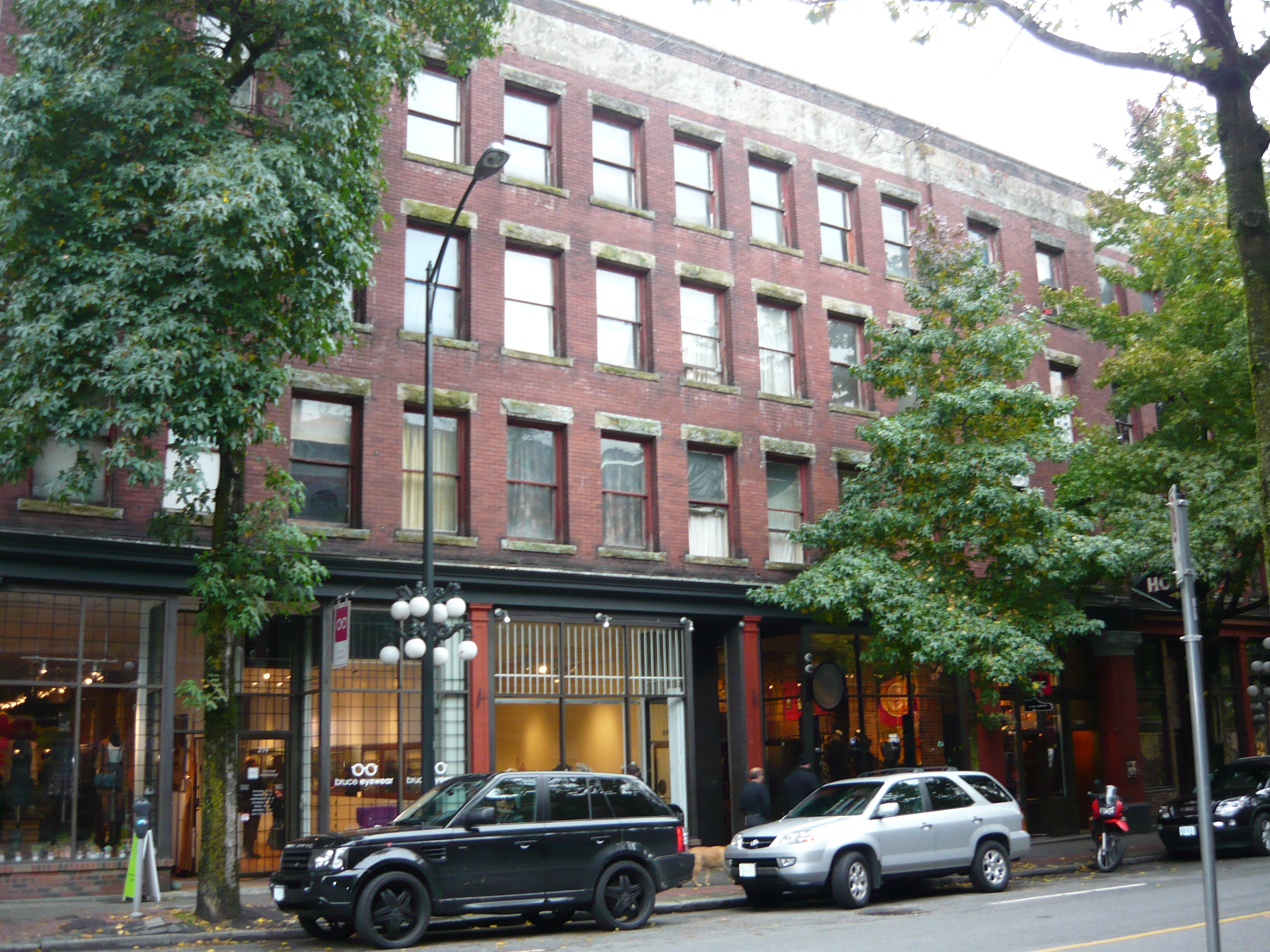
Winters Hotel (1906)

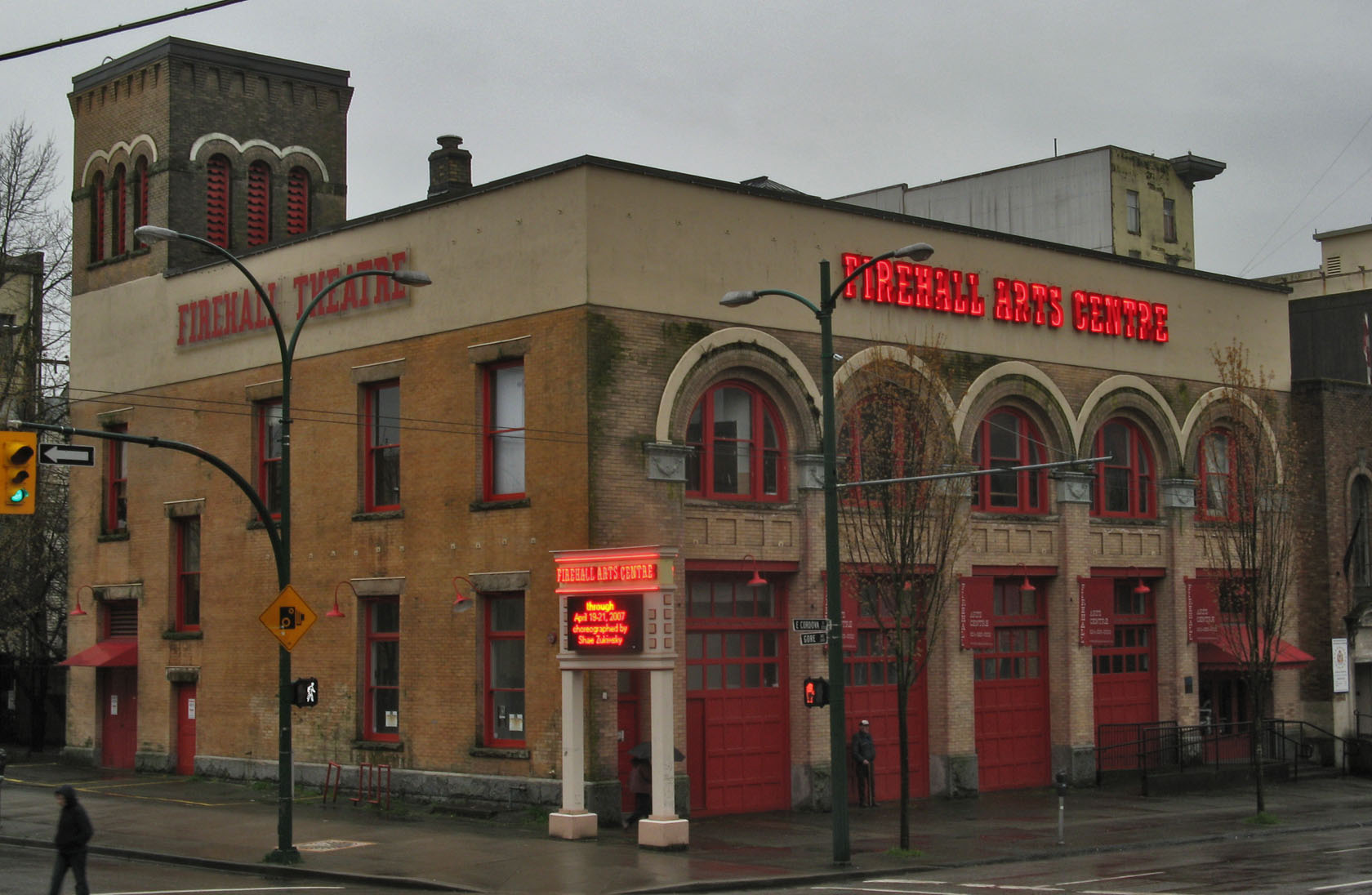
Fire Hall No. 1 (1907)
Now Fire Hall Arts Centre

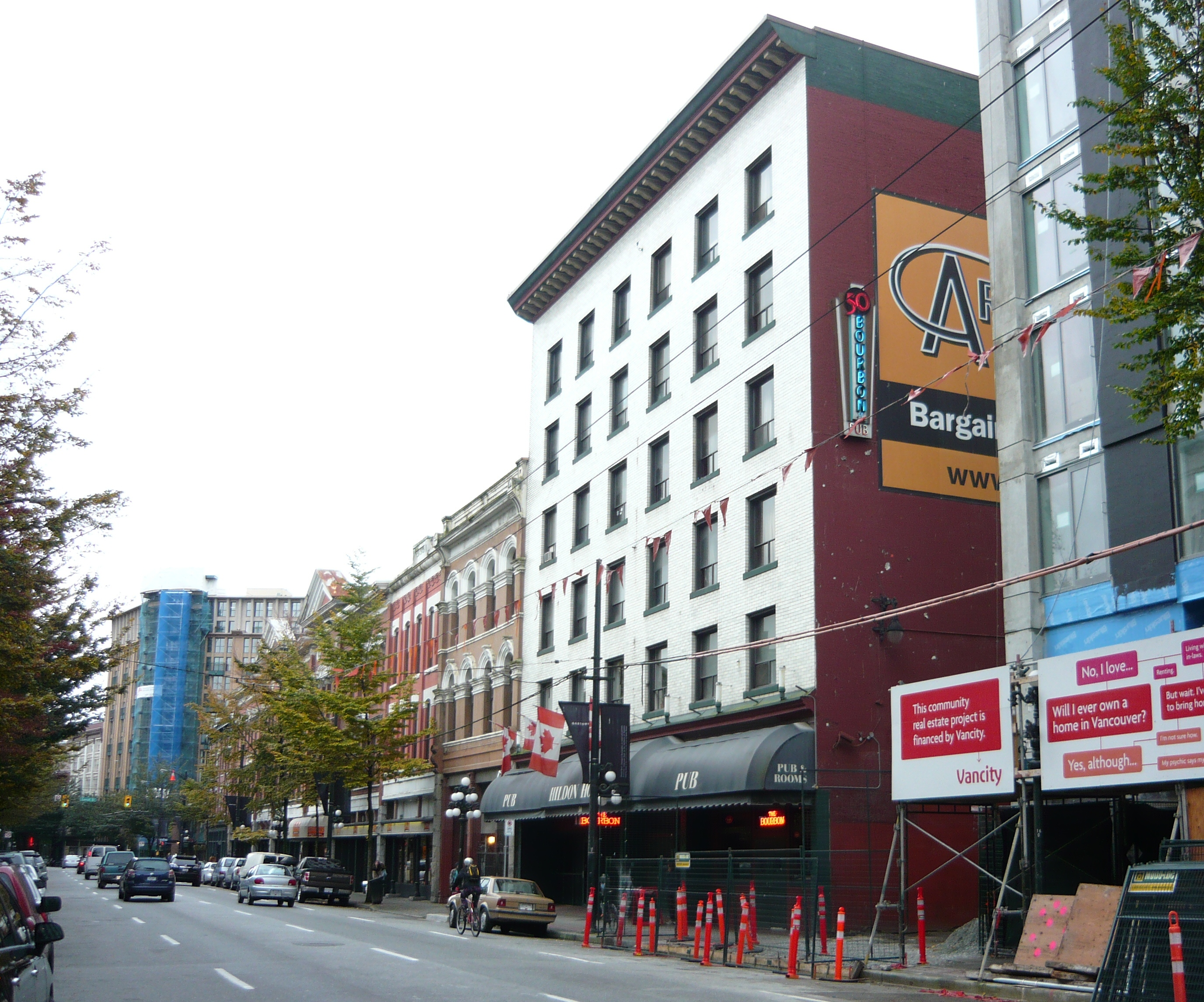
Manitoba Hotel (1909)
Now Hildon Hotel

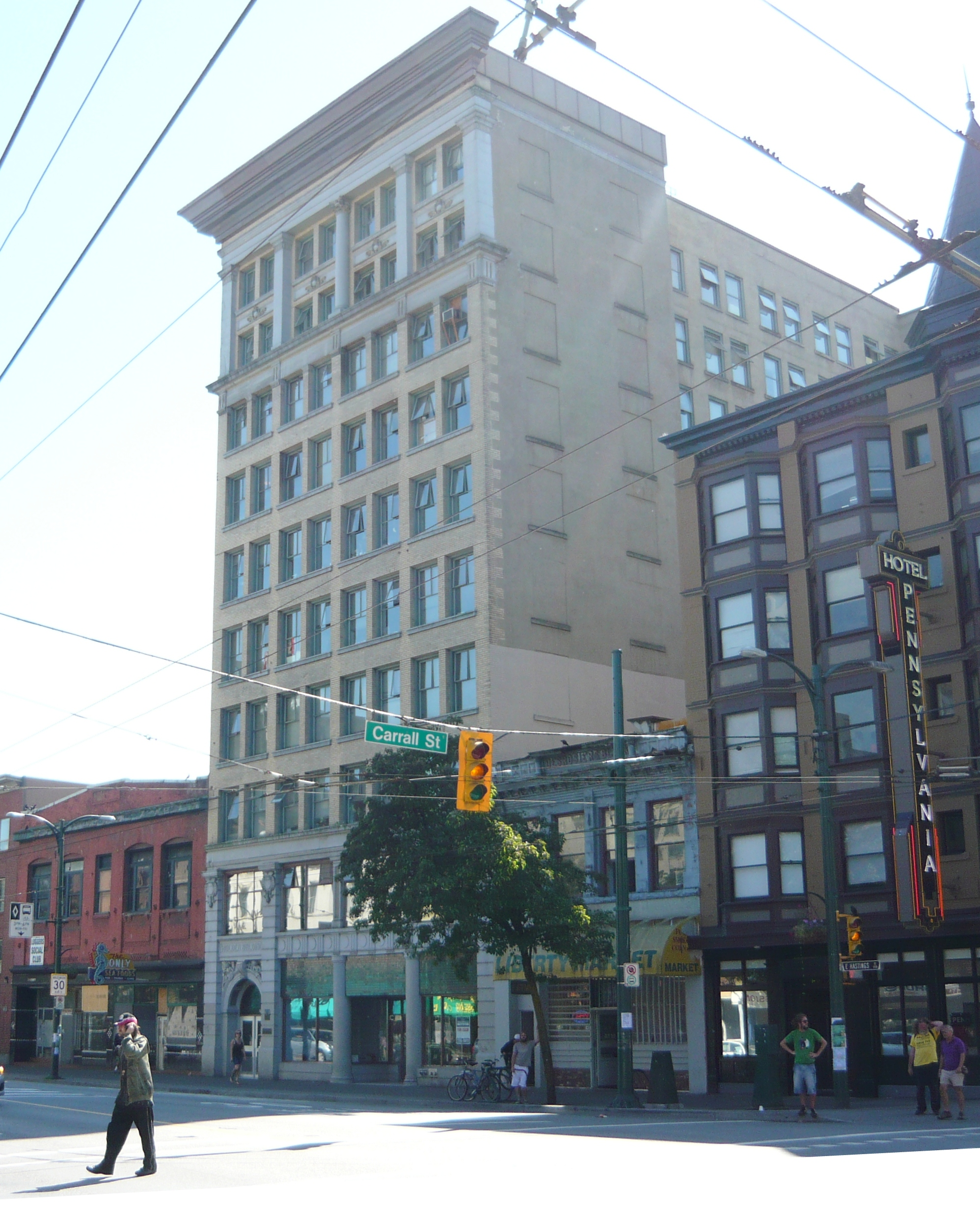
Holden Building (1911)
Now Tellier Tower

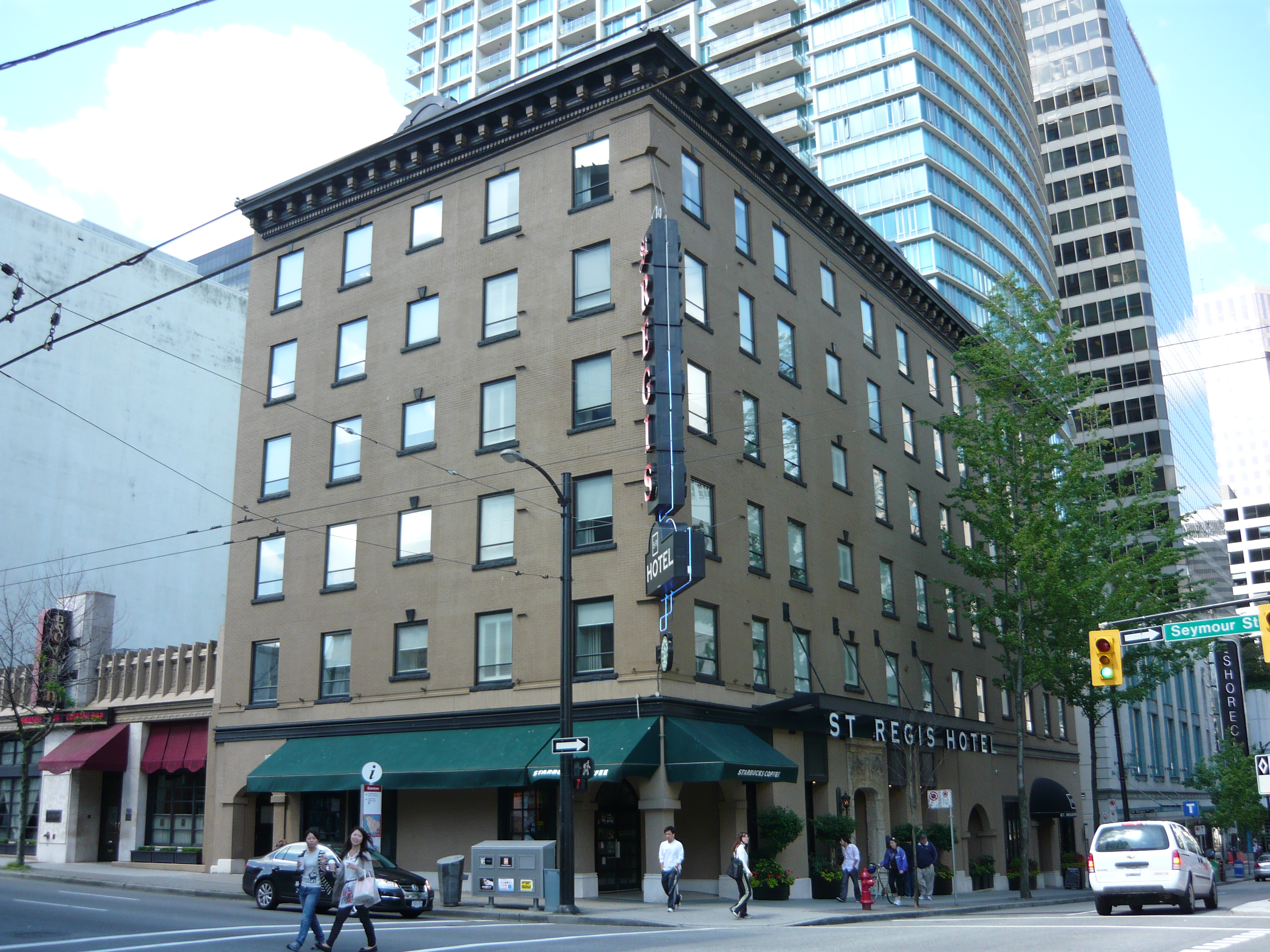
St. Regis Hotel (1913)

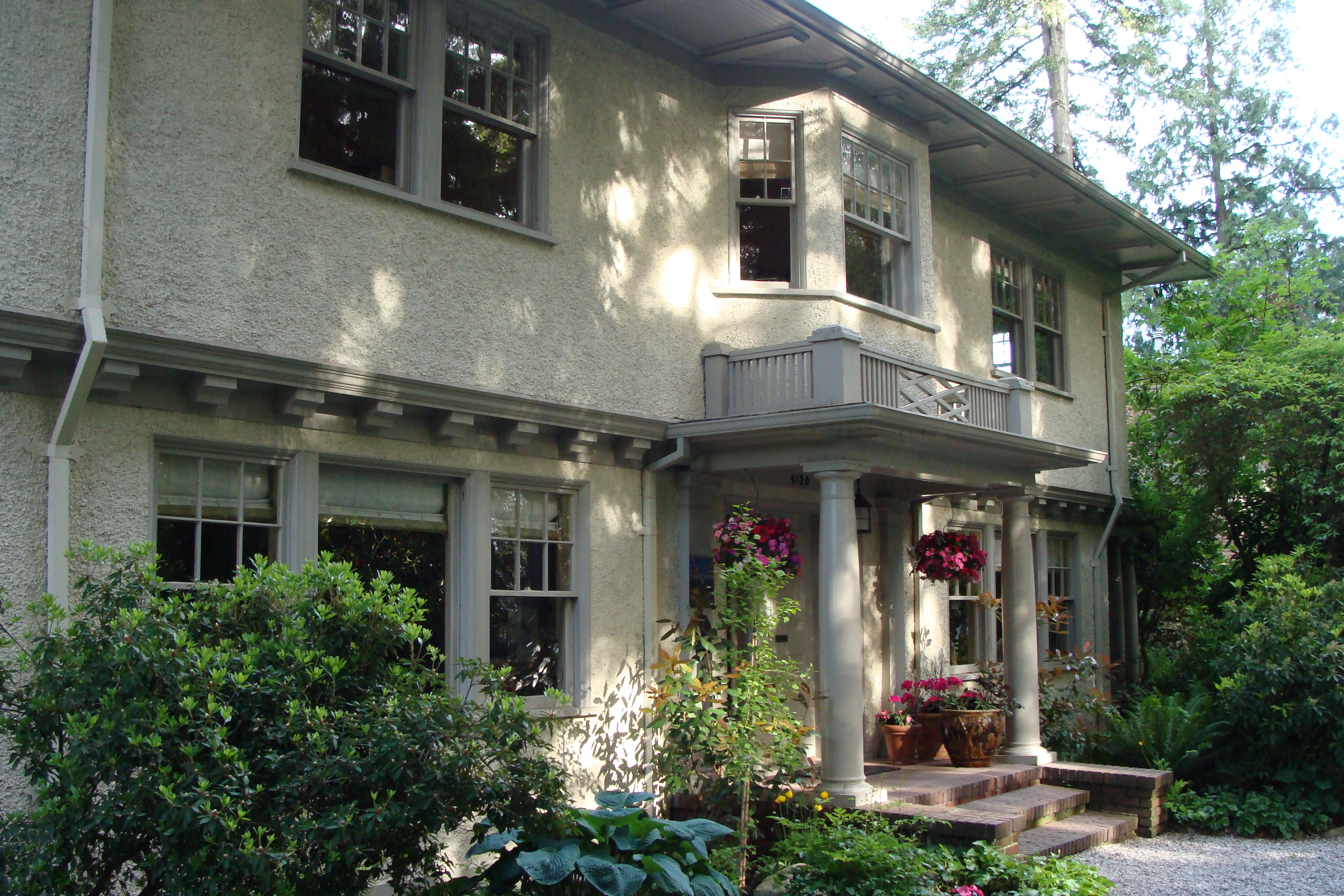
6120 McDonald Street (1921)

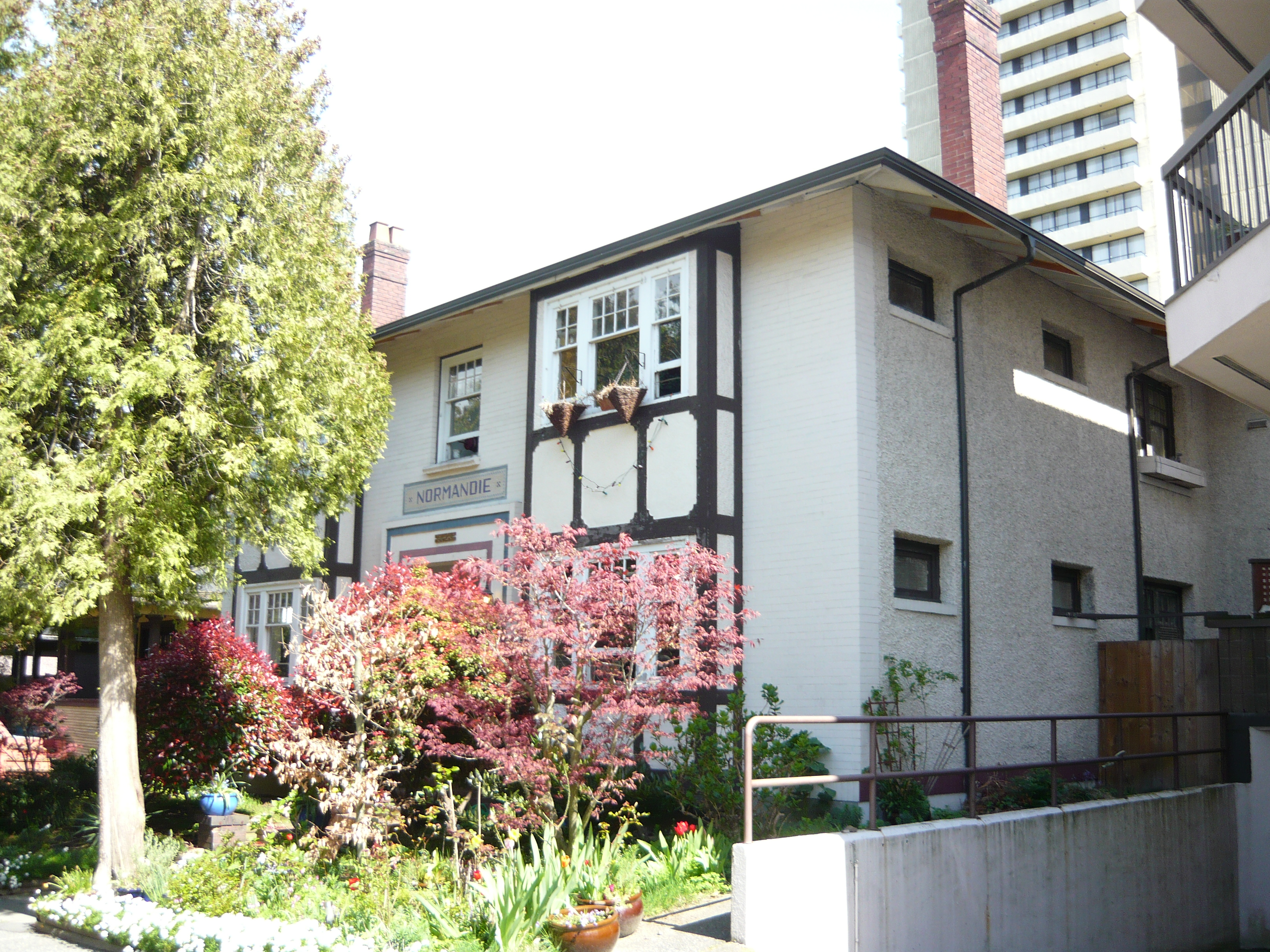
Normandie Apartments (1927)
