= St. John's Court House =

Courthouse in Newfoundland and Labrador, Canada

Coordinates: 47.5646°N 52.7072°W

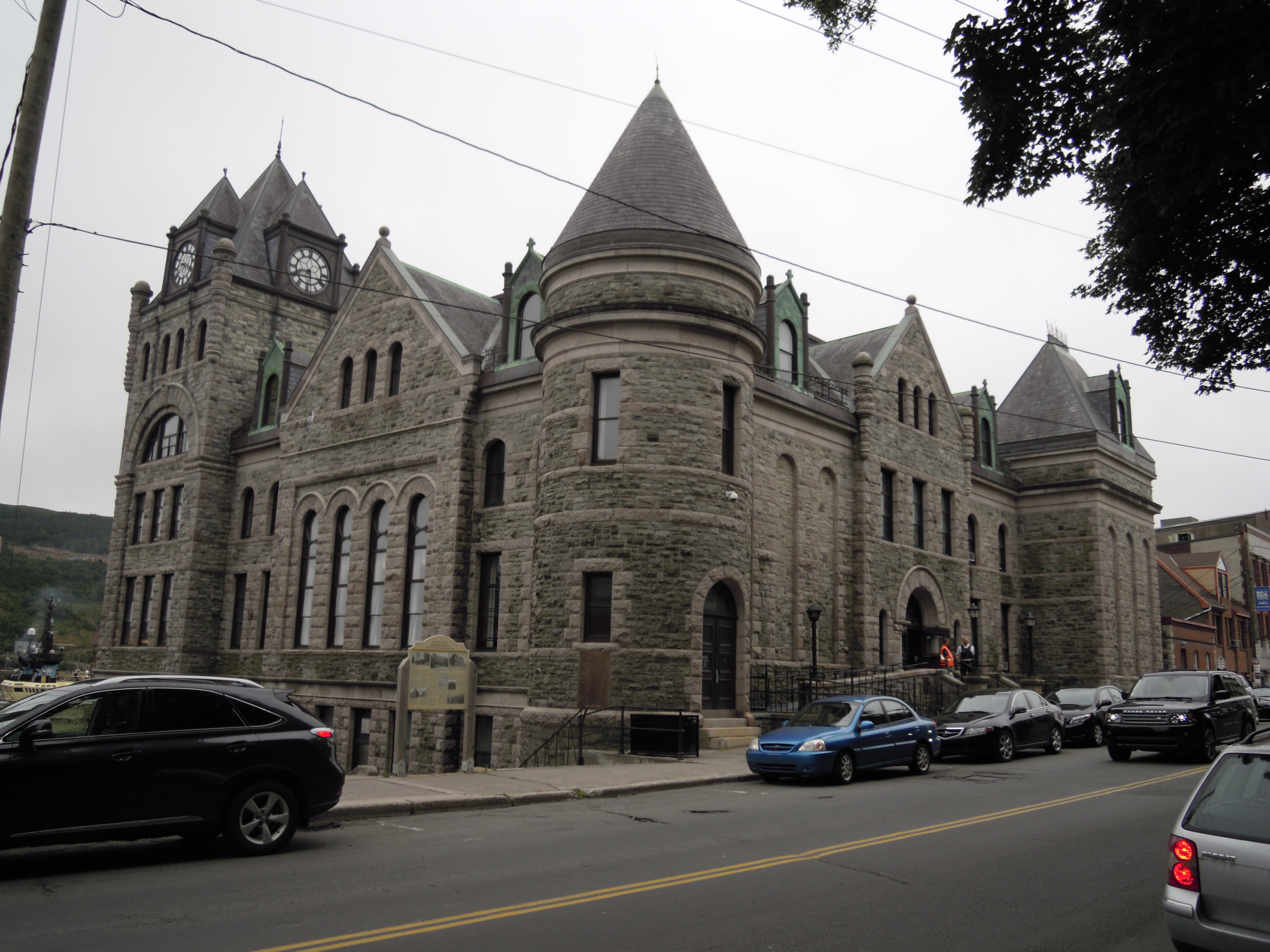
St. John's Court House in 2012

The St. John’s Court House is located on Water Street and Duckworth Street in St. John’s, Newfoundland and Labrador, Canada. Constructed in 1901–04, the building is a National Historic Site of Canada. Sources differ with regard to its architect; it was designed either by William Tuff Whiteway or by William H. Greene.

== History ==
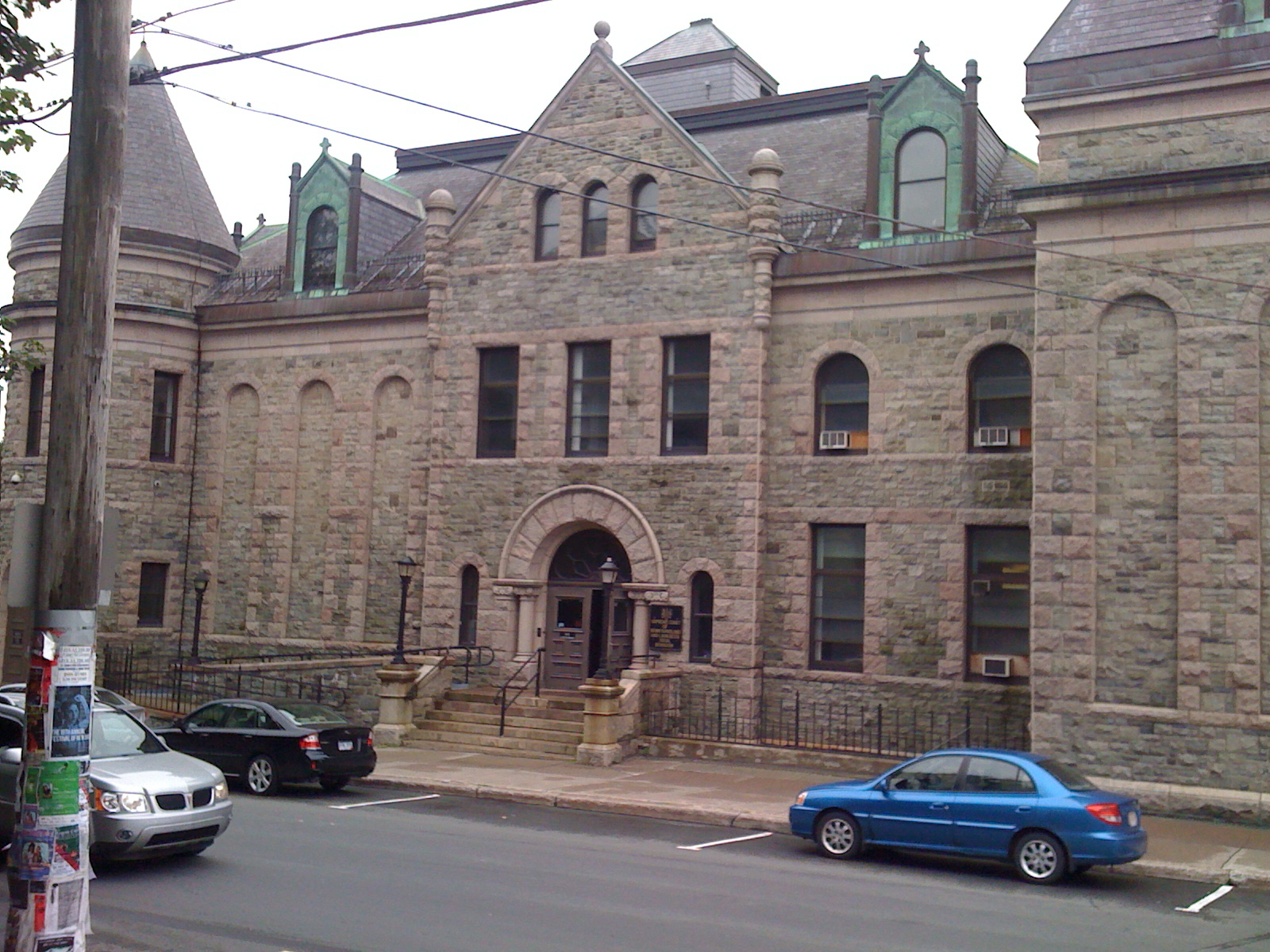
Duckworth street facade of the Supreme Court of Newfoundland and Labrador, entrance to the Trial Division

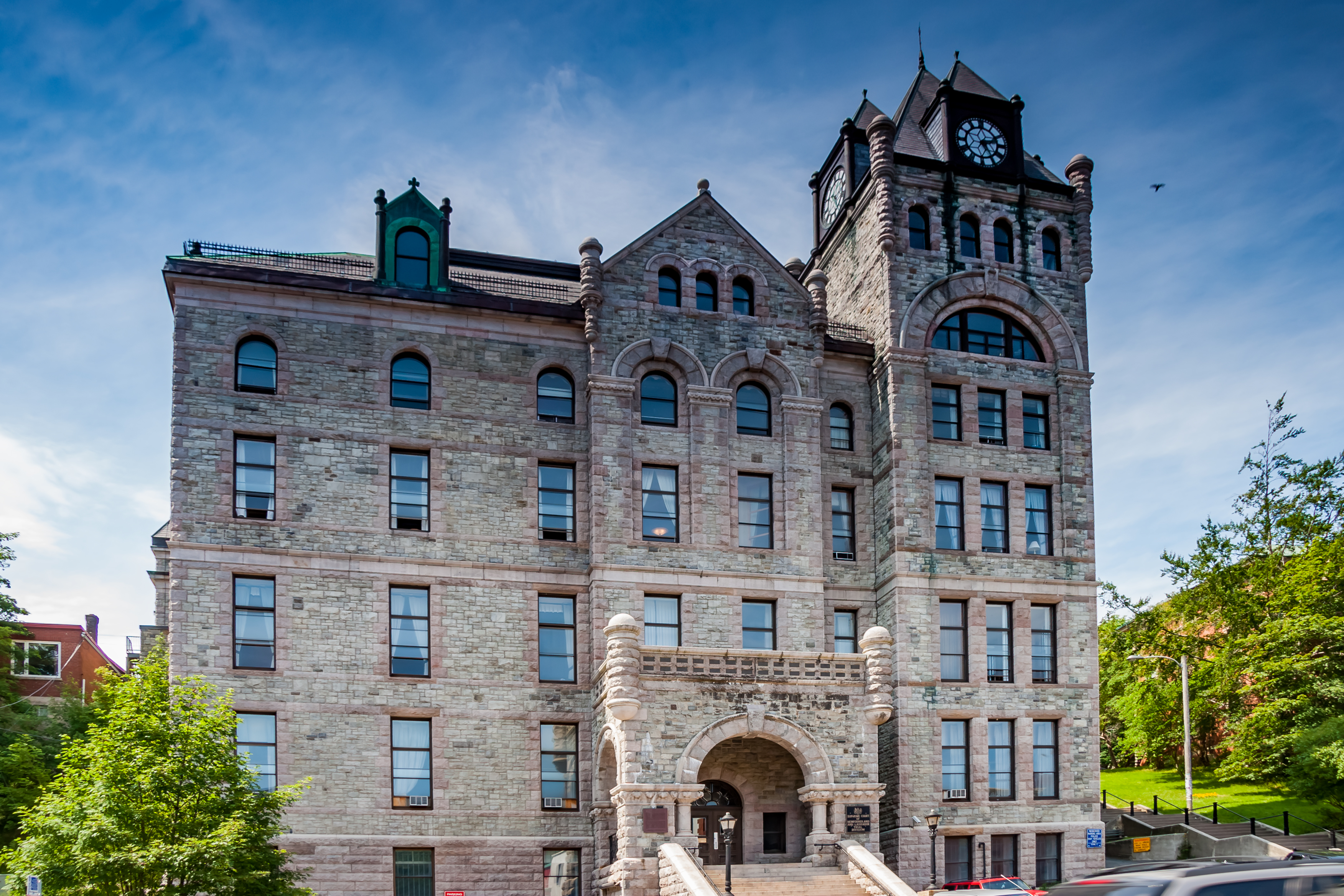
Supreme Court of Newfoundland and Labrador, south facade

The first building on the site opened in September 1730 as a combined courthouse and jail. A larger facility that was constructed in 1831 burned down in the 1840s. A third courthouse was constructed starting in 1847, but it was destroyed by the Great Fire of 1892.

Temporary courthouses included the Colonial Building from 1892 to 1894 and a wooden purpose-built courthouse (later the Star of the Sea Hall, which was eventually demolished and replaced by the Star of the Sea apartment building) from 1894 until the current building was ready in 1904. The cornerstone was laid on October 24, 1901 by the Duke of York, who later reigned as King George V.

Prior to completion of the Confederation Building in 1960, the Courthouse was also occupied by various offices of the provincial government, including the Prime Minister/Premier, the Colonial Secretary, and Cabinet. The Courthouse formerly housed the Registry of Deeds, Companies and Securities, but was also relocated to the Confederation Building in 1960. The Courthouse formerly housed the St. John’s Department of Public Works.

The building was designated a National Historic Site on January 15, 1981, and is recognized by the Historic Sites and Monuments Board of Canada. The Courthouse has undergone various projects to maintain its historic and architectural significance, including in 1989.

== See also ==
- Architecture of St. John's
- Supreme Court of Newfoundland and Labrador
