= Daniel MacLagan =

Scottish zoologist and entomologist

Dr Daniel Stewart MacLagan FRSE FRES (3 June 1904 – 3 February 1991) was a 20th-century Scottish agricultural zoologist and entomologist. He was popularly known as Dan MacLagan.

== Life ==
He was born on 3 June 1904 at Williamstone Farm in Madderty near Crieff the son of a farmer.

He studied agricultural zoology at university and graduated in 1928. He then won a Ministry of Agriculture Scholarship enabling him to do further research at the Parasite Laboratory in the Imperial Institute of Entomology in London. He then spent a year doing further research at Harvard University in America. On his return to Scotland he received a prestigious Carnegie Research Fellowship at the University of Edinburgh and gained his first doctorate (DSc).

In 1934 he began lecturing at the University of Aberdeen, and in 1936 received his second doctorate (PhD). In 1937 he moved tom Durham University. In 1944 he returned to Scotland as Head of the Zoology Department at the West of Scotland Agricultural College in Glasgow. In 1946 he was elected a Fellow of the Royal Society of Edinburgh. His proposers were James Ritchie, Alfred E. Cameron, Maurice Yonge, and Alexander D. Peacock.

He retired from academia in 1969 and returned to Madderty to run the family farm. He died on 3 February 1991 at the Royal Victoria Hospital in Edinburgh. On his death he bequeathed monies to run entomological lectures in Glasgow and money to the Macaulay Institute in Aberdeen to provide scholarships to young scientists.
