= Sun Tower =

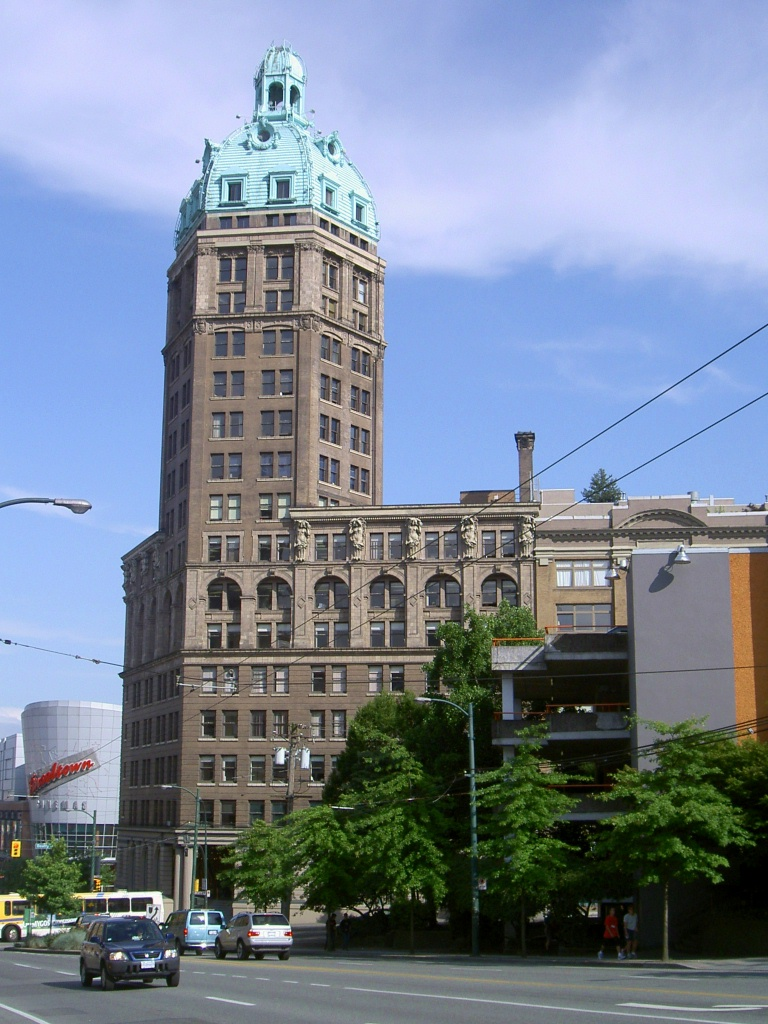
- Interactive map of the Sun Tower area
- Former names: World Building

General information
- Type: Commercial, offices
- Architectural style: Beaux-Arts
- Location: 128 West Pender Street; Vancouver, British Columbia
- Coordinates: 49.2810°N 123.1084°W
- Construction started: 1911
- Completed: 1912

Height
- Roof: 82.34 m (270.1 ft)

Technical details
- Floor area: 6,357 m^{2} (68,430 sq ft)
- Lifts/elevators: 3

Design and construction
- Architect: William Tuff Whiteway

The Sun Tower is a 17 storey 82 m (269 ft) Beaux-Arts building at 128 West Pender Street in Vancouver, British Columbia. It was known for its faux-patina steel dome painted to imitate copper cladding. In early February 2021 a newly finished roof clad in real penny-coloured copper tiles was revealed. The new roof was a part of restoration work that began on the heritage building in 2018. Nine nude muses, the "nine maidens" supporting the cornice line can be seen. The terracotta for this building, including the ladies, was made in Tamworth, Staffordshire, England by Gibbs and Canning Limited.

== History ==
The Sun Tower was commissioned by L. D. Taylor to house his newspaper, The Vancouver World. The intention was that the building would be visible throughout the World's circulation area as the tallest building in the city. John Coughland and Sons of Vancouver had 1,250 tons of steel fabricated for construction.

When it was completed in 1912, it was called the World Building and was the tallest building in Vancouver at 82 m (269 ft), surpassing the previous record-holder, the Dominion Building located just around the corner. (According to the heritage plaque, upon completion it was also the tallest in the British Empire.) For one year, it was the tallest building in Canada, until Toronto's 85 metre Canadian Pacific Building opened in 1913.

In 1918, droves of Vancouverites turned out to watch as Harry Gardiner, the "Human Fly", scaled the outside of the building. When The Vancouver Sun bought the building in 1937, it was renamed. Although The Sun newspaper has long since relocated, first to South Granville then to Granville Square, the building has retained its name.

Formerly 100 West Pender St, the City of Vancouver renumbered the Sun Tower's street address to 128 West Pender in 2011 in accordance with its strict street numbering bylaw when a new building was constructed on the vacant lot at the southwest corner of West Pender and Abbott Streets. It is by the Stadium-Chinatown Station SkyTrain.

== Architecture and materials ==
The Sun Tower was designed by architect William Tuff Whiteway, who also designed the original Woodward's building nearby. The building takes the form of an eight-storey, L-shaped block, surmounted by a nine-storey hexagonal-section tower. The tower is capped by a Beaux-Arts dome and cupola. The structure of the tower is steel, which is dominantly clad in a combination of terracotta tiles and rusticated brickwork. The dome itself, although painted to resemble patinated copper, is steel.

The exterior is adorned with nine terracotta caryatids supporting the cornice, sculpted by Charles Marega. These apparently caused a minor scandal among some of Vancouver's citizenry at the building's opening, as the female figures are depicted partially clothed, with naked breasts, and were considered to be adopting "sensuous" poses. Further decorative detailing is provided by carved stone sills under all windows, manufactured from local volcanic andesite from Haddington Island. Haddington Island andesite is also used for some of the decorative carvings near the top of the tower, that feature animal skulls surrounded by garlands of fruit and flowers.

== Anchor tenants ==
- 1912–1917: The Vancouver World
- 1924–1937: Bekins Moving and Storage
- 1937–1965: The Vancouver Sun
- 1968–1996: Geological Survey of Canada
- 2001–2005: Navarik
- 2009–2016: Victory Square Law Office LLP
- 2016–present: IT Glue Software
- 2022-present: Vancouver Indigenous Justice Centre

== Future ==
It was announced on March 19, 2008, that the Sun Tower had been sold to new owners on March 17. The purchase price was not announced, but the building had a 2008 assessed value of CA$6.16 million. The new owners promised to restore the heritage building.

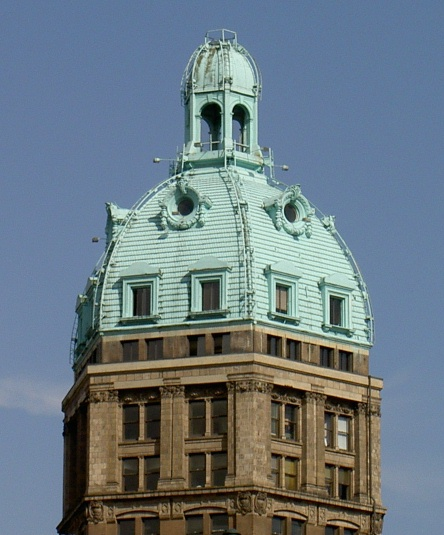
Dome Detail

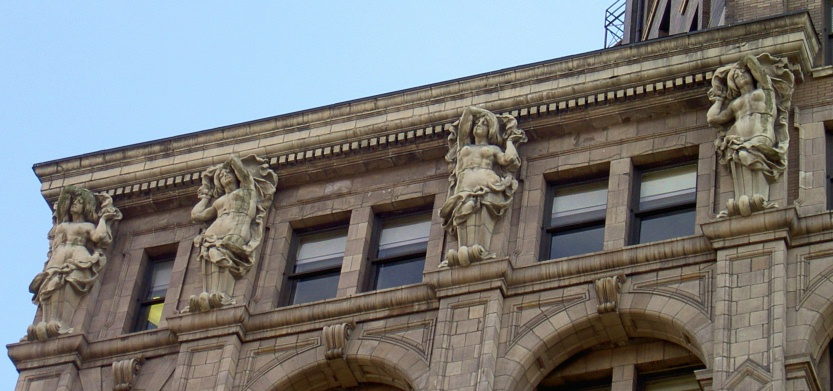
Cornice Detail

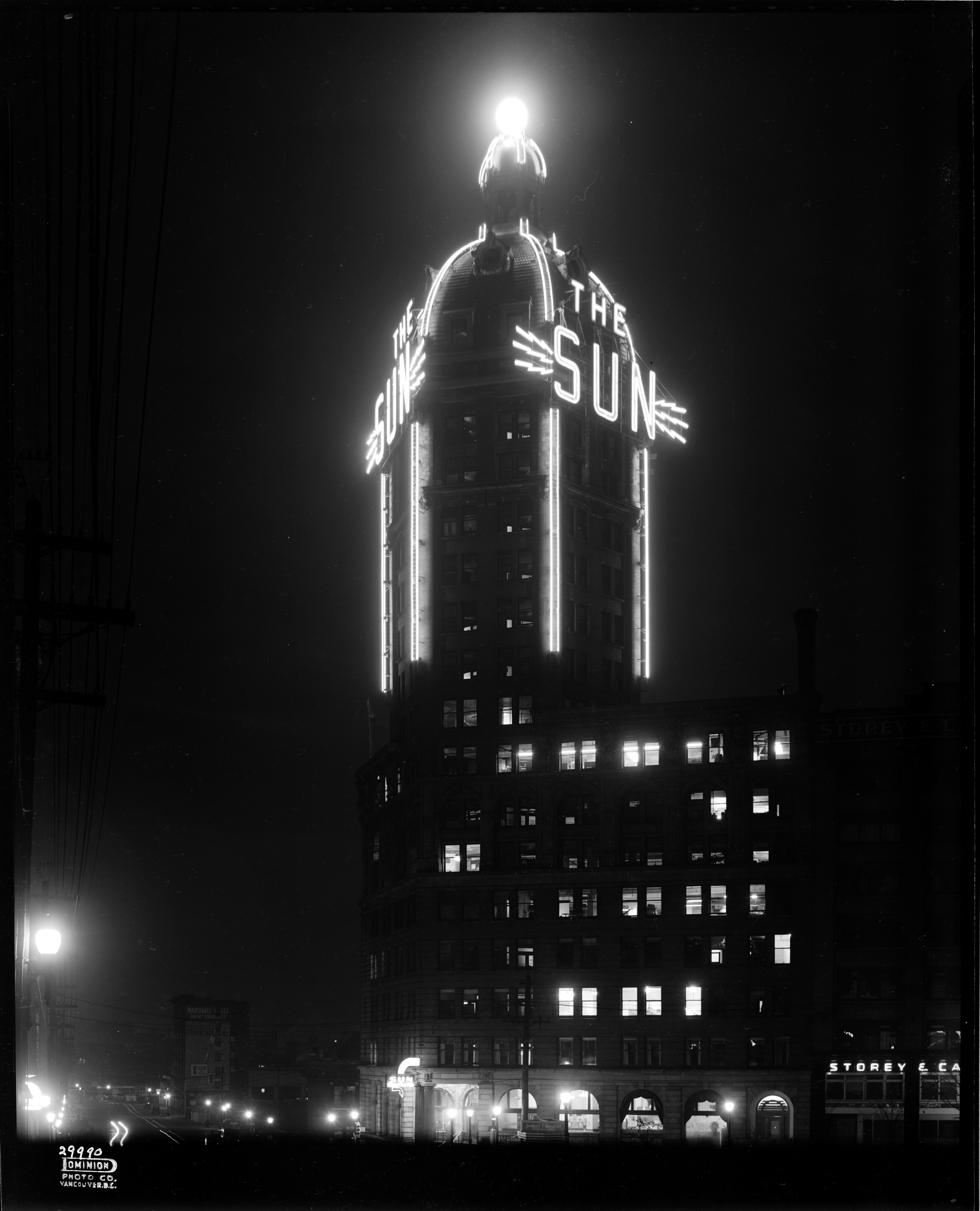
Neon 'Sun' sign and beacon at night (1946)

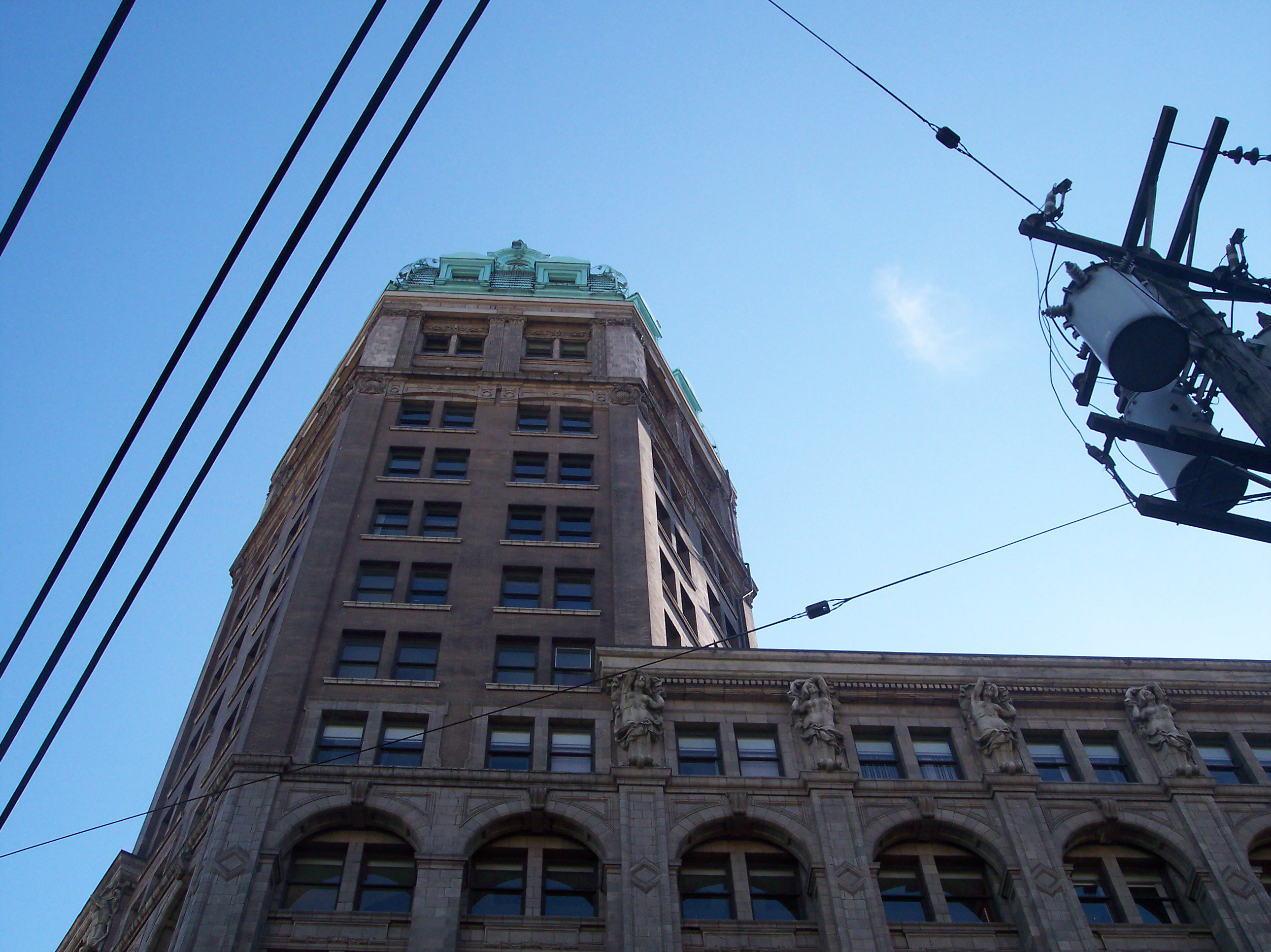

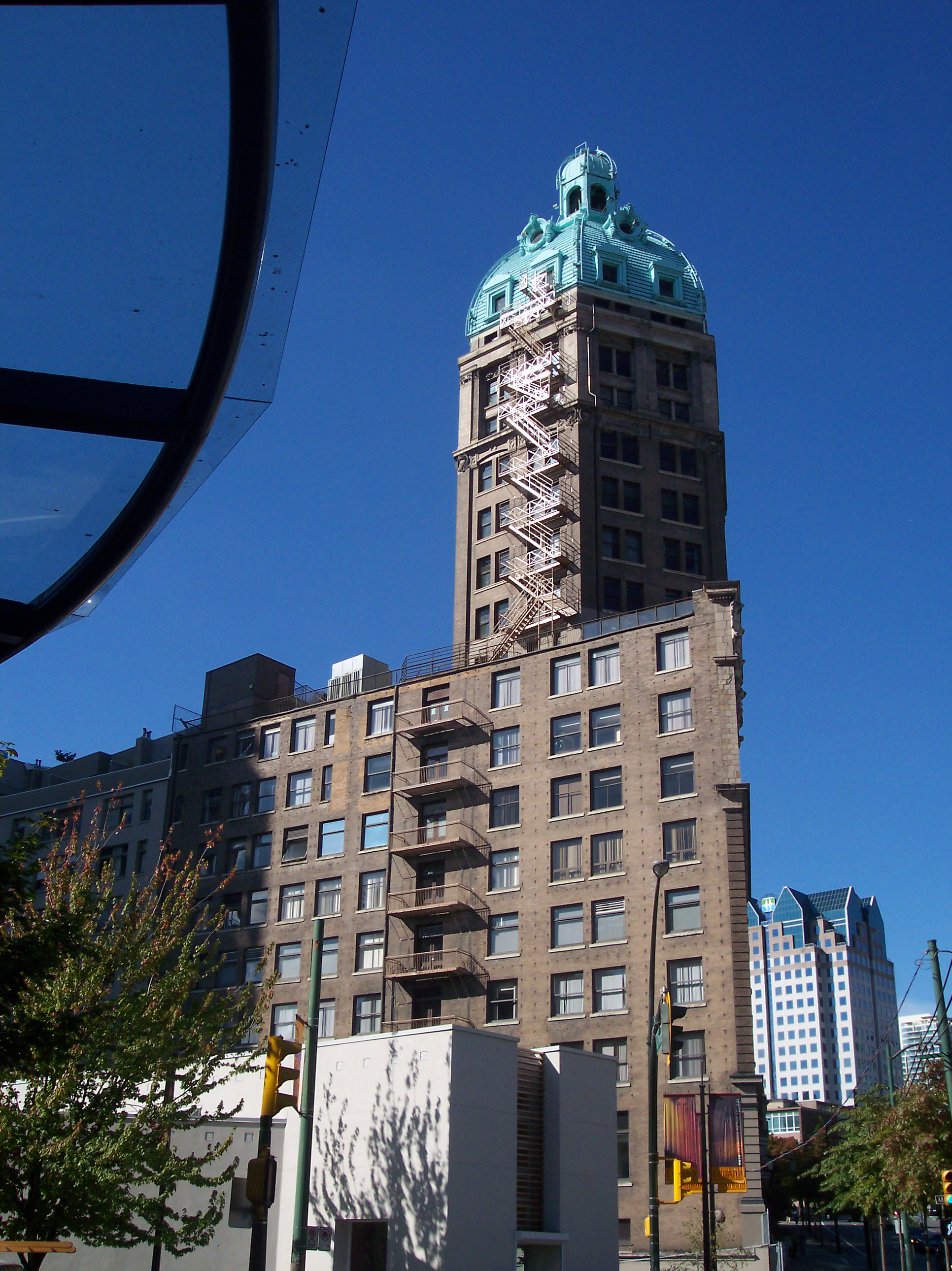

== In popular culture ==
The exterior of the Sun Tower is used in The CW's superhero television series Smallville to depict the Watchtower, the operational headquarter of DC Comics' Justice League. In the show, the tower is digitally modified to be a clock tower with six turret clocks on its dome and is enhanced to look taller, being the highest building in Metropolis in certain shots. The exterior was also used as a filming location for The Twilight Saga: Breaking Dawn - Part 2.

== See also ==
- List of heritage buildings in Vancouver
- List of old Canadian buildings
- List of tallest buildings in Vancouver
