= Vancouver Sun =

Canadian daily newspaper

- Seriously Westcoast
- Type: Daily newspaper
- Format: Broadsheet
- Owner: Postmedia Network Inc.
- Editor-in-chief: Harold Munro
- Founded: 12 February 1912; 114 years ago
- Language: English
- Headquarters: 400-2985 Virtual Way, Vancouver, B.C., V5M 4X7
- ISSN: 0832-1299
- Website: vancouversun.com

The Vancouver Sun, also known as the Sun, is a daily broadsheet newspaper based in Vancouver, British Columbia, Canada. The newspaper is published by the Pacific Newspaper Group, a division of the Postmedia Network. It is published five days a week from Tuesday to Saturday and is the largest newspaper in western Canada by circulation.

The newspaper was first published on 12 February 1912. It quickly expanded by acquiring other papers, such as the Daily News-Advertiser and The Evening World. In 1963, the Cromie family sold the majority of its holdings in the Sun to FP Publications, who later sold the newspaper to Southam Inc. in 1980. The newspaper was taken over by Hollinger Inc. in 1992, and was later sold again to CanWest in 2000. In 2010, the newspaper became part of the Postmedia Network as a result of the collapse of CanWest.

== History ==
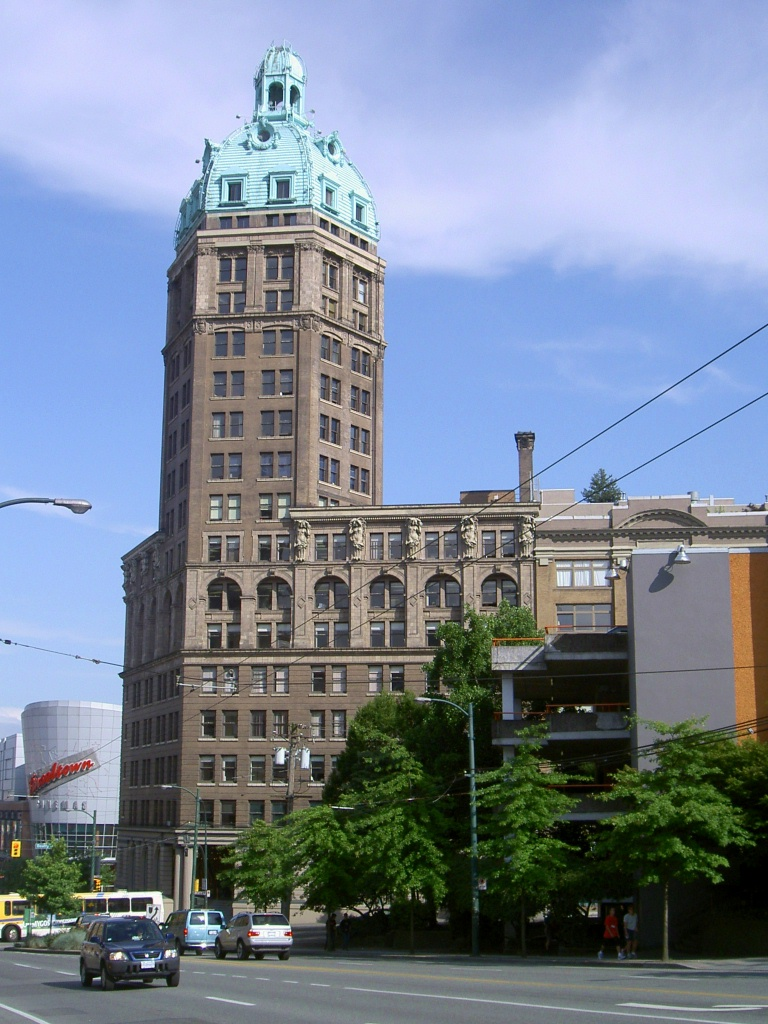
The Sun Tower housed the Sun's offices from 1937 to 1965.

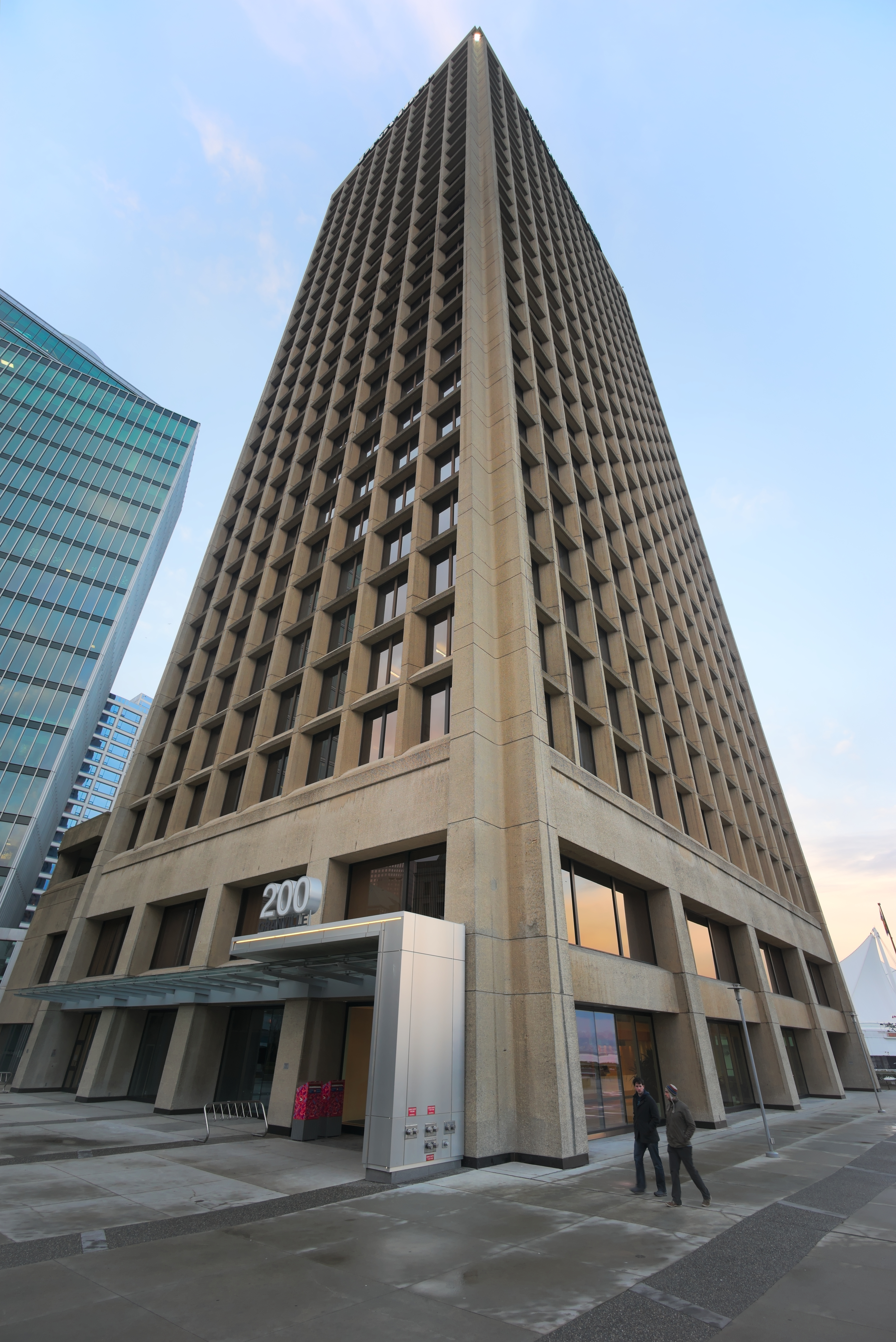
Granville Square housed the Sun's offices from 1997 to 2015.

The Vancouver Sun published its first edition on 12 February 1912. The newspaper was originally based at 125 West Pender Street, just around the corner from The Vancouver Daily Province, its rival at the time. In 1917, the Sun acquired the Daily News-Advertiser, a newspaper that was established in 1886. From 1917 until his death in 1936, its publisher was Robert James Cromie. In 1924, the Sun acquired The Evening World, another newspaper established in 1888.

In March 1937, a fire destroyed the Sun's business and editorial offices. The only death was the janitor, who suffered minor burns and smoke inhalation. The Sun promptly moved across the street into the World Building, where the World had been published. The building was accordingly renamed the Sun Tower.

The Sun emerged as the city's leading newspaper after The Vancouver Daily Province experienced a lengthy labour dispute from 1946 to 1949.

In 1958, the Vancouver Sun and The Province joined to create the Pacific Press in response to the rising costs of producing newspapers. First the papers merged their mechanical and financial departments, then they both moved into the Pacific Press Building on December 27, 1965.

In 1963, the majority of the Cromie family holdings in the newspaper were sold to FP Publications, who later sold it to Southam Inc. in 1980. In 1992, the newspaper was taken over by Conrad Black's Hollinger Inc.

The newspaper's photography department became the first in the world to fully switch over to digital photography following the 1994 release of the Kodak DCS 400 series, which used a Nikon F90 body; the camera was developed by Kodak in collaboration with The Associated Press and each unit cost $16,950.

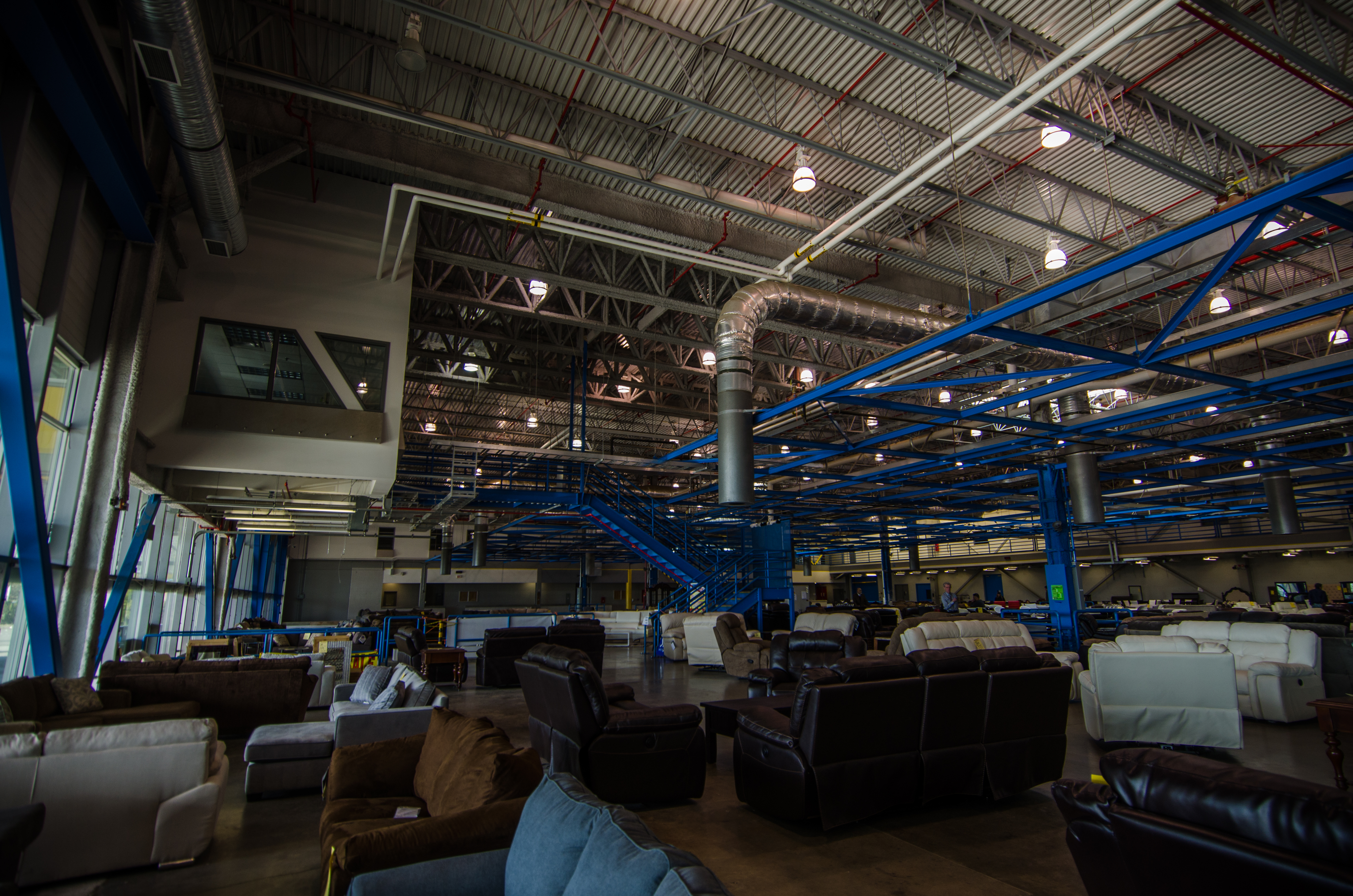
Inside the Kennedy Heights printing facility used by the Sun. The facility opened in 1997.

In 1997, Kennedy Heights, the printing press for the Vancouver Sun and The Province, was opened in Surrey. Later in 1997 the paper moved to Granville Square. In 2000, the newspaper was sold to CanWest.

In May 2009, the newspaper laid off long-time editorial cartoonist Roy Peterson who had been drawing for the paper since 1962.

In 2010, the newspaper became part of the Postmedia Network, as a result of the collapse of CanWest. In December 2011, after much research on the demographics of the greater Vancouver area, the newspaper launched a Chinese-language version Taiyangbao with original Chinese language content. According to an article broadcast on China Now on China Radio International (December 2011), the key to success was not necessarily to "translate" its English-language version into Chinese.

In January 2015, the Kennedy Heights printing press operation was shut down, resulting in 220 workers losing their jobs. Printing of the Vancouver Sun and The Province were outsourced, each to different printing press operations.

In 2017, the Vancouver Sun and The Province moved to East Vancouver, to the Broadway Tech Centre.

In October 2022, the Vancouver Sun and The Province stopped printing the Monday editions.

In 2023, Postmedia Network announced that they would be closing the newsrooms of the Vancouver Sun and its sister paper, the Province, asking all journalists to work from home.

== Content ==
As a broadsheet newspaper, the Sun was not originally related to the Sun Media chain and its tabloid Sun papers in Toronto, Ottawa, Winnipeg, Calgary, and Edmonton. However, the Vancouver Sun and the tabloid Sun papers have been part of the same company since 2015, as a result of Postmedia's acquisition of Sun Media.

=== Editorial stances ===
The newspaper was first established in 1912 to "consistently advocate the principles of Liberalism". Under the Cromie family, the newspaper typically supported the Liberals, although they were often critical as well. Under Hollinger Inc., the newspaper was considered a middlebrow newspaper with a more socially and economically diverse readership than its competitor. While publishing under Hollinger, the Sun's editorials, op-ed articles, and guest columns were unambiguously critical of the federal Liberal government.

== Circulation ==
The Vancouver Sun has seen, like most Canadian daily newspapers, a decline in circulation. Its total circulation dropped by 22 percent to 136,787 copies daily from 2009 to 2015.

Daily average

== Notable staff ==
- Kim Bolan, crime
- Hal Sigurdson (1966 to 1976), assistant sports editor

== See also ==
- List of newspapers in Canada
- List of newspapers in Canada by circulation
- Media in Vancouver
- Vancouver Sun Run
