= John McLagan =

John James Campbell McLagan (July 22, 1838 – April 11, 1901) was a newspaper publisher born in Strathardle, Scotland. He later moved to Ontario, Canada, where he managed the Guelph Mercury with MP James Innes. After living in Winnipeg he moved to Victoria sometime in late 1883. In Victoria he dealt in real estate and filed stories with Toronto Globe. From 1884 to 1888 he operated the Victoria Times. He moved again to Vancouver, where, from September 1887 until his death on April 11, 1901, he published Vancouver Daily World. In his last months, he managed the newspaper from his bed.

During his life he married Sara Anne MacLure as well as write plays and novels. Sara Anne and John had three daughters and a son (Lt Patrick Douglas Maclure McLagan, who died on October 15, 1917, and is buried in Dickebusch Road Cemetery).
