= The Vancouver Daily World =

Canadian newspaper

The Vancouver Daily World (also known as The Vancouver World or simply The World) was a newspaper once published in Vancouver, British Columbia. It was founded in 1888 by John McLagan, the editor of the paper. In 1901, when John McLagan died, his widow, Sara Anne McLagan, became the first woman publisher of a daily newspaper in Canada. She also became managing editor, editorial writer, proof reader and an occasional reporter.

In 1905, L. D. Taylor, along with other interest parties, bought The Vancouver World newspaper. Taylor transformed the paper from a small twelve-page daily to a modern newspaper which eventually grew in circulation to challenge The Province.

Construction of The Daily World's headquarters, The World Building (later renamed The Sun Tower), was completed in 1912. The building was designed to be seen throughout the newspaper's circulation area and was the tallest building in the British Empire at the time of completion.

The World, as well as Taylor, would later suffer financial difficulty. In 1924, The Vancouver Sun bought The Vancouver World.
