= Burrard Peninsula =

Peninsula in southwest British Columbia, Canada

Coordinates: 49°14′45″N 123°01′00″W

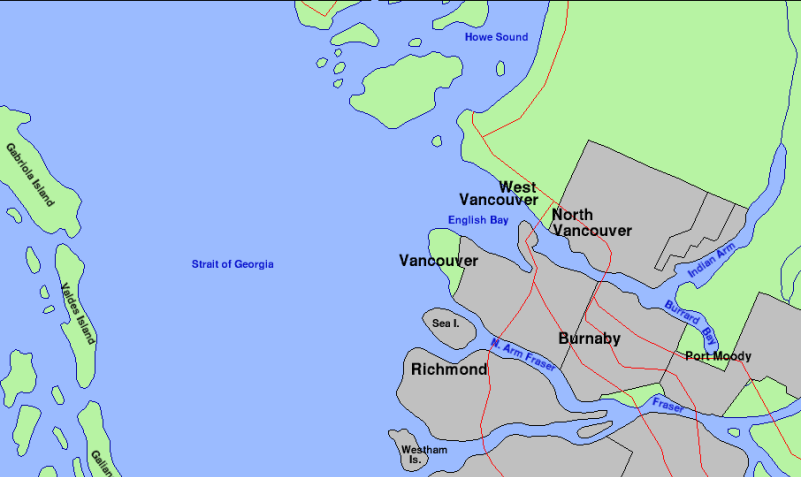
Map of the Burrard Peninsula (right centre). The map is oriented with north-northwest facing up. The peninsula is flanked by Burrard Inlet to the north and the Fraser River delta to the south.

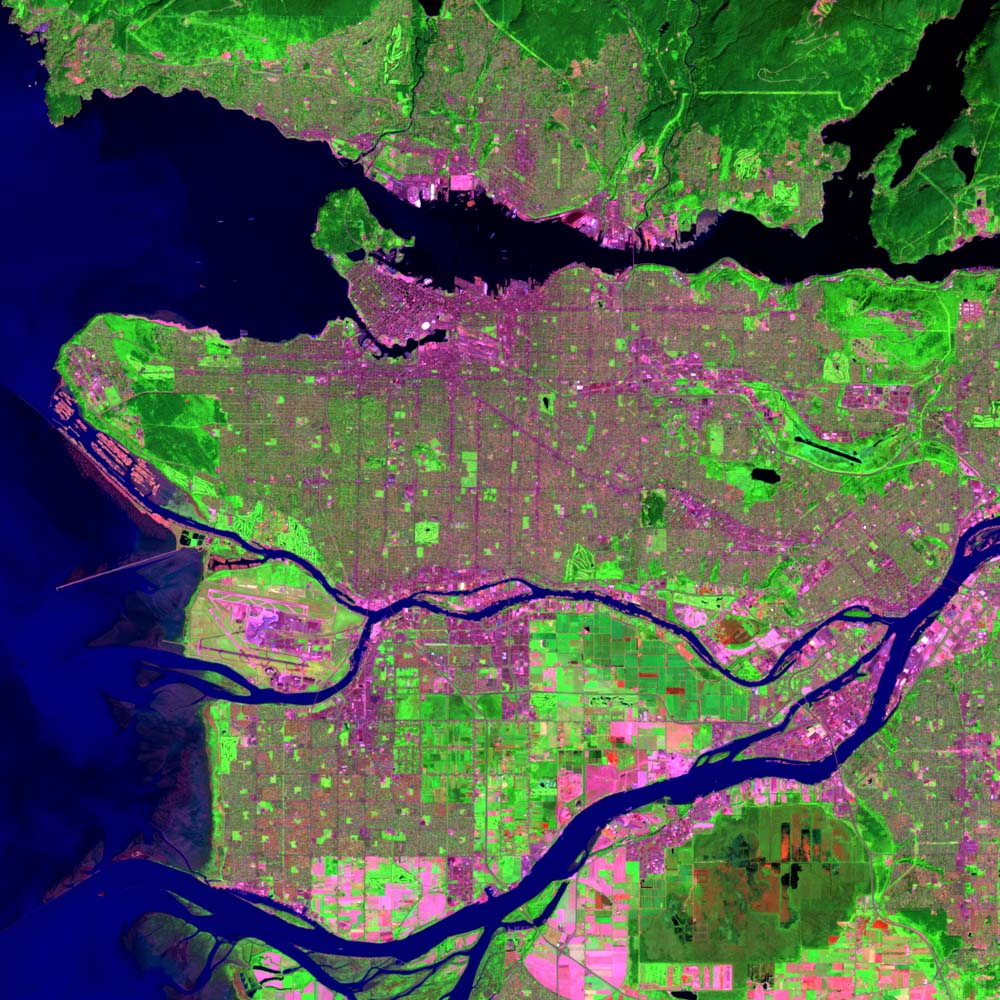
False-colour satellite photo of Vancouver region, with the western and central sections (Vancouver, Burnaby, and New Westminster) of the Burrard Peninsula visible.

The Burrard Peninsula (Squamish: Ulksen) is a peninsula in the Lower Mainland region of British Columbia, Canada, bounded by the Burrard Inlet to the north, the Georgia Strait to the west, the North Arm of Fraser River to the south, and the Pitt River and Douglas Island to the east. The City of Vancouver occupies almost all of the western half of the peninsula, and the Cities of Burnaby and New Westminster occupy more than half of the eastern half. At its northeastern end, the peninsula is connected to the Eagle Mountain and Mount Burke of the Coast Mountains via a small isthmus at the center of the Tri-Cities.

The Salish name for the Burrard Peninsula as a whole — or rather, for the long rise of land from Point Grey to Central Park — was Ulksen or Ulxen (Halkomelem: ʔəlqsən). The name Burrard Peninsula is rarely used in casual reference to the area among locals, who favour naming a specific community or neighbourhood therein.

== Extent ==
There is no clear consensus on where the peninsula ends, as the Burrard Peninsula does not appear in official government gazetteers (directories of geographical features) and does not exist as a legal entity, thus having no legal definition. The peninsula is, however, attached to the mainland at its northeastern end, and as a matter of convenience, the isthmus may be taken to follow the main line of the Canadian Pacific Railway (CPR) across the relatively narrow, low neck of land from Port Moody at the eastern end of Burrard Inlet, through Coquitlam and Port Coquitlam southeast to the bank of Pitt River. From where the CPR tracks cross the Pitt River, the Burrard Peninsula runs due west for approximately 40 km (25 mi) to Point Grey. The peninsula is approximately 6–8 km (3.7–5.0 mi) wide (north-south) for much of its length. Though it is a peninsula and is attached to the mainland, it cannot be accessed directly from the mainland without crossing some body of water - either the Pitt River, the Fraser River, or the Burrard Inlet - as the connection to the mainland is blocked by Coquitlam Mountain and other mountainous terrain.

== Municipalities ==
Municipalities on the peninsula include — in roughly west-to-east order—the Cities of Vancouver, Burnaby, New Westminster, Port Moody, Coquitlam and Port Coquitlam. The University Endowment Lands and the main campus of University of British Columbia occupy the unincorporated territory of Point Grey at the far west end of the peninsula. Northwest of the peninsular neck are the villages of Belcarra and Anmore, both of which are not part of the peninsula proper but are only accessible by road via the Burrard Peninsula.

== Landforms ==
The Burrard Peninsula, for the most part, consists of a hilly low plateau reaching a maximum elevation between 100 and 150 metres (330 and 490 ft) above sea level in most places. The plateau is bisected by a low depression running northwest to southeast, consisting of (running from west to east):

- False Creek, separating the peninsula proper from Downtown Vancouver, which sits on a peninsular offshoot referred to as "Downtown Peninsula" or occasionally "Coal Peninsula"
- the Canadian National Railway (CN) and Burlington Northern Santa Fe (BNSF) railway yards, which sit on reclaimed land at the east end of False Creek;
- the Grandview Cut, a trench that accommodates CNR/BNSF and SkyTrain tracks;
- Still Creek, which drains into Burnaby Lake;
- Burnaby Lake, which drains into the Brunette River; and
- the Brunette River, which is the last tributary of any significant size of the Fraser River, joining the Fraser at New Westminster.

Punctuating the plateau are several prominences of land including Little Mountain (a dormant volcano, approximately 170 metres above sea level) in Vancouver, and Capitol Hill (approximately 220 metres) and Burnaby Mountain (home to the main campus of Simon Fraser University; approximately 380 metres) in Burnaby. The plateau is flanked at its eastern end by the Coquitlam River, which flows south from Coquitlam Lake on the mainland into the Fraser River, its mouth lying upstream from the Brunette River. The land east of the Coquitlam River is largely flat and lying close to sea level, except for the stand-alone rise of Mary Hill in Port Coquitlam (approximately 70 metres).

== Land use ==
The Burrard Peninsula has been extensively urbanized, and includes the largest and densest populations in the Metro Vancouver region, and in British Columbia more generally.

While originally extensively forested, since the mid-19th century the Burrard Peninsula has gradually become essentially one large cityscape. Its largest remaining green spaces include Pacific Spirit Regional Park in Point Grey, Stanley Park in Downtown Vancouver, the areas around Burnaby Mountain, Central Park, Burnaby Lake, and Deer Lake in Burnaby, and Mundy Park and the Coquitlam River in Coquitlam.
