= Pinecone Burke Provincial Park =

Provincial park in British Columbia, Canada

Pinecone-Burke Provincial Park
- IUCN category II (national park)
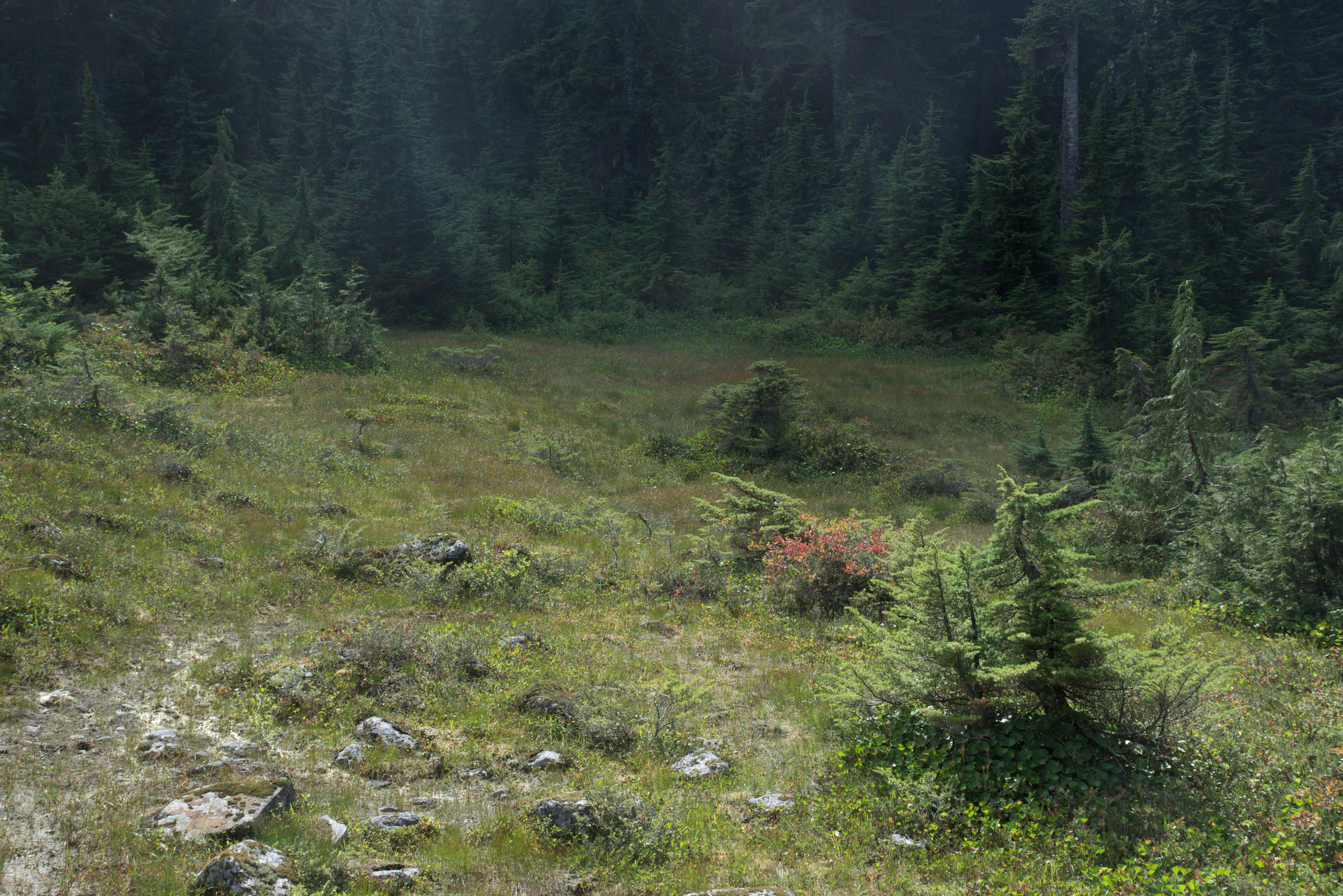
- An alpine meadow in Pinecone Burke Park

- Location within British Columbia Location within Greater Vancouver Regional District
- Interactive map of Pinecone-Burke Provincial Park
- Location: Metro Vancouver, British Columbia, Canada
- Nearest city: Coquitlam
- Coordinates: 49°31′44″N 122°41′29″W
- Area: 380 km^{2} (150 sq mi)
- Established: 1995
- Governing body: BC Parks
- Website: bcparks.ca/pinecone-burke-park/

Pinecone Burke Provincial Park is a provincial park in British Columbia, Canada. It extends from the southwest corner of Garibaldi Provincial Park, west of Pitt Lake and Pitt River to include Burke Mountain in the City of Coquitlam. Most of the park is unserviced wilderness with very rough trails such as the Fools Gold Trail in the Boise Valley. There is canoe access to Widgeon Slough and from there hiking trails that lead to Widgeon Lake, and a network of old logging roads, hiking and mountain biking trails on Burke Mountain. Visitors can also use the park for camping, backcountry skiing, and snowshoeing.

Before being protected, the park area was logged and mined. The park's boundaries were established in 1995 by the provincial government and covers 38,000 hectares. Parts of the park's boundaries are located in the Katzie First Nation, Kwikwetlem First Nation, and Stó:lō First Nation's territories. The park's diverse ecosystems supports several different species on land and in its inlet. There are six species that have been labeled as sensitive or vulnerable that live in the park.

== History and past use of the area ==
Pinecone Burke Provincial Park has part of its boundary on Katzie First Nation, Kwikwetlem First Nation, and Stó:lō First Nations territory. These First Nation territories have existed for approximately 10,000 years.

During the 1920s, the Canadian Robert Dollar Company of Dollarton logged the lower slopes of Burke Mountain with a steam railway. The peak was called Dollar Mountain by early residents. Rail lines snaked in from Port Moody along the sidehill of Westwood slope, across the Coquitlam River on a trestle bridge and up to the timber on Burke Mountain. As the area was depopulated for many years, bush logging and gravel mining continued with vigour. Europeans settling in British Columbia began to climb various mountain peaks in the park. North of Widgeon Lake, an area called Five Fingers was of interest to early hikers, and where many first ascents were recorded. Before protection of the park, forest areas were logged and mined. Old forgotten steam donkeys and mine tunnels are a remnant of past resource extraction in the park. In the late 1980s and early 1990s there were proposals from logging companies to increase harvesting rates of trees in the park area.

== Geography ==
The highest mountain in the park is Pinecone Peak at 2027 m (6650 ft). Second-highest is Meslilloet Mountain at 1,990 m (6,529 ft).

== Establishment of the protected area ==
Conservation groups in the area like Friends of Burke Mountain and Burke Mountain Naturalists were formed by concerned citizens to oppose the logging. Friends of Burke Mountain worked towards protecting the Pinecone Burke Provincial Park area and including it in the Lower Mainland Nature Legacy, a group of parks within the southwestern region of British Columbia which were viewed as ecologically significant, and labelled as protected parks. The initial goals were to conserve the park and its contents, as well as the western shore of Pitt Lake (the largest freshwater tidal lake in North America). With increased public awareness of conservation efforts for the park and the assistance of the Western Canada Wilderness Committee, the park was finally protected by the provincial government in 1995.

=== Park boundaries ===
The provincial park covers 38,000 hectares, stretching across Coquitlam and Maple Ridge. Pinecone Burke Provincial Park extends its western boundary along Burke Mountain Coquitlam, BC, to its eastern boundary to west shore of Pitt Lake in Maple Ridge, BC. Finally, the northern end of Pinecone Burke Provincial Park meets with the southwestern tip of Garibaldi Provincial Park. Because of the vast size of the park and the boundaries, there are multiple points of access. This protected park is accessible by multiple different means: access points by boat, trails, and logging roads. The boundaries of Pinecone Burke Provincial Park were chosen because within the protected boundaries lies old growth forests, alpine lakes, and remnant ice fields. Furthermore, the diverse geography and terrain houses a variety different of species inhabiting the provincial park.

== Management of the park ==
=== Indigenous perspectives ===
The Katzie First Nation is working to ensure that this area within the provincial park stays protected according to traditional Katzie principles. The Katzie First Nation formerly utilized this area heavily for hunting and gathering. BC Parks and the Katzie First Nation have agreed on a memorandum of understanding together, which has implications on the future of how the park is managed. Before this memorandum of understanding was established, it appears that there was no initiative taken to include the First Nations. However, with this memorandum of understanding, it was established to have the Katzie First Nation's practices recognized by potential third-parties. These third parties would help contribute further to the growth of various parks around British Columbia. The management plan for Pinecone Burke Provincial Park between the two parties was established in Fall of 2014. BC Parks claims they are working with the aforementioned First Nations who have territory overlapping with the 1995 boundaries of the park. Together, along with the Municipal Government of Coquitlam, they are working regarding the future of the park.

=== Current management ===
Today, Pinecone Burke Provincial Park is managed by BC Parks. In recent years there has been limited parks operations due to its inaccessibility and unpopularity. A management plan is now in development in collaboration with BC Parks, the city of Coquitlam and the Katzie First Nation. The development plan is currently on stage 2: The Development of the Draft Management Plans. The current goals of the development plan is to develop the recreational use of the provincial park to boost nature based tourism, while minimizing economical damage and promoting conservation.

== Ecology ==
=== Fauna ===
Pinecone Burke Provincial Park has diverse ecosystems that support various animal and plant species. Mammals such as the black-tailed deer, mountain goats, and bobcats have been recorded at the park. The park also has two types of bears, Grizzly and black bears, that inhabit the area. Pinecone Burke Provincial Park also supports several marine species that live in the park's inlet. These fish include Pacific salmon, cutthroat and steelhead trout, and the migratory Dolly Varden char. Pinecone Burke Provincial Park also has five amphibian species. Furthermore, BC's Wildlife inventory has documented 46 different bird species.

There are currently six animal species found in the park that are labelled as sensitive or vulnerable: the blue heron, tailed frog, shrew mole, Vaux's swift, Huttons' vireo, and the Pacific Jumping mouse.

=== Flora ===
Many fungi and plant species live in this coniferous forest. Community members have used iNaturalist to record sightings of fungi such as hair ice (found to form when Exidiopsis effusa is present), the common bonnet and the turkey-tail. Plant species include licorices and western sword ferns, vine maple, bearberry, swamp currant and bog Labrador tea. Plants like the bog Labrador are able to grow because of Widgeon Valley's nationally-recognized wetlands. Within the park there are diverse tree species that can be found all over British Columbia. Trees such as the western hemlock, Douglas fir, bigleaf maple and red alder are some of the main species that grow in the park.

== Visitors ==
Visitors to the park hike and camp in the summer and backcountry ski or snowshoe in the winter. Hikers can find their way through mapped trails on Burke Mountain and more rugged trails further north in the park. Fourteen peaks and numerous lakes lay within the boundary of the park. Camping is available at informal backcountry/wilderness sites as long as campers don't damage the ecosystems. Visitors to the park can canoe to trailheads and campsites from the waters of the Widgeon Valley and Pitt Lake.

== See also ==
- List of British Columbia Provincial Parks
- List of protected areas of British Columbia
