= University Hill Secondary School =

Public high school near Vancouver, British Columbia

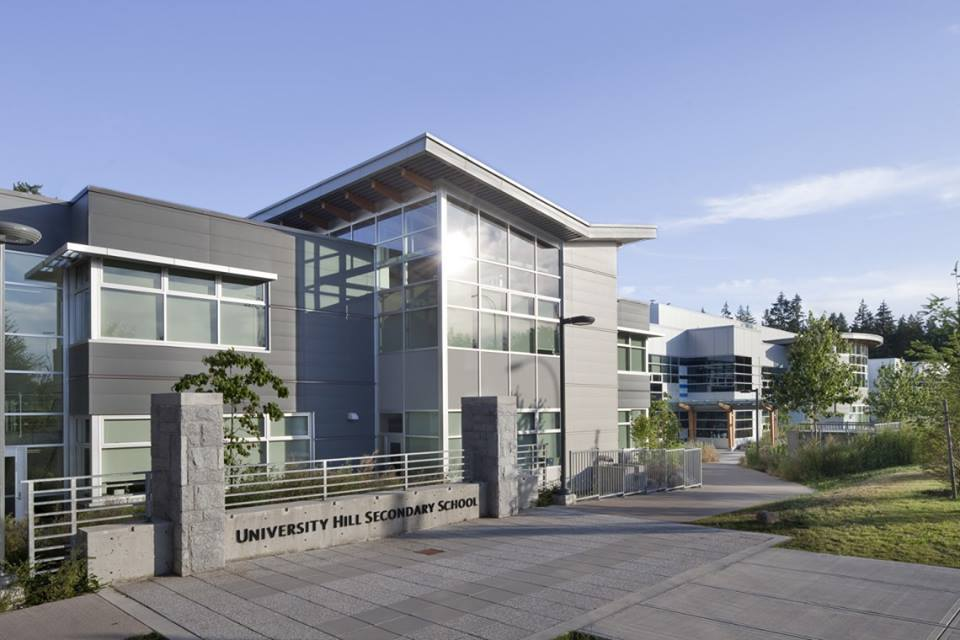

Location
- 3228 Ross Drive; Vancouver, British Columbia, V6T 1S2; Canada; 49.2538°N 123.2400°W

Information
- Type: Secondary school
- Motto: No Stranger Among Us
- Founded: 1927
- School district: School District 39 Vancouver
- Superintendent: Helen McGregor
- Area trustee: Alfred Chien
- School number: 3939024
- Principal: Travis Bell
- Grades: 8–12
- Enrollment: 920 (2025–26)
- Colour: Purple Teal
- Mascot: Hawk
- Team name: Hawks
- Website: uhs.vsb.bc.ca

University Hill Secondary School (generally known as U-Hill or Uhill) is a public secondary school in the neighbourhood of Wesbrook Place in Point Grey Campus, just west of the University Endowment Lands and the city limits of Vancouver, British Columbia, Canada.

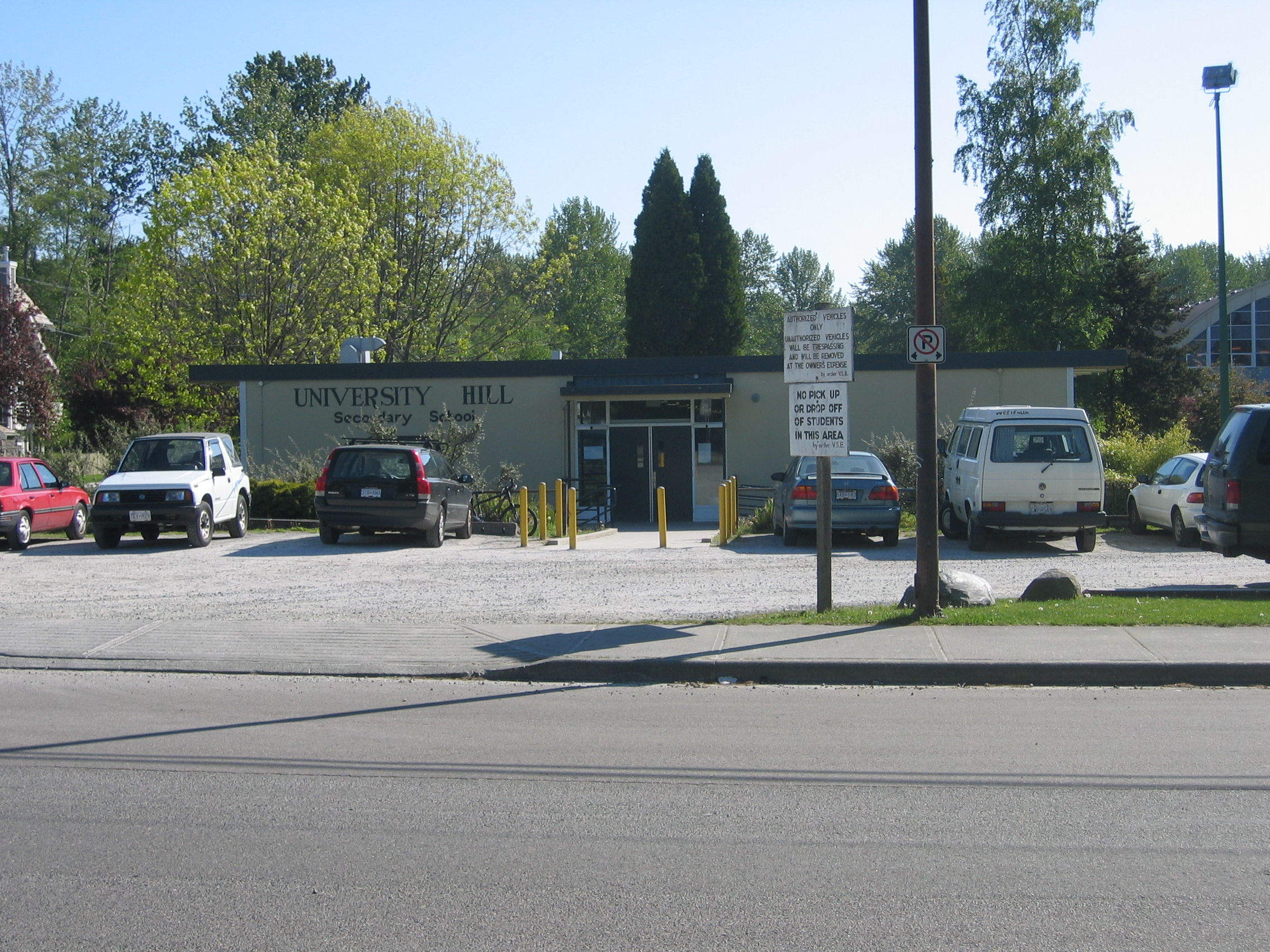
The former University Hill Secondary School.

== History ==
University Hill School began as a kindergarten to grade 12 school in September, 1927, on the site of what is now University Hill Elementary School. The K–12 school remained on that site until 1954, when the secondary school split from the elementary school and was built on a site on Acadia Road. Both schools were run by its own unique school board from 1927 to 1971, by special UEL elections. In 1971, the schools joined the Vancouver School Board.

In 2013, the school moved to a new, larger building in Wesbrook Place in UBC. The former location became the location for the newly established Norma Rose Point Elementary.

The school is situated next to Pacific Spirit Regional Park. University Hill's school colour is purple. There are two logos, one is historical and popular, with UHS on a traditional shield; and the other is a stylized hawk symbolizing an affinity with nature and a commitment to action. In 2003, the school marked its 75th anniversary.

== Academic record ==
Since the school moved into a brand new facility on the UBC campus, the school's test scores have dropped considerably. In 2017 the school was rated 6.1/10.0, in 2018 the school was rated 5.2/10.0, and in 2019 the school was rated 5.3/10. The school is ranked 167th in BC, according to the Fraser Institute.

In the past, the school was ranked as the number one public secondary school in British Columbia, according to the Fraser Institute. At one point it even scored a perfect score. However, the ranking's methodology is controversial.

== Athletics ==
University Hill offers a variety of sports to its students including volleyball, soccer, rugby, table tennis, badminton, and basketball. In the fall, Junior and Senior Girls Volleyball is played in Vancouver Secondary Schools' leagues as well as Senior Boys' soccer. In the winter, basketball and table tennis are offered for both boys and girls. Boys' Volleyball, girls' soccer, and boys' and girls' tennis are offered in the spring. In addition, badminton is also offered throughout the year. All school teams are known as the U-Hill Hawks. In 1999–2000, The Hawks became provincial champions in swimming. Their team won by a landslide, setting several new records in both individual and relay events. All but one of the 9 records held by the U-Hill swim team are still standing. Ironically, there hasn't been a swim team since the Provincials in 2000. The U-Hill track and field team placed third in the cities in 2008. Their junior boys team came in first overall in 2007 and 2009. The U-Hill golf team was started up in 2007–08 year and in the spring of 2009 U-Hill won City Championships. However they were neglected from the AAA golf provincials for having been registered as a AA school. The U-Hill senior girls soccer team won the AA city championships in 1995 and 1996. The senior boys soccer team won the AA city championships in 1999 and 2004. They also made it to the city finals in the years 2006 and 2007. In 2014 the U-Hill girl's table tennis team took home the provincial championship beating out Burnaby North Secondary School in team competition and Magee Secondary School in singles competition. In 2017, the juvenile boys basketball team finished 2nd in Vancouver and 10th in the province. In November 2017, the Junior Girls' volleyball team won gold in the city finals and the Senior Girls' volleyball team placed 2nd place in the final. One year after the volleyball city finals, the Uhill Senior Boys Soccer team also captured the school's very first championship for the sport.

== Strategies Program ==
A service open to students in the GVRD for those with learning disabilities. Courses are modified from the regular curriculum. Most student timetables are partially integrated with regular courses.

== Notable alumni ==
- Gordon Campbell, (Class of 1966), former Premier of British Columbia and former Canadian High Commissioner to the United Kingdom of Great Britain and Northern Ireland
- Torrance Coombs, (Class of 2002), actor on The CW's Reign
- Emi Nakamura, (Class of 1997), economist. Awarded the John Bates Clark Medal in 2019
- Pat Onstad, (Class of 1986), retired professional soccer player, MLS Cup champion and member of the Canadian Soccer Hall of Fame (2015)
- David Vertesi, (Class of 2002), vocals/bass player for Hey Ocean! and co-founder of the Vancouver Mural Festival
- Changpeng Zhao, co-founder and CEO of Binance
