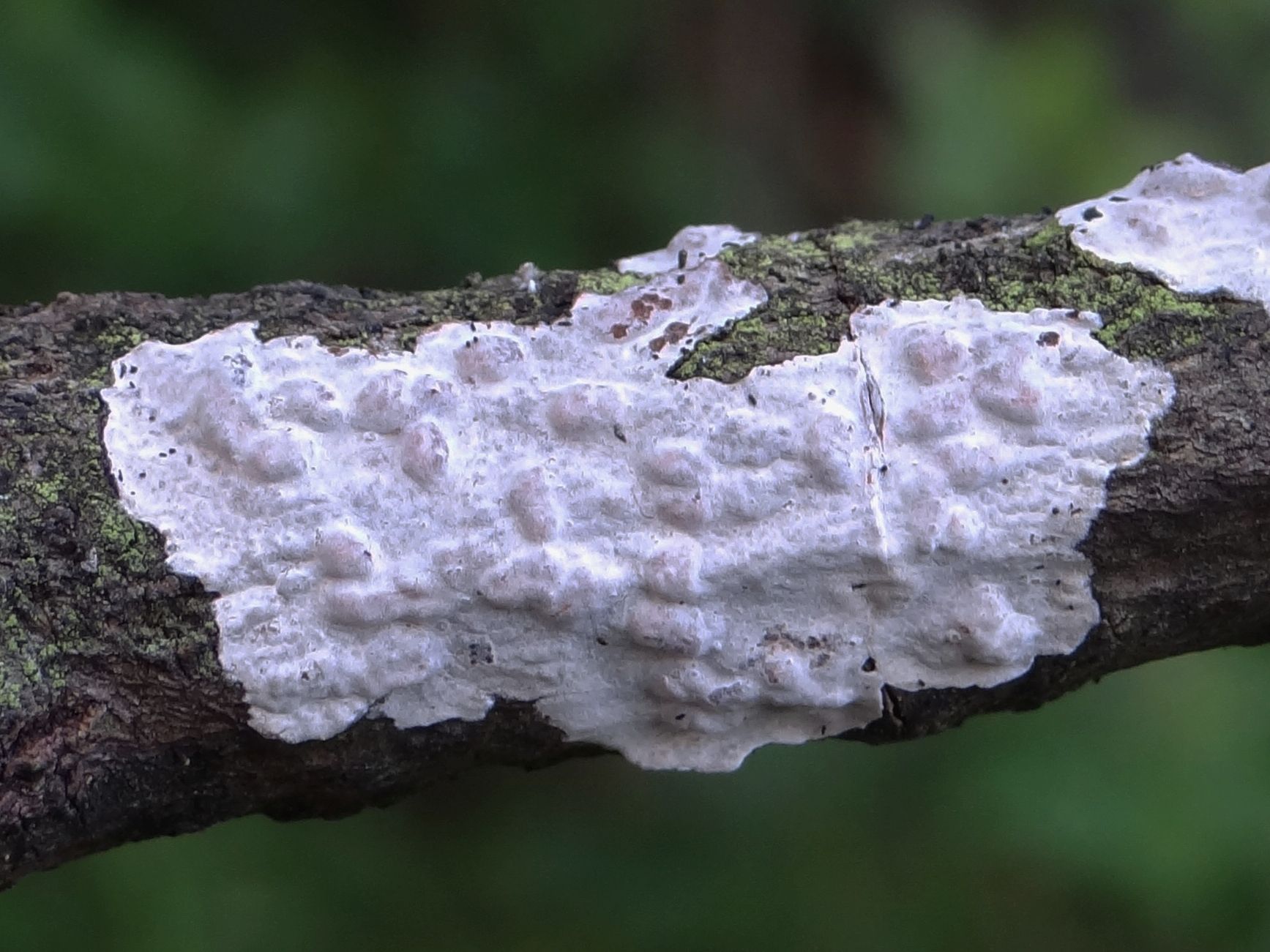
- Exidiopsis effusa

Scientific classification
- Kingdom: Fungi
- Division: Basidiomycota
- Class: Agaricomycetes
- Order: Auriculariales
- Family: Auriculariaceae
- Genus: Exidiopsis (Bref.) A.Møller (1895)

Type species
- Exidiopsis effusa (Bref. ex Sacc.) A.Møller

Synonyms
- Exidia subgen. Exidiopsis Bref. (1888)

= Exidiopsis =

Genus of fungi

Exidiopsis is a genus of fungi in the family Auriculariaceae. The genus has a widespread distribution and contains around 30 species. One species, Exidiopsis effusa, is responsible for the formation of hair ice on dead wood.

== Species ==
- Exidiopsis albopruinata
- Exidiopsis alliciens
- Exidiopsis badia
- Exidiopsis banlaensis
- Exidiopsis calcea
- Exidiopsis cartilaginea
- Exidiopsis citrina
- Exidiopsis diversa
- Exidiopsis effusa
- Exidiopsis endoramifera
- Exidiopsis galzinii
- Exidiopsis griseobrunnea
- Exidiopsis gypsea
- Exidiopsis jianfengensis
- Exidiopsis leucophaea
- Exidiopsis macroacantha
- Exidiopsis molybdea
- Exidiopsis mucedinea
- Exidiopsis novae-zelandiae
- Exidiopsis opalea
- Exidiopsis pallida
- Exidiopsis paniculata
- Exidiopsis pulverea
- Exidiopsis punicea
- Exidiopsis rufula
- Exidiopsis scutelliformis
- Exidiopsis sublivida
- Exidiopsis succinea
- Exidiopsis tawa
- Exidiopsis tenuis
- Exidiopsis tremellispora
