= Pacific Spirit Regional Park =

Park in the city of Vancouver, British Columbia

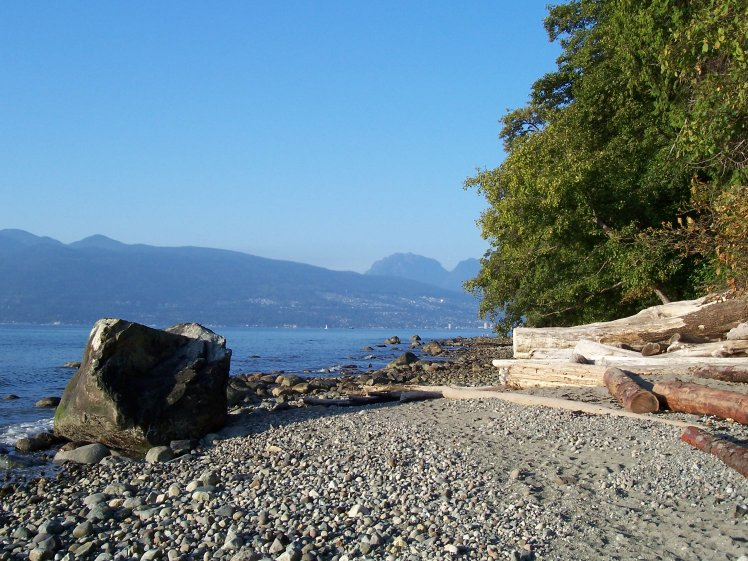
- Acadia Beach
- Interactive map of Pacific Spirit Regional Park
- Type: Regional park
- Location: Electoral Area A, Metro Vancouver
- Nearest city: Vancouver, British Columbia, Canada
- Coordinates: 49.25°N 123.21°W
- Area: 874 hectares (2,160 acres)
- Established: 1989
- Operator: Metro Vancouver Regional District
- Website: metrovancouver.org/services/regional-parks/park/pacific-spirit-regional-park

Pacific Spirit Regional Park is a 860-hectare (2,100-acre) park located in Point Grey to the west of the city of Vancouver, British Columbia. Located in Electoral Area A, it surrounds the University of British Columbia Vancouver campus on the shores of Georgia Strait in the Pacific Ocean. Most of Pacific Spirit Park is in the University Endowment Lands, though a portion of the shoreline around Wreck Beach is not part of any organized local government.

Pacific Spirit Park was formerly owned by the British Columbia government, which in 1989 transferred the lands to Metro Vancouver to operate as a park.

The park contains over 55 km of walking/hiking trails, 34 km of which are designated multi-use and available for cycling and horseback riding as well. There is a Park Centre which is located on W 16th Avenue.

In 1975, BC Parks established ninety hectares of Pacific Spirit Regional Park as the UBC Endowment Lands Ecological Reserve. This area is designated for forest research, and is not open to the public.
