= Exidiopsis macroacantha =

Scientific classification
- Kingdom: Fungi
- Division: Basidiomycota
- Class: Agaricomycetes
- Order: Auriculariales
- Family: Auriculariaceae
- Genus: Exidiopsis
- Species: E. macroacantha

Binomial name
- Exidiopsis macroacantha K.Wells (1969)

Species of fungus

Exidiopsis macroacantha is a species of fungus in the family Auriculariaceae. Originally found in São Paulo State, Brazil, where it was growing on rotting wood, it was described as new to science in 1969 by U.S. mycologist Kenneth Wells. It has also been recorded in Costa Rica. The specific epithet macroacantha, derived from the Greek words macro ("long") and acantha ("spine"), refers to the characteristically long and thick-walled cystidia.
