= Meslilloet Mountain =

Mountain in British Columbia, Canada

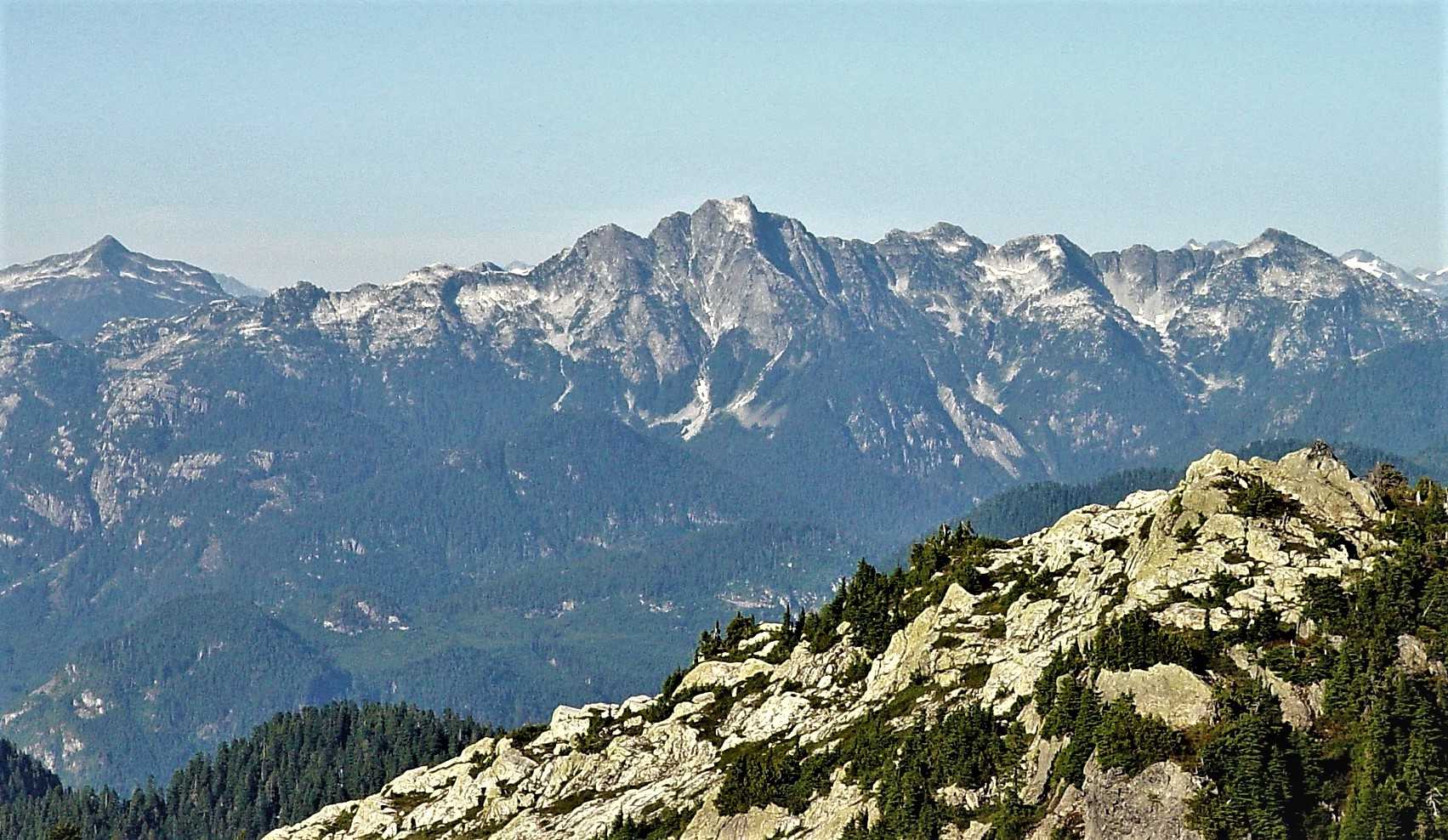
- South aspect

Highest point
- Elevation: 1,990 m (6,529 ft)
- Prominence: 685 m (2,247 ft)
- Parent peak: Pinecone Peak (2,027 m)
- Isolation: 8.36 km (5.19 mi)
- Listing: Mountains of British Columbia
- Coordinates: 49°34′18″N 122°49′38″W

Geography
- Location within British Columbia Location within Canada
- Interactive map of Meslilloet Mountain
- Country: Canada
- Province: British Columbia
- District: New Westminster Land District
- Protected area: Pinecone Burke Provincial Park
- Parent range: Coquitlam Ranges; Coast Mountains
- Topo map: NTS 92G10 Pitt River

Meslilloet Mountain is a 1,990-metre (6,529-foot) summit located in British Columbia, Canada.

== Description ==
Meslilloet Mountain is situated 35 km (22 mi) northeast of Vancouver in the Coquitlam Ranges of the Coast Mountains. It is the highest point in the Coquitlam Ranges, and second-highest point in Pinecone Burke Provincial Park. It is set east of the confluence of Meslilloet Creek and Indian River, with precipitation runoff and glacial meltwater from the mountain draining into Meslilloet and Hixon creeks, which are both tributaries of the Indian River. Meslilloet Mountain is more notable for its steep rise above local terrain than for its absolute elevation as topographic relief is significant with the summit rising over 1,100 meters (3,609 ft) above Anne Lake in less than 2 km (1.2 mi). The glacier on Meslilloet Mountain is the closest glacier to Vancouver. The mountain's toponym was officially adopted December 12, 1939, by the Geographical Names Board of Canada.

== Climate ==
Based on the Köppen climate classification, Meslilloet Mountain is located in the marine west coast climate zone of western North America. Most weather fronts originate in the Pacific Ocean, and travel east toward the Coast Mountains where they are forced upward by the range (Orographic lift), causing them to drop their moisture in the form of rain or snowfall. As a result, the Coast Mountains experience high precipitation, especially during the winter months in the form of snowfall. Winter temperatures can drop below −20 °C with wind chill factors below −30 °C. This climate supports a glacier on the peak's north slope. The months July through September offer the most favorable weather for climbing Meslilloet Mountain.

== See also ==
- Geography of British Columbia
- Geology of British Columbia
