= University Endowment Lands =

- Unincorporated area
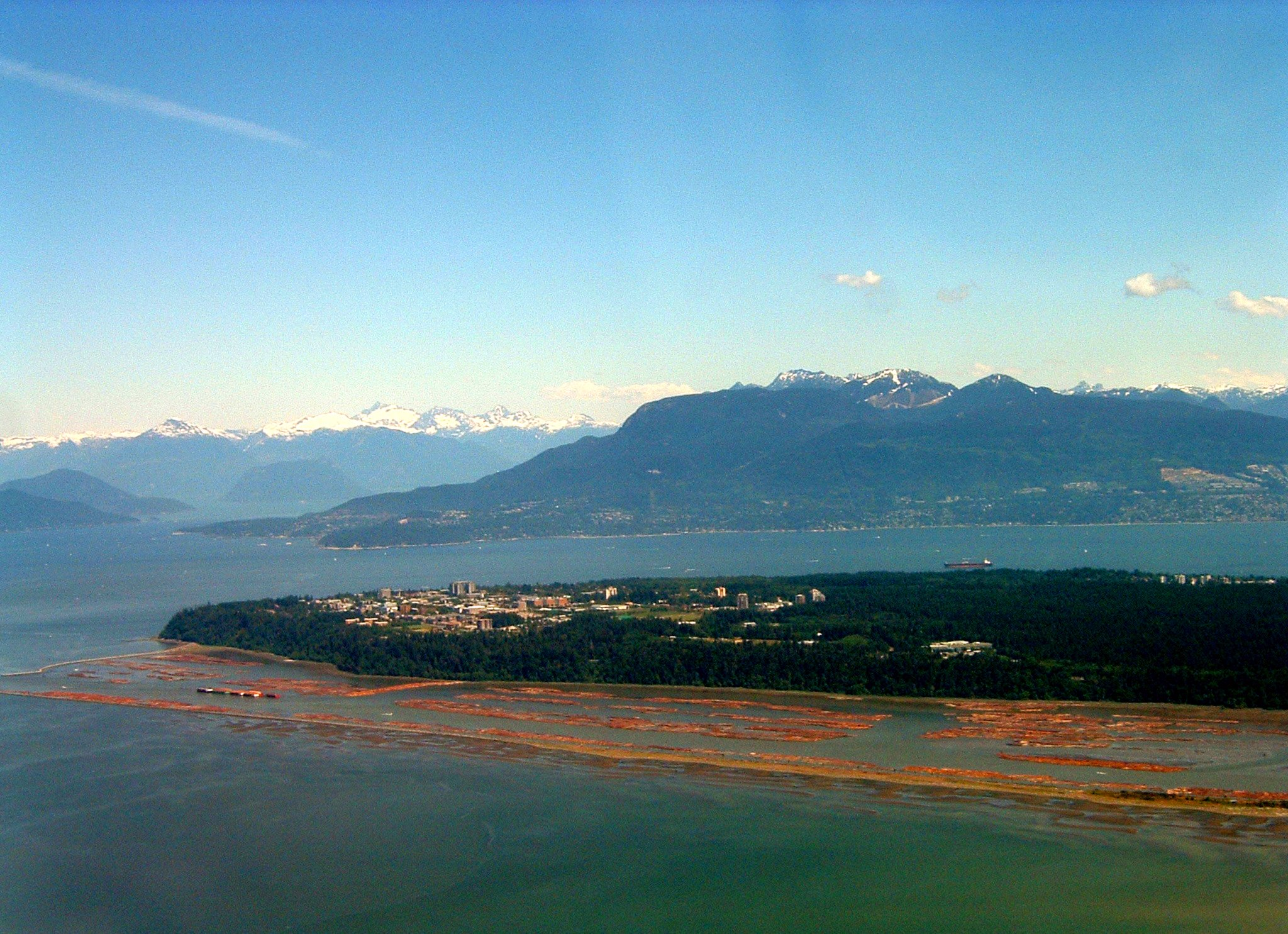

- Location of the University Endowment Lands in Metro Vancouver
- Coordinates: 49.258°N 123.228°W
- Country: Canada
- Province: British Columbia
- Regional district: Metro Vancouver
- Electoral Area: Electoral Area A

Government
  - Minister of Municipal Affairs: Christine Boyle
  - MP: Wade Grant
  - MLA: David Eby
  - MVRD Director: Jen McCutcheon

Area
  - Total: 14.13 km^{2} (5.46 sq mi)
- Elevation: 80 m (260 ft)

Population (2021)
  - Total: 3,193
  - Density: 225.97/km^{2} (585.3/sq mi)
- Time zone: UTC−07:00 (BC Pacific Time)
- Postal code span: V6S, V6T
- Area codes: 604, 778
- Website: University Endowment Lands

The University Endowment Lands (UEL) is an unincorporated area in Metro Vancouver, British Columbia, Canada. It lies west of Vancouver and east of the University of British Columbia's Point Grey campus lands. Most of the University Endowment Lands' land area is occupied by Pacific Spirit Regional Park, a large nature park operated by Metro Vancouver, with the remainder consisting of residential and commercial developments.

As an unincorporated area, the University Endowment Lands is not part of any municipality. Instead, it is directly administered by the provincial government in the name of the Minister of Municipal Affairs under the terms of the University Endowment Land Act. For the purposes of representation on the Metro Vancouver Board of Directors, the UEL is part of Electoral Area A. In a 1995 referendum, UEL residents voted against establishing a municipal governing body.

== Geography ==
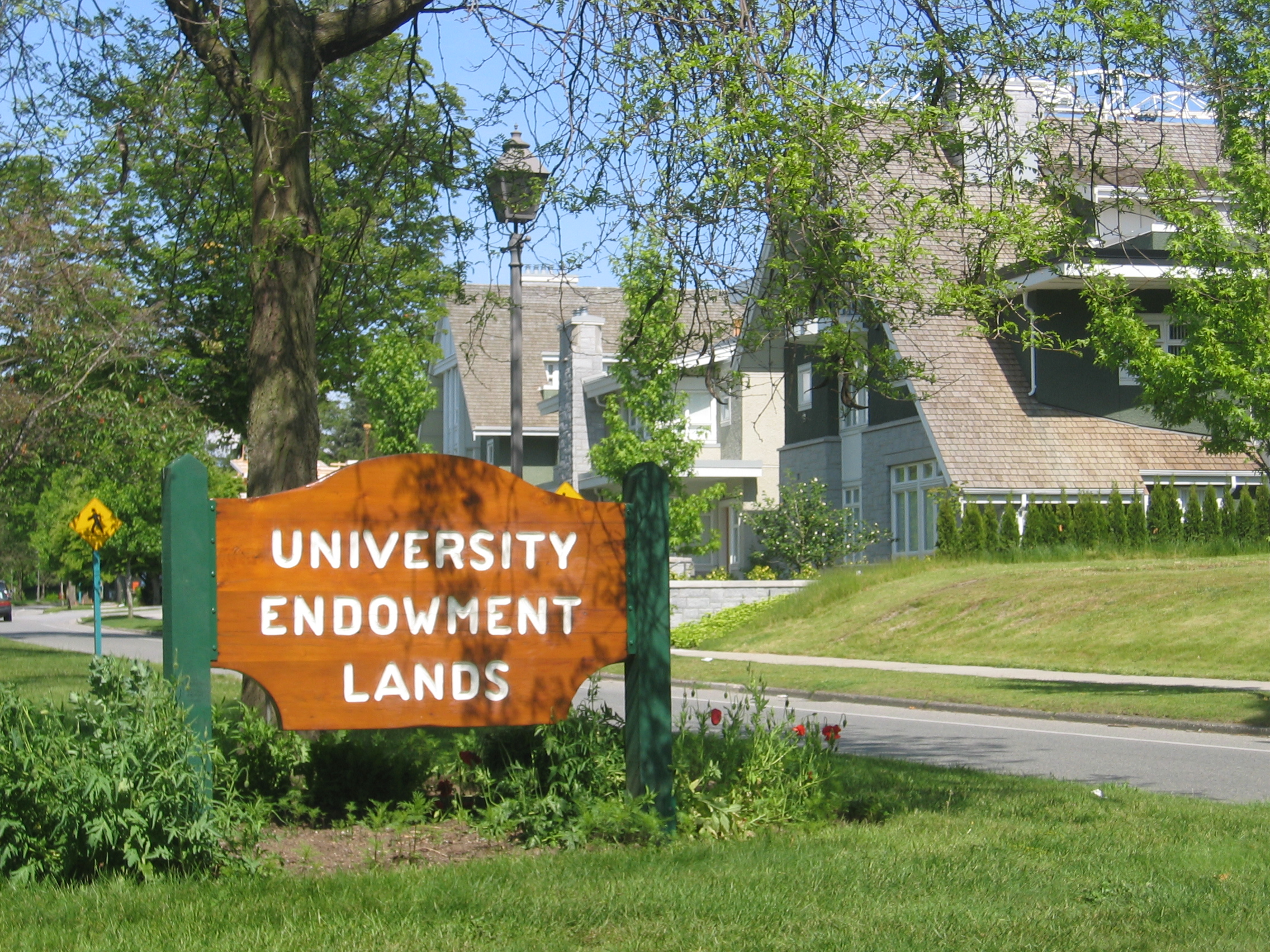
A University Endowment Lands welcome sign on Northwest Marine Drive

The University Endowment Lands are located immediately west of the City of Vancouver on the Burrard Peninsula. Statistics Canada reports a total land area of 14.13 square kilometres (5.46 sq mi). Most of the UEL is made up of Pacific Spirit Regional Park, a mostly forested land that was originally set aside for development which never materialized. Located on Point Grey, the UEL also boasts tall cliffs near the water, with steep drops of approximately 70 metres (230 ft) down to the beaches below.

=== Climate ===
Because the UEL is close to seaside cliffs and the Strait of Georgia, above-average winds are common. Most of the winds come from the Strait itself, Howe Sound and English Bay.

Snowfalls are also more common than many parts of the City of Vancouver because of the area's higher altitude and the lack of an urban heat island due to less terrestrial development.

The UEL has higher humidity compared to other parts of Greater Vancouver because it is surrounded on three sides by water. Fog is common in the winter months, especially in areas near Pacific Spirit Park and the water.

Climate data for UBC, Vancouver
Month	Jan	Feb	Mar	Apr	May	Jun	Jul	Aug	Sep	Oct	Nov	Dec	Year
Record high °C (°F)	16.4 (61.5)	17.9 (64.2)	19.5 (67.1)	25.0 (77.0)	31.0 (87.8)	30.0 (86.0)	31.1 (88.0)	32.8 (91.0)	30.0 (86.0)	25.0 (77.0)	17.5 (63.5)	14.6 (58.3)	32.8 (91.0)
Mean daily maximum °C (°F)	6.0 (42.8)	7.6 (45.7)	9.5 (49.1)	12.3 (54.1)	15.7 (60.3)	18.0 (64.4)	20.4 (68.7)	20.5 (68.9)	17.9 (64.2)	13.1 (55.6)	8.5 (47.3)	6.1 (43.0)	13.0 (55.4)
Daily mean °C (°F)	3.6 (38.5)	4.9 (40.8)	6.6 (43.9)	9.1 (48.4)	12.3 (54.1)	14.7 (58.5)	16.9 (62.4)	17.1 (62.8)	14.5 (58.1)	10.3 (50.5)	6.1 (43.0)	3.8 (38.8)	10.0 (50.0)
Mean daily minimum °C (°F)	1.2 (34.2)	2.3 (36.1)	3.6 (38.5)	5.7 (42.3)	8.8 (47.8)	11.4 (52.5)	13.2 (55.8)	13.5 (56.3)	11.1 (52.0)	7.5 (45.5)	3.7 (38.7)	1.5 (34.7)	7.0 (44.6)
Record low °C (°F)	−13.9 (7.0)	−12.5 (9.5)	−10.6 (12.9)	−0.6 (30.9)	1.7 (35.1)	2.6 (36.7)	7.3 (45.1)	6.1 (43.0)	0.6 (33.1)	−4.1 (24.6)	−12.5 (9.5)	−18.3 (−0.9)	−18.3 (−0.9)
Average precipitation mm (inches)	162.7 (6.41)	137.5 (5.41)	121.9 (4.80)	89.6 (3.53)	68.3 (2.69)	55.5 (2.19)	39.3 (1.55)	48.1 (1.89)	58.6 (2.31)	113.6 (4.47)	198.9 (7.83)	183.5 (7.22)	1,277.4 (50.29)
Source: Environment Canada

== History ==
The creation of the University Endowment Lands was first proposed after the passing of the University Endowment Act of 1907, in which the British Columbia provincial government agreed to set aside two million acres (8,000 km^{2}) of British Columbia Crown land to be sold or leased to fund the creation of a university. This land was to be in the Cariboo region of the province's Interior, and consisted of mostly agricultural land. This idea was changed in 1911 when the provincial government passed the University Site Act, which set aside 175 acres (71 ha) in Point Grey for the university. This is where the UEL is located today.

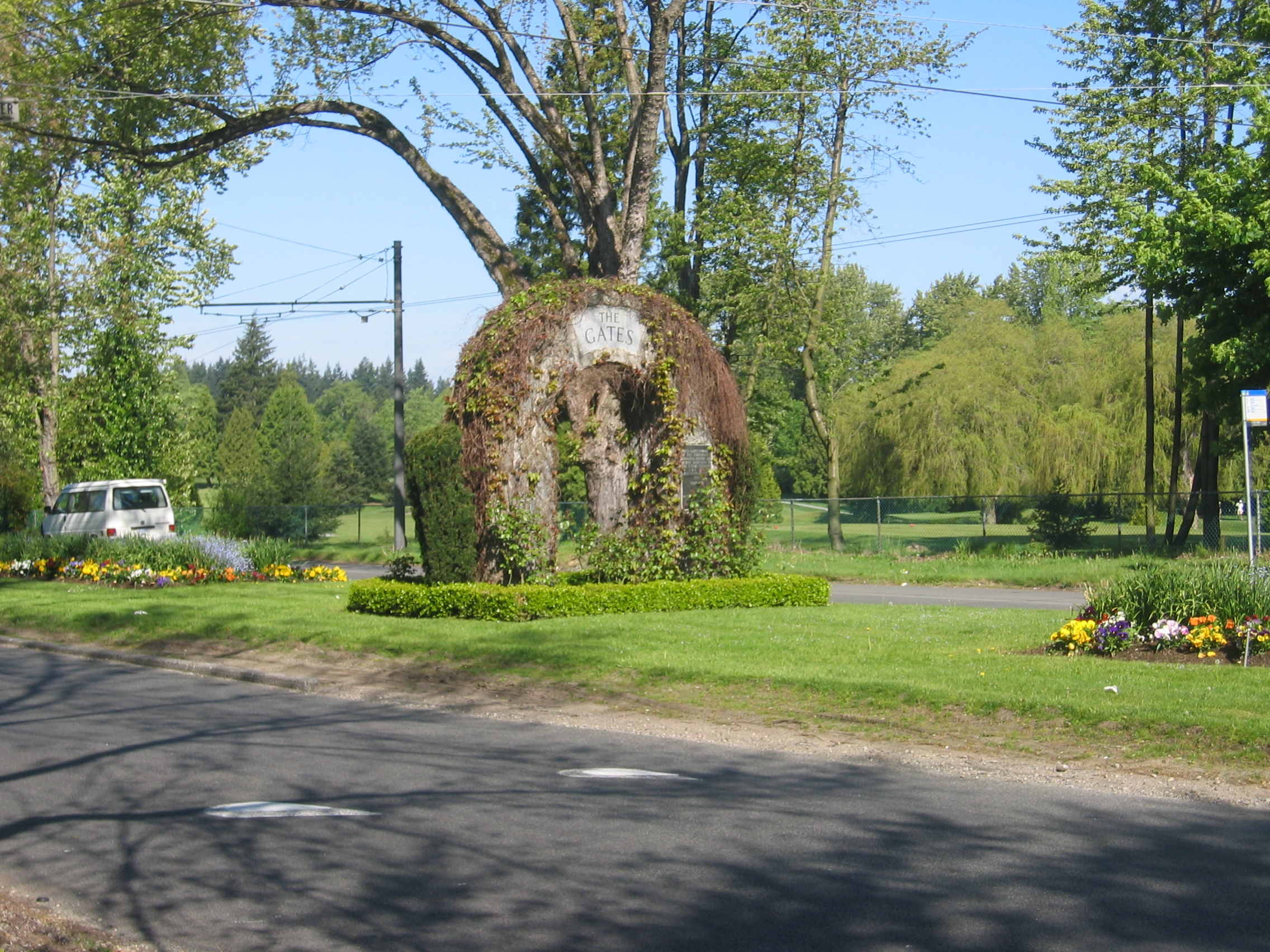
"The Gates" monument at University Boulevard and Blanca Street, the intersection that straddles the border between Vancouver and the UEL

By 1920, it was realized that the Cariboo land did not have a high enough market value to generate the income needed for the university, so that idea was abandoned. This led to the British Columbia University Loan Act, which allowed the Lieutenant-Governor to sell 3,000 acres (12 km^{2}) of Crown land on Point Grey for residential development. The money from the auction was put in the University Endowment Account for the university.

However, a lot of the development that was planned was halted due to economic hardships stemming from the Great Depression. The university could not afford to prepare the land for development or to clear the forest land for development. In the 1930s, the university returned control of the land to the government. By the mid-1950s, over half of the undeveloped land in the UEL remained undeveloped due to the Depression and war shortages in the 1940s.

There have been many attempts to develop this land, which was then opposed by environmentally aware residents in the area. In 1988, the creation of Pacific Spirit Park was announced by the provincial Premier Bill Vander Zalm. The park currently makes up of over half of the UEL, acting as a greenbelt between the developed areas and the City of Vancouver. Development, in large part, is very limited; for any proposed developments in the UEL by the Greater Vancouver Regional District or the University of British Columbia, the following groups must be consulted beforehand: university students, university staff, university faculty, environmental groups, businesses, residents and the general public.

== Demographics ==
In the 2021 census the University Endowment Lands had an official permanent population of 3,193.

== Government and politics ==
As an unincorporated area, the University Endowment Lands has no mayor or municipal government. The area is instead organized under the University Endowment Land Act, which grants the Minister of Municipal Affairs the authority to make by-laws and to regulate development in the area. The minister's authority has been delegated to the UEL Administration, a division of the Ministry of Municipal Affairs headed by the UEL Manager, an appointee of the minister. The incumbent Minister of Municipal Affairs is Christine Boyle and the current UEL Manager is William Emo. The UEL Administration is responsible for land-use planning, by-law enforcement, local streets, utilities, parks and recreation, and garbage collection. While it is geographically within the UEL, Pacific Spirit Park is owned by Metro Vancouver, which autonomously operates the park as its own entity.

For the purposes of representation on the Metro Vancouver Board of Directors, the UEL is part of Electoral Area A along with UBC Vancouver, Barnston Island, remote parts of the North Shore, and certain islands in the Howe Sound and Indian Arm. The current Electoral Area A director is Jen McCutcheon. Metro Vancouver handles emergency planning inside the UEL and shapes the development of the area through its regional growth strategy.

For provincial elections, the UEL falls under the Vancouver-Point Grey electoral riding. Since 2013, the Member of the Legislative Assembly has been David Eby, who became premier of British Columbia in 2022. From 2011 to 2013, the riding was represented by then-premier Christy Clark.

For federal elections, the UEL is in the Vancouver Quadra electoral riding. The seat is held by Wade Grant.

=== Reform ===
In 1995, a referendum was put to voters in the University Endowment Lands and in the Hampton Place neighbourhood of UBC Vancouver to combine the two communities as a new municipality. This effort was rejected with 599 of 917 votes (65%) against on a turnout of 33 percent. In the same year, Vancouver City Council voted not to pursue the annexation of the University Endowment Lands, though it welcomed future amalgamation with the UEL if the province or local residents requested this measure and compensated the city for the cost.

In 2022, the Ministry of Municipal Affairs published the final report of its UEL Governance Study, which outlined options for the future of the University Endowment Lands' government. The possible scenarios studied were continuing the status quo of provincial administration, transferring most local services to the Metro Vancouver Regional District as a local service area, incorporating the UEL as a standalone municipality, and annexing the UEL to the City of Vancouver. Since the publication of the study, the province has not announced any planned changes to the UEL's governance.

== Neighbourhoods ==
The UEL is made up of four neighbourhood areas:

- Area A is bordered by Chancellor Boulevard, Acadia Road, University Boulevard and Wesbrook Mall.
- Area B lies between Chancellor Boulevard and NW Marine Drive.
- Area C is between Blanca Street, West 6th Avenue, Tasmania Crescent and College Highroad.
- Area D is bordered by University Boulevard, Agronomy and Toronto Roads, Wesbrook Mall and includes Block F.

== Transportation ==
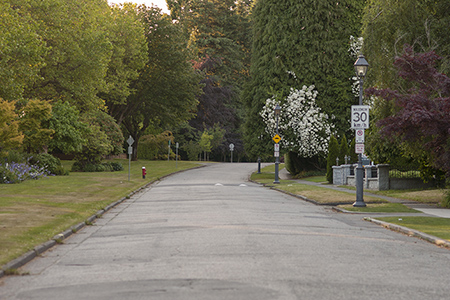
Western Parkway is a local street in the University Endowment Lands

As Pacific Spirit Regional Park covers most of the University Endowment Lands, there are only five roads that connect the UEL to Vancouver: Northwest Marine Drive, Chancellor Boulevard, University Boulevard, 16th Avenue and Southwest Marine Drive. These roads are owned and maintained by the Ministry of Transportation and Transit as part of the provincial highway system. In addition, the UEL Administration maintains a number of local streets in the residential communities.

By virtue of its location between Vancouver and the UBC campus, all TransLink to UBC Exchange pass through the University Endowment Lands. Bus routes serving the UEL include the 99 B-Line and the R4 RapidBus, as well as the 4, 14, 25, 33, 44, 49, 68 and 84 routes. Limited service is provided by the N17 NightBus in late evenings and by the 9 at peak hours during the school year. An extension of the SkyTrain's Millennium Line from Arbutus Station to UBC is part of long-term plans from TransLink and the provincial government but remains unfunded. This line will travel through the University Endowment Lands, but no stations are currently planned within its borders.

== Economy ==
The developed portion of the University Endowment Lands is largely residential, with some commercial uses in the area around University Village and University Marketplace. The Village and Marketplace, located next to each other near the intersection of University Boulevard and Allison Road, are home to a food court, several restaurants, some shops, some medical clinics and some services. Due to their proximity to the UBC campus, they are often frequented by students.

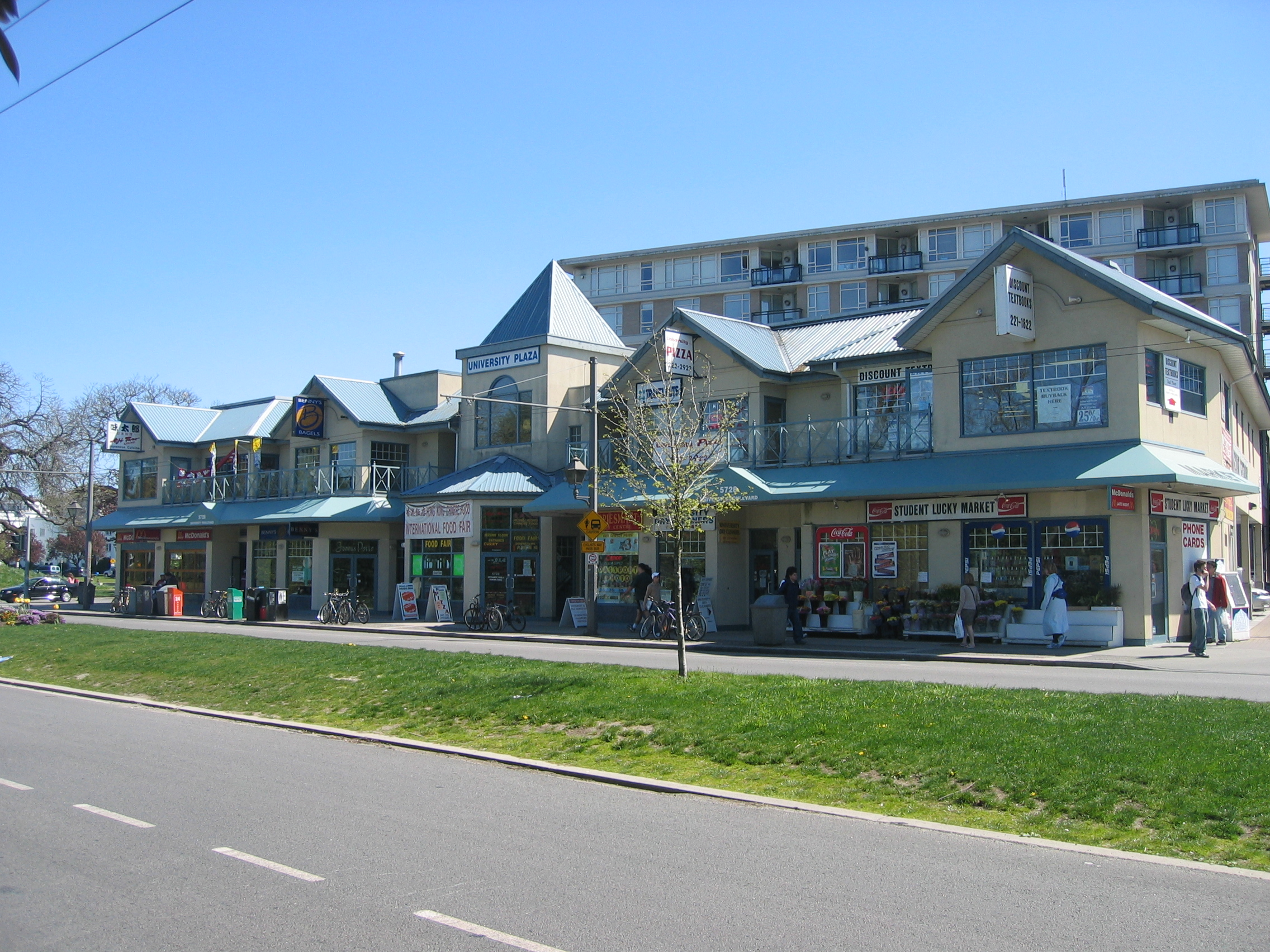
The University Village, as seen from University Boulevard

The eastern end of the UEL is home to the University Golf Club, which is one of the original developments in the non-campus portions of the UEL.

=== Commercial centres ===
==== University Village ====
The University Village is the first commercial structure built in the UEL. Its main level mostly includes a convenience store, a McDonald's restaurant, a photocopying store and a florist.

The second level is home to a Japanese restaurant, a salon, a pizza parlour and a discount textbook store (which is in direct competition with UBC Bookstore, located on campus).

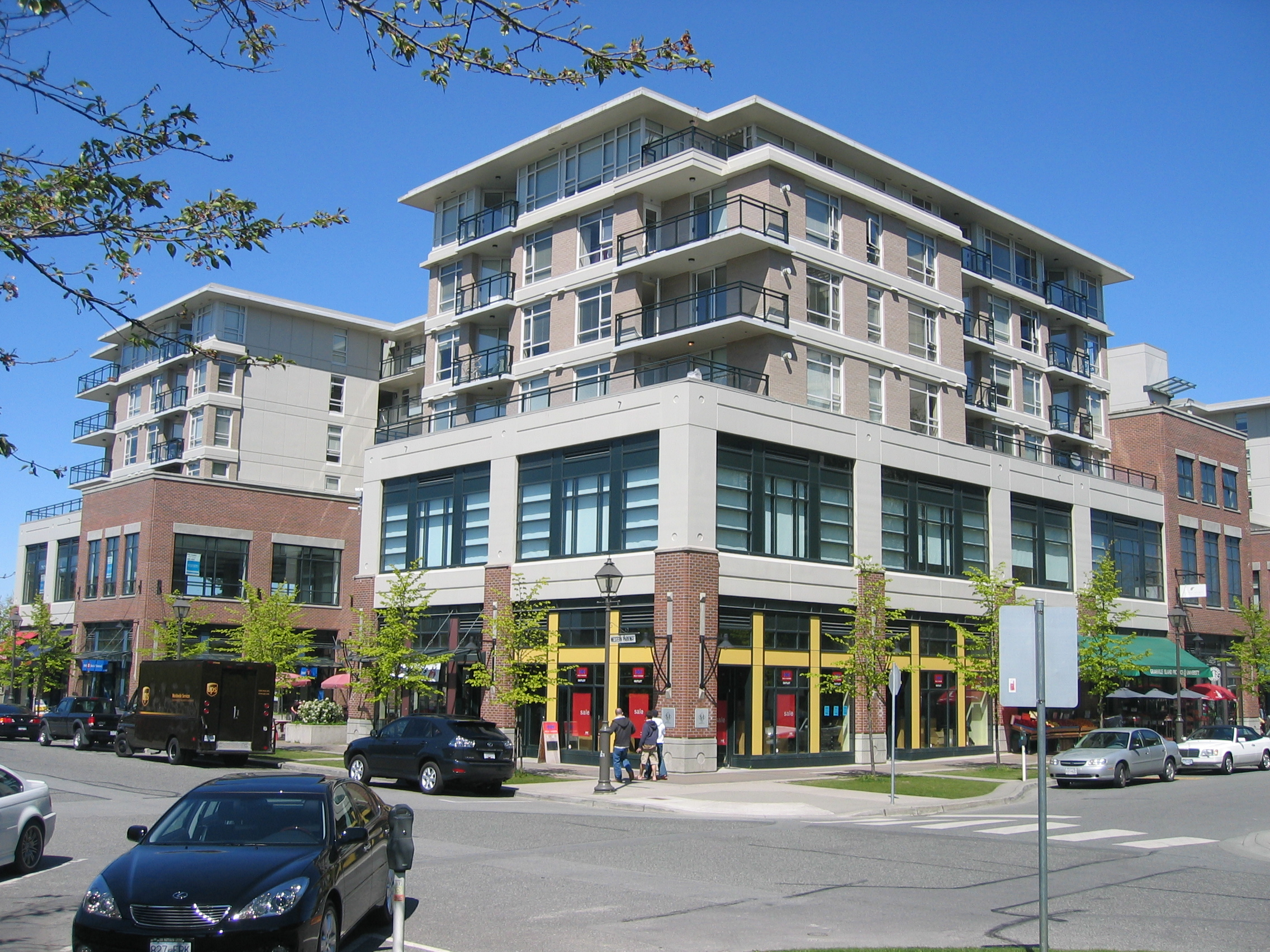
The University Marketplace, as seen from Western Parkway

The basement level is entirely dedicated to a multicultural-themed food court, including Chinese, Japanese, Indian, Middle Eastern, etc.

==== University Marketplace ====
The University Marketplace is a mixed commercial-residential structure completed around the late 1990s to the early 2000s. The main floor is home to Rogers Wireless, Staples Business Depot, Starbucks, several restaurants, some cafes and others.

The second floor of the Marketplace contains mostly offices and medical clinics. Some professors from UBC (especially those in the medical field) have offices located there, likely due to the proximity of the science buildings and UBC Hospital.

The upper floors of the Marketplace contain mostly residential apartment housing.

== Education ==
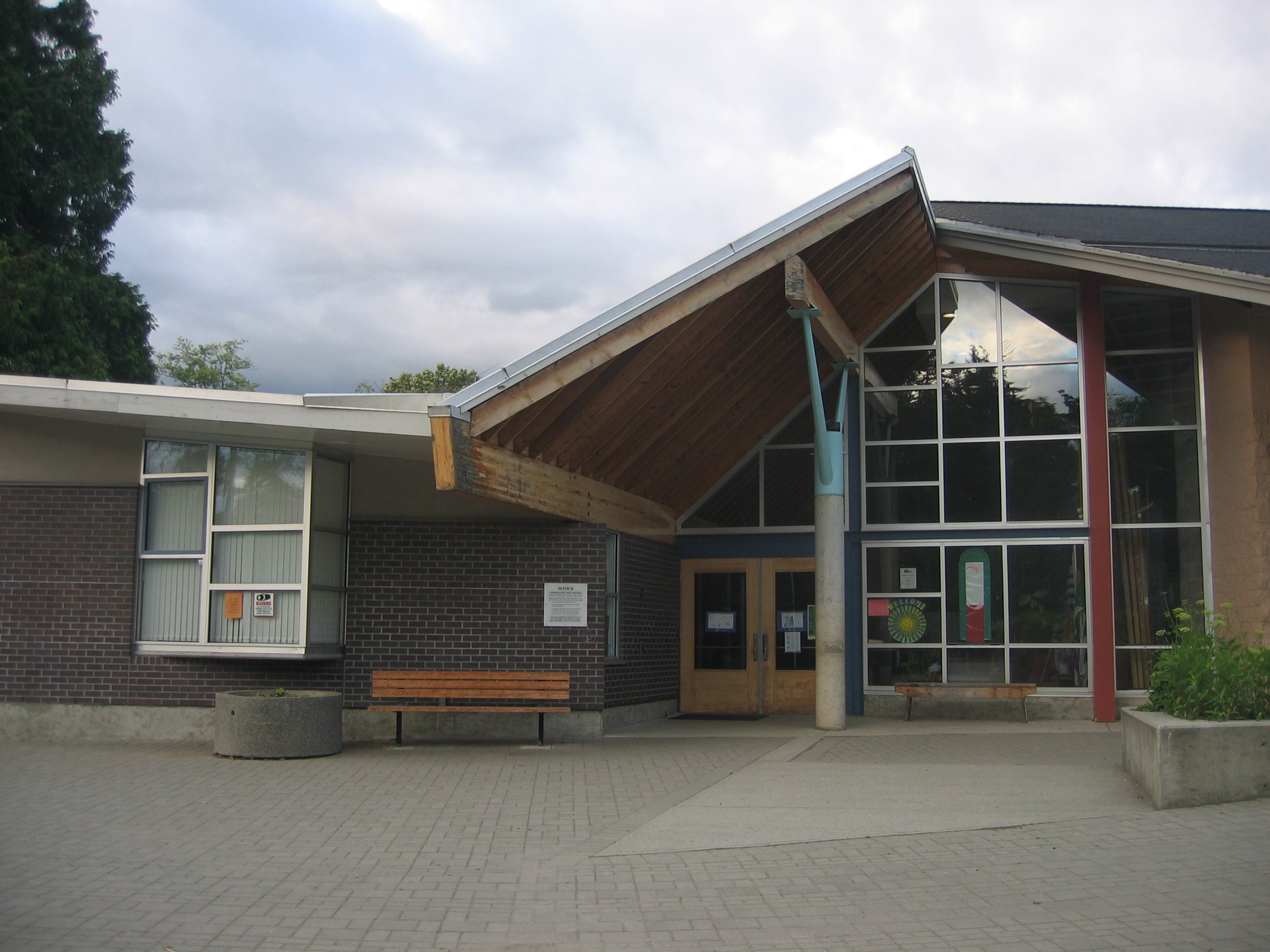
University Hill Elementary School is a school in the University Endowment Lands

The University Endowment Lands is part of the Vancouver School Board (School District 39) and participates in elections for its trustees. While students in the UEL can enrol in a number of specialized out-of-catchment schools operated by the Vancouver School Board, the in-catchment elementary schools are University Hill Elementary and Norma Rose Point Elementary. The in-catchment secondary school is University Hill Secondary School, which is located in the neighbouring jurisdiction of UBC Vancouver.

Regent College, an interdenominational evangelical Christian College of Christian studies affiliated with UBC, is located in the UEL.

== Emergency services ==
Policing in the University Endowment Lands is the responsibility of the Royal Canadian Mounted Police "E" Division's University detachment, which is also the police of jurisdiction in the neighbouring UBC Vancouver. Through a service agreement with the City of Vancouver, Vancouver Fire and Rescue Services provides firefighting services to the University Endowment Lands through its fire hall at 2992 Wesbrook Mall in UBC Vancouver.

== See also ==
- Regent College
- University of British Columbia Vancouver
- Vancouver School of Theology
