= Mount Burke (British Columbia) =

Mountain in Canada

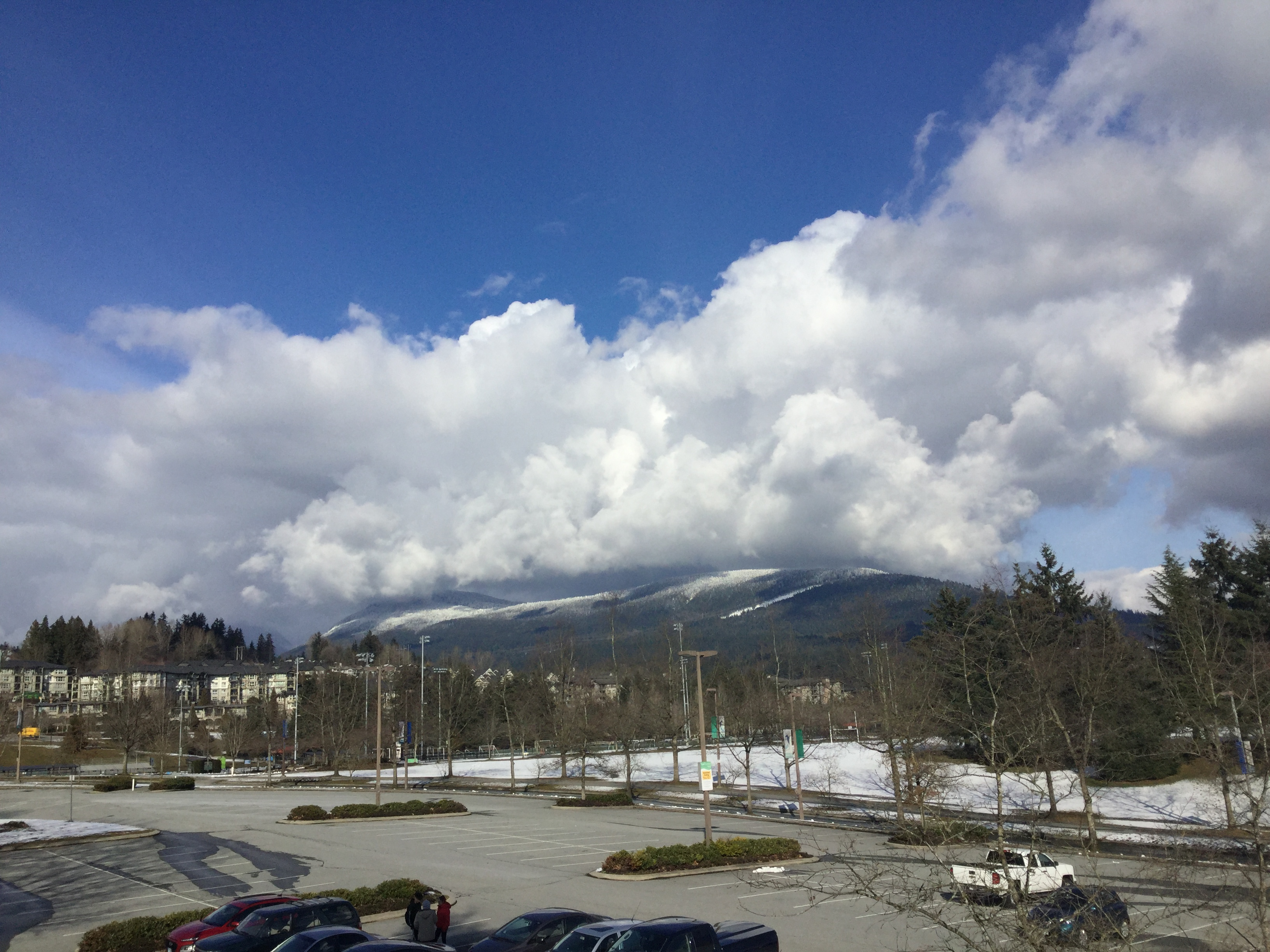
- Late winter localized thunderstorm over Burke Mountain, 2019

Highest point
- Elevation: 1,270 m (4,170 ft)
- Prominence: 173 m (568 ft)
- Coordinates: 49°18′28″N 122°42′41″W

Geography
- Location within British Columbia
- Interactive map of Mount Burke
- Location: British Columbia, Canada
- District: New Westminster Land District
- Parent range: Pacific Ranges
- Topo map: NTS 92G7 Port Coquitlam

Mount Burke, 1,270 m (4,167 ft), is a mountain located in northeast Coquitlam, British Columbia, north of Port Coquitlam on the ridge system leading to Coquitlam Mountain. Most of the mountain is part of Pinecone Burke Provincial Park. Mount Burke is found in Coquitlam near Minnekhada Regional Park.

The mountain can be accessed via Coast Meridian Road and Quarry Road, although a significant amount of hiking is necessary to reach the peak. Although people who own cabins on the mountain may use snowmobiles instead of hiking.

== History ==
Mount Burke was named for Edmund Burke by Captain George Henry Richards of HMS Plumper while surveying Burrard Inlet in 1859.

During the 1960s a ski area was opened. However, it failed to attract significant business and closed within a decade of its opening. The mountain is protected since it is a part of Pinecone Burke Provincial Park which was created in 1995.

Many people confuse Mount Burke, with the much higher and larger Burke Ridge, which is more commonly known as Burke Mountain, and in the 1920s Burke Ridge was more commonly known as Dollar Mountain, after the Canadian Robert Dollar Company, who logged the lower portions of the mountain.

== Topography ==
National Topographic System Maps

- Canadian Topographic Maps 92G/7, 2002; Edition: 6
- Canadian Topographic Maps 92-G/7, 2009; Edition: 07 version: 01
- Canadian Topographic Maps 92-G/7, 2010; Edition: 07 version: 02

These maps are free to download in the numerous formats provided from the federal government.

== Development ==
On the southern slope of Burke Mountain, there is a scheme to create several new neighbourhoods. The area is supposed to house over 30,000 people when it is completed. There are concerns about the vehicle traffic these developments may cause along with further deforestation, wildlife habitat fragmentation, increased wildlife intrusions into neighbourhoods and other environmental issues. A survey on development in an area called "Hazel Coy" conducted by the City of Coquitlam found that 60% of all respondents were opposed or somewhat opposed to the development. Additionally, 86% of respondents also had some form of concern over the environmental impact of the project.
