= Coquitlam Mountain =

Mountain in Canada

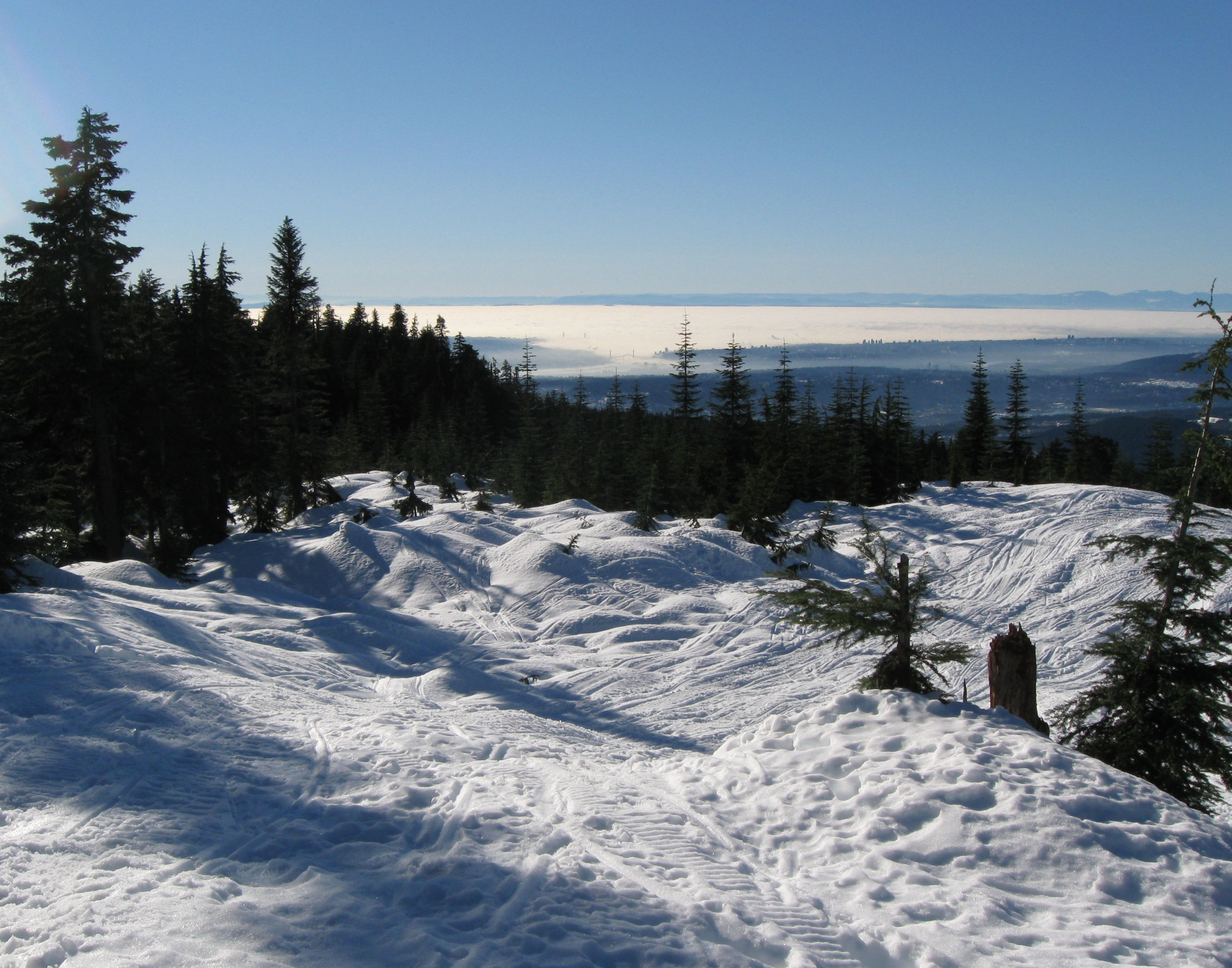
- View from Burke Mountain on the southern ridge of Coquitlam Mountain

Highest point
- Elevation: 1,583 m (5,194 ft)
- Prominence: 698 m (2,290 ft)
- Coordinates: 49°23′34″N 122°42′25″W

Geography
- Location within British Columbia
- Interactive map of Coquitlam Mountain
- Location: Coquitlam, British Columbia
- District: New Westminster Land District
- Parent range: Pacific Ranges
- Topo map: NTS 92G7 Port Coquitlam

Coquitlam Mountain is a mountain located in northeast Coquitlam, British Columbia, 6.2 km (3.9 mi) east of Coquitlam Lake and 9.7 km (6.0 mi) north of Minnekhada Regional Park. The mountain is located at the head of Or Creek, completely within the Coquitlam watershed, and thus public access is forbidden by law. Mount Burke forms the southern ridge of Coquitlam Mountain.

The first recorded ascent of the mountain was in 1918 by P. James and D. Munday. The mountain's name was adopted on 3 May 1951, in association with the Coquitlam River.

== Climate ==
The peak has a subarctic climate (Dfc).

Climate data for Coquitlam Mountain Peak 1981-2010 (49.393 -122.707)
Month	Jan	Feb	Mar	Apr	May	Jun	Jul	Aug	Sep	Oct	Nov	Dec	Year
Mean daily maximum °C (°F)	−0.3 (31.5)	0.7 (33.3)	2.9 (37.2)	5.4 (41.7)	9.7 (49.5)	12.4 (54.3)	15.8 (60.4)	16.2 (61.2)	13.1 (55.6)	7.1 (44.8)	1.2 (34.2)	−1.1 (30.0)	6.9 (44.5)
Daily mean °C (°F)	−3.7 (25.3)	−3.1 (26.4)	−1.3 (29.7)	1.0 (33.8)	4.9 (40.8)	7.8 (46.0)	11.0 (51.8)	11.6 (52.9)	9.1 (48.4)	3.6 (38.5)	−1.8 (28.8)	−4.3 (24.3)	2.9 (37.2)
Mean daily minimum °C (°F)	−7.1 (19.2)	−6.9 (19.6)	−5.6 (21.9)	−3.5 (25.7)	0.1 (32.2)	3.3 (37.9)	6.2 (43.2)	7.0 (44.6)	5.0 (41.0)	0.1 (32.2)	−4.8 (23.4)	−7.6 (18.3)	−1.1 (29.9)
Average precipitation mm (inches)	730 (28.7)	499 (19.6)	544 (21.4)	399 (15.7)	329 (13.0)	228 (9.0)	169 (6.7)	163 (6.4)	259 (10.2)	634 (25.0)	881 (34.7)	607 (23.9)	5,442 (214.3)
Source: http://www.climatewna.com/
