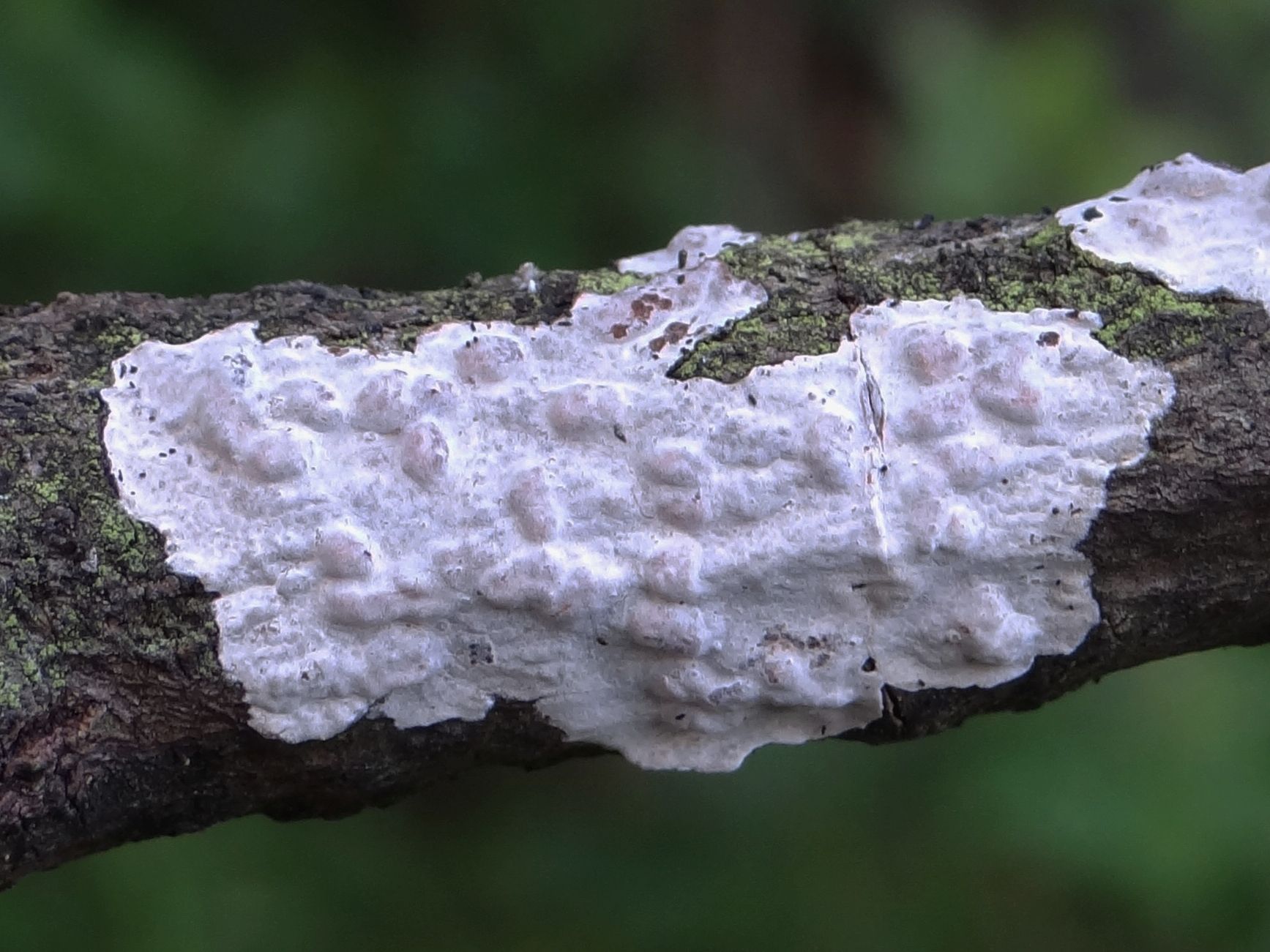
- Exidiopsis effusa on a piece of wood

Scientific classification
- Kingdom: Fungi
- Division: Basidiomycota
- Class: Agaricomycetes
- Order: Auriculariales
- Family: Auriculariaceae
- Genus: Exidiopsis
- Species: E. effusa

Binomial name
- Exidiopsis effusa Bref. (1888)

= Exidiopsis effusa =

Species of fungus

Exidiopsis effusa is a species of fungus in the family Auriculariaceae, and the type species of the genus Exidiopsis. It is associated with the formation of hair ice on dead wood.
