= Douglas Island (British Columbia) =

Island in Port Coquitlam, British Columbia

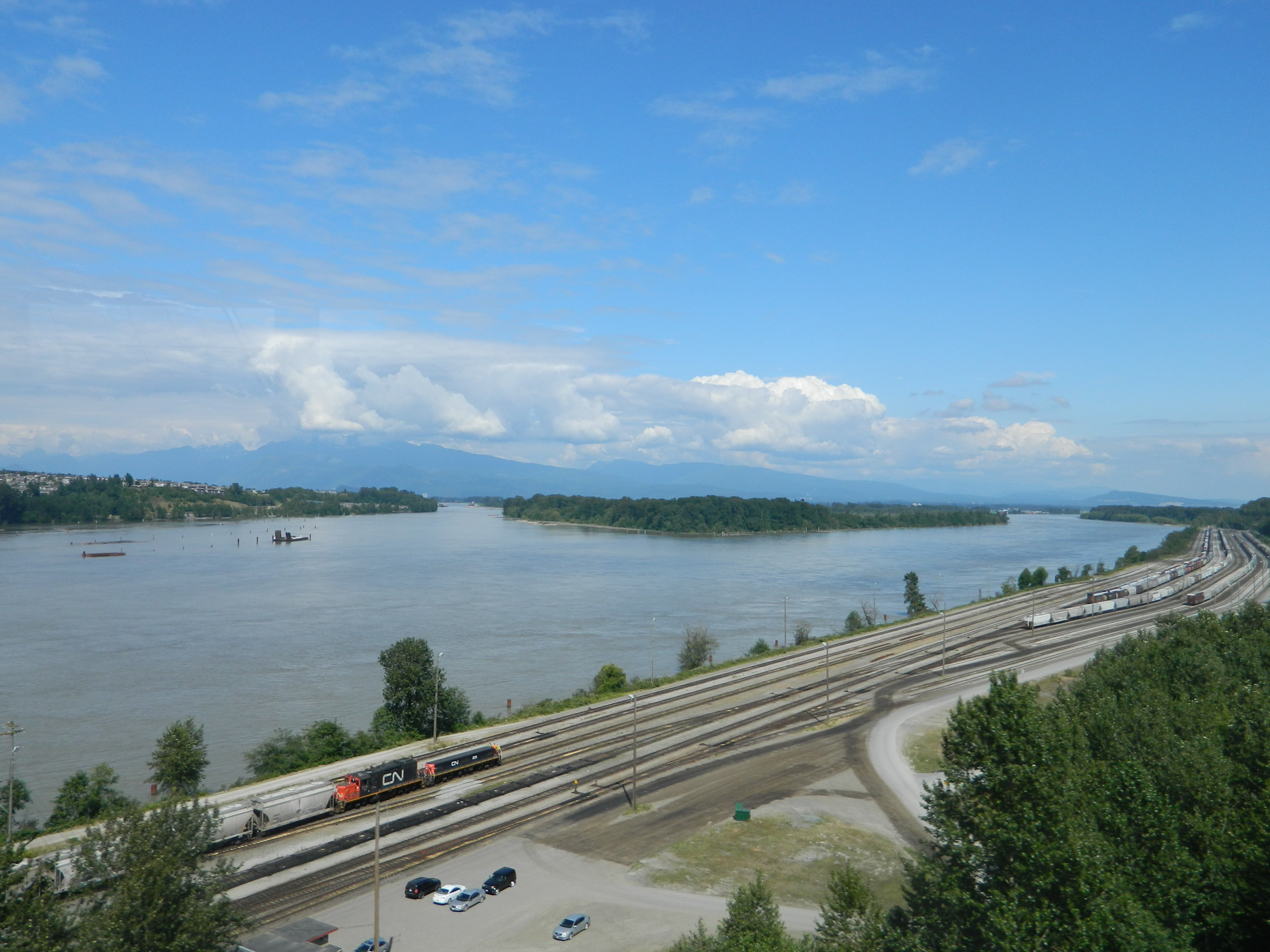

- Location within British Columbia

Geography
- Coordinates: 49°13′15″N 122°46′30″W
- Adjacent to: Fraser River

Administration
- Canada
- Province: British Columbia
- Municipality: Port Coquitlam

Demographics
- Population: none

Douglas Island is a 187-hectare (462-acre) island in British Columbia, Canada, located where the Fraser River and Pitt River meet. The island is uninhabited. The island was the property of Canadian Forest Products but the government bought it for $4.5 million. It became part of the city of Port Coquitlam on September 29, 1991.

== History and name origin ==
The British Columbia Geographical Names Information System says about this island, which is one of two with this name in the province:

Presumably named after James Douglas (1803–1877), Hudson's Bay Company Chief Factor, 1840–58; founded Victoria 1843; governor, Vancouver Island 1851–64; governor, British Columbia 1858–64; KCB, 1863. All the lots on the island were purchased by him from the Crown at auction, 6 October 1859, but Crown grant was issued to his daughter Cecilia Helmcken, wife of Dr. J.S. Helmcken.

== See also ==
- Richmond, British Columbia
- Sea Island, British Columbia
- Iona Island (British Columbia)
- Mitchell Island
- Barnston Island
