= Hair ice =

Hairlike ice that forms on dead wood

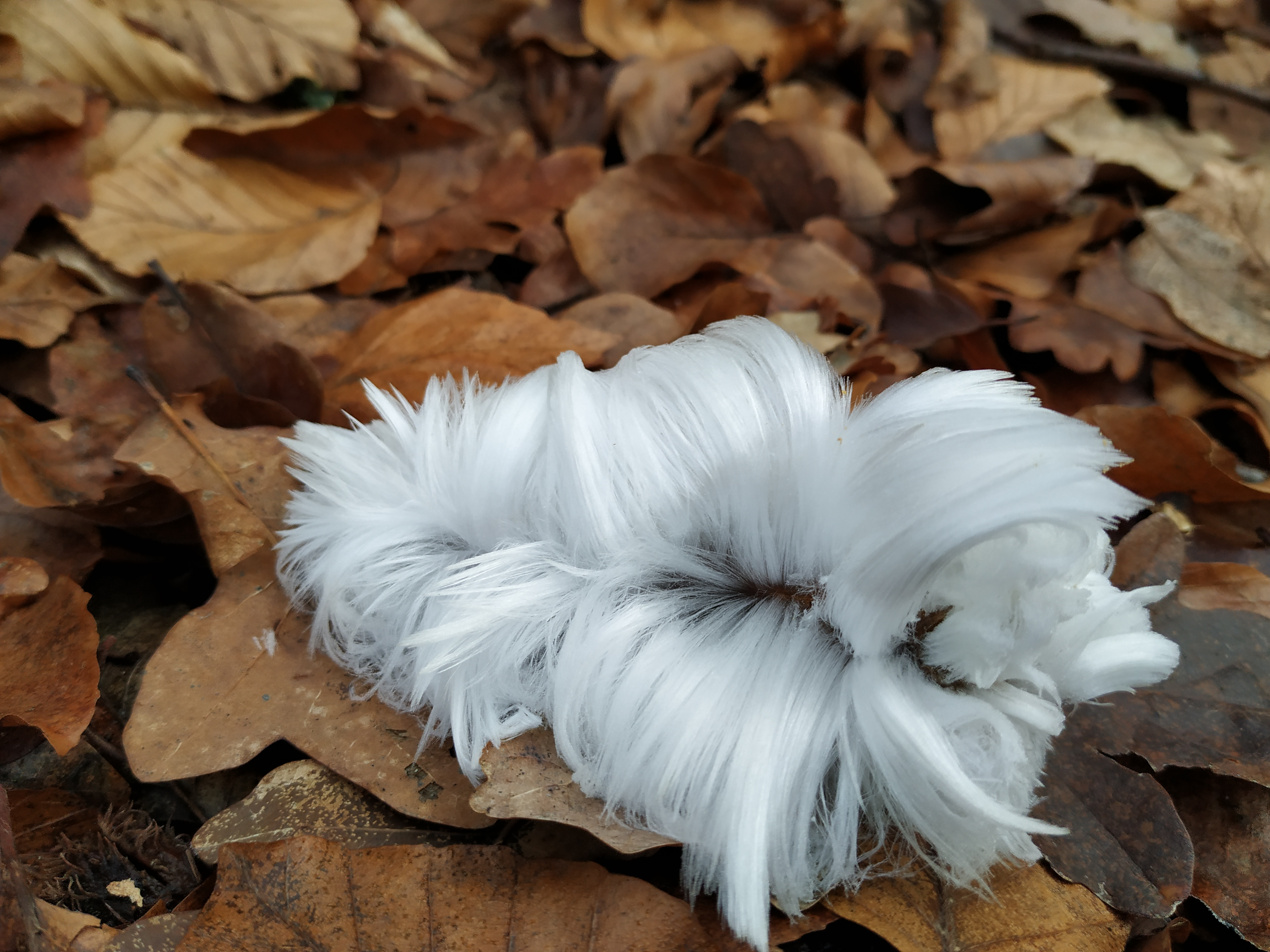
Hair ice growing on wood on the forest floor

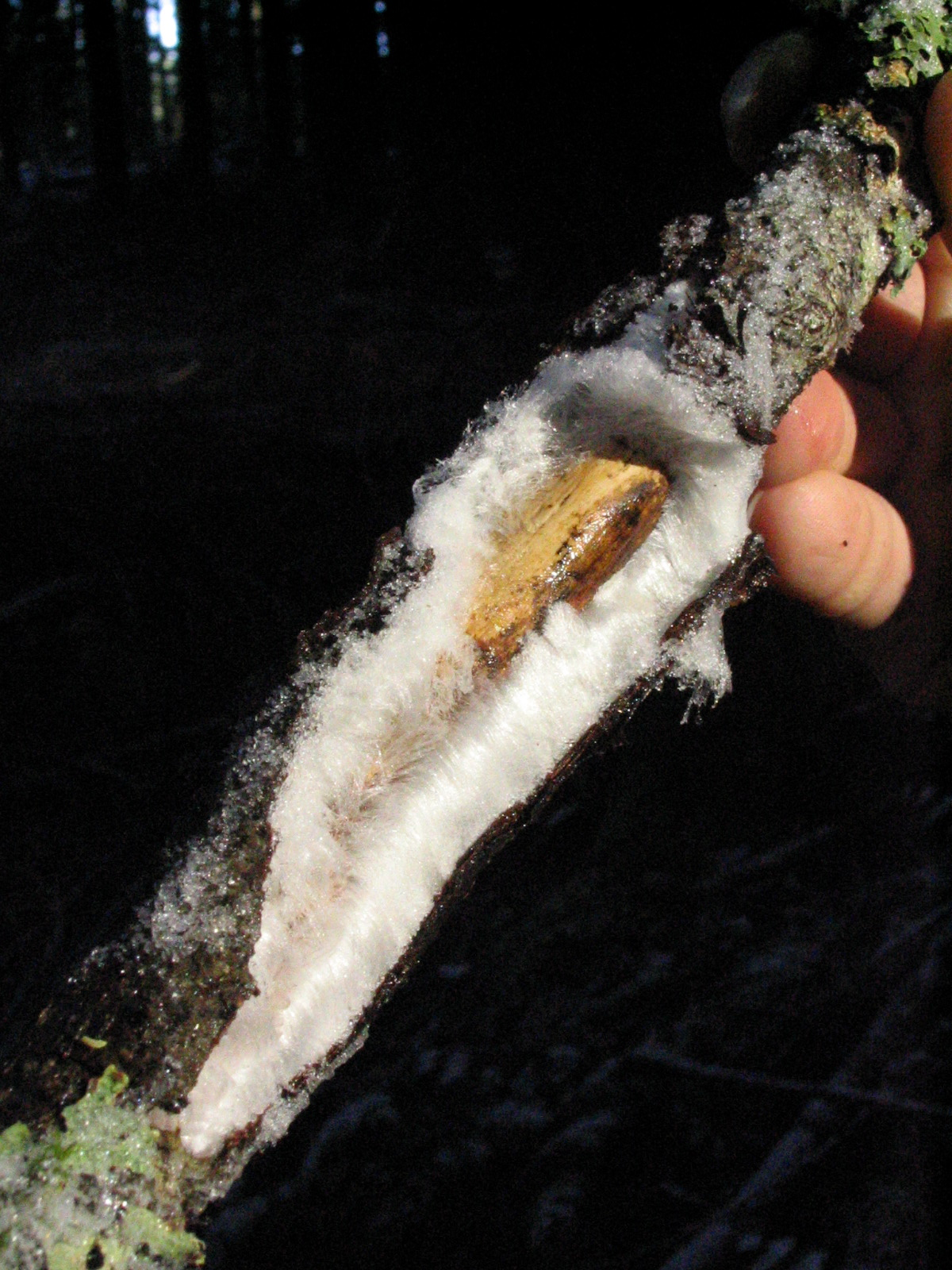
Example of hair ice, British Columbia, Canada

Hair ice, also known as ice wool or frost beard, is a type of ice that forms on dead wood and takes the shape of fine, silky hair. It is somewhat uncommon, and has been reported mostly at latitudes between 45 and 55 °N in broadleaf forests. The meteorologist (and discoverer of continental drift) Alfred Wegener described hair ice on wet dead wood in 1918, assuming some specific fungi as the catalyst, a theory mostly confirmed by Gerhart Wagner and Christian Mätzler in 2005. In 2015, the fungus Exidiopsis effusa was identified as key to the formation of hair ice.

== Formation ==
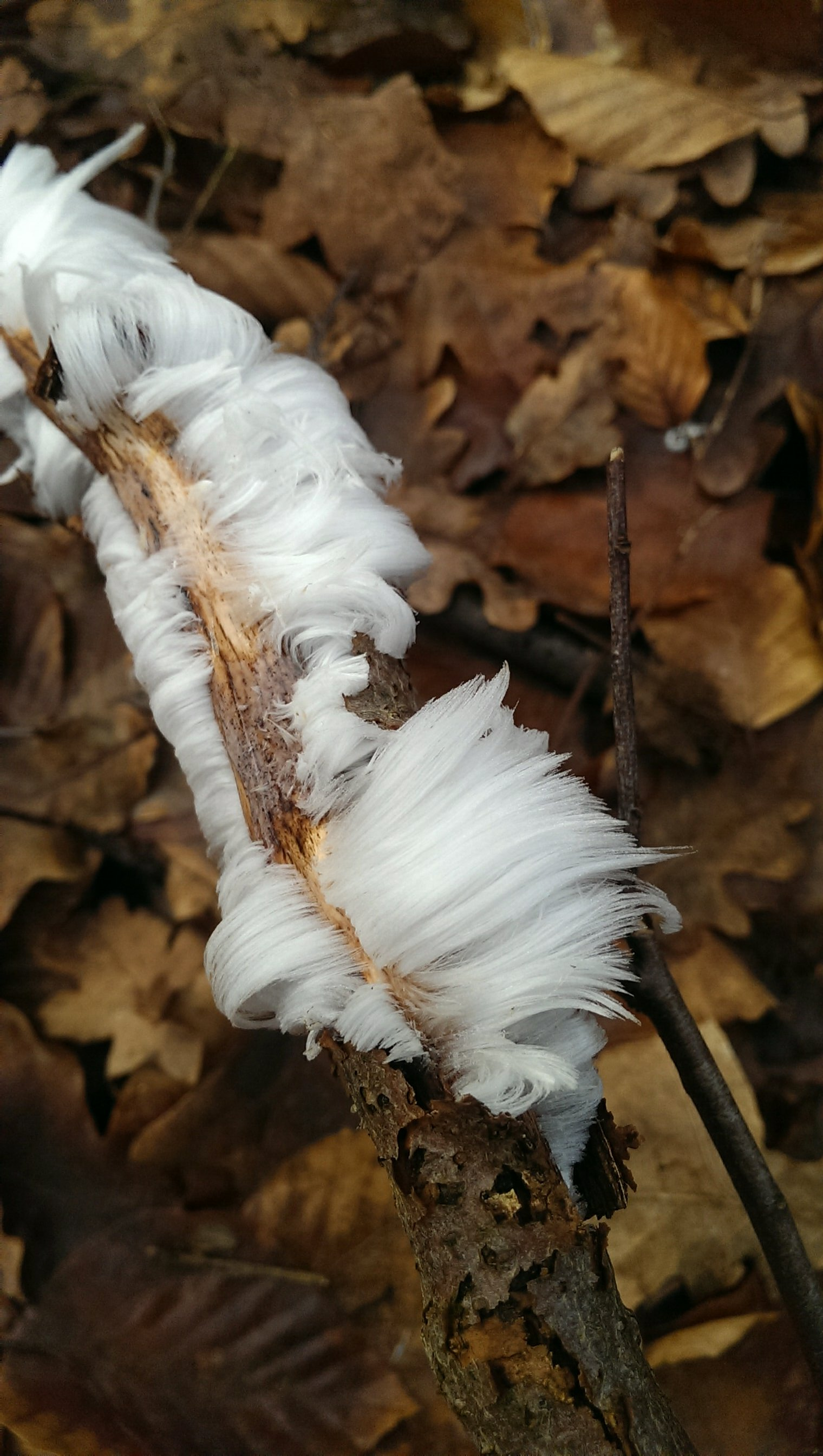
Hair ice on a branch

Hair ice forms on moist, rotting wood from broadleaf trees when temperatures are slightly under 0 °C (32 °F) and the air is humid. The hairs appear to root at the mouth of wood rays (never on the bark), and their thickness is similar to the diameter of the wood ray channels. A piece of wood that produces hair ice once may continue to produce it over several years.

Each of the smooth, silky hairs has a diameter of about 0.02 mm (0.0008 in) and a length of up to 20 cm (8 in). The hairs are brittle, but take the shape of curls and waves. They can maintain their shape for hours and sometimes days. This long lifetime indicates that something is preventing the small ice crystals from recrystallizing into larger ones, since recrystallization normally occurs very quickly at temperatures near 0 °C (32 °F).

In 2015, German and Swiss scientists identified the fungus Exidiopsis effusa as key to the formation of hair ice. The fungus was found on every hair ice sample examined by the researchers, and disabling the fungus with fungicide or hot water prevented hair ice formation. The fungus shapes the ice into fine hairs through an uncertain mechanism and likely stabilizes it by providing a recrystallization inhibitor similar to antifreeze proteins.

== See also ==
- Frost flower
- Hoarfrost
- Needle ice
