= Minnekhada Regional Park =

Park in Coquitlam, British Columbia

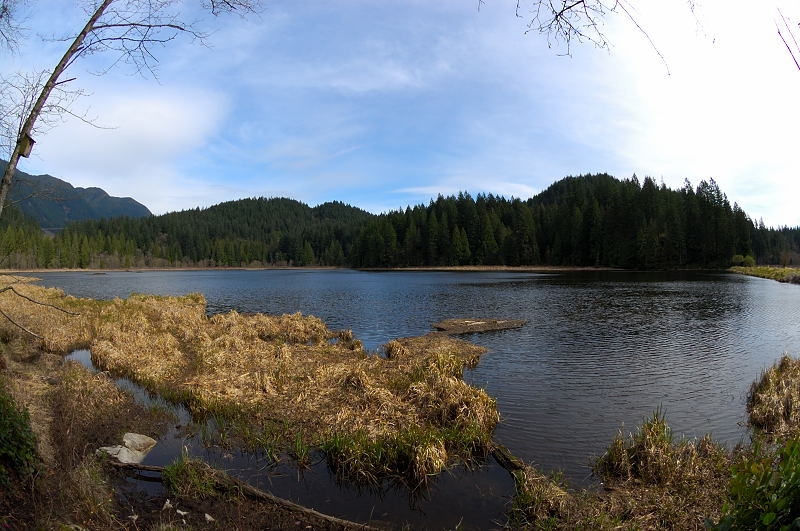

- Location within Greater Vancouver Regional District Location within British Columbia
- Location: Coquitlam, British Columbia
- Coordinates: 49°18′5.53″N 122°41′41.64″W
- Area: 200 ha (490 acres)
- Governing body: Metro Vancouver Regional District
- Website: metrovancouver.org/services/regional-parks/park/minnekhada-regional-park

Minnekhada Regional Park is a natural park situated in northeast Coquitlam, British Columbia, alongside Pitt-Addington Marsh and the Pitt River. It is over 200 hectares in size and features trails, rock knolls, abundant trees, birds, and other wildlife. At the centre of the park is the main marsh area, divided into upper and lower sections, divided by a dike and a small footbridge.

== Description ==
There are two main entrances to the park with parking facilities. The Quarry Road entrance serves as the primary trail access point for hikers and bird watchers. The Oliver Road entrance provides access to Minnekhada Lodge, as well as access to some of the trails. There is a secondary entrance in the northwest corner of the park, further north of the Quarry Road entrance, but there is no parking at this location.

Three primary trails through the park follow an eastern trajectory toward the Pitt-Addington Marsh boundary:

- Quarry Trail
- Mid-Marsh Trail
- Lodge/Fern Trails

Minnekhada Regional Park is a designated Wildlife Watch site. There are five lookout points in the park. Of these, Low Knoll with its full view of the lower marsh, and High Knoll with its 600 ft (180 m) elevation and view of the Pitt River and Pitt Meadows beyond, are among the most popular. A full perimeter trail hike through Quarry Trail, Fern Trail, and Lodge Trail covers a distance of 5.2 km (3.2 mi) (excluding excursions to lookout points such as High Knoll and Low Knoll).

Beyond the trails, lookouts, forests, and marshes, Minnekhada Regional Park has a long history as private property until the late 1970s. It includes over 200 hectares of farmhouses, stables, fields, marshes, and forests that cover the grounds, built by many of the owners. The extensive history of the park includes buildings and cabins; Minnekhada farm and hunting lodge are among the few that are still standing. These two buildings were the earliest buildings built on the lands of the park.

=== Minnekhada Lodge ===
Minnekhada Lodge was built as a country retreat for hunting in 1934 by Lieutenant Governor Eric Hamber. Hamber hosted hunting retreats for his friends throughout the year and needed a place for his guests to sleep during their stays and as a retreat to get away.

The lodge cost approximately $50,000 to build. Once it was built, Minnekhada Lodge was a place for entertainment instead of just farmland. High-profile guests would come to unwind and dine at the lodge. Cedar and Oliver Drive were paved so that roads were better suited to accommodate upper-class visitors. It was rumoured that Queen Elizabeth and George VI visited the lodge in 1939.

It was donated to the Greater Vancouver Regional District (GVRD) by the provincial government in 1984. The rooms and grounds of the lodge are open to the public on many Sundays throughout the year. Today, the hunting lodge is open to the public on the first Sunday of most months, from the hours of 1 p.m. to 4 p.m.

=== Minnekhada Farm ===
In the 20th century, Minnekhada Farm cycled through several different agricultural products such as beef cattle, sheep, and dairy as well as vegetables. It was then sold to many other buyers; the 415-hectare property was chartered to the Provincial Agricultural Land Commission, by the Ministry of Lands, Parks, and Housing. In this charter, 290 hectares were given to farmers for a 20-year period, under an agricultural lease. Nowadays, 46 of the total 200 hectares of Minnekhada Regional Park are the farm itself.

Minnekhada Farm was added to the park in 1995. The GVRD is currently restoring its fields and buildings as a heritage estate farm and equestrian centre. There is currently no access to Minnekhada Farm.

== History ==
The Kwikwetlem and Katzie First Nations respectively occupied the lands in and around Coquitlam Lake and Pitt River watersheds for thousands of years. Both nations relocated from high to low points to follow the plant and animal cycles through the seasons. Materials for tools, shelters, clothing, food, and medicine were all obtained from the natural world. Significant archaeological sites such as those at Coquitlam Lake are among the oldest in the lower mainland and point explicitly to the rich history of these nations’ occupation of these lands.

=== Harry L. Jenkins ===
In 1912, the farm was purchased by Harry Leroy Jenkins, a wealthy lumberman from Minnesota who then put the farm's ownership in the title of Anna S. Jenkins Estate Incorporated Limited. The company that Jenkins established included the Minnekhada dairy farm. The name 'Minnekhada' comes from the Sioux language which means 'rattling water' (mini meaning water and kahda meaning to rattle).

=== Eric Hamber ===
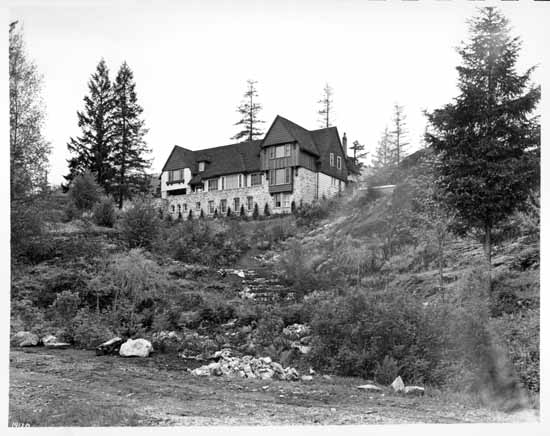
Eric Hamber's ranch/lodge

The first person to put the land to mass use was Eric Hamber. Hamber's plan for Minnekhada Farm was to continue the horse breeding operation, as well as hay and oats, but to his surprise, his wife, Aldyen, convinced him to turn the farm into a real and functioning farm, completed with livestock and vegetables to grow. This change caused a new growth in buildings, with new stables and barns being built. In terms of hunting, Minnekhada was utilized for its land, in hunting and horse riding ways by Hamber and his acquaintances. The marsh was the main target for hunting, as the mass abundance of buckwheat was suitable for luring ducks to the area.

=== Clarence Wallace ===
When Hamber became unable to care for the land and animals as well as hunt, he sold the property to his friend, Colonel Clarence Wallace. Eric Hamber and Clarence Wallace both had an impact on British Columbia's development, as they both owned large companies in timber and shipping as well as the position of Lieutenant Governor of British Columbia. Wallace was the owner of Burrard DryDocks, and Hamber was the president of BC Mills, Timber and Trading Company.

Wallace continued to use the lodge for hunting and as a weekend getaway. In the late 1970s, some of the forest by the lodge was logged. The logging occurred as a way to administer vegetation and wildlife studies prior to the park's development. At the time of the logging, the park's forests were considered to be a climax forest. Afterwards, the regeneration happened naturally with trees like the Red Alder taking their place. It was not known how much or what kind of trees were logged.

=== After Clarence Wallace ===
In 1974, Clarence Wallace decided to sell Minnekhada due to his failing health. In 1975, Minnekhada was sold to a series of land developers under a land use plan created by Dave Barrett's New Democratic Party (NDP). In addition, the land was added to British Columbia's Agricultural Land Reserve. After the NDP's defeat later that year, the land was returned to the Crown and left alone. In the mid-1990's, the farm was obtained by the Greater Vancouver Regional District, and became an addition to Minnekhada Regional Park. The parks committee delegated that at least 125 hectares of the land should stay in a nature park state.

== Ecology ==
=== Habitat and ecosystems ===
Within its 200 hectares, the park brings together several types of habitats that support multiple species. That diversity is explained by the variation in different factors affecting the terrain. One is the topography, which varies between sea level and 170 meters in height. The wetness of the soil also influences the ecosystem and the types of vegetation. From dry to wet soils, the Minnekhada Regional Park report in 1983 made a distinction between 3 moisture regimes: subhydric to hydric, submesic to hygric, and very xeric to subxeric regime. A subhydric regime is defined as a wet soil for a significant part of the growing season and a hydric regime has a wet soil for most of the growing season. A submesic regime is a relatively dry regime, where the water is available for a short period. Finally, a xeric to subxeric regime is defined as desert-like soil, where the water is removed rapidly.

The marsh is located in the center of the park and is divided by a dyke, and into two sections: the upper marsh and the lower marsh. Throughout the years, the increase and decrease of the marshes' water has been at varying levels. Prior to the construction of the Pitt River dyke, the marsh was a floodplain, with high levels of water, and rich in nutrients. During the 1900s, the water level varied a lot and the nutrients that were flowing from the river were lost. This largely influenced the vegetation of the marsh, and thus, the species found.

Out of the whole park, Minnekhada Farm comprises 22%. As the site is affected by a restoration project, data has been collected to characterize the site. The water retention varies, and flooding occurs during periods of rainfall. The site is mainly open space with some trees and a few large rocks.

=== Vegetation ===
Within the three main ecosystems of the park, the Minnekhada Regional Park report characterizes nine ecosystem associations for the vegetation of the park. An ecosystem association in this report is defined as "an area of land capable of producing similar climax plant communities." The climax of each ecosystem association gives it a name: the first plant name is an herb, the second a shrub or a tree, and third, the main tree species. In general, there were two main tree species found. The nine ecosystems associations are designated as:

1. Lichen, salal, Douglas fir
2. Salal, hemlock, Douglas fir
3. Oregon grape, cedar, Douglas fir
4. Licorice fern, salal, Douglas fir, cedar
5. Sword fern, Douglas fir, cedar
6. Sword fern, foamflower, cedar
7. Salmonberry, sword fern, cedar
8. Skunk cabbage, cedar
9. Hylocomium, cedar

The two main tree species that are found in the park are the western red cedar (Thuja plicata) and the Douglas fir (Pseudotsuga menziesii). Western red cedar mostly occurs in the wetlands area of the park. The dry areas are dominated by the Douglas fir. Each of these ecosystem associations is characterized by its vegetation, moisture regime, soil type/parent material, landform, and points of interest.

The vegetation of the marsh varies in function of the water level: the northern section is much more moist whereas the southern section generally has a much lower water level. The marsh is dominated by hardhack and sweet gale.

Vegetation around the lodge is largely represented by three species: reed canarygrass (Phalaris arundinacea) which accounts for about 64%, hardhack (Spiraea douglasii) which accounts for 22%, and Cutleaf Blackberry (Rubus laciniatus) which makes up about 13%.

The park is also home to several species of moss, lichen, and mushrooms. With its wet condition, the Minnekhada Regional Park is the perfect habitat for common species of moss, such as Stairstep Moss (Hylocomium splendens), Lanky Moss (Rhytidiadelphus loreus), Badge Moss (

Plagiomnium insigne), Oregon Beaked Moss (Kindbergia oregana), and Douglas’ Neckera Moss (Neckera douglasii). For the lichen populations, the most common species found in the park is the Maritime Reindeer Lichen (Cladonia rangiferina). Lastly, there is a significant amount of fungi that can be seen around the park.

=== Birds ===
Several bird species are also annual or seasonal inhabitants of the park. In 1993, the Burke Mountain Naturalists listed 151 species of birds observed in the park, including hawks, owls, grouse, waterfowl, herons, woodpeckers, and songbirds. Sixteen waterfowl have been identified, including swans and ring-necked ducks.

=== Mammals ===
American black bears and mule deer are active each year around the park. Muskrats, raccoons, squirrels, beavers, river otters, and opossums also inhabit the area. Two maternity colonies of Townsend's big-eared bats are located at the Minnekhada farm. This species of bat is classified as threatened within British Columbia. Those bats are very vulnerable to disturbance; mainly by people. This species is found to be declining in many areas around the globe, including Mexico and the United States. In British Columbia, only a few maternity colonies have been recorded and two in Minnekhada Park so far. These bats can be identified by their large ears, which can reach half of their body length.

=== Amphibians and reptiles ===
Multiple reptiles and amphibians inhabit the park including snakes, salamanders, and frogs. Two species of great interest found in Minneakhada Park are the western painted turtle and the western toad. The western painted turtle is the only native freshwater turtle still present in British Columbia. The population's decline is mainly due to habitat loss and fragmentation as well as competition with the non-native red-eared slider. To assess the status of this endangered species and the long-term recovery plan, the Ministry of Environment initiated the Coastal Painted Turtle Project in 2008. They discovered that the majority of the sites have five or fewer turtles remaining. This project permits the release of more than 400 turtles into the Regional Park. Efforts are being made during nesting season to help the young survive early in life. They are also making efforts to rehabilitate a stable habitat for this species.

The western toad is common in most of British Columbia but is listed as a threatened species, due to future threats as their habitat is becoming rarer, but the population is secure and stable so far. One of the biggest threats to the toads is habitat destruction. The Minnekhada Park Association is conducting a monitoring program, with the goal of this program to study the migration pattern of the toads over time. Between 2010 and 2015, multiple observations of adult toads and toadlets have been conducted. People and domesticated animals such as dogs are the two biggest threats to the toad population in Minnekhada Regional Park. To protect their population, information was given to the visitors, and bridges over the creek were built.

== Indigenous involvement ==
There is not much information on First Nation involvement with the park. Neither of the nations who originally inhabited this land were involved in the process of turning it into a regional park. There is not much to say that they are involved in the current day management of the park as well. In July 2023 a financial agreement was made between the Greater Vancouver Regional District and the park association, ensuring $45,000 of funding to be paid in a three- year aggregate amount to the MPA. Among the list of priorities for the MPA were to educate and improve awareness of the cultural history of the park, as well as to foster public ideas and input.

== Wildfire ==
In October 2022, Minnekhada Regional Park was heavily impacted by wildfires. The fire grew out of control and went from 2 hectares to 11 hectares over the span of a day, and then it later grew to 14 hectares (34 acres). One of the reasons why this fire was so difficult to contain was due to Minnekhada's steep terrain which was difficult for the firefighters to safely navigate. Because of this steepness, the fire which began on the high knoll then caused blazing branches to drop onto the forest below, causing lower areas to catch on fire as well. This fire blazed while British Columbia was experiencing extremely high temperatures and dry conditions for October. This fire was described as a warning that even the smallest heat source can cause a fire and lead to devastation. The tri-cities areas witnessed and inhaled smoke from the day the fire erupted to the remaining days after. This fire was a "wake-up call" to those living near Minnekhada Regional Park and in forested areas around the lower mainland. British Columbia has seen record high temperatures and dry conditions leading to record high numbers and severity of wildfires, which suggests that Minnekhada Regional Park and other parks in the lower mainland must be prepared to deal with more wildfires to keep up with the changing climate.
