= University of British Columbia Vancouver =

Main campus of the University of British Columbia

The University of British Columbia Vancouver
- Unincorporated area
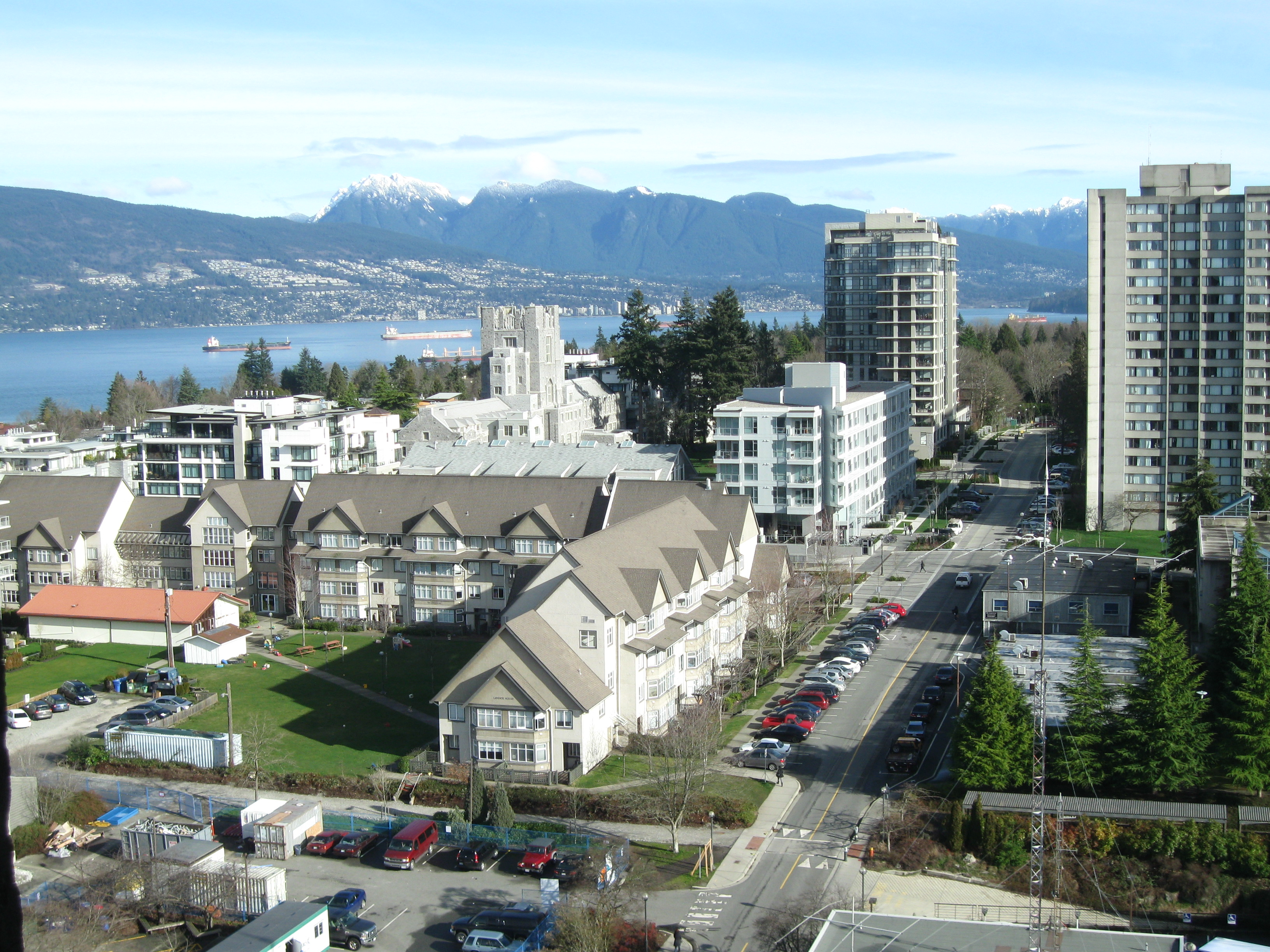

- Location of UBC Vancouver in Metro Vancouver
- Coordinates: 49.265°N 123.242°W
- Country: Canada
- Province: British Columbia
- Regional district: Metro Vancouver
- Electoral area: Electoral Area A

Government
  - Chair of the Board of Governors: Miranda Lam
  - MP: Wade Grant
  - MLA: David Eby
  - MVRD Director: Jen McCutcheon

Area
  - Total: 402 ha (990 acres)

Population (2021)
  - Total: 15,103
  - Density: 3,726.4/km^{2} (9,651/sq mi)
  - Daytime: 80,000
- Website: ubc.ca/vancouver

The University of British Columbia Vancouver (UBC Vancouver or UBCV), officially known as the Point Grey campus lands, is an unincorporated area that contains the main campus of the University of British Columbia in Metro Vancouver, British Columbia, Canada. Located at the western tip of the Point Grey Peninsula, UBC Vancouver is bordered only by the University Endowment Lands, which separate the campus from the City of Vancouver.

The campus is home to close to 55,000 undergraduate and graduate students. As of the 2024–2025 academic year, UBC Vancouver enrolled just under 61,000 students, including approximately 49,000 undergraduate and 11,000 graduate students. The 402-hectare (993-acre) campus is also home to a numerous residential housing developments that were built by UBC in conjunction with private developers. As it is not part of a municipality, most services at UBC Vancouver are provided by the University of British Columbia itself, whose board of governors is empowered to adopt a land-use plan for the campus lands.

The campus is situated on the traditional, ancestral and unceded territory of the Musqueam people, who have maintained a continuous relationship with the Point Grey Peninsula for thousands of years. Today, UBC works in partnership with Musqueam on planning, stewardship and campus development initiatives. The partnership also supports Indigenous engagement, cultural recognition and collaborative decision-making across the Vancouver campus.

== History ==
The University of British Columbia was established in 1908. Teaching began in temporary facilities at the Fairview campus in 1915 before the university officially opened its permanent Point Grey campus in 1925. Since then, the campus has expanded in both its academic facilities and residential neighbourhoods.

Campus development has increasingly been guided by long-term land-use planning. Residential neighbourhoods including Hampton Place, Hawthorn Place and Wesbrook Place were developed as part of UBC’s strategy to create a complete university community while supporting academic expansion.

== Housing ==
=== Private residential neighbourhoods ===
UBC Vancouver contains several private residential neighbourhoods. These include Chancellor Place, East Campus, Hampton Place, Hawthorn Place and Wesbrook Place. Together, these neighbourhoods provide housing for faculty, staff, students and other residents while generating revenue to support the university's academic mission. These neighbourhoods were developed through UBC’s campus planning process, beginning with Hampton Place in the late 1980s and followed by later neighbourhood plans for Chancellor Place, Hawthorn Place, East Campus and Wesbrook Place.

=== Student housing ===
There are numerous student housing residences throughout UBC's campus. These residences serve varying demographics. For example, some serve just first-year students, while others serve students with families and visiting scholars. UBC continues to expand on-campus accommodation as part of its long-term strategy to improve housing affordability and increase student access to campus housing.

==== First-year housing ====
First-year residences include Place Vanier, Totem Park and Orchard Commons.

==== New and returning student housing ====
Accommodation for returning students includes Ritsumeikan–UBC House and Walter Gage Residence.

==== Upper-year and graduate housing ====
Housing for upper-year and graduate students includes Fairview Crescent, Marine Drive, Iona House, Brock Commons Tallwood House, Fraser Hall, Ponderosa Commons, Thunderbird, Acadia Park, Green College, St. John's College, Exchange, and tə šxʷhəleləm̓s tə k̓ʷaƛ̓kʷəʔaʔɬ (The Houses of the Ones Belonging to the Saltwater).

In 2024, the Province of British Columbia announced funding to support additional affordable student housing at UBC Vancouver. Brock Commons Phase 2, currently under development, will add approximately 600 student beds while incorporating mass timber construction and mixed-use academic, administrative and residential space.

== Demographics ==
As of the 2021 census, UBC Vancouver has a population of 15,103. Between 2016 and 2021, UBC Vancouver's population grew by 2,247 due to the expansion of on-campus residential development.

== Government and politics ==
As an unincorporated area, UBC Vancouver has no mayor or council. Instead, the lands are owned in fee simple by the UBC Board of Governors, who perform many of the functions of a municipal government. Like at all other universities in British Columbia, the board is empowered by the University Act to make rules on the management and control of university property and buildings, make traffic and parking rules, and enforce its rules by fines. Uniquely for UBC Vancouver, the board is also vested with the authority to adopt a land use plan for the campus lands, subject to review by the Minister of Higher Education. An updated land use plan, named Campus Vision 2050, was adopted by UBC for the Point Grey campus lands in July 2024, which establishes a long-term framework for academic development, housing, transportation, sustainability and public realm improvements across the Point Grey campus while recognising Musqueam partnership in future planning. The UBC board's quasi-municipal powers are largely delegated to UBC Campus and Community Planning, a division of the university's vice-president of external relations.

For the purposes of representation on the Metro Vancouver Board of Directors, UBC Vancouver is part of Electoral Area A. The current Electoral Area A director is Jen McCutcheon.

For provincial elections, UBC Vancouver falls under the Vancouver-Point Grey electoral riding. The current Member of the Legislative Assembly is David Eby.

For federal elections, UBC Vancouver is in the Vancouver Quadra electoral riding. The seat is held by Wade Grant.

== Transportation ==
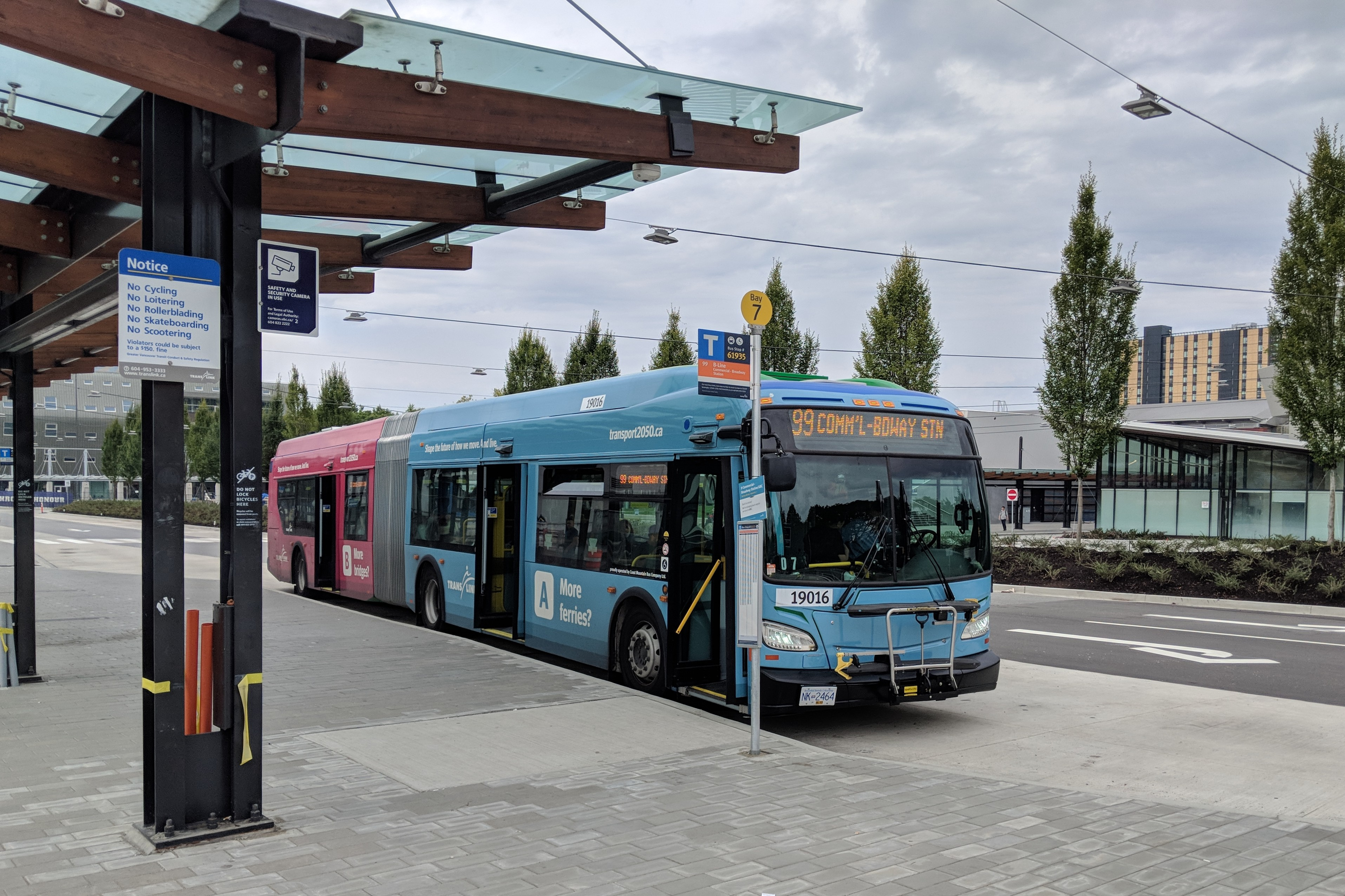
A 99 B-Line bus at UBC Exchange

The internal campus street grid is mostly organized as a number of east–west roads intersecting a series of north–south malls. There are few through streets on campus as both Main Mall and University Boulevard are largely pedestrian streets, bisecting the campus in both the east–west and north–south directions. The campus is ringed by a number of arterial roads providing access to the University Endowment Lands and the City of Vancouver. These roads – consisting of NW and SW Marine Drive, Chancellor Boulevard, University Boulevard and 16th Avenue – are owned and maintained by the Ministry of Transportation and Transit as part of the provincial highway system.

The UBC campus is a major destination for the regional public transit system operated by TransLink. The UBC Exchange is a major bus terminus that serves two of the busiest bus routes in the region: the 99 B-Line to Broadway and the R4 RapidBus to 41st Avenue; both routes link to the SkyTrain. Other bus routes to UBC Vancouver include the 4, 9, 14, 25, 33, 44, 68, 84 and N17. An extension of the SkyTrain network to replace the 99 B-Line and connect the UBC campus is part of long-term plans from TransLink and the provincial government but remains unfunded. The proposed Millennium Line UBC Extension would extend rapid transit from Arbutus Station to the UBC campus, with planning and technical work continuing while funding for construction is sought. The U-Pass BC is a universal transit pass that is offered at a discount for students and faculty to offset commuting costs.

== Campus academic facilities ==
=== AMS Student Nest ===
The Nest is home to most of the student clubs at UBC, as well as UBC Food Services, two convenience stores, an RBC Bank, a salon, both a bar and a pub, a movie theatre, and other student services. It is owned and operated by the Alma Mater Society of the University of British Columbia.

=== Peter A. Allard School of Law ===
The Peter A. Allard School of Law is UBC's faculty of law. Founded in 1945, it was renamed after an alumnus in 2015 after a $30-million donation. The Allard School of Law offers a wide range of courses, especially in Indigenous law, environmental law, and business law.

== Museums and galleries ==
There are also several museums and performing arts theatres on campus, including the Morris and Helen Belkin Art Gallery, the Museum of Anthropology at UBC, the Beaty Biodiversity Museum, the Frederic Wood Theatre, and the Chan Centre.

== Sports and recreation ==
There are many sports facilities located on the UBC campus. UBC's sports teams are called the UBC Thunderbirds and they play at various locations on campus, including War Memorial Gym, Thunderbird Stadium, UBC Aquatic Centre and Thunderbird Winter Sports Centre. The Student Recreation Centre (REC) is home to intramural sports for students.

=== 2010 Winter Olympics ===
For the 2010 Winter Olympics and Paralympics, the Thunderbird Winter Sports Centre was replaced by a newer building, named the Doug Mitchell Thunderbird Sports Centre. Demolition of the old arena began in April 2006 and the arena opened on July 7, 2008. The new structure houses three ice rinks, with the main rink accommodating 6,800 spectators.

== Economy ==
=== Film industry ===
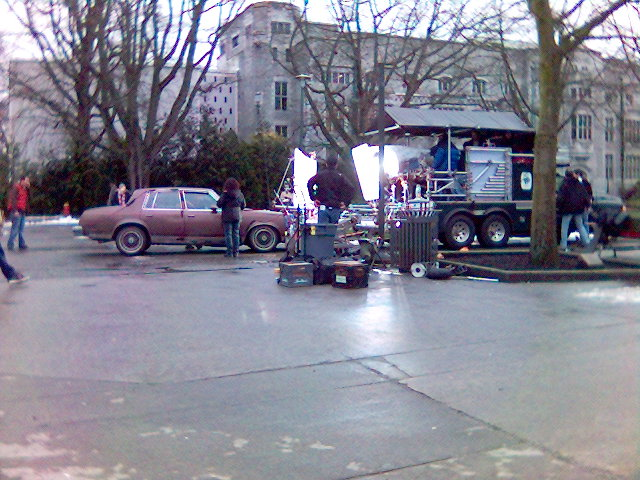
Wind Chill filming on location at the UBC campus

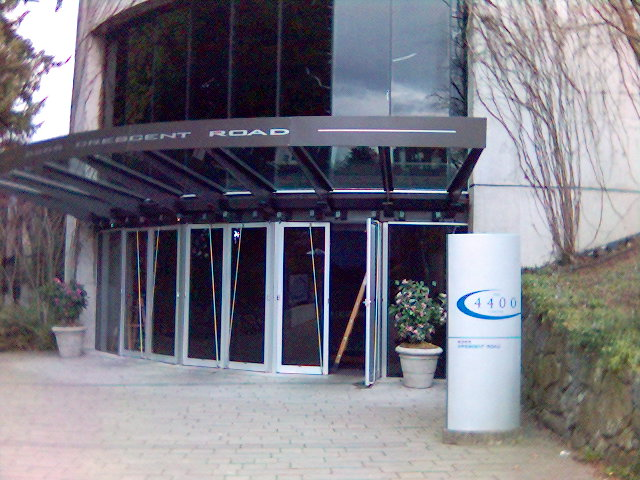
Chan Centre at UBC as "The 4400 Center" during filming of The 4400

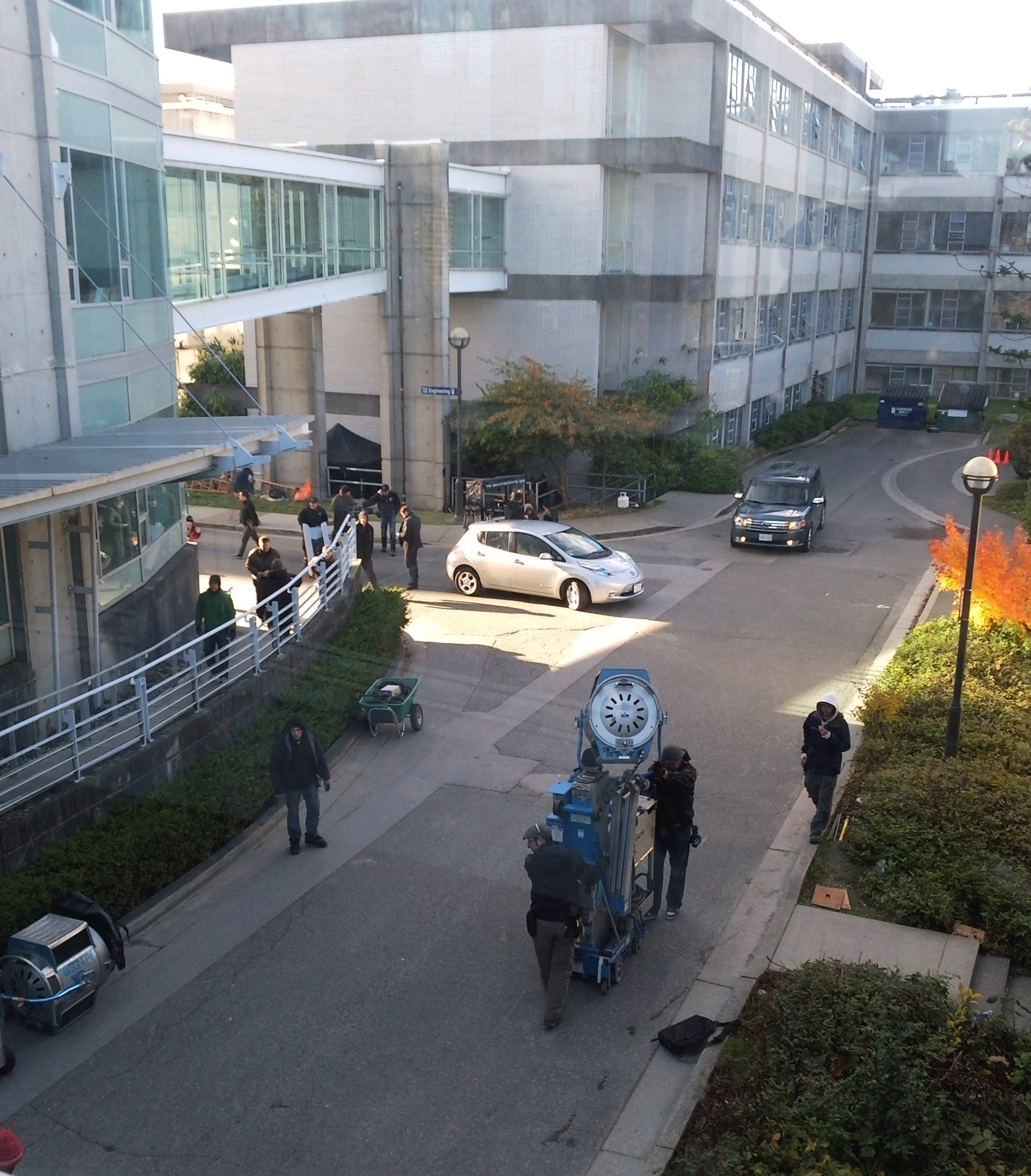
Fringe filming at UBC

Some notable movies and television shows shot on campus include:

- X-Men Origins: Wolverine: Buchanan Tower
- The Exorcism of Emily Rose: UBC's MacMillan Building as the courthouse, Kenny Building as the dorm and Buchanan Building
- 88 Minutes: UBC's Koerner Library area
- Taken: UBC's General Services Administration Building for hostage scenes
- Try Seventeen: UBC's Chan Centre for student orientation scenes
- She's the Man: UBC's Thunderbird Stadium for soccer stadium scenes
- The Butterfly Effect: Koerner Library area, Room 100 of the UBC Geography Building as the lecture hall, and the main mall.
- Wind Chill: UBC's Main Mall
- The 4400: Chan Centre as "The 4400 Center," University Marketplace
- Antitrust: Chan Centre
- Smallville: Koerner and Main Libraries, for exteriors
- Battlestar Galactica: Rose Garden and Chan Centre exterior for "Cloud Nine"
- MacGyver: Various campus exteriors
- Fringe: Flagpole Plaza, Chan Centre exterior and interior, Macleod and Brimacombe Buildings exterior
- Off Campus: Various campus locations
