= First Narrows =

First Narrows may refer to:

- First Narrows (Strait of Magellan) - in Spanish "Primera Angostura", the first narrows in the Strait of Magellan, when proceeding east to west.
- First Narrows (Vancouver), Vancouver's first narrows protects the main harbour, east of the city the second narrows opens into several long bays - see DGS Mastodon
