= Clyde McRae =

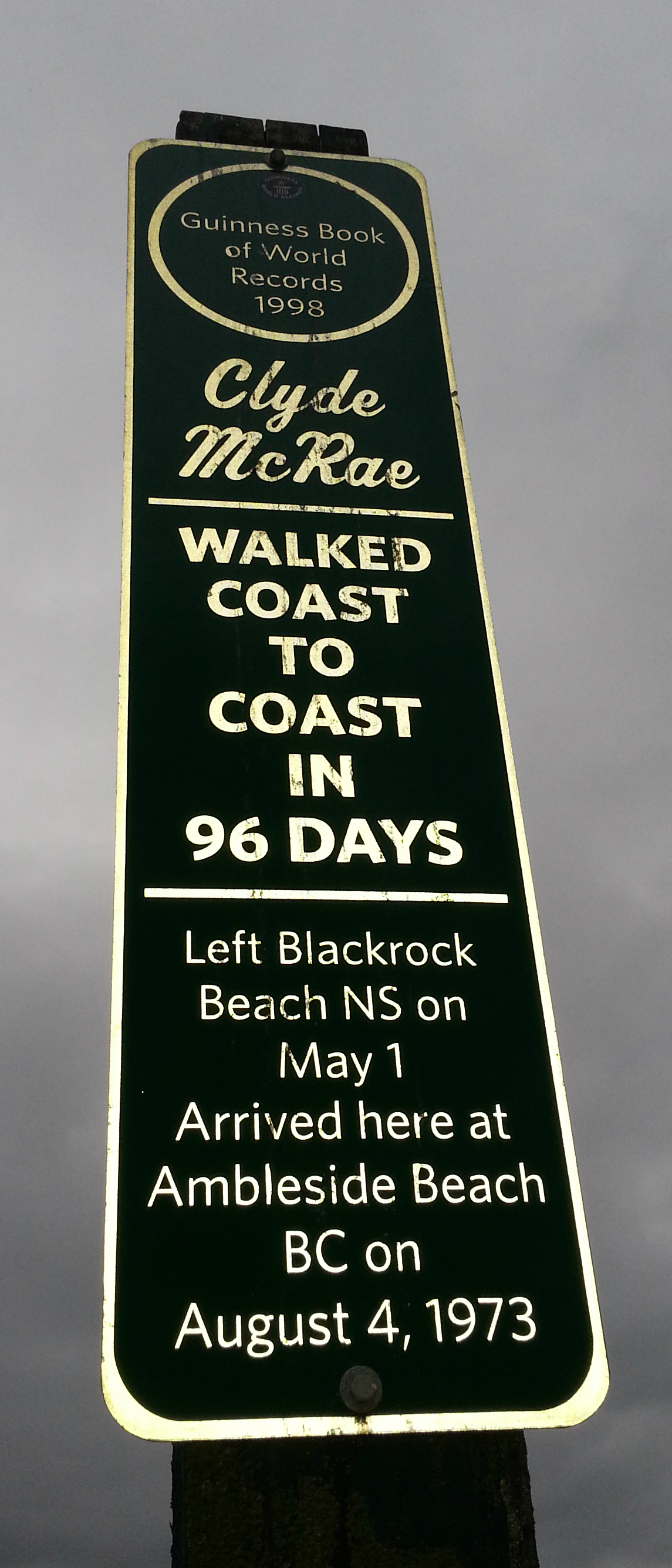
This sign commemorates McRae's achievement. It stands on Ambleside Beach, West Vancouver, British Columbia, Canada.

Clyde McRae is a world record holder for the Fastest Trans-Canada Walk. McRae walked 6,057 km (3,764 miles) from Halifax to Vancouver for 96 days from May 1 to August 4, 1973. In part, McRae completed the feat to publicize the 1973 New Westminster-Burnaby Canada Summer Games. His record was first published in the 1998 Guinness Book of World Records.
