= First Narrows (Vancouver) =

Narrow entrance to Burrard Inlet

Coordinates: 49°19′00″N 123°08′26″W

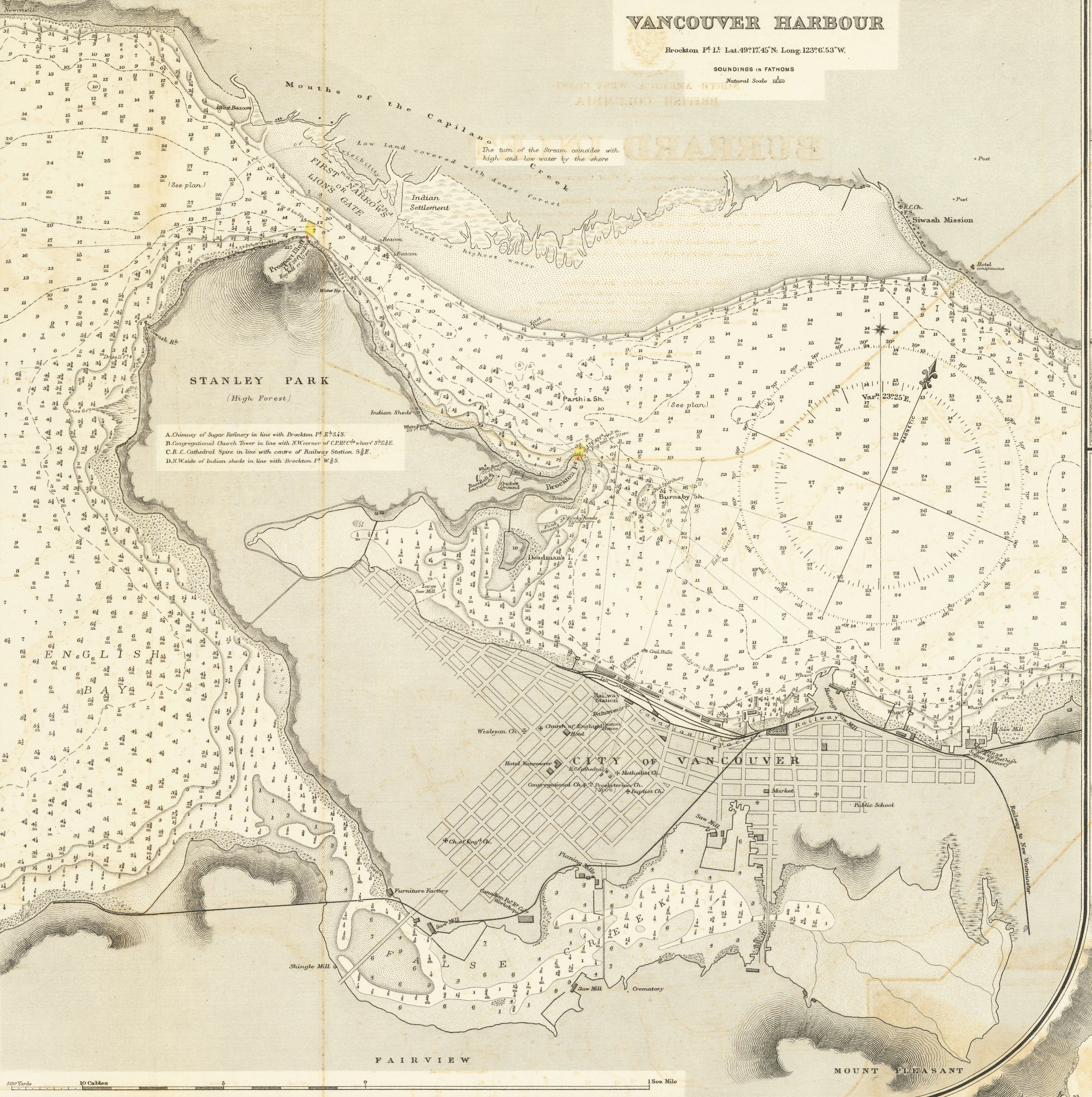
First Narrows forms the western mouth of Vancouver's inner harbour.

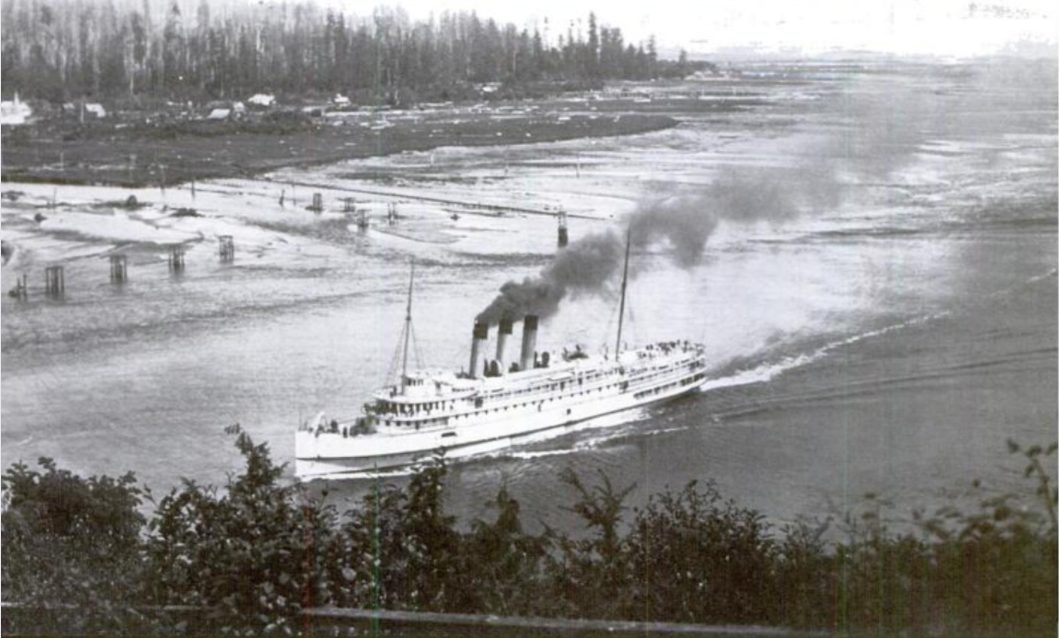
Prior to the dredging shallow sandbanks extended far from the north shore.

First Narrows is the official name for the entrance to Burrard Inlet, the mouth of Vancouver, British Columbia's inner harbour.

== Name origin ==
Captain George Henry Richards named the First Narrows and Second Narrows during his 1859–60 survey for the British Admiralty. Judge Gray suggested the alternative name of "Lion's Gate" in 1889 with respect to the Lions to the north, a name generally adopted for the later bridge.

== Dredging ==
In 1909, the DGS Mastodon was ordered from a shipyard in Scotland. She was commissioned in 1911. Her crew worked 24 hours a day, six days a week, from 1912 to 1917, to dredge the channel. The 5 million tons of excavated material was a mixture of blue clay with embedded rocks and boulders. Some of the boulders were too large to be scooped up by the dredge's buckets, and had to be smashed first. The project widened the waterway from 270 metres (900 ft) to 430 metres (1,400 ft).

== Ferry ==
In 1909, John Lawson, John Sinclair, William Thompson, and Robert McPherson founded the Ambleside to Gastown ferry service with a 35-passenger converted fishing boat. An experimental English Bay run proved unsuccessful. In 1912, the municipality of West Vancouver acquired the unprofitable enterprise. The terminal relocated from the foot of 17th St to 14th St, where the former ferry building still stands. Over time, larger vessels, which could carry up to 120 passengers, replaced the original ones. The bridge opening and the inauguration of bus transit led to the demise of the ferry service, which ceased operations in 1947.

== Bridge ==
The Lions Gate Bridge opened in 1938 and was designed to have enough clearance to permit ocean going vessels to transit beneath.
