= Lions Gate Bridge =

Suspension bridge in Vancouver, Canada

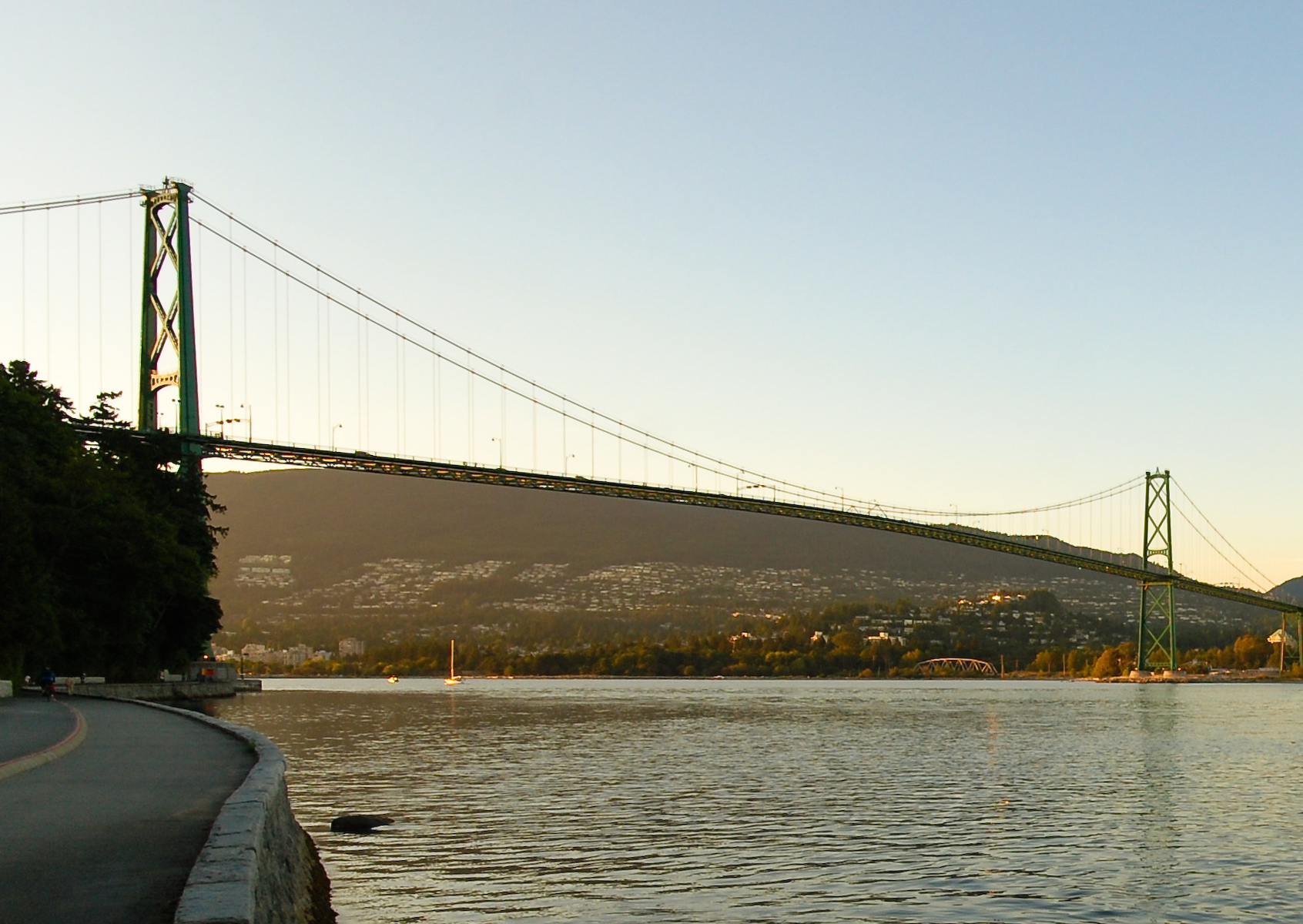
- View from Stanley Park in downtown Vancouver, 2008
- Coordinates: 49°18′55″N 123°8′18″W
- Carries: Three lanes of Highway 1A / Highway 99, pedestrians and bicycles
- Crosses: Burrard Inlet
- Locale: Vancouver; West Vancouver
- Official name: First Narrows Bridge
- Owner: British Columbia Ministry of Transportation and Infrastructure

Characteristics
- Design: Suspension bridge
- Total length: 1,823 m (5,981 ft)
- Height: 111 m (364 ft)
- Longest span: 473 m (1,552 ft)
- Load limit: 13 tonnes (12.8 long tons; 14.3 short tons)
- Clearance below: 61 m (200 ft)

History
- Designer: Charles Nicholas Monsarrat; Philip Louis Pratley
- Construction start: March 31, 1937; 89 years ago
- Opened: November 14, 1938; 87 years ago

Statistics
- Daily traffic: 55,596 (2024)

National Historic Site of Canada
- Official name: Lions Gate Bridge National Historic Site of Canada
- Designated: March 24, 2005
- Reference no.: 11711

Location
- Interactive map of Lions Gate Bridge

The Lions Gate Bridge, opened in 1938 and officially known as the First Narrows Bridge, is a suspension bridge that crosses the first narrows of Burrard Inlet and connects the City of Vancouver, British Columbia, to the North Shore municipalities of the District of North Vancouver, the City of North Vancouver, and West Vancouver. The term "Lions Gate" refers to the Lions, a pair of mountain peaks north of Vancouver. Northbound traffic on the bridge heads in their general direction. A pair of cast concrete lions, designed by sculptor Charles Marega, were placed on either side of the south approach to the bridge in January 1939.

The total length of the bridge including the north viaduct is 1,823 metres (5,981 ft). The length including approach spans is 1,517.3 metres (4,978 ft), the main span alone is 473 metres (1,552 ft), the tower height is 111 metres (364 ft), and it has a ship's clearance of 61 metres (200 ft). Prospect Point in Stanley Park offered a good high south end to the bridge, but the low flat delta land to the north required construction of the extensive North Viaduct.

The bridge has three lanes, with the middle being a reversible lane indicated by signals. The centre lane changes direction to accommodate for traffic patterns. The traffic volume on the bridge is 60,000–70,000 vehicles per day. Trucks exceeding 13 tonnes (12.8 long tons; 14.3 short tons) are prohibited, as are vehicles using studded tires. The bridge forms part of Highways 99 and 1A.

On March 24, 2005, the Lions Gate Bridge was designated a National Historic Site of Canada.

== History ==
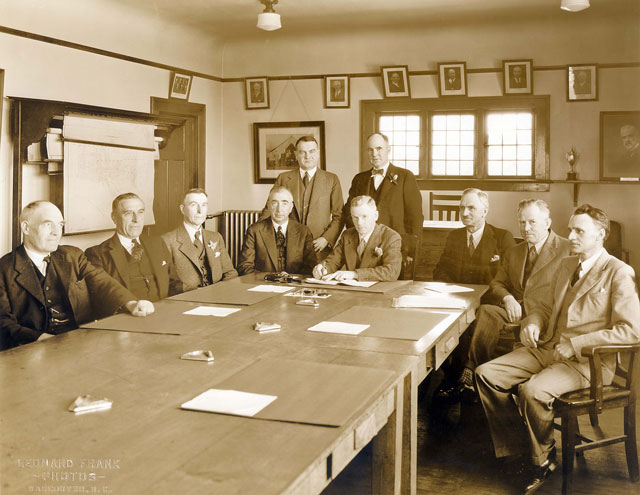
Signing the First Narrows Bridge agreement, May 1934

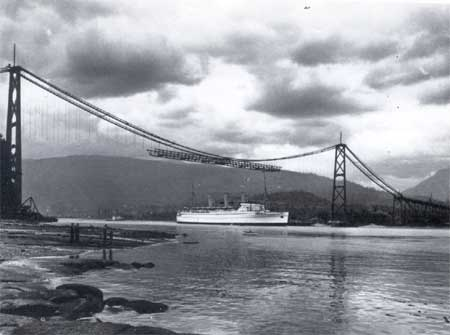
Lions Gate Bridge under construction, 1938

In 1890, land speculator George Grant Mackay wrote in the local paper that he foresaw a bridge over the first narrows. The First Narrows ferry operated between Ambleside and Gastown from 1909 to 1947. The decision on whether to build the bridge was put to the electorate of Vancouver in 1927, but the first plebiscite was defeated and the idea was put to rest for the time being.

Alfred James Towle Taylor, an engineer with a land interest in the construction of the bridge, worked to overcome local opposition to its construction. Taylor was able to convince Walter Guinness of the Guinness family (of the Irish stout fame) to invest in the land on the north shore of Burrard Inlet. They purchased 1,902 hectares (4,700 acres) of West Vancouver mountainside through a syndicate called British Pacific Properties Ltd.

On December 13, 1933, a second plebiscite was held, passing with 70 percent in favour. After considerable further negotiations with the federal government, approval was finally granted, with the requirement that Vancouver materials and workmen be used as much as possible to provide employment during the Great Depression. The 1933 bylaw authorizing construction included a provision mandating that "no Asiatic person shall be employed in or upon any part of the undertaking or other works".

The bridge was designed by the Montreal firm Monsarrat and Pratley, which was later responsible for the Angus L. Macdonald Bridge in Halifax, Nova Scotia, using a similar design. Other companies involved in the construction of the bridge included Swan Wooster Engineering, Parsons Brinckerhoff Quade & Douglas, Rowan Williams Davies & Irwin Inc., Canron Western Constructors, Dominion Bridge Company, American Bridge Company.

Construction began on March 31, 1937. After one and a half years and a cost of CA$5,873,837, the bridge opened to traffic on November 14, 1938. The official opening was held on May 26, 1939, at the Capilano Golf Club. On May 29, 1939, King George VI and Queen Elizabeth crossed the bridge during their royal visit to Canada. A toll of 25 cents was charged for each car or horse and carriage; five cents was charged for pedestrians or bicycles.

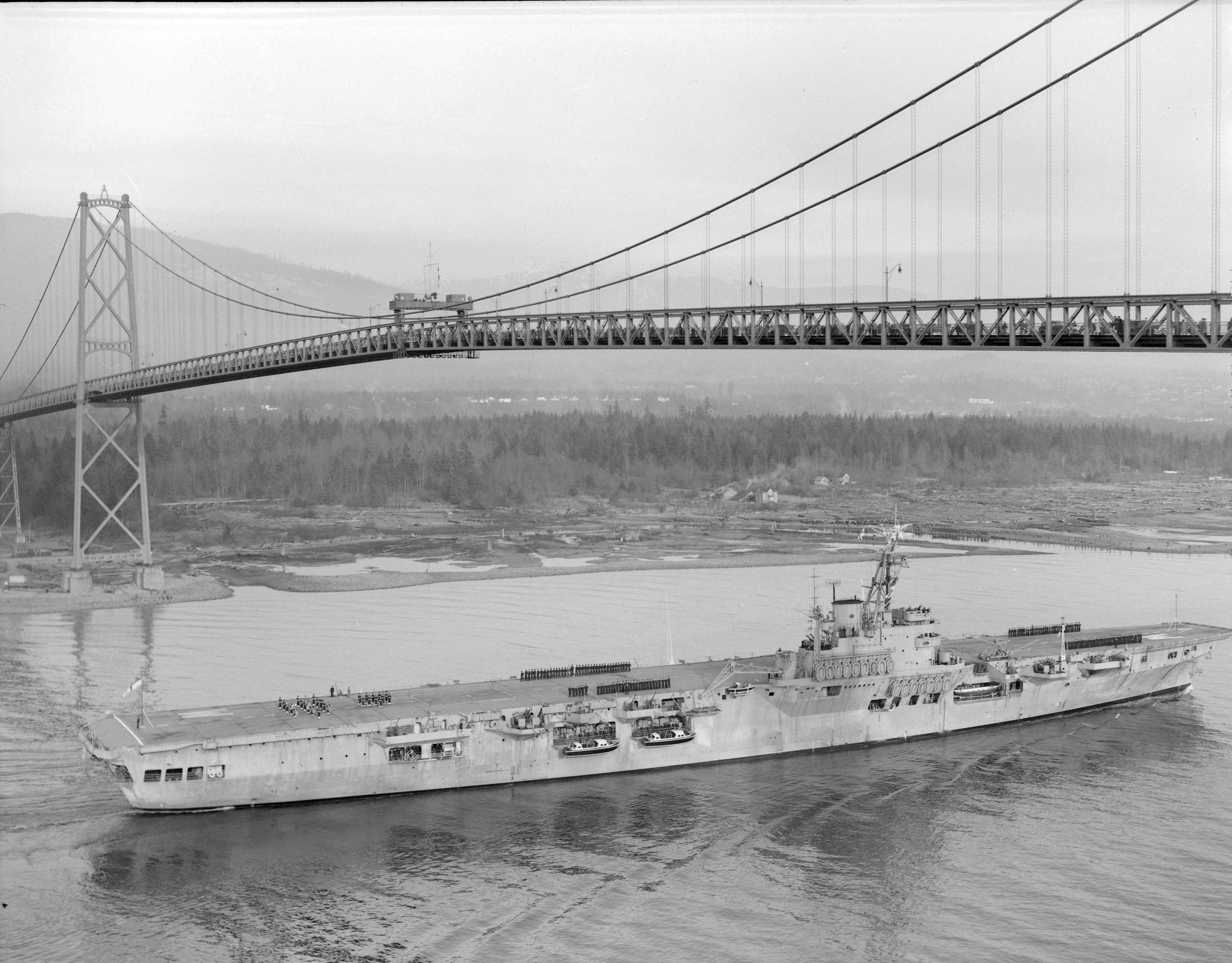
HMCS Warrior passes under Lions Gate Bridge, 1947

The bridge was built with two lanes, but a third reversible lane was added on May 19, 1952, to add capacity during peak periods in the peak direction. The system cost $18,000 and was controlled with signs to indicate when the reversible centre lane was opened to traffic.

On January 20, 1955, the Guinness family sold the bridge to the province of British Columbia for $5,873,837 – the cost of the original construction. The government also considered plans to build a parallel span, which was estimated to cost $17 million in 1954, but these were shelved in favour of moving forward with the construction of the Second Narrows Bridge farther east up the Burrard Inlet and improving the existing Lions Gate Bridge.

A partial cloverleaf interchange was built in 1956 at Marine Way, located at the end of the bridge's north approach, and was followed by a new bridge over the Capilano River to address congestion issues.

The toll instituted by the Guinness family remained on the Lions Gate Bridge until April 1, 1963, as part of the provincial government's toll removal scheme for several bridges. The toll plaza at the north end of the bridge was later demolished.

In 1965, the centre lane controls were replaced with traffic signals.

In 1975, the deteriorating original concrete deck of the North Viaduct was replaced with a lighter, wider, and stronger steel orthotropic deck with wider lanes. This was carried out in sections using a series of short closures of the bridge; each time, one old section was lowered from the bridge and its replacement was put into place.

In 1986, the Guinness family, as a gift to Vancouver, purchased decorative lights that make it a distinctive nighttime landmark. The 170 lights were designed and installed by British engineer Ian Hayward and first lit up on February 19 of that year.

In 1994, a new counterflow system was introduced to the bridge to reduce congestion.

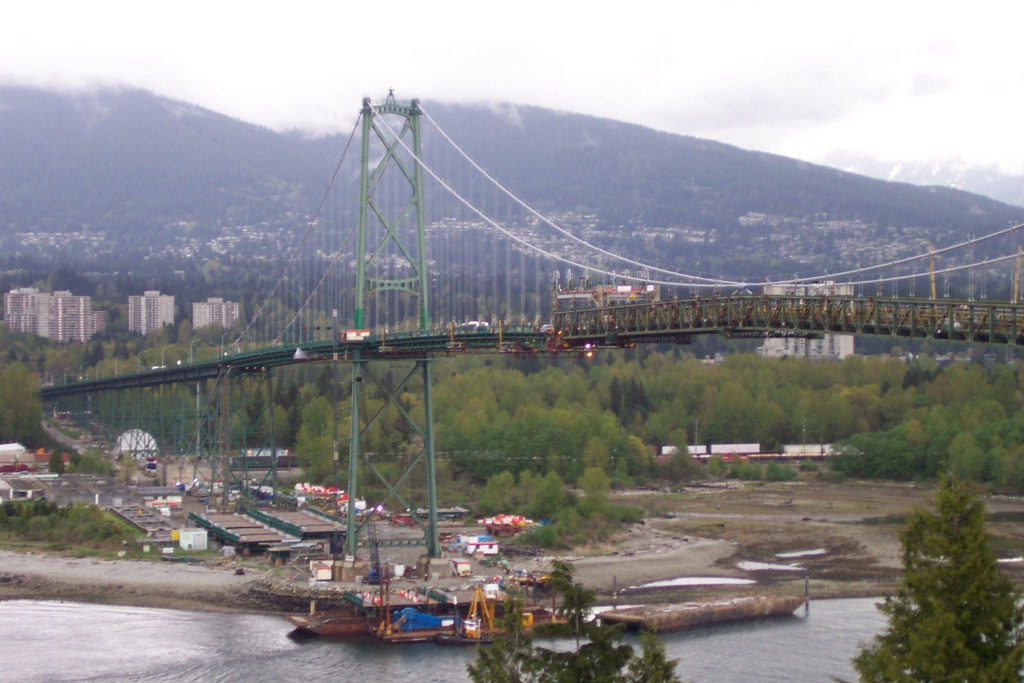
Lions Gate Bridge suspended structure replacement, April 2001

From September 2000 to September 2001, the replacement of the entire suspended structure of the original suspension bridge was undertaken without interruption of peak-hour traffic – the first time an entire suspended structure of a major suspension bridge was replaced while in daily use. As with the 1975 replacement work, this was facilitated by a series of separate nighttime and weekend closures to replace one section at a time. The old suspended section was lowered to a barge, and the new lighter and wider orthotropic deck section raised into place and connected. A total of 54 sections were used before being paved, instead of the 47 shown on the design drawings. The new deck was designed with the two pedestrian walkways cantilevered to the outside of the suspension cables and the three road lanes widened from 2.9 to 3.6 metres (10 to 12 ft) each. As a result of the 2001 replacement, the suspension bridge, which was described as "not designed for durability", had its lifespan extended.

In July 2009, the bridge's lighting system was updated with new LED lights to replace its system of 100-watt mercury vapour bulbs. The switch to LEDs was expected to reduce power consumption on the bridge by 90 percent and save the provincial government about $30,000 a year in energy and maintenance costs.

In 2020, a project to decrease the likelihood of a boat accident was completed.

In May 2022, a project to replace the lane control signals with new LED ones was completed.

In late 2023, the northern approach was repaved.

== In popular culture ==
- The bridge is the namesake of locally founded film company Lionsgate Films.
- It was featured as a set for the opening scene in the 2011 film Final Destination 5, known fictionally as the "North Bay Bridge".
- The bridge is featured in the background of the "Vancouver Velocity" course in Mario Kart Tour.
- The bridge is featured in the final scene of the 2010 movie Tron: Legacy with Sam riding his motorcycle across the bridge.
- The bridge is featured briefly in the 2018 movie Deadpool 2.
- The bridge is featured in the background in "The One That Got Away" Level in Marvel's Wolverine

== Gallery ==
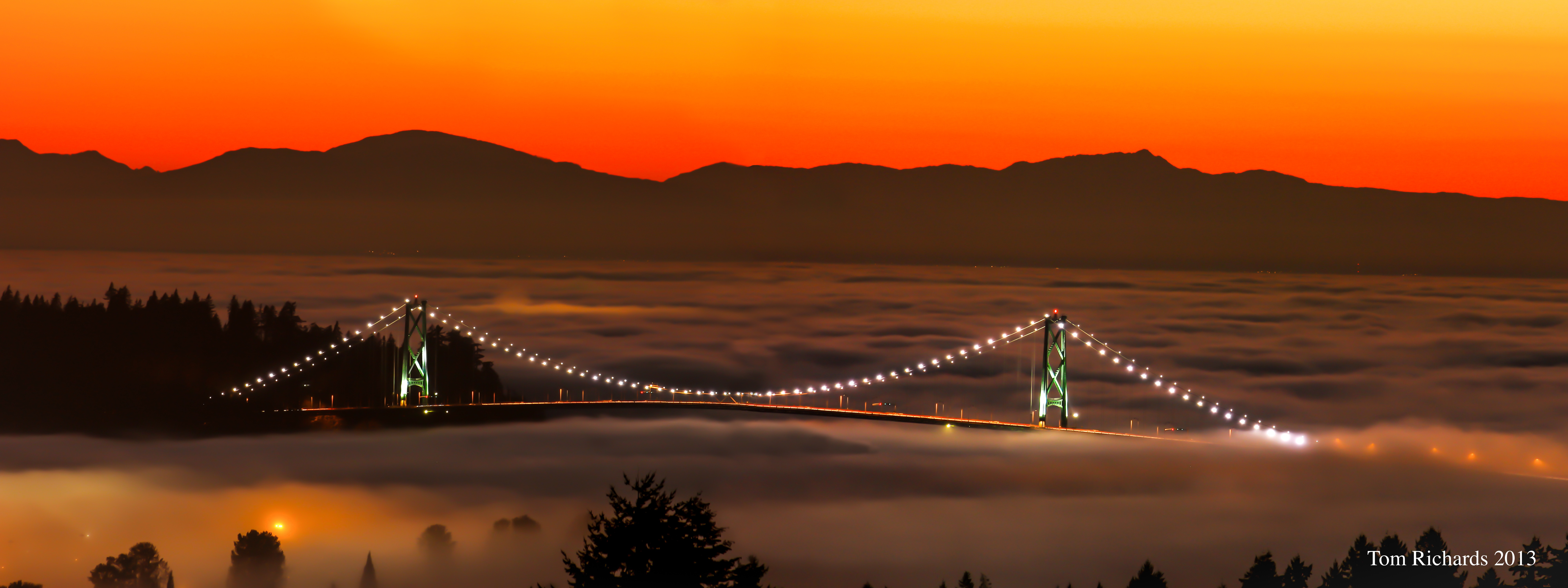
Lions Gate Bridge at Sunset, 2013

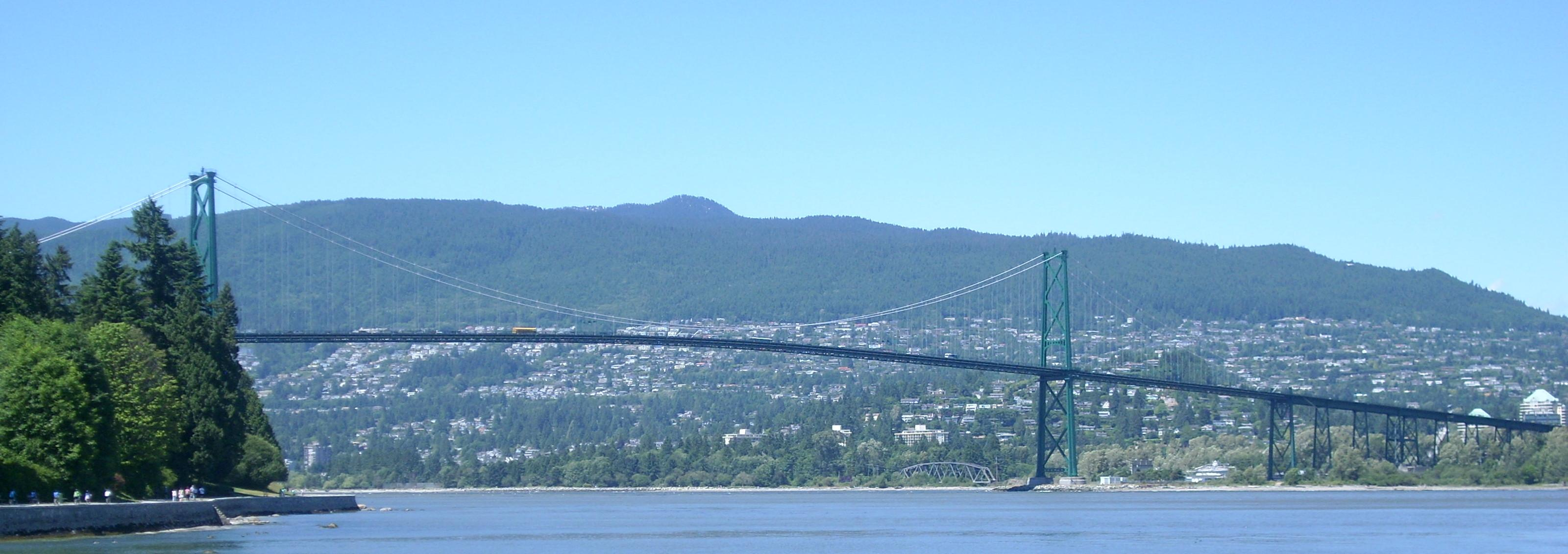
Lions Gate Bridge from downtown Vancouver

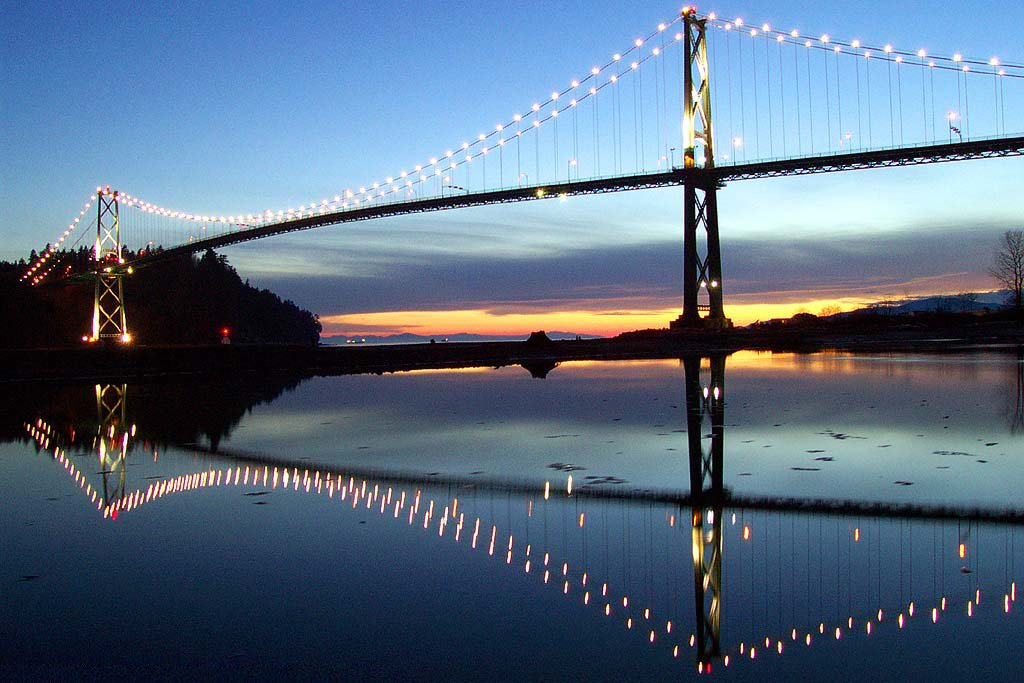
Tidepool reflection of the bridge, 2002

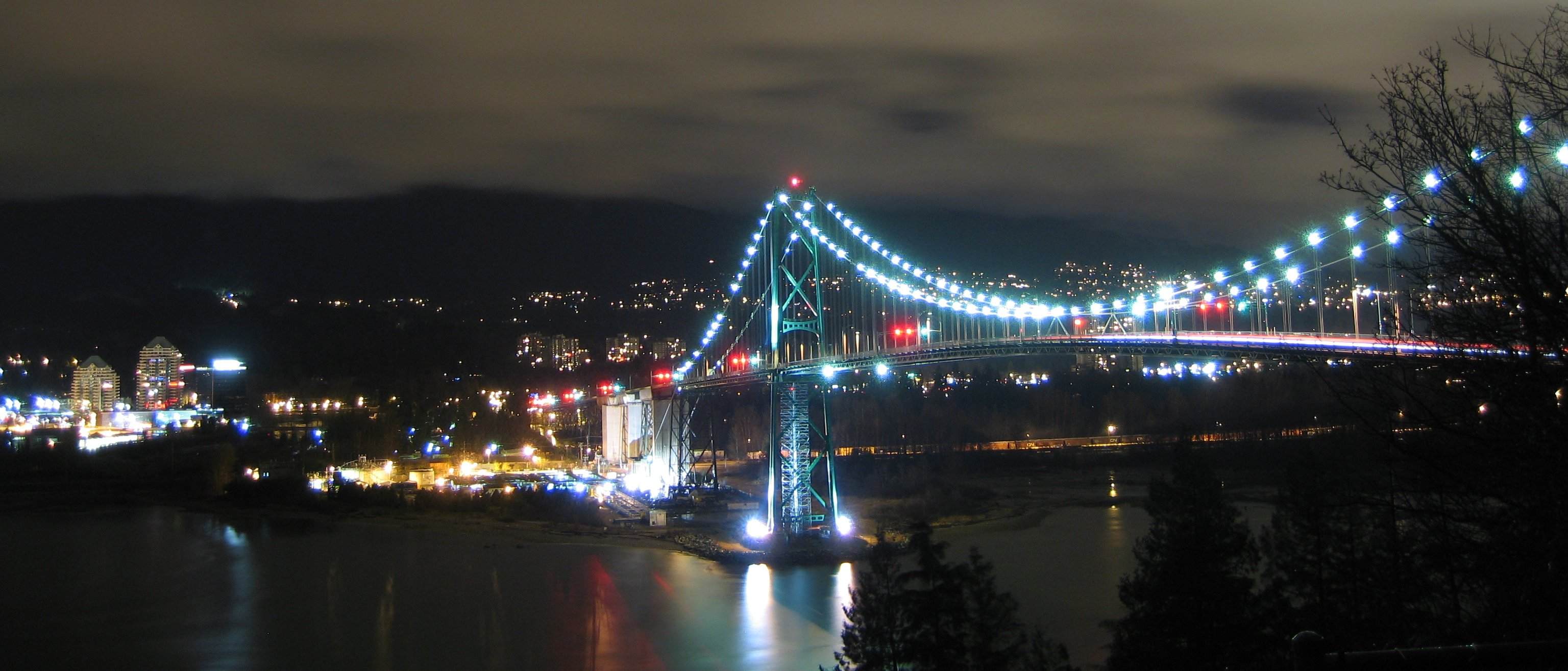
Lions Gate Bridge and North Vancouver from Prospect Point in Stanley Park

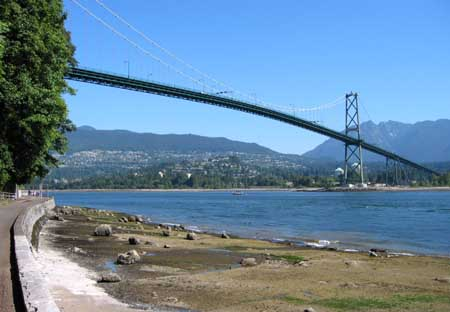
Lions Gate Bridge from Stanley Park, 2013

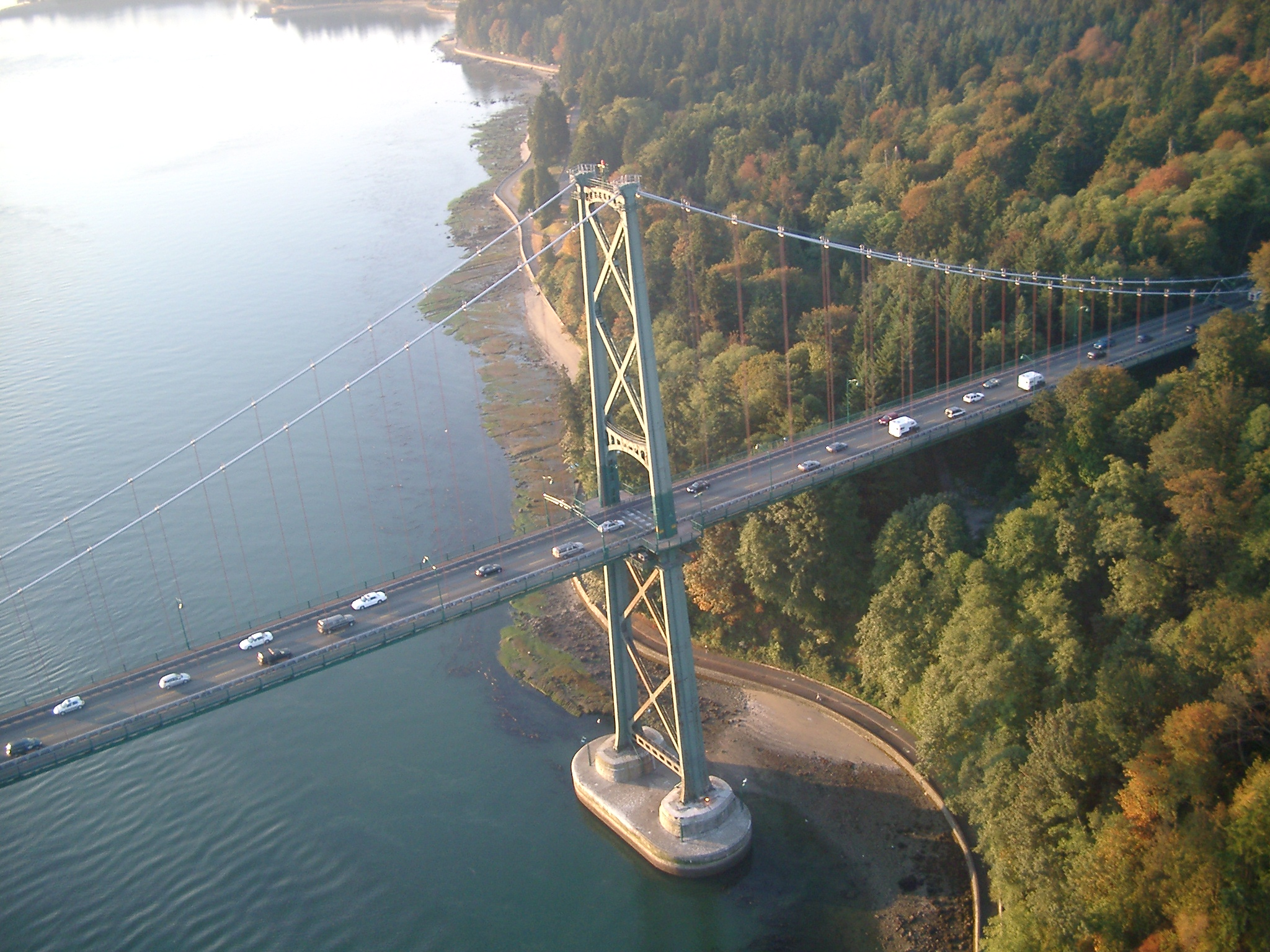
Lions Gate Bridge from floatplane

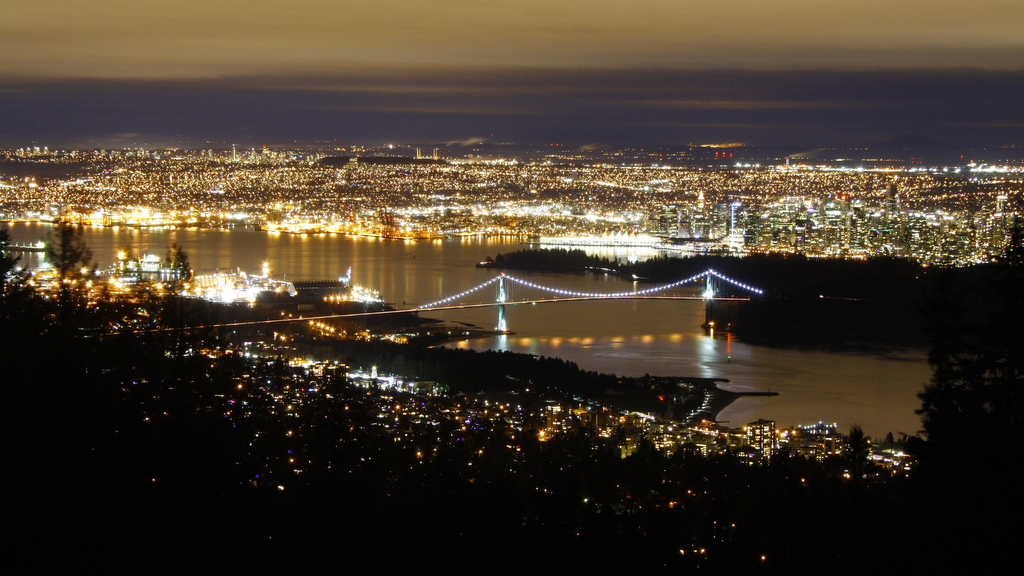
Lions Gate Bridge in relation to Vancouver city and harbour, from Cypress Viewpoint, Dec 2012

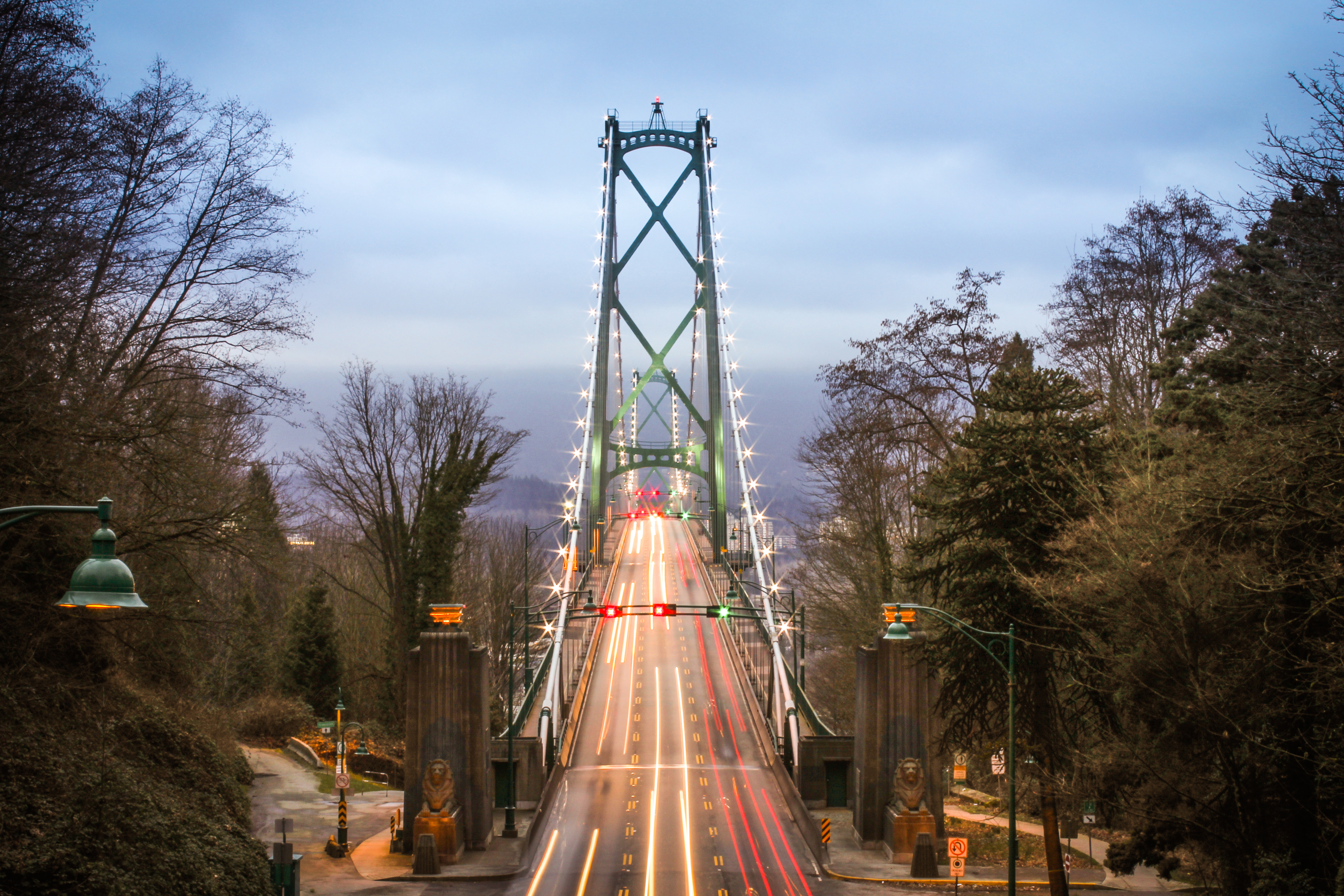
Lions Gate Bridge from Stanley Park, 2013

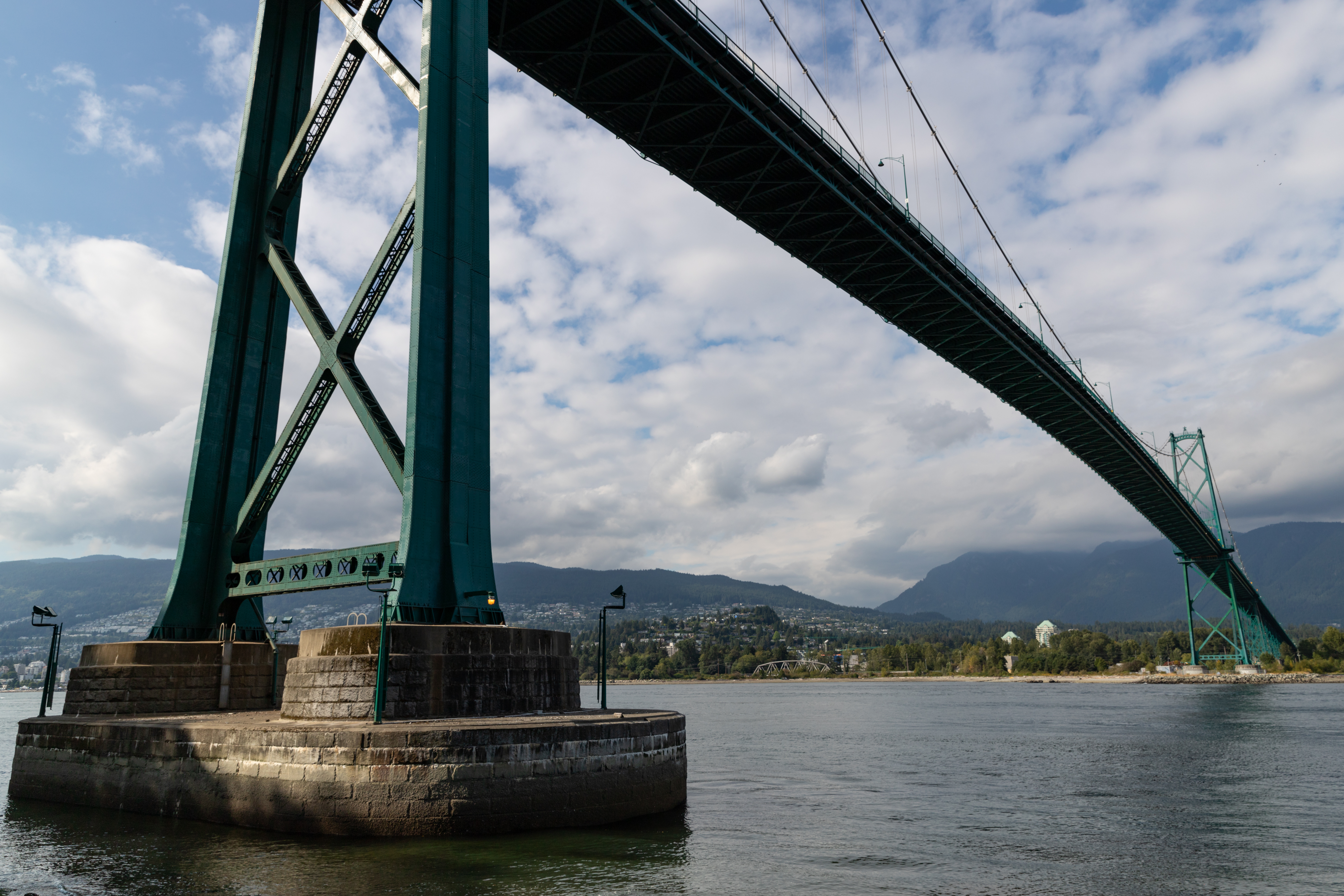
Lions Gate Bridge, Vancouver

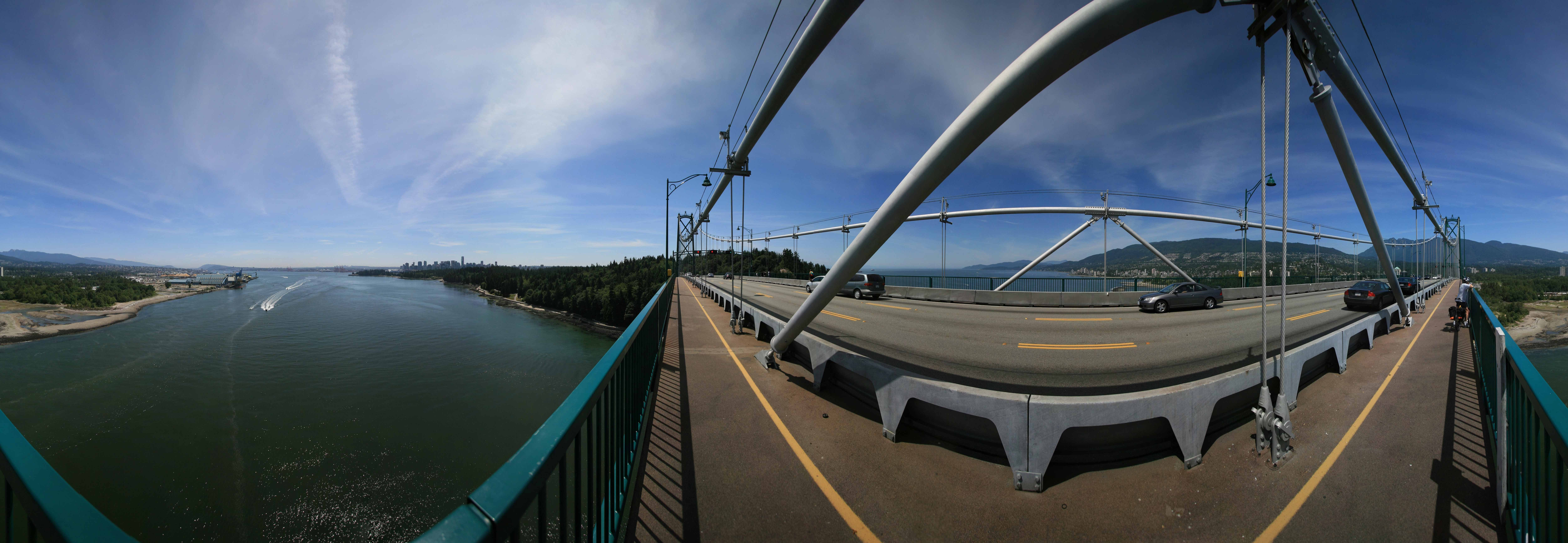
Lions Gate Bridge 360 panorama, 2009

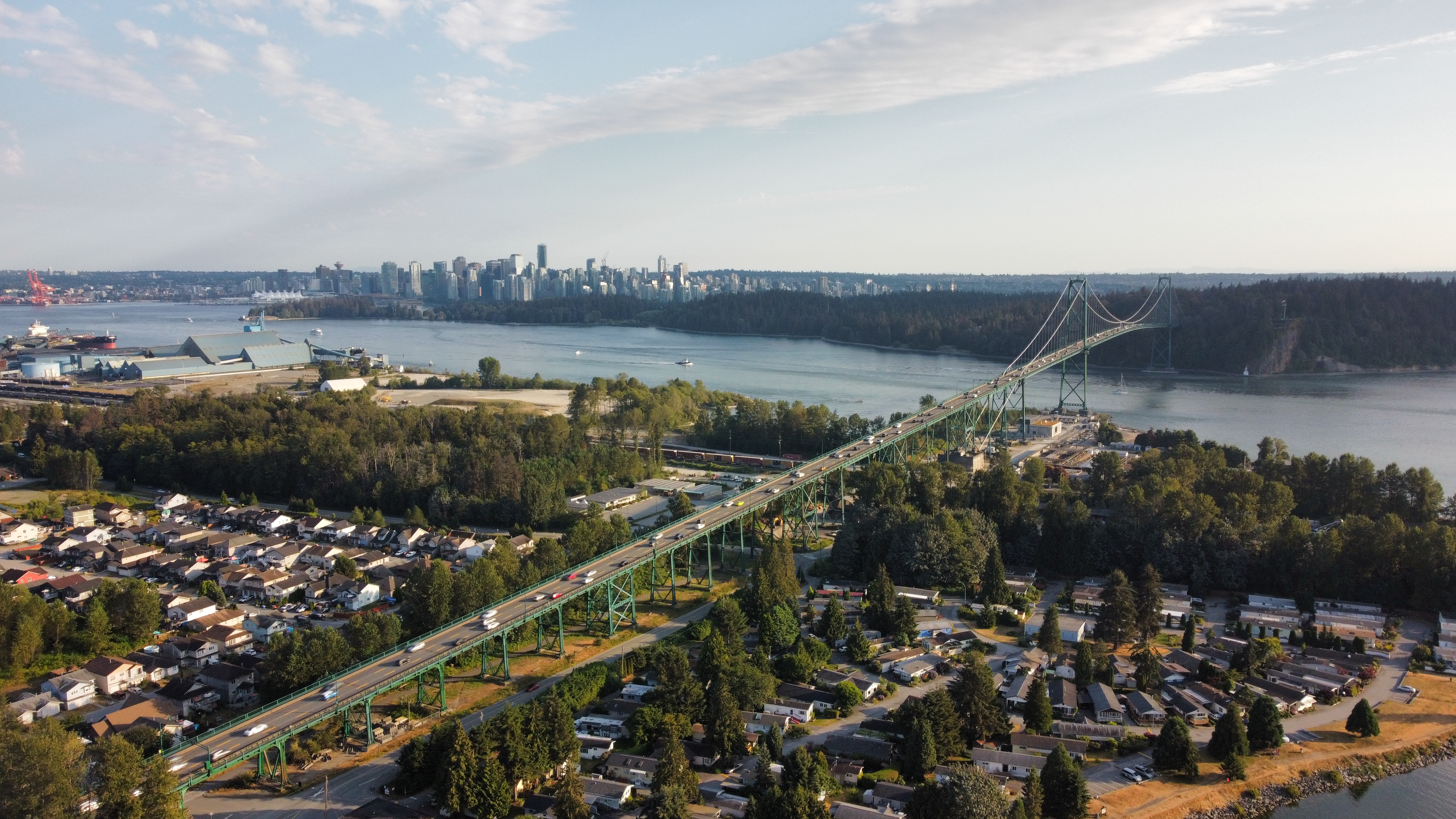
Lions Gate Bridge as seen from the North Shore with downtown Vancouver in the background, 2022

== See also ==
- 1946 Vancouver Island earthquake
- List of bridges in Canada
- Angus L. Macdonald Bridge, sister bridge
