= Dominion Government Ship =

Ship's designation

The designation Dominion Government Ship (DGS) was applied to ships operated by the Government of Canada in its early decades when it was more widely known by the deprecated name "Dominion of Canada." The later designation, Canadian Government Ship, was used as early as the turn of the 20th century.

Vessels designated DGS included:
image	name	commissioned	retired	notes
	DGS Kestrel			
	DGS Malaspina	1913	1946	Taken into the Royal Canadian Navy during World War I and World War II
	DGS Mastodon	1911	1934	retired in 1934, taken into the Royal Canadian Navy in World War II, and converted to a coastal oil tanker
	DGS Naden	1913	1922	Taken into the Royal Canadian Navy during World War I
	DGS Neptune			employed in 1903–1904, for an exploratory expedition to Canada's Arctic Archipelago
	DGS Quadra	1891		operated on the west coast
