= DGS Neptune =

Dominion government ship

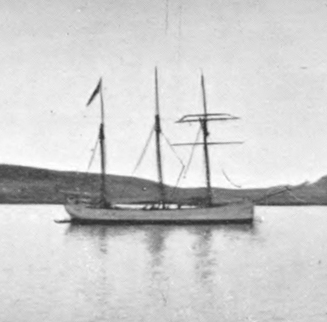
DGS Neptune moored in Kekerten Harbour, Cumberland Gulf.

DGS Neptune was a Dominion Government Ship dispatched on an expedition to Canada's Arctic Archipelago, in 1903–1904.

The expedition was led by Albert Peter Low, a geologist with experience in the north. The ship's complement included a seven-member detachment of North-West Mounted Police officers, under the command of Superintendent J.D. Moodie. The complement of 43 included several other scientists.

Prior to the expedition, Neptune was employed as a sealing vessel off Newfoundland and Labrador.
