= DGS Naden =

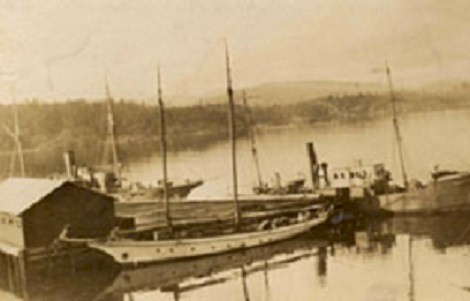
Naden was transferred to the RCN during WW1.

DGS Naden (later HMCS Naden) was a Dominion Government Ship built in British Columbia. She was purchased after she was designed, not purpose built. She was intended to serve as a tender and assist larger DGS vessels. However, she was purchased in 1913, shortly before the outbreak of World War I, and was transferred to the Royal Canadian Navy, eventually being employed as a training vessel for cadets at the Naval Academy in Esquimault.

In 1922 she was sold to a former officer, who ran a private school based on military lines, who continued to use it as a training vessel. In 1928 she was sold again, and became the yacht of a movie star.
