= West Vancouver Memorial Library =

Public library in British Columbia

- 49.3286°N 123.1653°W
- Location: West Vancouver, British Columbia, Canada
- Established: 1950
- Branches: 1

Collection
- Items collected: books, ebooks, cds, dvds, periodicals, digital photographs, local history, other
- Size: 300,000+

Access and use
- Circulation: 1,000,000
- Population served: 42,473
- Members: 37,000

Other information
- Budget: $4,649,708
- Director: Stephanie Hall
- Website: westvanlibrary.ca

The West Vancouver Memorial Library (WVML) is a public library that serves the district municipality of West Vancouver, British Columbia, Canada.

== Early history ==
The library was founded in 1950 as a memorial to honor those who gave their lives during World War II, with the aim of giving future generations the freedom to pursue knowledge without let or hindrance. Although West Vancouver Memorial Library did not officially open its doors until November 11, 1950, the District of West Vancouver had multiple small circulating libraries throughout the first half of the 20th century. As early as 1919, Mrs. Effie M. Field was loaning books from her dry goods and children's clothing store at 14th St. and Bellevue Ave; however, in 1921, the Hollyburn Public Library Association took over Mrs. Field's modest collection of books, with the intention of turning it into a municipally funded public library. By 1926, the library's collection grew to over 1,000 books, and after moving into George Gimmill's modern drug store at 1402 Marine Dr., the library was able to expand even further.

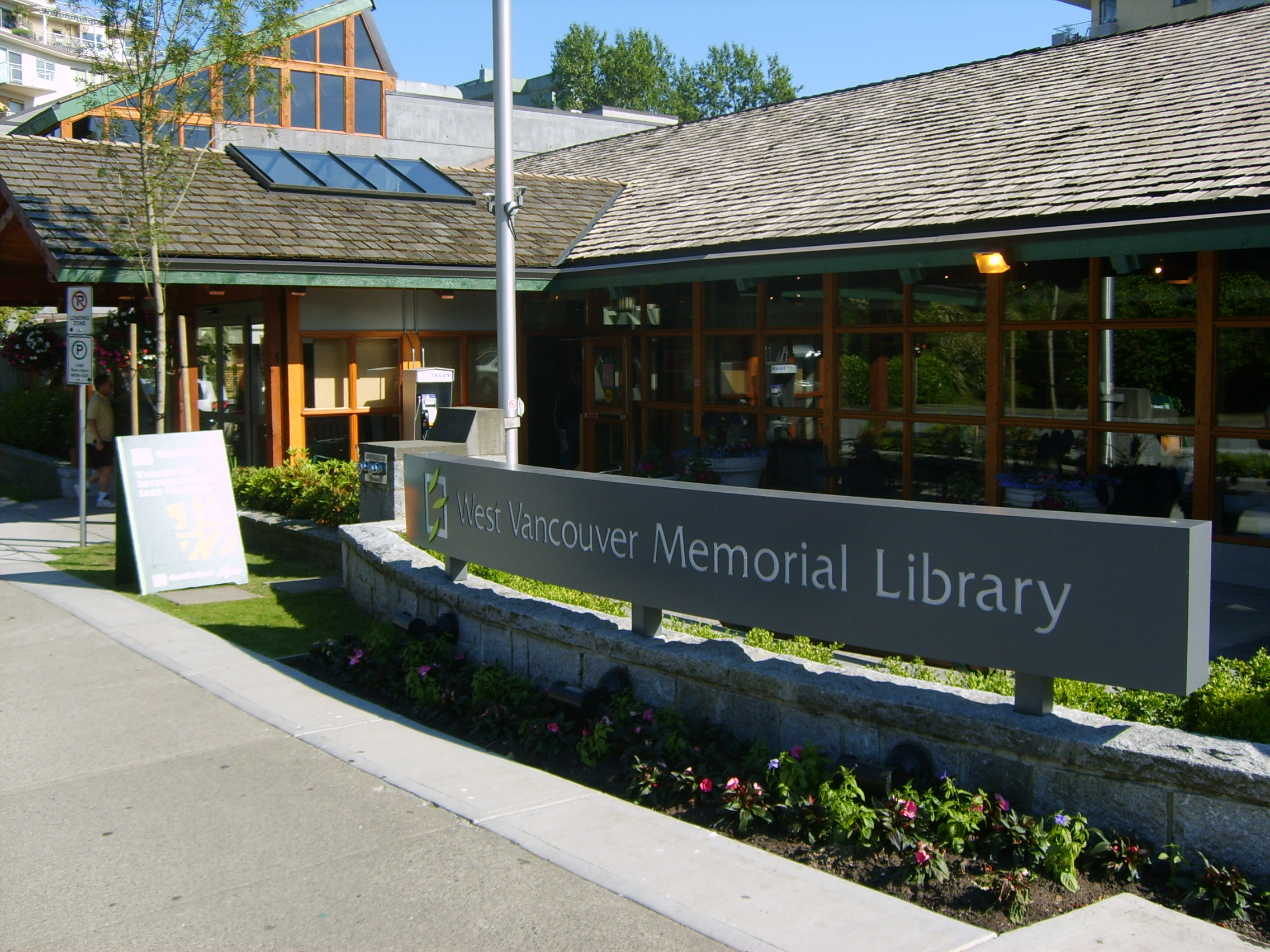
West Vancouver Memorial Library

Harsh economic times during the 1930's led to sharp reductions in provincial funding, and in 1933, the library was officially closed. West Vancouver residents were deeply affected by the Great Depression, although throughout the latter half of the decade, there was a proliferation of small private lending libraries in a number of stationery and gift shops.

With the onset of the Second World War, the economy of West Vancouver was centered on the War effort, along with the rest of Canada, but by the summer of 1944, a petition requesting the establishment of a municipal public library was presented to West Vancouver Municipal Council. On December 16, the by-law was approved, and shortly after the end of the War, the municipality voted that a library be constructed as a War Memorial.

== Later history ==
Designed by West Vancouver architect R. A. D. Berwick, the library was opened on November 11, 1950 with Elizabeth Musto as the library's first official librarian. Shortly thereafter, a stained glass window was generously donated to the library, featuring a reproduction of a painting by Sir Frank Bernard Dicksee entitled "Harmony". The window was created by Master craftsman John Henry Dearle. West Vancouver Memorial Library was only narrowly voted in as the municipality's official War Memorial; second (by only one vote) was a Civic Center. Other possibilities included a hospital, a swimming pool, a chapel, a town clock, and a community gymnasium. The library is situated in the 1900 block of Marine Dr., and since it was officially opened in the year 1950, it was given the street number 1950 by the municipality.

Since the end of the War, West Vancouver's population had risen steadily, and after just five years of being open, the library was circulating 12.76 books per capital. In 1957, Weekend Magazine published a photostory about West Vancouver Memorial Library entitled "North America's Busiest Library", and in 1960, The Vancouver Sun also proclaimed that the library was the "Most Busy Library in Canada".

== Collections ==
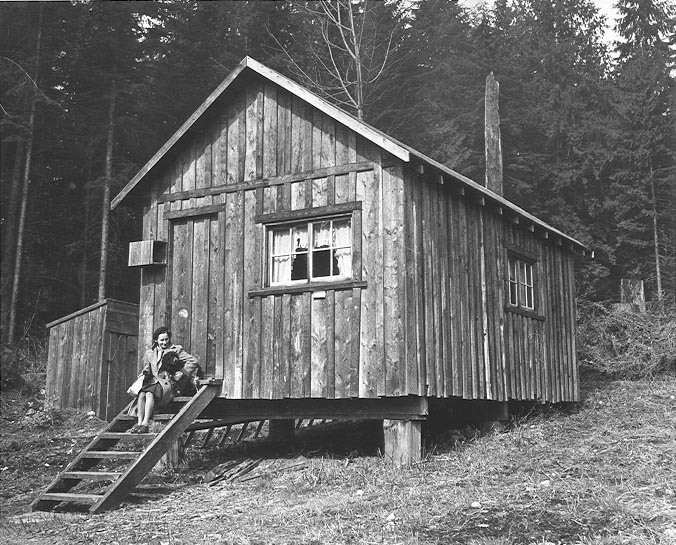
A cabin at 15th St. and Ottawa Ave. in 1942. From the William Mcphee collection.

West Vancouver Memorial Library's collection of materials includes books, DVDs, CD-ROMs, historical photographs, microfilm, microfiche, newspapers, and magazines, along with a fairly extensive offering of CD's.

The library has a number of multilingual materials including those in Chinese, Tagalog, Japanese, Spanish, Korean, French, and Persian. With more than 2,500 books, West Vancouver Memorial Library has the largest and most comprehensive Persian collection in British Columbia.

The library also has a number of specialized databases including those associated with Business, Citizenship, Consumer Information, Education, Genealogy, Health & Medicine, History, Language & Literature, Law, Music, Religion & Philosophy, Science & Technology, and Statistics.

== Art ==
The Art Gallery at the West Vancouver Memorial Library features rotating exhibitions by emerging artists. The Library also has a permanent art collection.

== Music ==
Through a bequest from Robert Leslie Welsh, the West Vancouver Memorial Library has been able to offer a number of music-related programs, materials, and technologies for the general public.

Friday Night Concert Series at West Vancouver Memorial Library

The Library's Friday Night Concert Series features live music; concerts are free and open to all.

A collection of CDs is also available at the library, along with classical and popular music performances on DVD, a collection of music books and scores, an orchestra scores collection, and streaming music.

== Friends of the Library ==
West Vancouver Memorial Library has been strongly supported by its Friends of the Library since 1950. The Friends are active volunteers and supporters working together to enrich the library programs, collections and services. Their efforts focus on fundraising projects and hospitality.
