= British Properties =

Neighbourhood of West Vancouver, British Columbia

- Neighbourhood
- Location in Metro Vancouver
- Coordinates: 49°21′00″N 123°08′00″W
- Country: Canada
- Province: British Columbia
- Region: Lower Mainland
- Regional district: Metro Vancouver
- Established: 1931

Area
  - Total: 1,600 ha (4,000 acres)
- Website: www.britishproperties.com

Originally known as Capilano Estates, the British Properties is a residential area in West Vancouver, British Columbia, Canada. The 4,000-acre area was sold by the municipality of West Vancouver to the British Pacific Properties Corporation in 1931, which continues to develop the land to the present day.

The development is credited with starting West Vancouver's slow transformation from a ferry-access only, resort-style beachside enclave into a leafy suburban community with roads, parks, and shopping centres.

== History ==
In 1931, the British Pacific Properties, a corporation consisting of a group of investors led by the Guinness brewing company, acquired 4,000 acres of land from the municipality of West Vancouver stretching from the Capilano River to Horseshoe Bay. The land was purchased during the Great Depression, when the municipality was nearing bankruptcy due to residents being unable to pay property taxes. The Guinness family, led by Walter Guinness committed to funding $1 million in local improvements over a five-year period and constructing the Lions Gate Bridge. The corporation ended up paying $75,000 to the municipality for the land with the agreement of $1 million in improvements.

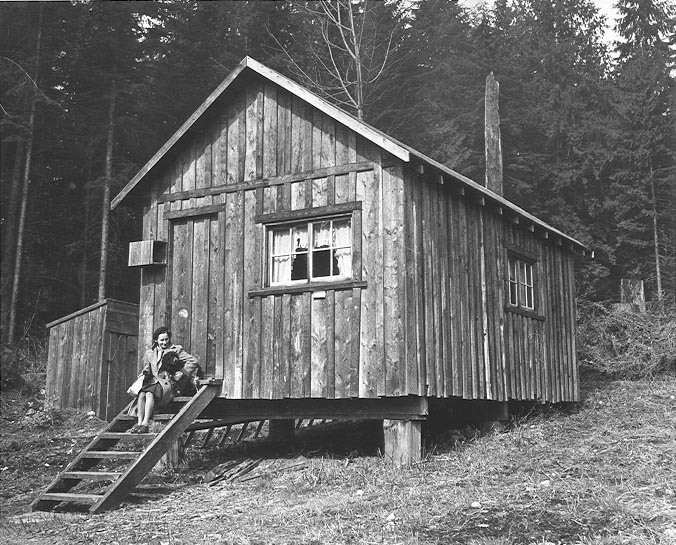
A cabin at 15th St. and Ottawa Ave. in 1942. Photo by William Mcphee

The original landscaping was designed by the prestigious Olmsted Brothers landscape architecture firm from Boston. Olmsted Brothers was founded by Frederick Law Olmsted—the father of North American landscape architecture and the creator of Central Park in Manhattan, Mount Royal in Montreal, and the innovative Riverside suburb in West Chicago.

The majority of residential development took place between 1955 and 1985 with some development prior and after this time period.

British Properties is often compared to the Hollywood and Beverly Hills in California.

== Ethnic restrictions ==
The neighbourhood was known for its strict whites-only policy. Property titles including covenants such as barring sales to "any person or persons of African or Asiatic race or of African or Asiatic descent." Jewish people were also excluded, although, eventually, the first synagogue in West Vancouver was built opposite the entrance to the British Properties. In modern times, the resident population is diverse due to the property values and other factors attracting Asian and other international investors. It is said that residents are just as likely to speak Persian or Mandarin as they are to speak English.
