= West Vancouver =

West Vancouver West Van
- District municipality
- The Corporation of the District of West Vancouver
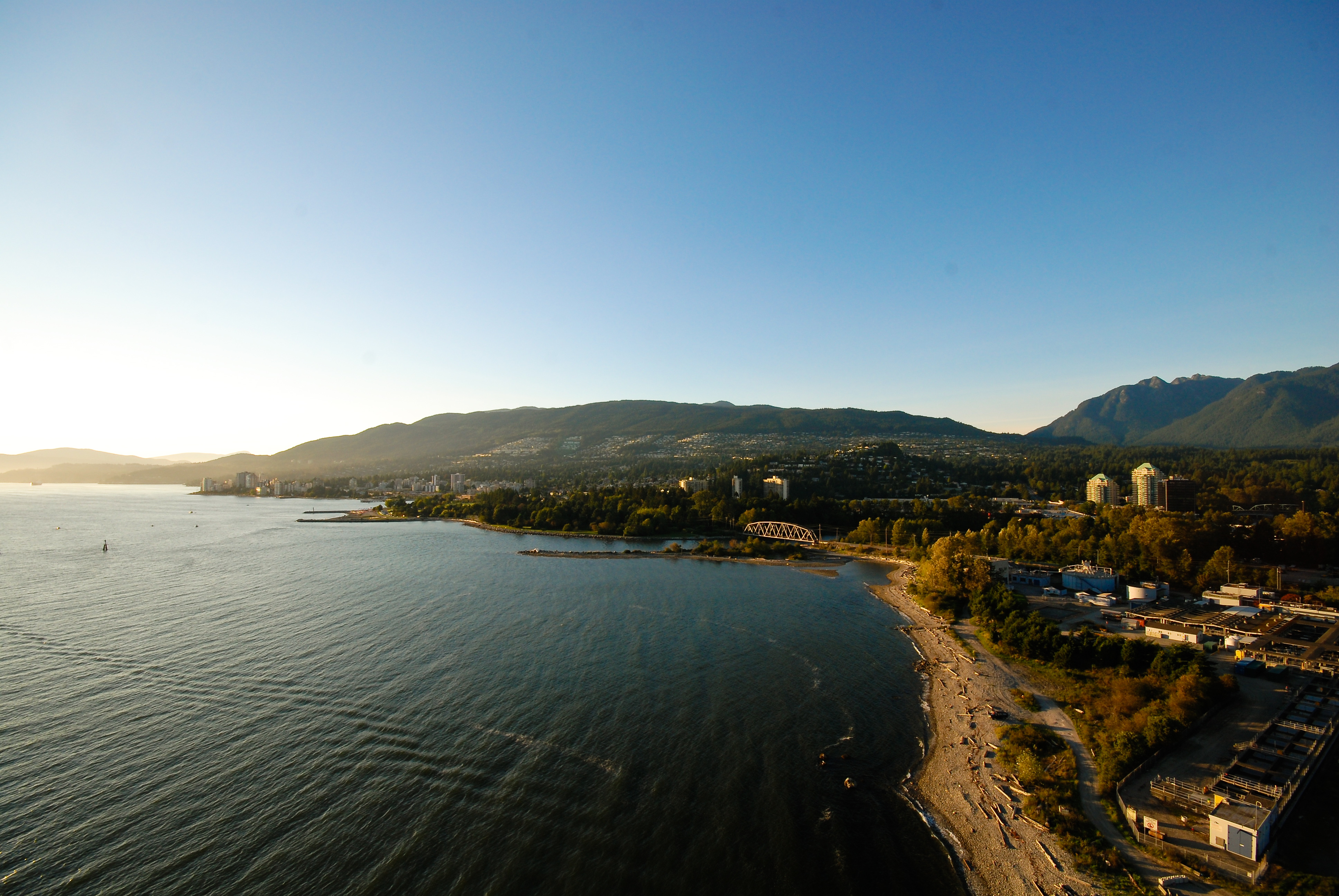
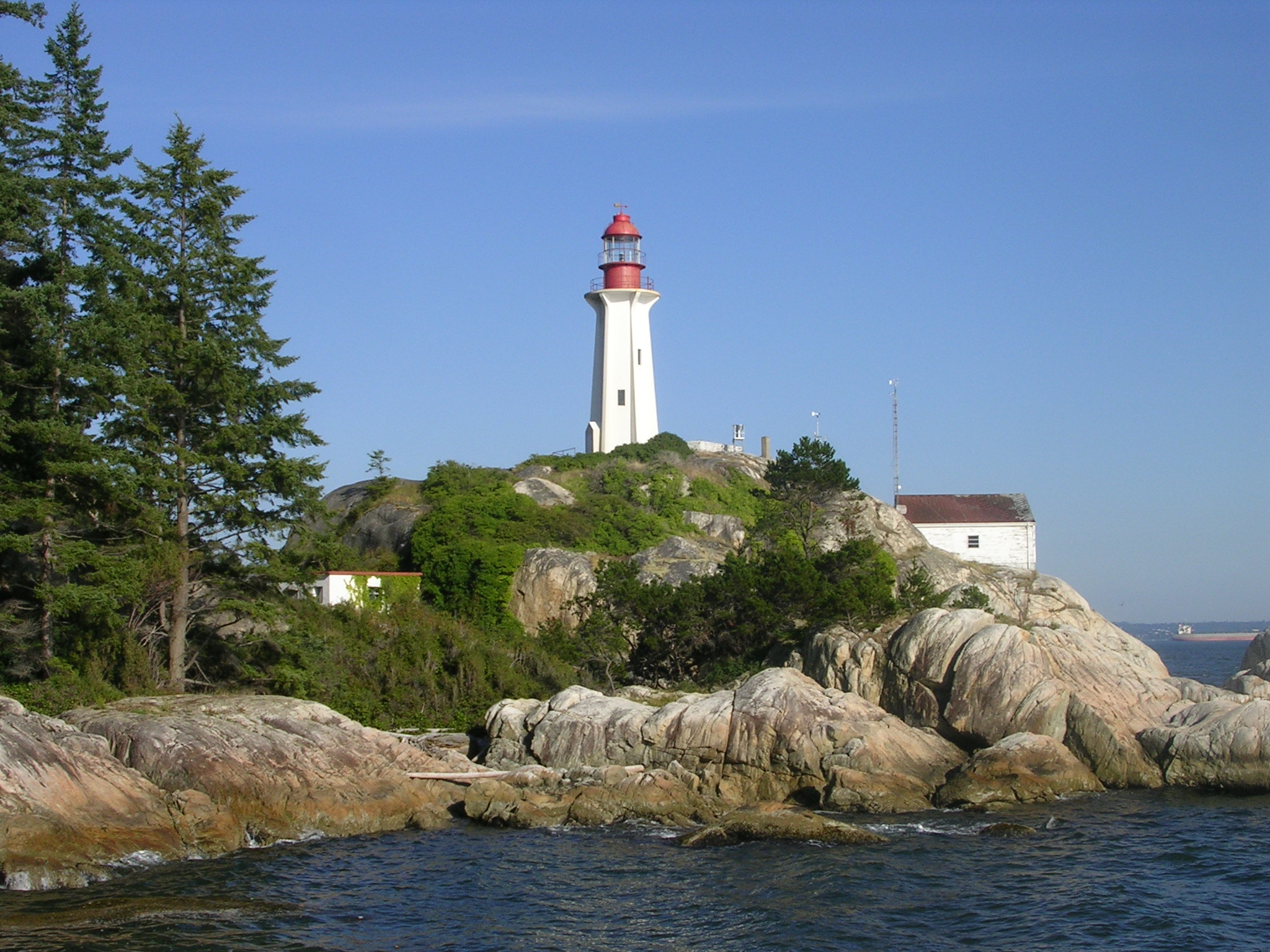
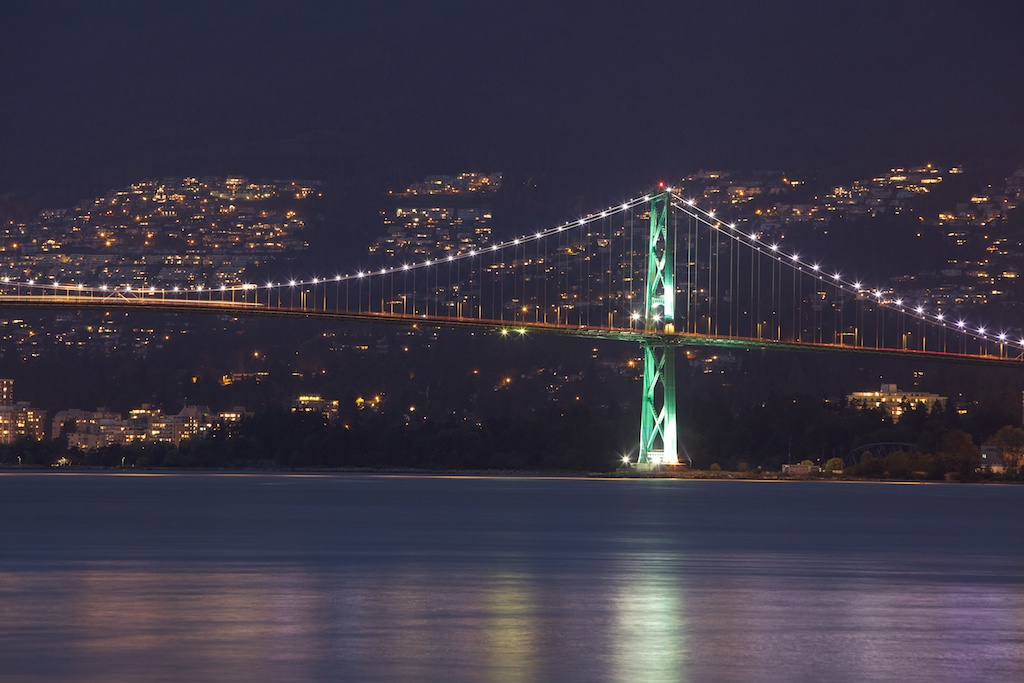
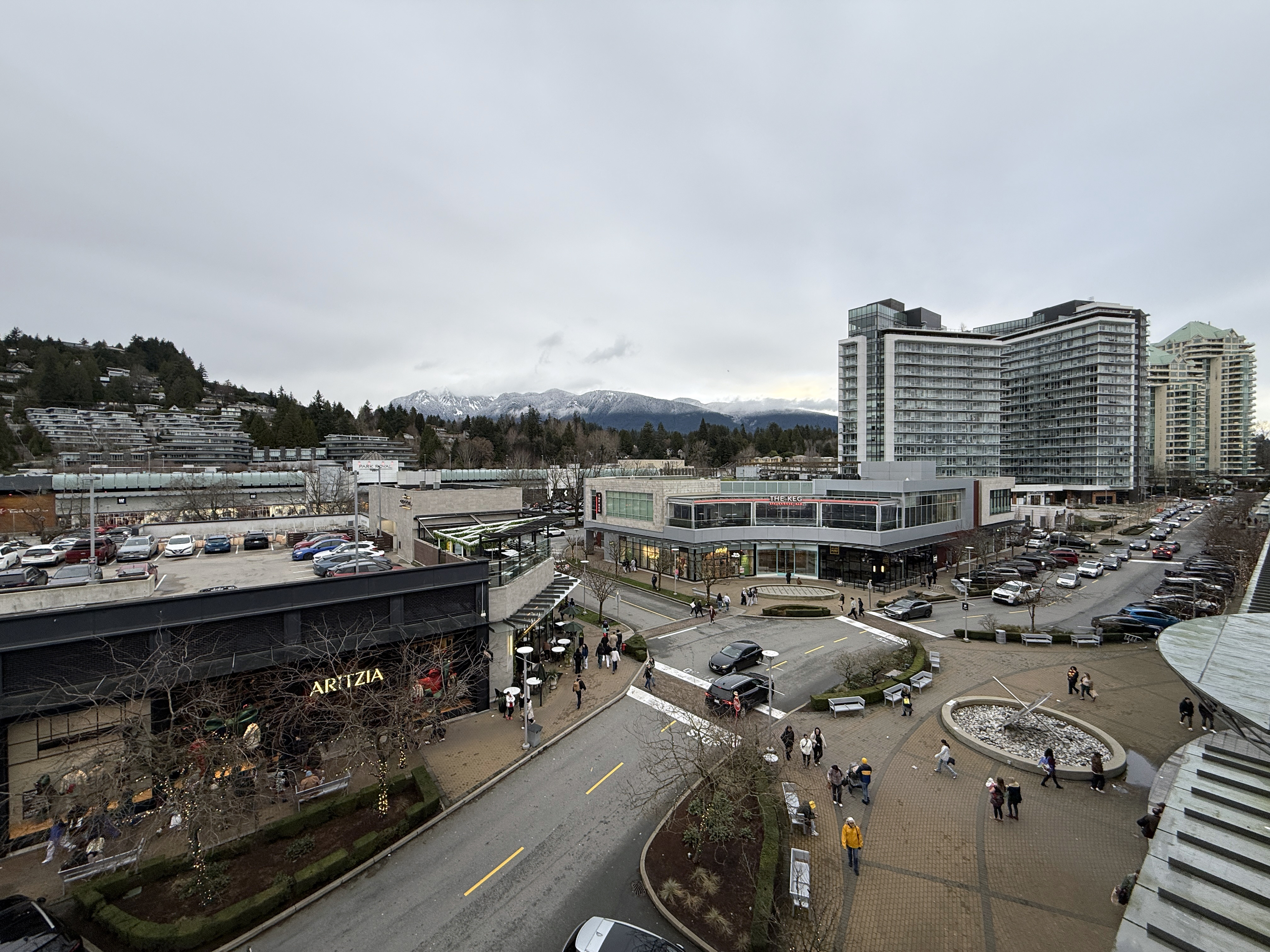
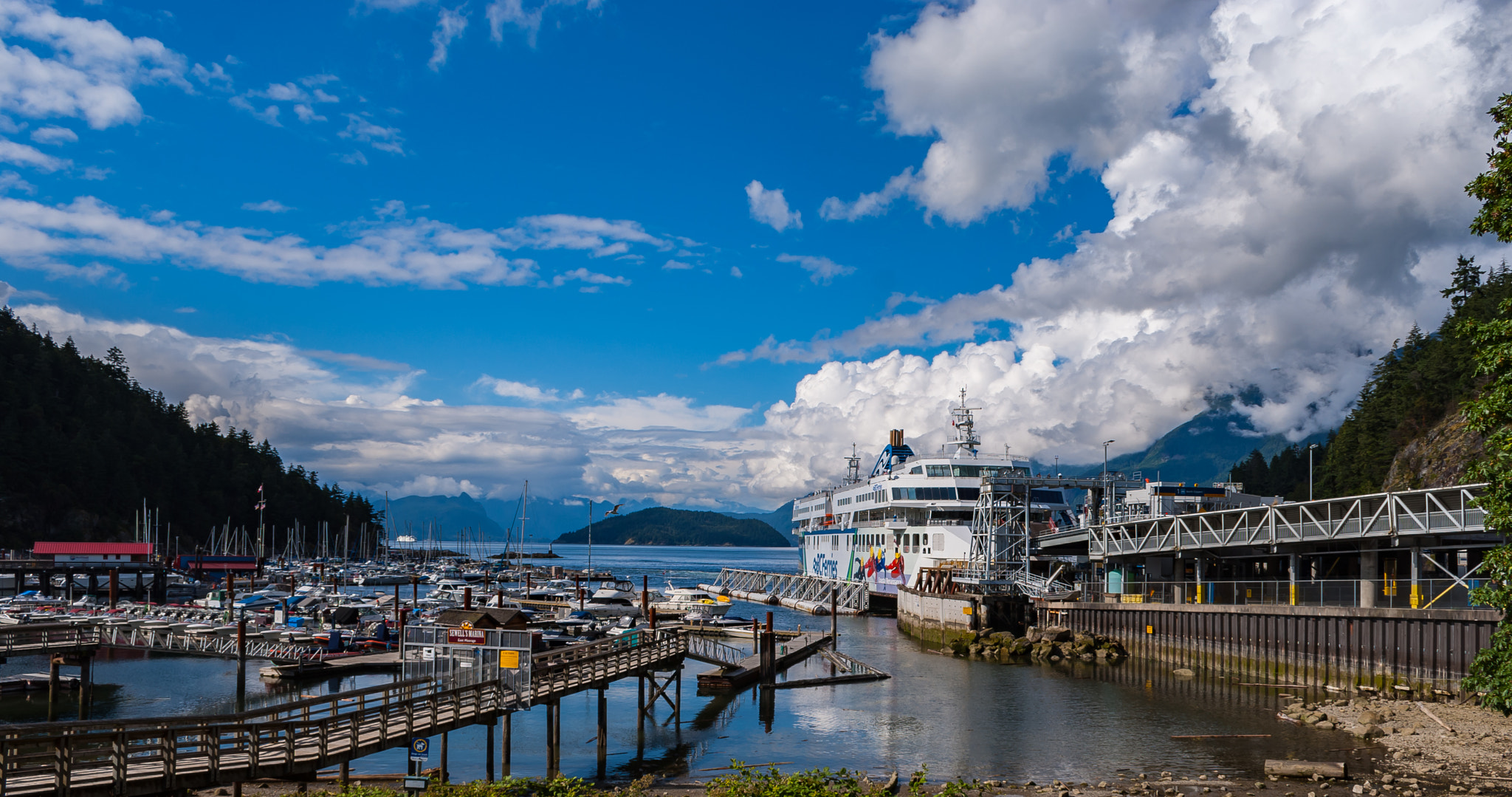
- Ambleside Lighthouse Park Lions Gate Bridge Park Royal Horseshoe Bay

- Flag Coat of Arms Banner of Arms
- Nickname: West Van
- Motto: "Consilio et animis" (English: "By wisdom and courage")
- Location of West Vancouver in Metro Vancouver
- Coordinates: 49°22′0″N 123°10′0″W
- Country: Canada
- Province: British Columbia
- Regional district: Metro Vancouver
- Incorporated: March 15, 1912

Government
  - Type: Mayor-council government
  - Body: West Vancouver Council
  - Mayor: Kirk LaPointe
  - Council: List of councillors: Linda Watt; Scott Snider; Peter Lambur; Christine Cassidy; Sharon Thompson; Gambioli Nora
  - MLA: Caroline Elliott (West Vancouver-Capilano; BC Con.); Jeremy Valeriote (West Vancouver-Sea to Sky; BC Green)
  - MP: Patrick Weiler (Lib.)

Area
  - Land: 87.18 km^{2} (33.66 sq mi)
- Highest elevation (Mt Strachan): 1,440 m (4,720 ft)
- Lowest elevation: 0 m (0 ft)

Population (2021)
  - Total: 44,122
  - Estimate (2023): 46,358
  - Density: 506.1/km^{2} (1,311/sq mi)
- Demonym: West Vancouverite
- Time zone: UTC−07:00 (Pacific Time)
- Forward sortation area: V7S–V7W
- Area codes: 604, 778, 236, 672
- Website: westvancouver.ca

West Vancouver (also West Van) is a district municipality in the province of British Columbia, Canada. A member municipality of the Metro Vancouver Regional District, West Vancouver is situated on the north shore of Burrard Inlet to the northwest of the city of Vancouver. With the District of North Vancouver and the City of North Vancouver, West Vancouver is part of a regional grouping known as the North Shore municipalities. It is among the wealthiest municipalities in Canada by average household net worth.

West Vancouver is home to the Horseshoe Bay ferry terminal, one of the main transportation hubs connecting the British Columbia mainland and Vancouver Island, and to much of Cypress Provincial Park.

== History ==
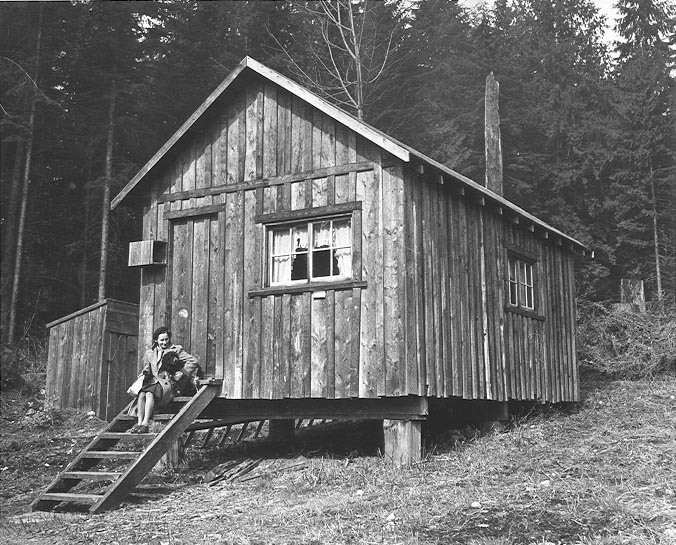
A cabin at 15th St. and Ottawa Ave. in 1942

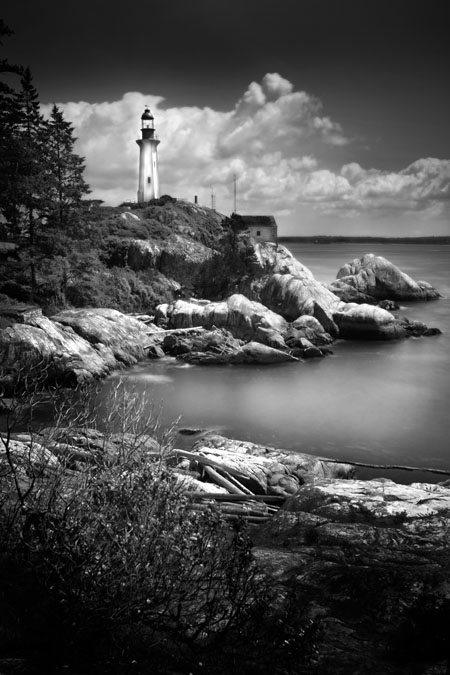
Lighthouse at Point Atkinson

The Municipality of West Vancouver was incorporated on March 15, 1912, after separating from the District of North Vancouver. The first municipal election was held on April 6, 1912. In November 1938, the Lions Gate Bridge was opened to traffic, allowing extensive growth of the semi-populated community, previously only accessible by ferry. Some homes in West Vancouver date back to the 1920s and 30s, though most of the currently existing dwellings were built in the 1970s and 80s, and mostly in British Pacific Properties' developments.

=== Timeline ===
- 1792: Captain George Vancouver names Point Atkinson
- 1866: John Thomas, known as "Navvy Jack", sailed from England or Wales, arriving in Burrard Inlet, in about 1866. He was the first white resident of West Vancouver, offered first ferry service to what be known as Vancouver in a rowboat. His house still stands today at Ambleside and there is a Navvy Jack Point. Thomas' nickname Navvy Jack today remains used in British Columbia English to mean washed pea gravel used in construction and landscaping trades, as he was the original supplier of the material to Vancouver and mined it from coves in West Vancouver.
- 1872: James Blake preempted the first 65 hectares (160 acres) of land
- 1875: First lighthouse at Point Atkinson
- 1898: Mr. Francis Caulfeild was put ashore at Skunk Cove
- 1905: John Lawson, a local leader settled at foot of 17th street
- 1908: First pier, Hollyburn Pier
- 1909:
  - West Vancouver Transportation Company was formed, provides ferry service across harbour to Vancouver
  - "Real estate boom" lots sold for as little as $450 and as much as $4,500
- 1910: Water systems started at Caulfeild and Ambleside
- 1911: First primary school, Presbyterian Church at Dundarave
- 1912:
  - West Vancouver separated from the District Municipality of North Vancouver and incorporated on March 15, 1912.
  - Population was approximately 1,500 people
  - First municipal election
  - Council appointed John Teare as the first police constable on May 17. F.H. Kettle was appointed the second constable on May 28
  - West Vancouver Transit System opens for public use
- 1913: Hollyburn Elementary School structure built, facility of the longest existing school in West Vancouver
- 1914:
  - First known settlement, the Coast Salish village at Sandy Cove
  - Pacific Great Eastern Railway in service from North Vancouver to Caulfeild and Horseshoe Bay
  - Colonel Albert Whyte pressed for a spelling change from White Cliff City to Whytecliff
- 1915:
  - Dundarave Pier built
  - Marine Drive was officially opened by Premier Richard McBride
- 1922: British Columbia Electric Railway starts electrical service
- 1923: Adopted STV for city elections (discontinued in 1930)
- 1924: House numbering scheme started
- 1926:
  - Marine Drive extended to Horseshoe Bay
  - Town Planning Act banned any new industry forming an exclusively residential community with minimum lot sizes
- 1927: Inglewood High School built
- 1928: Direct telephone service to Vancouver operational
- 1930:
  - Septic tanks made mandatory
  - Only 48 of West Vancouver's 100 kilometres of roads paved
- 1931: Dan Sewell opened his marina and the Whytecliff Lodge
- 1932: 650 hectares (1,600 acres) of land bought by A.R. Guinness-Br. Pacific Properties for $50 a hectare, they have been developed as the British Properties
- 1934: First police car and the official opening of Inglewood Junior Highschool
- 1936: Hollyburn Post Office built at 17th street and Marine Drive
- 1938: Lions Gate Bridge finished, opened to foot traffic on November 12 and cars on November 14. The bridge cost a total of $6 million to build. It was financed by the Guinness family, in conjunction with the development and marketing of the British Properties.
- 1939: Official opening ceremony of the Lions Gate Bridge on May 26; King George VI and Queen Elizabeth cross it on May 29.
- 1947: Ferry service stopped due to lack of demand after bridge constructed
- 1950:
  - West Vancouver Memorial Library opened on November 11 (Remembrance Day)
  - Park Royal Shopping Centre, Canada's first shopping centre opened
- 1951: Hollyburn Mountain opens first chairlift
- 1954: Public Safety Building opened. It housed the West Vancouver Police and Fire Departments
- 1959: Rezoning allowed 78 apartment buildings in Ambleside
- 1961: The Crescent Apartments, West Vancouver's first high rise apartment, opened
- 1963: Tolls on Lions Gate Bridge lifted on April 1
- 1967: Fire hall was built and opened on November 22, 1967, at 16th and Fulton Ave. The police department remained in the Public Safety building.
- 1973: Clyde McRae completes a world record walk across Canada on Ambleside Beach.

== Facilities ==
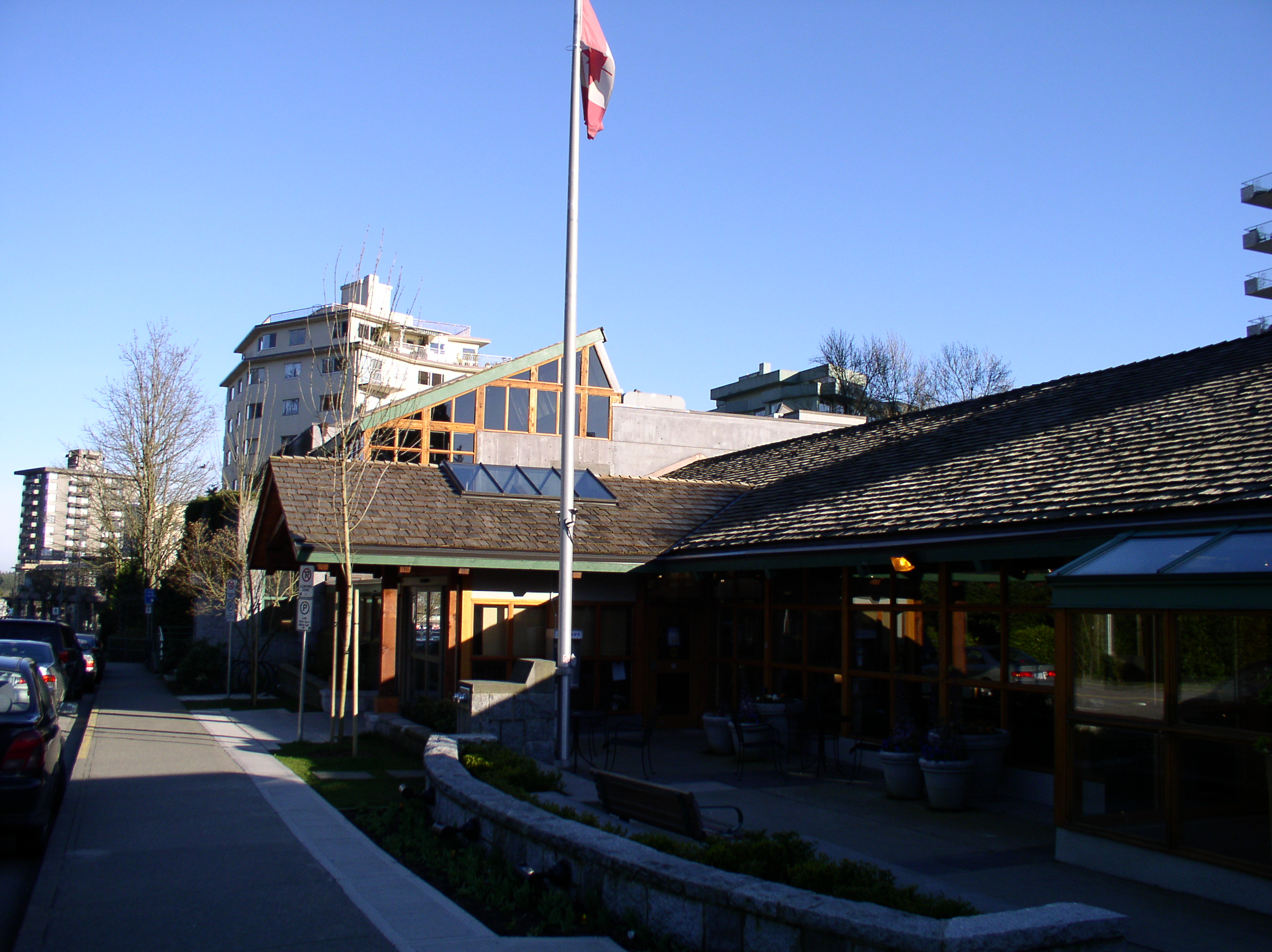
West Vancouver Memorial Library

West Vancouver is mainly a residential district as many residents are retired, work at home, or take the short commute to downtown Vancouver.

A 13-block strip of Marine Drive serves as a commercial district, featuring shops, small offices, garages and gas stations, restaurants, banks, and other common amenities. The area between 13th and 19th Streets is commonly known as Ambleside Village, and the area between 24th and 26th Streets is known as the village of Dundarave. This commercial area is served by the Ambleside Dundarave Business Improvement Association.

West Vancouver is also home to Park Royal Shopping Centre, Canada's first mall. Opened in the 1950s, it now consumes 2 kilometres (1.2 mi) of both sides of Marine Drive near North Vancouver. Park Royal is the second largest mall in British Columbia, after Metropolis at Metrotown in Burnaby. Located nearby is a major bus terminal for Blue Bus and North Vancouver TransLink buses.

The West Vancouver Memorial Library, located in Ambleside, has a circulation rate of 21.32 per capita, the highest circulation rate per capita in Canada.

== Demographics ==
At the 2021 Canadian census conducted by Statistics Canada, West Vancouver had a population of 44,122 living in 17,690 of its 18,795 total private dwellings, a change of 3.9% from its 2016 population of 42,473. With a land area of 87.18 km^{2} (33.66 sq mi), it had a population density of 506.1/km^{2} (1,310.8/sq mi) in 2021.

West Vancouver has the second highest percentage of persons aged 65 or older in BC with 22% of persons fitting into the category, compared with 13% for the rest of the province. The top five professions in West Vancouver are professional science and technical services; retail trade; health care; finance and insurance; and educational services. A large portion of the population is involved in senior management in comparison with the rest of the province.

=== Ethnicity ===
Panethnic groups in West Vancouver (2001–2021)
Panethnic group	2021		2016		2011		2006		2001	
Panethnic group	Pop.	%	Pop.	%	Pop.	%	Pop.	%	Pop.	%
European (Note: Statistic includes all persons that did not make up part of a visible minority or an indigenous identity.)	24,195	55.77%	26,285	63.06%	29,910	71.14%	31,960	76.78%	32,475	79.48%
East Asian (Note: Statistic includes total responses of "Chinese", "Korean", and "Japanese" under visible minority section on census.)	9,990	23.03%	8,970	21.52%	5,870	13.96%	5,025	12.07%	4,755	11.64%
Middle Eastern (Note: Statistic includes total responses of "West Asian" and "Arab" under visible minority section on census.)	5,310	12.24%	3,915	9.39%	3,445	8.19%	2,480	5.96%	2,055	5.03%
South Asian	1,405	3.24%	975	2.34%	1,040	2.47%	950	2.28%	835	2.04%
Southeast Asian (Note: Statistic includes total responses of "Filipino" and "Southeast Asian" under visible minority section on census.)	770	1.77%	660	1.58%	780	1.86%	490	1.18%	335	0.82%
Indigenous	425	0.98%	240	0.58%	265	0.63%	155	0.37%	100	0.24%
Latin American	430	0.99%	240	0.58%	185	0.44%	255	0.61%	135	0.33%
African	185	0.43%	90	0.22%	185	0.44%	125	0.3%	80	0.2%
Other/multiracial (Note: Statistic includes total responses of "Visible minority, n.i.e." and "Multiple visible minorities" under visible minority section on census.)	670	1.54%	310	0.74%	365	0.87%	170	0.41%	100	0.24%
Total responses	43,385	98.33%	41,680	98.13%	42,045	98.48%	41,625	98.8%	40,860	98.65%
Total population	44,122	100%	42,473	100%	42,694	100%	42,131	100%	41,421	100%
Note: Totals greater than 100% due to multiple origin responses.

=== Religion ===
According to the 2021 census, religious groups in West Vancouver included:

- Irreligion (22,625 persons or 52.1%)
- Christianity (14,710 persons or 33.9%)
- Islam (3,855 persons or 8.9%)
- Buddhism (650 persons or 1.5%)
- Judaism (555 persons or 1.3%)
- Hinduism (300 persons or 0.7%)
- Sikhism (135 persons or 0.3%)
- Other (555 persons or 1.3%)

=== Language ===
2011 Canadian census
Mother language		Population	% of total population	% of non-official language population
English		28,280	67.1	N/A
Persian		3,400	8.1	25.7
Chinese	n.o.s.	1,415	3.4	10.7
Chinese	Mandarin	1,335	3.2	10.1
Chinese	Total	2750	6.6	20.8
German		1,015	2.4	7.7
Korean		915	2.2	6.9
French		545	1.3	N/A

As of the 2006 census, the languages spoken in West Vancouver were:

By mother tongue:

- English: 70%
- French: 1.2%
- Other languages: 28%

By most commonly used household language:

- English: 83%
- French: 0.4%
- Other languages: 14.5%

=== Affluence ===
West Vancouver is Canada's wealthiest municipality, with an average household net worth of CA$4,454,424. North Vancouver just next door is the tenth richest. West Vancouver is home to some very large, luxurious and expensive properties and houses. Occasionally, houses have been priced and sold at around $30,000,000. In 2011, West Vancouver's average house sold for over $2,000,000; 95% of the houses or close to 16,000 homes are worth over $1 million. In West Vancouver, average total incomes were $86,253 for males and $48,070 for females, almost double the provincial average. Over 80% of the population has a total family income of at least $100,000.

== Transportation ==
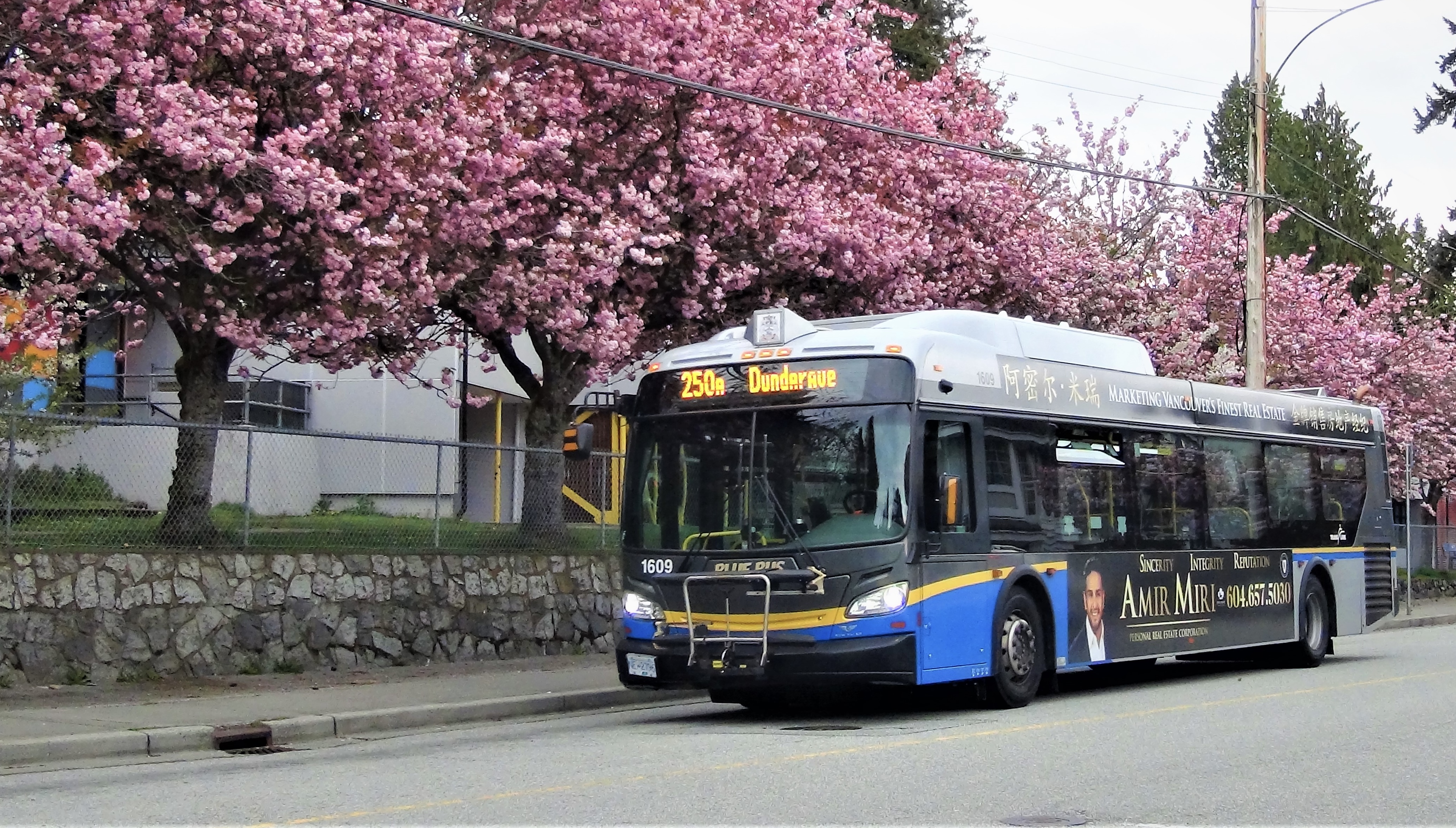
A West Vancouver Municipal Transit bus

West Vancouver is served by West Vancouver Municipal Transit, colloquially known as Blue Bus. West Vancouver Municipal Transit is one of two bus companies in the Greater Vancouver region operating under contract for TransLink. Transfer is free between West Vancouver Municipal Transit buses and other TransLink buses.

The only freeway route within municipal limits is British Columbia Highway 1 (part of the Trans-Canada Highway), which begins in the community of Horseshoe Bay and continues east into the District of North Vancouver. Highway 99 also runs through West Vancouver, sharing the freeway alignment with Highway 1 between Horseshoe Bay and Taylor Way, and connects the municipality with Downtown Vancouver (via the Lions Gate Bridge) and Whistler (via the Sea-to-Sky Corridor).

Additionally, BC Ferries operates routes departing from Horseshoe Bay to Nanaimo, Bowen Island, and the Sunshine Coast.

== Parks and recreation ==
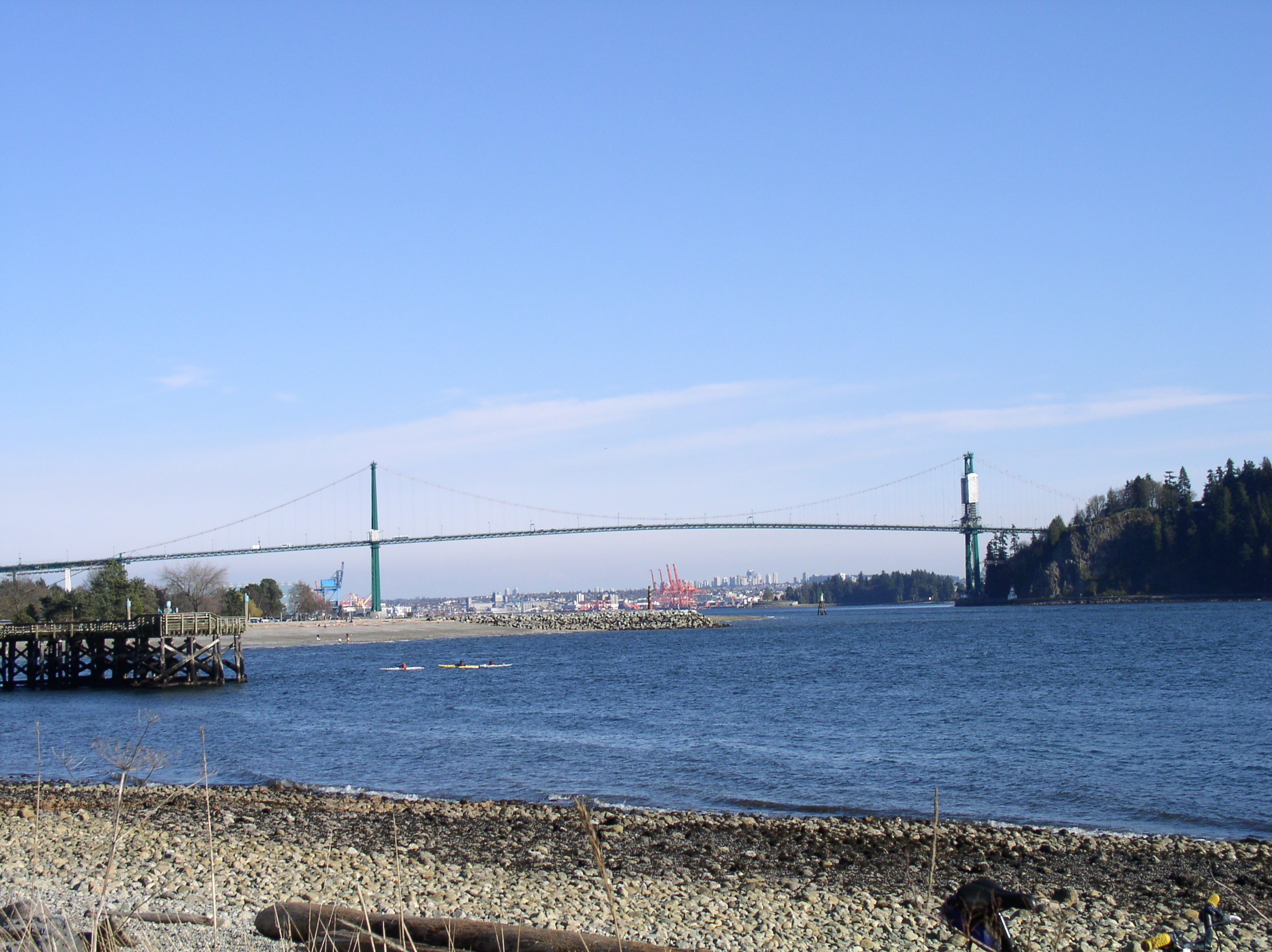
The Lions Gate Bridge viewed from Ambleside Park

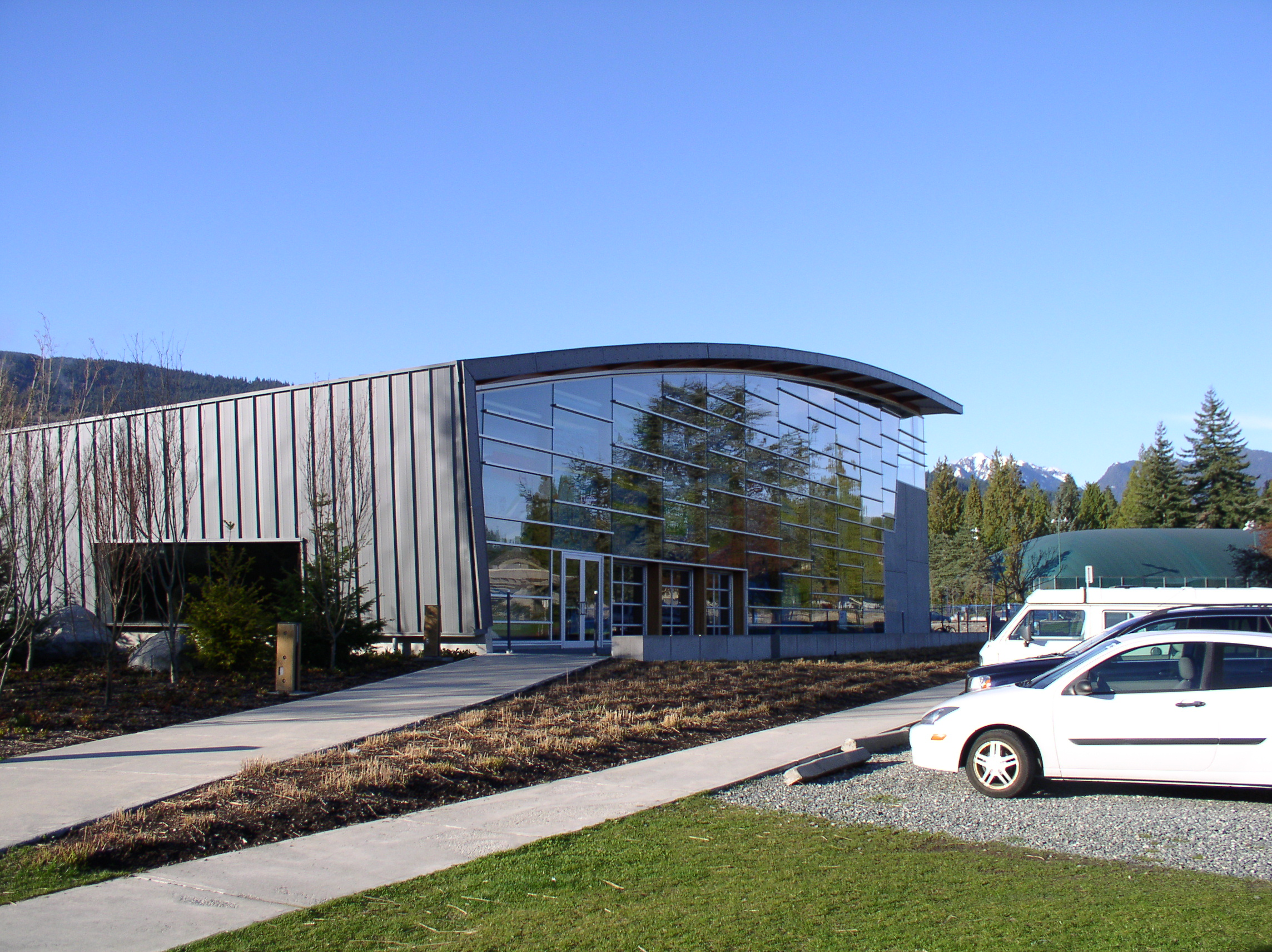
West Vancouver Aquatic Centre

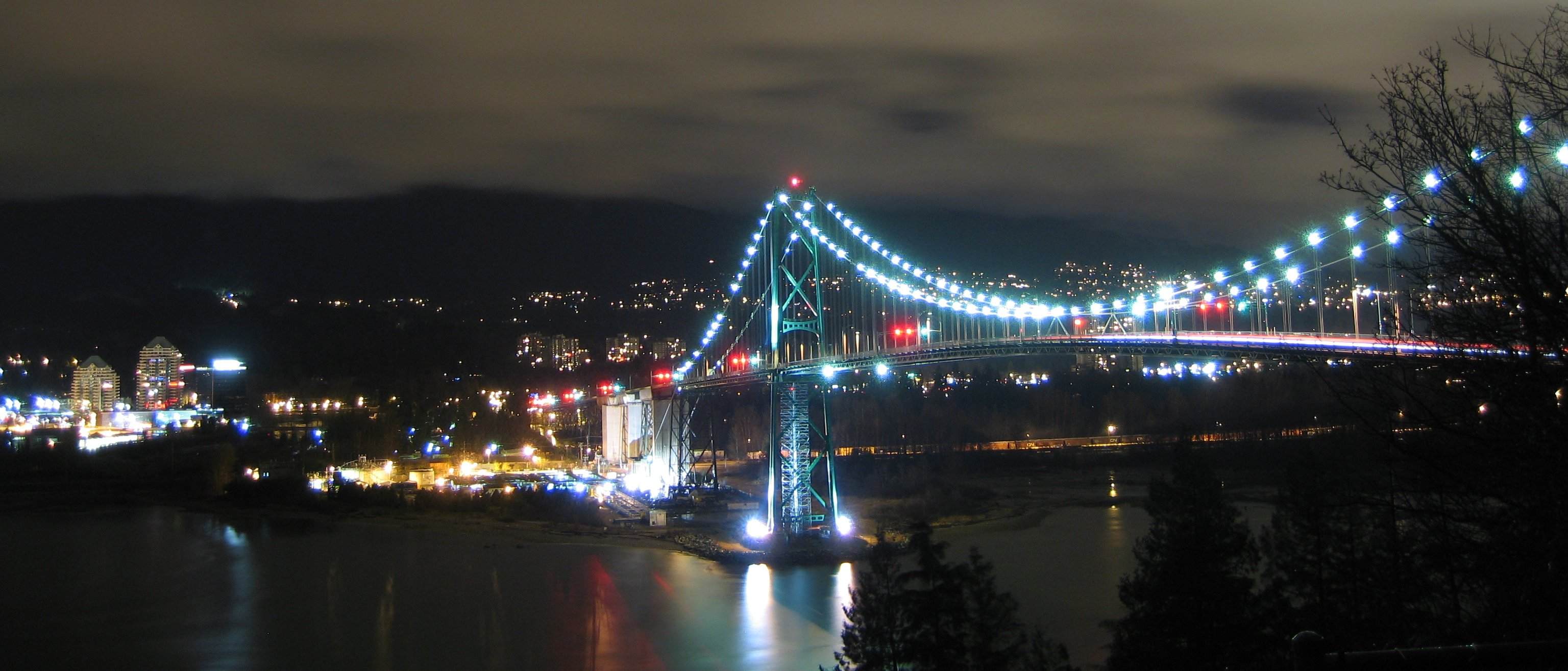
Lions Gate Bridge and West Vancouver

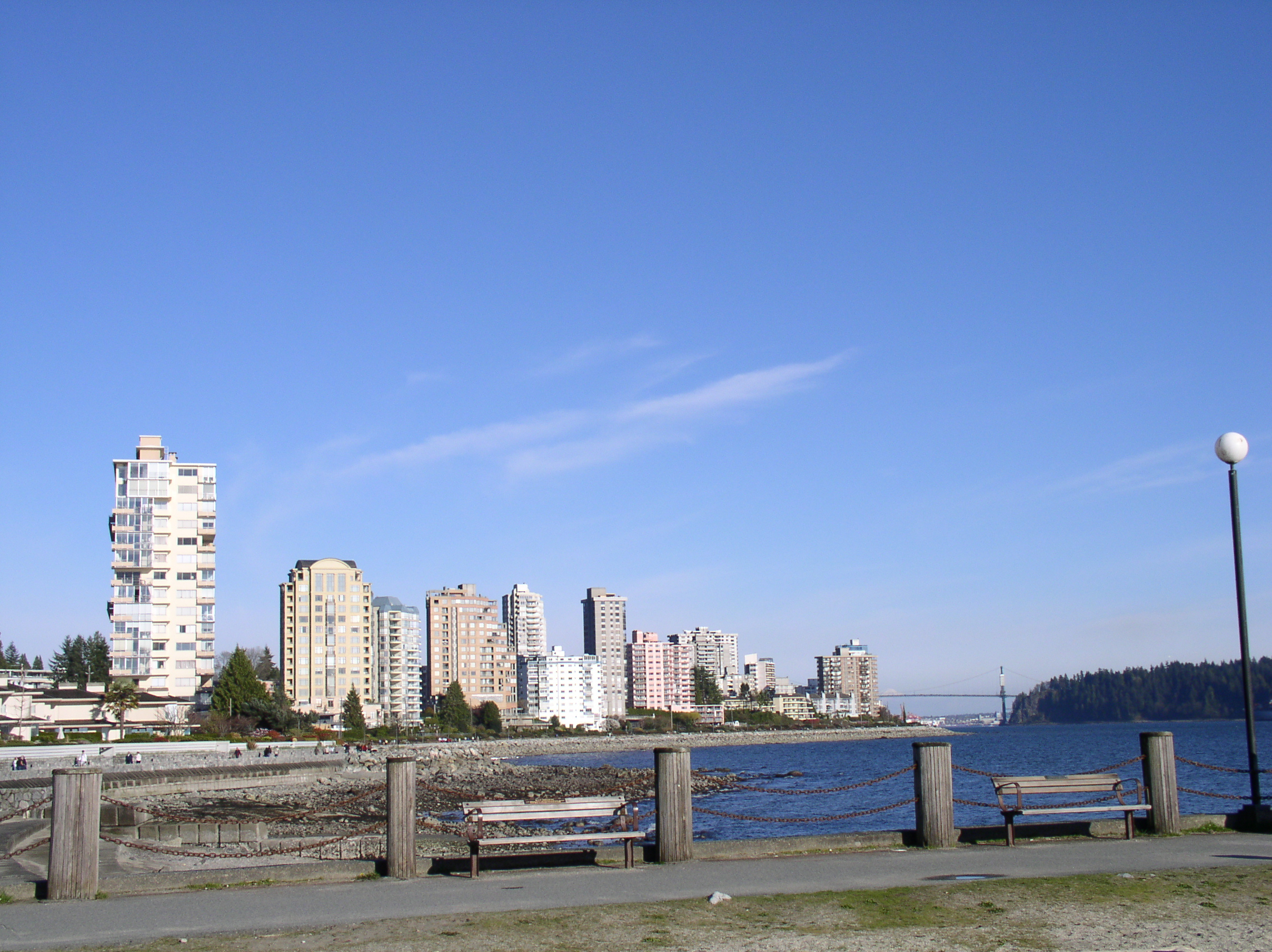
Apartment and condominium towers lined along the West Vancouver seawall

West Vancouver is known for its parks such as Cypress Provincial Park, which offers scenic views of Howe Sound and the Metro Vancouver area. Whytecliff Park and Lighthouse Park, near the community of Horseshoe Bay, at the continental terminus of the Trans-Canada Highway. All of West Vancouver is situated on the side of the Coast Mountains. Because of this position, many homes in West Vancouver have views of Vancouver Island, the Lower Mainland, and/or Howe Sound.

Ambleside Park and the 15-block-long West Vancouver Seawall are popular spots for families and outdoor enthusiasts. Whytecliff Park is regarded as one of the best scuba diving spots in Western Canada. The District also has many other small parks, as well as Lighthouse Park at Point Atkinson, which contains some old-growth forest and has with views of Vancouver from downtown to Point Grey and is the boundary-point between English Bay and the Strait of Georgia. John Lawson Park is also another popular area for families, it features a playground for children, an open grass field for families to picnic, and a view of Lions Gate Bridge and the downtown skyline which are both across the water.

West Vancouver has several public recreation facilities including an 18-hole par 3 golf course, a pool, an ice rink, basketball and tennis courts, skate parks and numerous public parks. The West Vancouver Community Centre (or WVCC) has been rebuilt and opened Spring 2009. Cypress Provincial Park also has mountain biking trails and a large ski and snowboard resort, which served as one of the venues for the 2010 Winter Olympics.

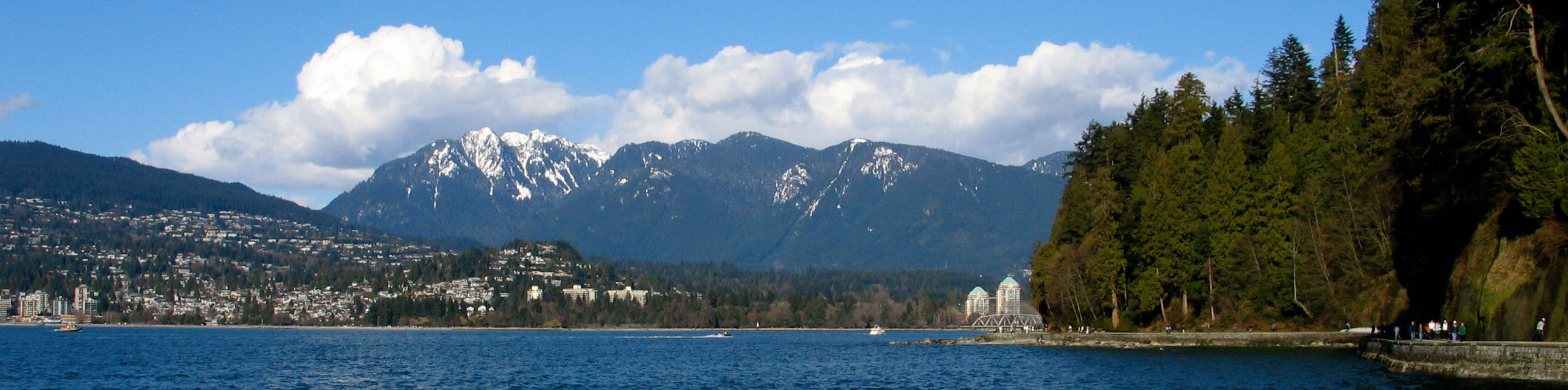
West Vancouver (left side) as seen from Stanley Park

== Climate ==
West Vancouver has a humid continental climate (Köppen: Dfb).

West Vancouver

Climate chart (precipitation, max. and min. temperature)
J	F	M	A	M	J	J	A	S	O	N	D
275 7 2	162 8 2	223 11 3	126 14 5	112 18 9	83 20 11	49 23 14	50 23 14	99 20 11	206 14 7	296 9 4	283 6 1
- █ Average max. and min. temperatures in °C
- █ Precipitation totals in mm
- Source: weatherstats.ca
Imperial conversion
J	F	M	A	M	J	J	A	S	O	N	D
11 44 35	6.4 47 35	8.8 51 38	5 57 41	4.4 64 47	3.3 68 52	1.9 74 56	2 74 57	3.9 68 53	8.1 57 45	12 49 38	11 43 34
- █ Average max. and min. temperatures in °F
- █ Precipitation totals in inches

Climate data for West Vancouver (1991–2020 normals, extremes 1992–present)
Month	Jan	Feb	Mar	Apr	May	Jun	Jul	Aug	Sep	Oct	Nov	Dec	Year
Record high humidex	—	—	—	27	33	46	39	38	35	27	—	—	46
Record high °C (°F)	17.9 (64.2)	17.9 (64.2)	24.3 (75.7)	28.8 (83.8)	31.7 (89.1)	40.6 (105.1)	36.0 (96.8)	35.5 (95.9)	33.6 (92.5)	25.0 (77.0)	19.2 (66.6)	15.6 (60.1)	40.6 (105.1)
Mean maximum °C (°F)	12.7 (54.9)	13.6 (56.5)	17.0 (62.6)	21.4 (70.5)	26.1 (79.0)	28.2 (82.8)	30.0 (86.0)	30.1 (86.2)	27.0 (80.6)	20.8 (69.4)	15.2 (59.4)	12.0 (53.6)	32.1 (89.8)
Mean daily maximum °C (°F)	6.9 (44.4)	8.3 (46.9)	10.5 (50.9)	13.8 (56.8)	17.8 (64.0)	20.2 (68.4)	23.1 (73.6)	23.4 (74.1)	20.1 (68.2)	14.0 (57.2)	9.2 (48.6)	6.3 (43.3)	14.5 (58.0)
Daily mean °C (°F)	4.0 (39.2)	4.3 (39.7)	6.1 (43.0)	8.7 (47.7)	12.5 (54.5)	15.1 (59.2)	17.8 (64.0)	17.9 (64.2)	14.9 (58.8)	10.0 (50.0)	6.1 (43.0)	3.5 (38.3)	10.1 (50.2)
Mean daily minimum °C (°F)	1.7 (35.1)	1.7 (35.1)	3.1 (37.6)	5.1 (41.2)	8.6 (47.5)	11.1 (52.0)	13.5 (56.3)	13.9 (57.0)	11.4 (52.5)	7.3 (45.1)	3.6 (38.5)	1.3 (34.3)	6.9 (44.4)
Mean minimum °C (°F)	−4.9 (23.2)	−3.3 (26.1)	−1.4 (29.5)	1.1 (34.0)	4.0 (39.2)	7.4 (45.3)	9.9 (49.8)	10.3 (50.5)	7.1 (44.8)	2.5 (36.5)	−2.1 (28.2)	−4.5 (23.9)	−7.8 (18.0)
Record low °C (°F)	−12.8 (9.0)	−9.5 (14.9)	−6.0 (21.2)	−1.6 (29.1)	0.6 (33.1)	4.9 (40.8)	7.1 (44.8)	7.3 (45.1)	3.4 (38.1)	−1.8 (28.8)	−10.5 (13.1)	−13.0 (8.6)	−13.0 (8.6)
Record low wind chill	−16	−10	−9	−4	—	—	—	—	—	−4	−13	−17	−17
Average precipitation mm (inches)	274.9 (10.82)	161.7 (6.37)	222.8 (8.77)	126.0 (4.96)	112.3 (4.42)	82.7 (3.26)	49.4 (1.94)	49.9 (1.96)	99.0 (3.90)	206.0 (8.11)	296.4 (11.67)	282.5 (11.12)	1,963.6 (77.3)
Average dew point °C (°F)	2.0 (35.6)	1.2 (34.2)	2.5 (36.5)	4.0 (39.2)	7.4 (45.3)	10.0 (50.0)	12.2 (54.0)	12.4 (54.3)	10.6 (51.1)	7.1 (44.8)	3.8 (38.8)	1.6 (34.9)	6.3 (43.3)
Source: weatherstats.ca

== Politics ==
As of October 2026, the mayor is Kirk LaPointe.

West Vancouver ridings typically include Squamish and Whistler, and sometimes the Sunshine Coast.

Provincially, Joan McIntyre and Ralph Sultan of the BC Liberal Party were elected to the West Vancouver-Sea To Sky and West Vancouver-Capilano ridings, respectively, in the 2005 Provincial election (West Vancouver-Sea To Sky Country includes Squamish, Whistler and Pemberton).

Federally, West Vancouver-based ridings historically have voted Conservative since 1974, electing John Reynolds of the Reform Party of Canada (later the Canadian Alliance) from 1997 to 2004. Reynolds declined to run for re-election in 2006, however, and Liberal Blair Wilson defeated Conservative John Weston to replace Reynolds as Member of Parliament from the West Vancouver—Sunshine Coast—Sea to Sky Country electoral district. Wilson left the Liberals in 2007 and joined the Green Party in 2008, becoming the first Green Member of Parliament. The re-election in 2008 saw a rematch between Weston and Wilson. This time Weston emerged as the victor, carrying nearly triple the vote of his incumbent opponent to handily return the riding to the Conservatives. Weston won again in 2011. In the 2015 federal election, Weston was unseated by Liberal candidate Pam Goldsmith-Jones, who was previously the mayor of West Vancouver from 2005 to 2011. Pamela Goldsmith-Jones chose not to run for re-election in the 2019 federal election and Patrick Weiler of the Liberal Party of Canada went on to win the election.

== Education ==
There are 17 public schools that make up School District 45 West Vancouver. There are also 4 private schools in the city. Of these 21 schools, 6 are high schools. Over 80 percent of West Vancouver high school graduates go to post-secondary schools. Many residents from Squamish, the Sunshine Coast, and North Vancouver attend West Vancouver schools.

== See also ==
- Architecture of Greater Vancouver
