= Ambleside, West Vancouver =

Village in British Columbia, Canada

Coordinates: 49.328298°N 123.156729°W

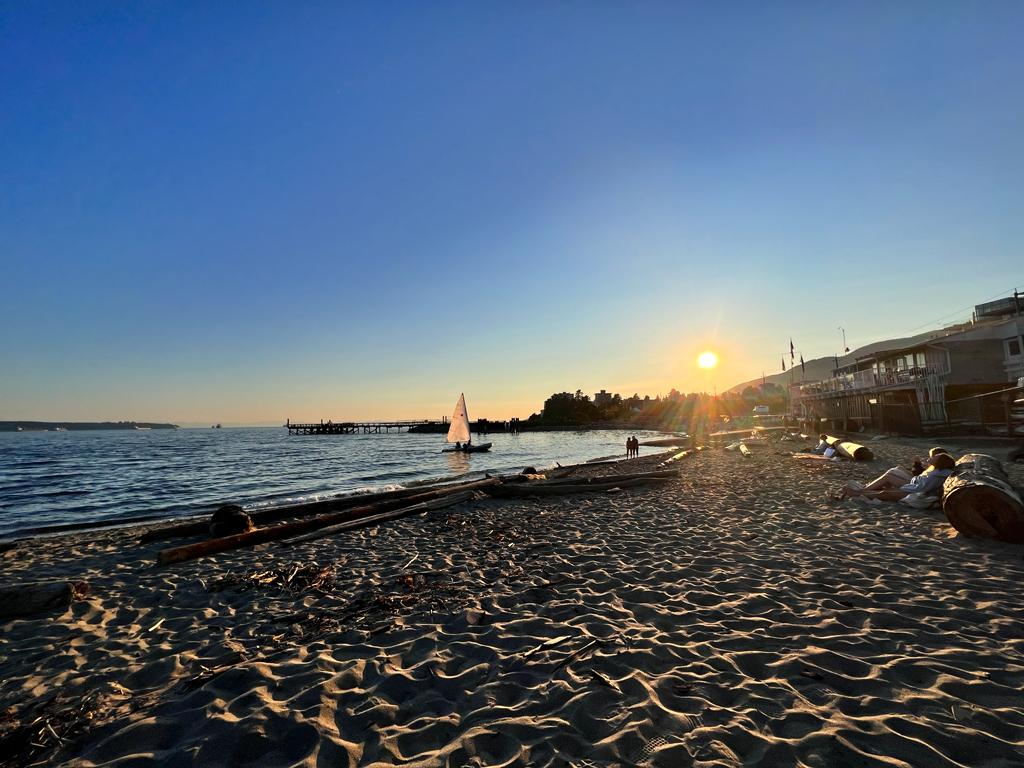
Beach in Ambleside

Ambleside is an oceanside village and neighbourhood in British Columbia, Canada, on the North Shore of the Burrard Inlet, within the municipality of West Vancouver that occupies the southeastern corner of the community, neighboured by Dundarave to the West, Park Royal to the East, and the British Properties to the North. Ambleside covers the area from 19th Street to 13th Street, and from Fulton Avenue down to the waterfront. Marine Drive forms the centre of the community's commercial core, with two streets leading off from it.

== History ==
Beginning in the 1800s, Ambleside was the main commercial centre of the community of West Vancouver. In 1886, "Navvy" Jack Thomas initiated the first ferry service between Vancouver and West Vancouver via the Ambleside waterfront, which lasted only one year. The next year, Thomas began hauling gravel, keeping his sloop in a lagoon then known as Ambleside Slough.

In 1907, a land developer named John Lawson developed a new regular ferry service from 17th Street as a means to make selling land in Ambleside a more attractive proposition. This ferry service resulted in much development in Ambleside as well as the neighbouring Dundarave and Hollyburn neighbourhoods. The last ferry crossing from Ambleside was in 1947, after which the pier was repurposed into an area for fishing purposes.

By 1914, most of the new businesses in the Ambleside region were built on stilts so as to avoid the swampy water of the area. Ambleside Park was designated in 1918, and by 1964, the slough had been mostly filled in with sand to become Ambleside Beach.
