= DGS Mastodon =

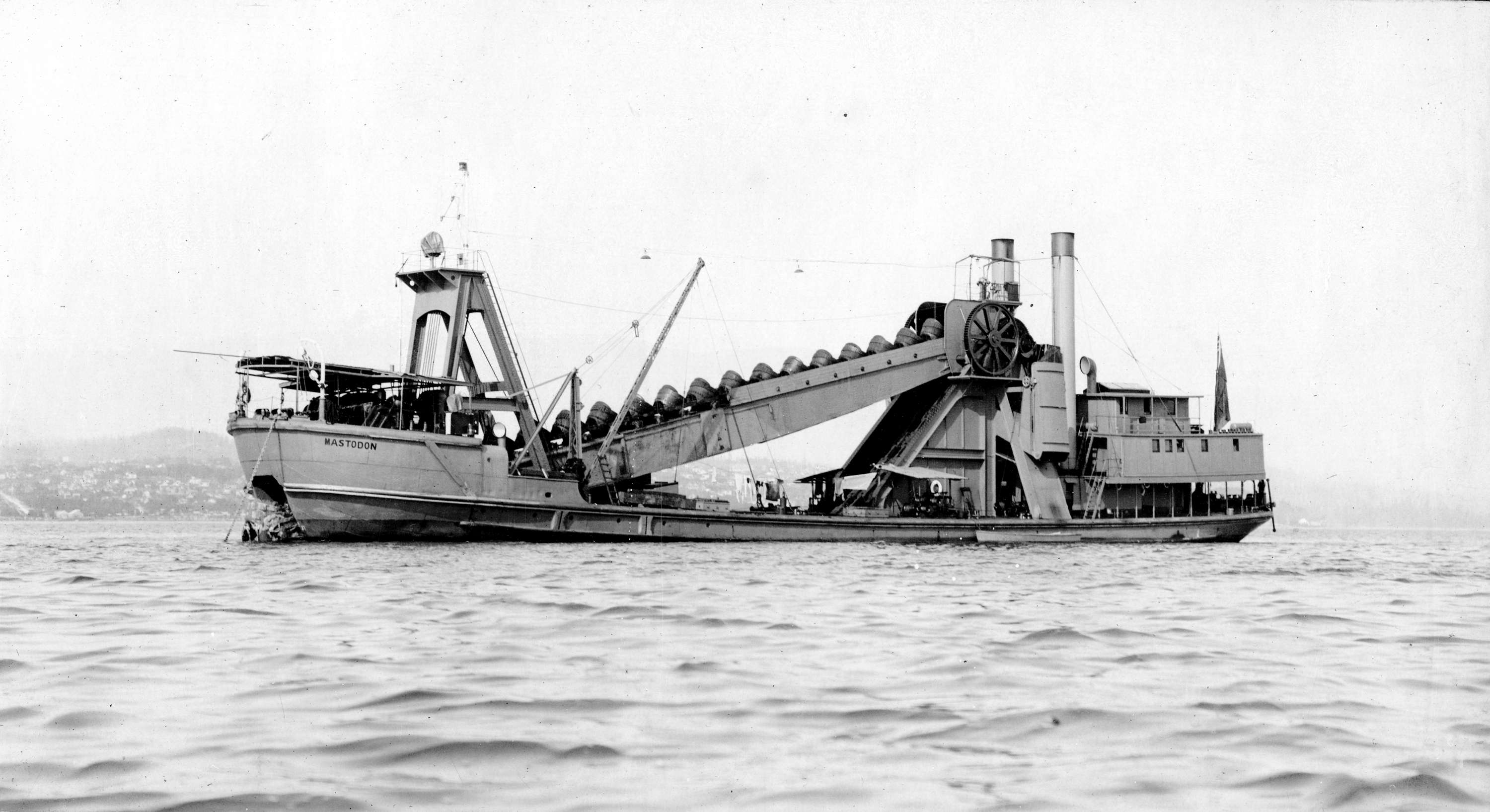
Mastodon dredging the first narrows, off Brockton Point.

DGS Mastodon was a dredge, operated by the Government of Canada, keeping shipping channels clear in British Columbia. She was ordered in 1909, from the Scottish shipyard William Simons and Company, and commissioned on May 13, 1911.

From 1912 to 1917 she was employed widening Vancouver's first narrows, expanding the safe shipping channel from 900 feet (270 m) to 1,400 feet (430 m).

In 1942 she was transferred to the Royal Canadian Navy. In 1946 she was sold to Imperial Oil, who then sold her to International Petroleum Company Limited, of Callao, Peru. In 1963 she was scrapped, in Lima, Peru.
