= North Burnaby =

Neighourhood in Burnaby, British Columbia

Coordinates: 49°16′N 122°59′W

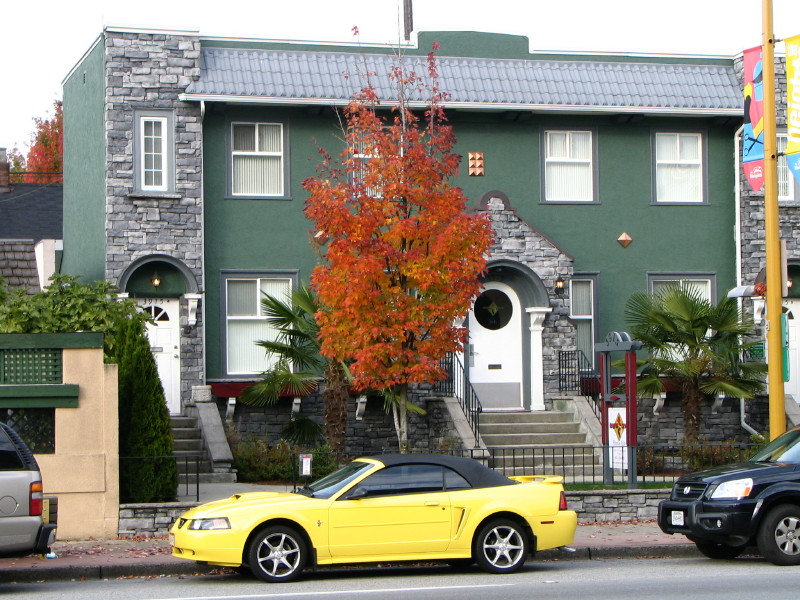
A recently renovated old building on Hastings Street near Ingleton Avenue, in the Burnaby Heights area

North Burnaby is a general name for a large neighbourhood in the city of Burnaby, British Columbia, Canada, that includes a number of smaller ones. It stretches from Boundary Road in the west to Burnaby Mountain with Simon Fraser University in the east and is bounded by Burrard Inlet to the north and the Lougheed Highway to the south. It is a desirable place to live for many local and immigrant families, which is reflected by real-estate prices that keep climbing and have doubled in the last 15 years.

== Transportation ==
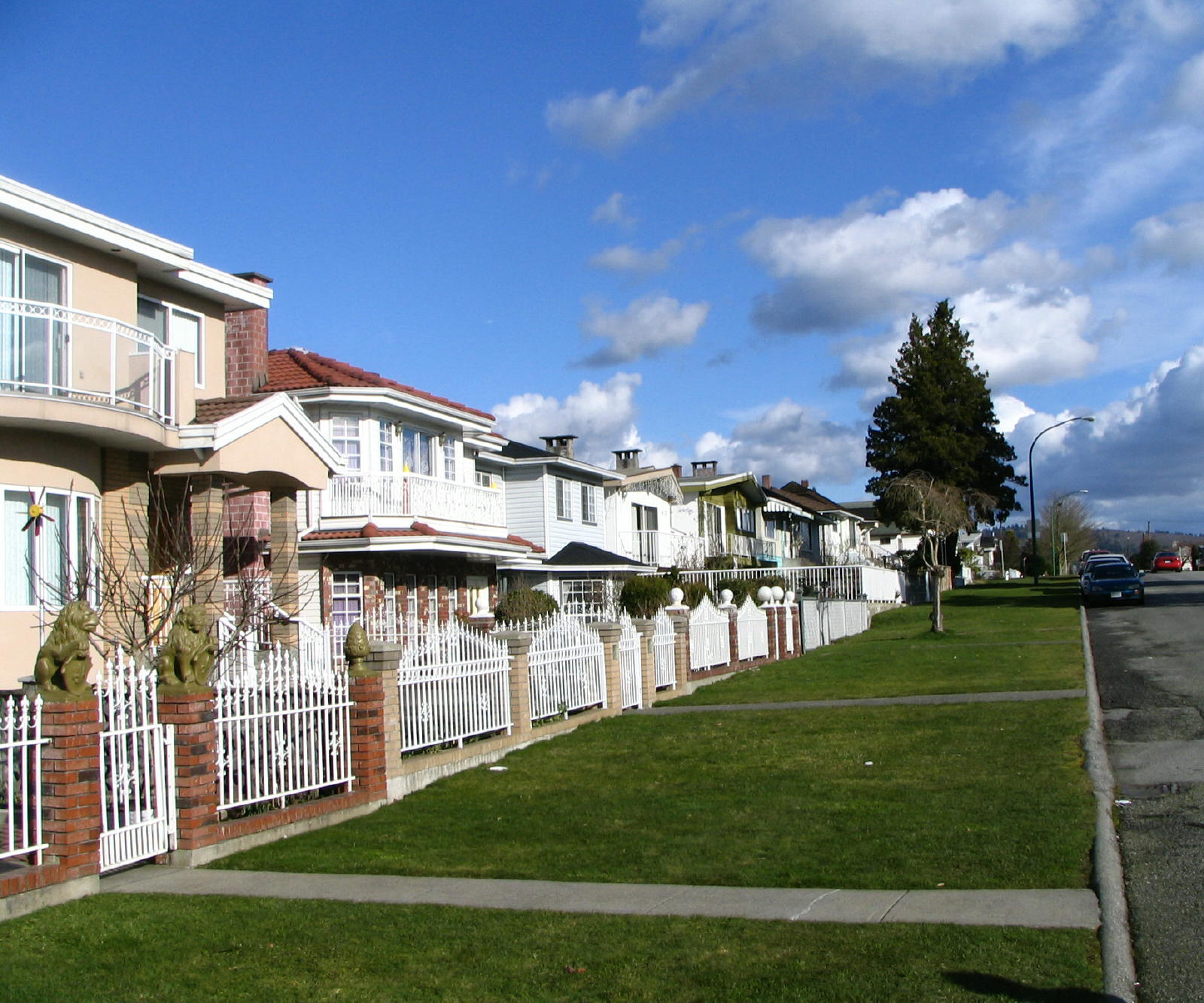
A typical North Burnaby streetscape

A number of major arteries run through this neighbourhood, primarily the high-traffic Hastings Street connecting North Burnaby with Downtown Vancouver and Port Moody, Willingdon Avenue linking it to Kingsway and Metrotown, and Kensington Ave going south to Canada Way and New Westminster. The neighbourhood is served by several bus routes, including the R5 RapidBus, which runs along Hastings Street and provides connections to downtown Vancouver and Simon Fraser University. The West Coast Express commuter train runs through North Burnaby along Burrard Inlet, but does not have any stations in the neighbourhood.

== Shopping and amenities ==
The Heights commercial district between Boundary Road and Gamma Avenue is home to several Italian, Portuguese and Chinese restaurants, delis, bakeries and barbershops. Brentwood Town Centre is a popular shopping centre located near the intersection of Willingdon Ave and Lougheed Highway. The nearby Madison Centre at Lougheed Highway and Rosser Avenue also contains a number of shops and services, including Save-On-Foods and Winners stores. There are two Safeway stores along Hastings Street — a recently rebuilt store at Hastings and Willingdon and a smaller Kensington store further east.

== Parks and recreation ==
The historic Heights area north of Hastings still has a number of old homes representing the 1900s–1920s residential architecture. There are several parks in North Burnaby — for example, Confederation Park just west of Capitol Hill, Montrose Park on the shore of the Inlet a common venue for birdwatching, and Willingdon Heights Park off Douglas Road and Kensington Park with its ice skating arena and public golf facilities (pitch and putt). Just off Inlet Drive heading towards Port Moody, there is also a seashore park called Barnet Marine Park, with a beach that overlooks Belcarra Regional Park across the narrow passage.
