= McCombe Lake =

- Location within British Columbia
- Location: Anmore, British Columbia, Canada
- Coordinates: 49.3685°N 122.861°W
- Type: Reservoir
- Primary inflows: Waterway from Buntzen Lake
- Primary outflows: Pipes to Indian Arm power stations
- Basin countries: Canada

McCombe Lake is a small lake just to the north of Buntzen Lake in Anmore, British Columbia. It is named after Bob McCombe, foreman of Tunnel Camp, who lived beside the lake with his family from 1911–1929. The lake is the location of two outflows that lead to Buntzen Powerhouses number 1 and 2. The primary inflow of the lake is a short waterway that leads from Buntzen Lake.

== See also ==
- List of lakes of British Columbia
