= Eagle Mountain (British Columbia) =

Mountain in British Columbia, Canada

- Eagle Ridge
- Location within British Columbia
- Interactive map of Eagle Mountain

Highest point
- Elevation: 1,050 m (3,440 ft)
- Prominence: 60 m (200 ft)
- Coordinates: 49°20′52″N 122°49′48″W

Geography
- Location: Lower Mainland, British Columbia, Canada
- District: New Westminster Land District
- Parent range: Pacific Ranges
- Topo map: NTS 92G7 Port Coquitlam

Eagle Mountain, also known as Eagle Ridge, is the mountainous ridge with many indistinct summits between Buntzen Lake and Coquitlam Lake near Coquitlam, British Columbia. Its proximity to Coquitlam, and the houses being built on its southern slopes (known as Westwood Plateau), make it a very popular weekend destination for hiking, mountain biking, horseback riding, and ATV riding. There is a network of logging roads leading up the south side of the summit to a plateau area with lakes, hiking trails and mountain biking trails.

In 1903, the Vancouver Power Company (now BC Hydro) built a 3.6 km (2 mi) long, 1.2 km (1 mi) deep tunnel under Eagle Mountain from Coquitlam Lake to Buntzen Lake to supply water to Vancouver's first hydroelectric power plant on Indian Arm. This tunnel, and the power plants on Indian Arm are still operational.

Eagle Mountain is in Indian Arm Provincial Park.
