= Təmtəmíxʷtən/Belcarra Regional Park =

Regional park in British Columbia

təmtəmíxʷtən/Belcarra Regional Park
- Belcarra Regional Park
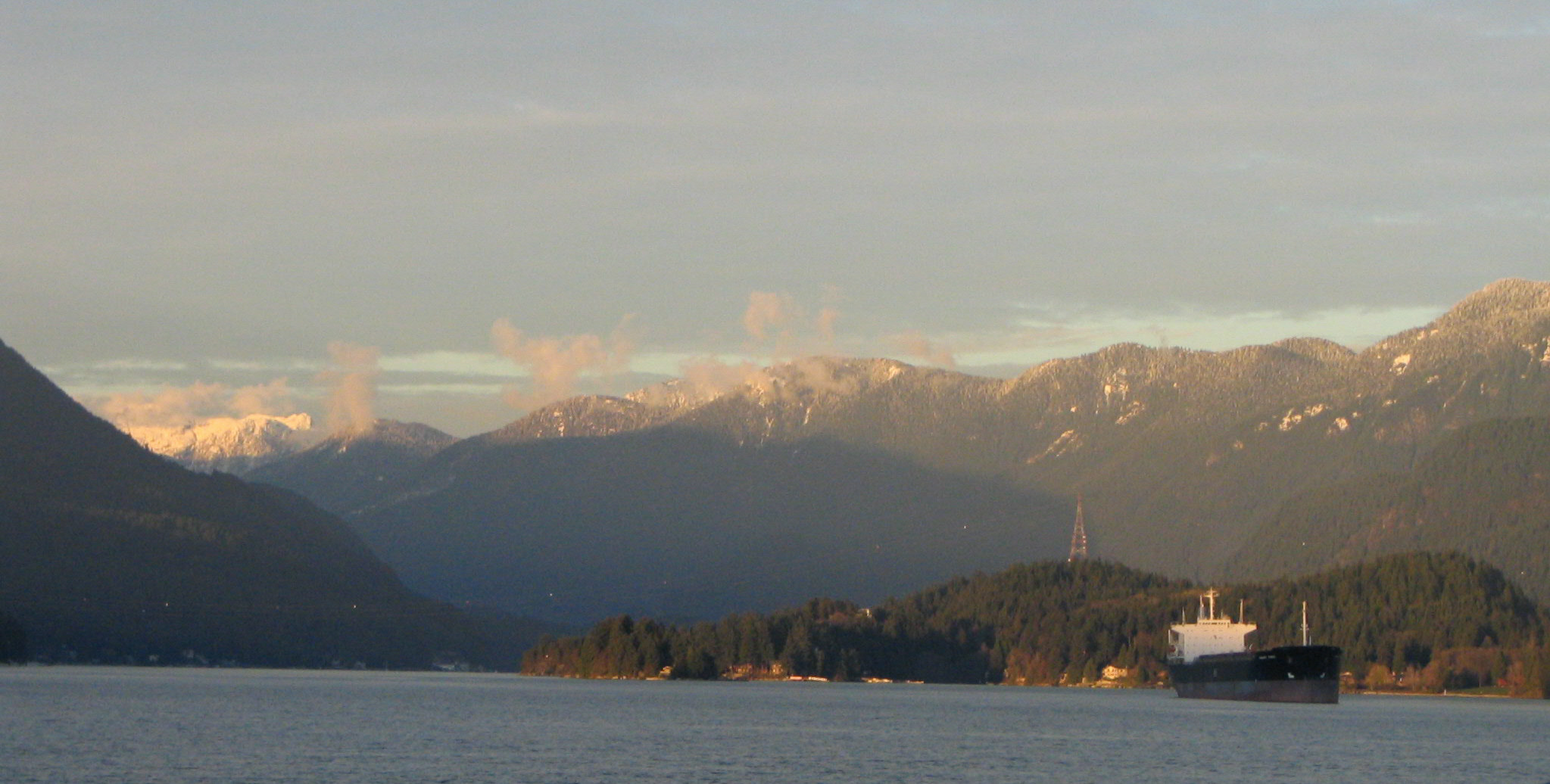
- təmtəmíxʷtən/Belcarra Regional Park from Westridge Terminal. Eagle Ridge in the background, with part of Mamquam Mountain, which lies east of Squamish, visible at left rear

- Location within Greater Vancouver Regional District
- Location: British Columbia, Canada
- Nearest city: Belcarra, British Columbia
- Coordinates: 49.3184°N 122.8936°W
- Area: 1,100 hectares (2,700 acres)
- Operator: Metro Vancouver Regional District
- Website: metrovancouver.org/services/regional-parks/park/t%C9%99mt%C9%99m%C3%ADx%CA%B7t%C9%99n-belcarra-regional-park

təmtəmíxʷtən/Belcarra Regional Park is a 1,100-hectare (2,700-acre) regional park located in Belcarra, Greater Vancouver, British Columbia. It is northeast of the meeting of Burrard Inlet with Indian Arm, beginning near Belcarra Bay and extending to Sasamat Lake. The park is northwest of the Village of Anmore and to the southwest of Buntzen Lake. A part of its 1,104 hectares, are the 92 hectares of Admiralty Point Lands, ocean waterfront lands in Port Moody.

Included in the park is a First Nations archaeological site, which is operated and maintained by Metro Vancouver Regional Parks.

In October 2021, the park was renamed from "Belcarra Regional Park" to "təmtəmíxʷtən/Belcarra Regional Park", which means "biggest place for all the people", to reflect the history of the Tsleil-Waututh people who are indigenous to the area.

== History ==
A lease signed by the federal government in 1913 gave Vancouver the rights to manage the Admiralty Point lands, which were then redistributed to Metro Vancouver on July 28, 1972. After Metro Vancouver successfully gained control of the Admiralty Point Lands, they also came into possession of private and crown land in Sasamat Lake and Buntzen Ridge, and other forested area. These areas are part of the protected Belcarra Regional Park and are about 400 hectares each.

Since the lease ended in May 2011, management rights were reassigned to the Government of Canada. During the period of May 2011–2014, the Government of Canada argued that these lands were a "surplus" to Parks Canada, and no longer warranted protection. Despite this, in 2014, they renegotiated an agreement with municipal leaders, that the park will be protected and managed through Parks Canada.

Belcarra South is another area included within Belcarra Regional Park. A heritage house named Bole House can be found here, along with Jug Island.

== Cultural and ecological significance ==
Within Belcarra Regional Park is one of the Tsleil-Waututh Nation's ancestral villages. The Tsleil-Waututh nation has strong historical and cultural ties to this land.

To acknowledge the Tsleil-Waututh Nation's connection to the land, Belcarra Regional Park was officially renamed "təmtəmíxʷtən". It means "the biggest place for all the people" in the hən̓q̓əmin̓əm̓ language. This decision was made on February 18, 2020.

In addition to a name change, the Tsleil-Waututh Nation are now collaborating with Metro Vancouver in their management of the park. The goal of this agreement is to improve protection of the park and demonstrate Metro Vancouver's commitment to continuing to cooperate, consult and include the Tsleil-Waututh Nation in decision-making processes. Currently, the agreement does not include any specific clauses. This allows the Tsleil-Waututh Nation to put forth any and all activities and cultural sites that require consideration, during conservation and management processes.

The Admiralty Point Lands in Belcarra Regional Park have ecological significance, due to their positioning in the Coastal Western Hemlock dry subzone, home to both mature and young coniferous and broadleaf forest, rocky bluffs and intertidal areas and streams. The protection of these areas is particularly important as the rate of urbanization increases and threatens habitats- most significantly, mature coniferous forests.

== Land use and wildlife ==
Belcarra Regional Park sees almost 600,000 visitors each year. The recreational activities enjoyed by these visitors include kayaking, canoeing, boating, scuba diving, birdwatching, picnicking, swimming, hiking and fishing. Archaeological sites are also located on these lands.

Some examples of species that reside in the park are deer, bears, waterfowl, shore birds, seals, crabs and other plants and animals found beneath the ocean's surface. While bears and deer depend on the large tracts made available by mature coniferous forests, the intertidal zone is helpful in managing the migration patterns of waterfowl, shore birds, and plant and animal species found in the ocean.

The park has been known to accommodate an extensive habitat for black bears for the longest period of time. Rules and safety precautions have been implemented within the park by Metro Vancouver to lessen the chances of a bear encounter and to react safely if one was to happen. The park has added bear-proof garbage disposals to prevent bears from breaking in.

Belcarra Regional Park permits crab fishing, allowing for only male crabs to be caught in order to protect nearby breeding stocks. Valid tidal license's are required for crab fishing. Fishing may also be permitted in Sasamat Lake; however, a non-tidal angling license is needed. This can be obtained by the BC Ministry of Sports, Recreation, Arts and Culture.

Belcarra Regional Park boasts a wide array of bird species, primarily seen along the parks shoreline trail system. The common merganser and hooded merganser are two frequently observed duck species in the area, and can often be seen utilizing their long bills to catch fish on the shoreline of the Port Moody Arm of Burrard Inlet. The Common Merganser can often be mistaken for a Mallard, due to their white body plumage and distinct green head. Osprey can be seen nesting on man-made platforms near the shoreline in the summer months. Purple martins, a migratory bird species that journey annually from their wintering habitat in South America to breeding grounds in Belcarra Regional Park, can be observed on small wooden nest boxes along the shoreline trail system

== Conservation ==
Belcarra Regional Park is considered "Conservation and Recreation" area. Because of this, its wildlife and land will be protected through measures imposed regionally and provincially. These include policies targeted at ensuring the park is being appropriately used, to avoid disturbing the ecosystem. In addition, the park's eelgrass beds, forests, woodlands, and wetlands are classified as "Environmentally Sensitive Areas", which has introduced policies aimed to support proper development, to prevent them from experiencing ecological damage.

The efforts to protect the Admiralty Point Lands introduced the Regional Park System, which is responsible for managing regional parks, ecological conservancy areas, regional park reserves, and greenways in Metro Vancouver.

With the number of visitors, from within the "Tri-Cities", Port Moody, Coquitlam, and Port Coquitlam, and outside these areas increasing, it becomes even more imperative that conservation efforts continue. This is accounted for in Metro Vancouver's Regional Growth Strategy.

The implementation of weekly patrolling prevents the illegal use of land, tree-cutting, and fires from occurring. The abolishment of cabins in 1981 and 1982 was also an influential step in reducing destruction of the land.
