= Say Nuth Khaw Yum Provincial Park =

Provincial park in British Columbia, Canada

- Indian Arm Provincial Park
- IUCN category II (national park)
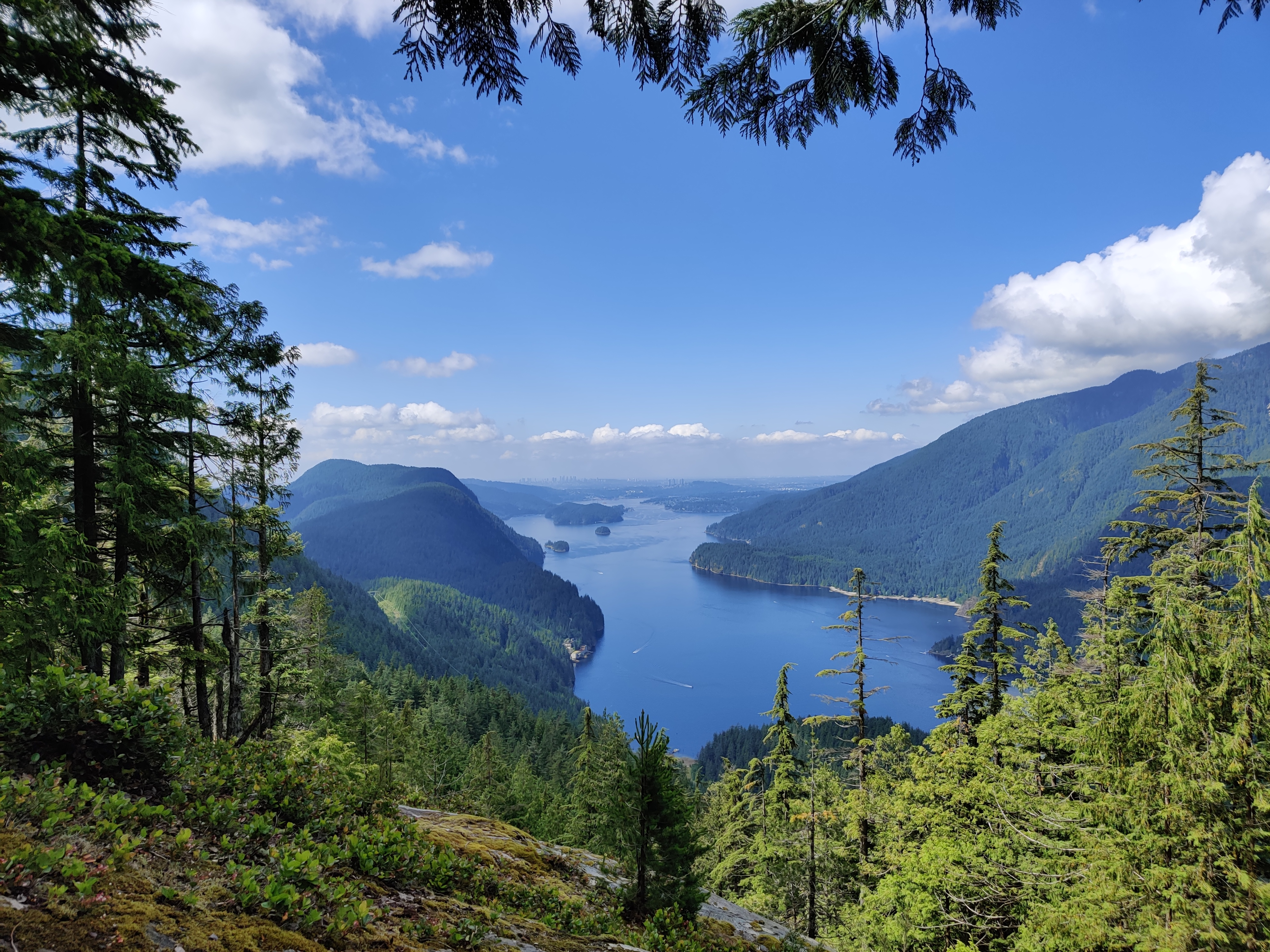
- A southward view of Indian Arm, taken along the Dilly Dally Loop trail.

- Location within British Columbia Location within Greater Vancouver Regional District
- Interactive map of Say Nuth Khaw Yum Provincial Park
- Location: Metro Vancouver, British Columbia, Canada
- Nearest city: North Vancouver
- Coordinates: 49°26′0″N 122°52′0″W
- Area: 6,689 ha (25.83 sq mi)
- Established: July 13, 1995; 31 years ago
- Governing body: BC Parks
- Website: bcparks.ca/say-nuth-khaw-yum-park-aka-indian-arm-park/

Say Nuth Khaw Yum Provincial Park, also known as Indian Arm Provincial Park, is a provincial park located in the Lower Mainland of British Columbia, Canada. The park was established on July 13, 1995 by BC Parks to protect the forested mountain terrain of Indian Arm.

== History ==
In 1998, a cooperative park management agreement was signed between BC Parks and the Tsleil-Waututh First Nation.

In February 2010, the park name was changed from Indian Arm Provincial Park to Say Nuth Khaw Yum Provincial Park as part of a second cooperative park management agreement between BC Parks and the Tsleil-Waututh First Nation. Say Nuth Khaw Yum means "Serpent's Land" in Halkomelem, the traditional language of the Tsleil-Waututh First Nation.

== Geography ==
Say Nuth Khaw Yum Park covers 6,689 hectares (16,530 acres) of mountainous terrain surrounding Indian Arm, an 18 kilometre long fjord that extends north from Burrard Inlet.

The southeastern corner of the park surrounds most of Buntzen Lake, a small reservoir managed by BC Hydro.

This park also contains a number of significant archaeological sites.

== Activities ==
The park's close proximity to the Greater Vancouver metropolitan area makes it a popular destination for recreation. Popular activities include hiking, camping, kayaking, and scuba diving.

The southeastern corner of the park features a well-developed trail system, most of which are rated as moderately difficult.

== Gallery ==
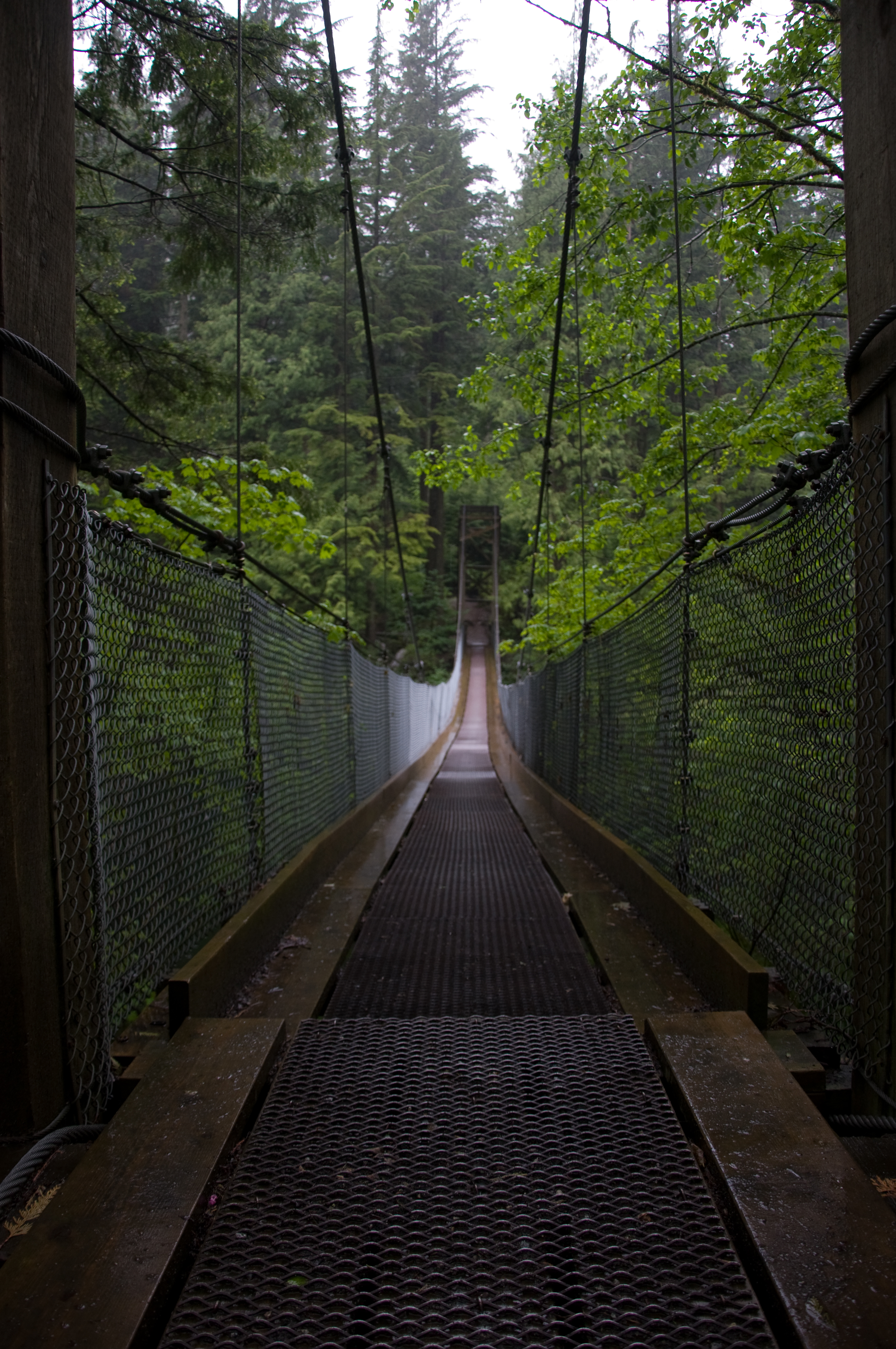
A suspension footbridge on Buntzen Lake Trail

== See also ==
- Golden Ears Provincial Park
