= Sasamat Outdoor Centre =

Summer camp in British Columbia, Canada

Coordinates: 49.3234°N 122.8948°W

Sasamat Outdoor Centre is an outdoor facility specializing in 'summer camp' type activities. From the week of July 1 to the end of August the camp offers week-long Day Camps and Resident Camps for ages 6 through 16, and Family Camp opportunities on several weekends. The camp operates on Greater Vancouver Regional District land but has renewed ownership with a twenty-year lease, taking effect in January 2008.

== History ==
Sasamat Outdoor Centre began its first year as a summer camp in 1986. Within a year they were already planning out trips to Pitt Lake (note: this practice has since been discontinued) and successfully began their resident camp program. Although it began with a humble start, the camp quickly gained a reputation in the area for its impeccable care. By 1990 a new manager was hired and the camp began to look like it does today. Seven cabins were constructed as well as new cottages for younger resident campers. The teen camp program also had its first start in 1998. They have recently added a high ropes course.

== Camp Wallace ==
Before there was Camp Sasamat, there was Camp Wallace. Originally on what is today White Pine Beach, Camp Wallace was a very wilderness-oriented camp. The first season of Camp Wallace was summer 1978. The camp consisted of tents and tarps with a few cabins for the campers, day camps were not offered at this camp. The kitchen was reduced to a small stove, very different from the commercial kitchen which operates at Camp Sasamat today. In 1984 the Greater Vancouver Regional District decided to turn the land which Camp Wallace was housed on into a public beach, and offered to move Camp Wallace across the lake to where Camp Sasamat is today. Wallace rejected the offer, but a new camp with a new name was ready for the summer of 1985.

== Stave Lake ==
Every year about mid-August the teen program at Sasamat Outdoor Centre organizes a canoe trip to Stave Lake, located in nearby Mission, British Columbia. The trip consists of two days at the camp learning about canoeing and getting to know the fellow campers and then a five-day canoeing adventure at Stave Lake. The lake itself measures 30 km in diameter, so about 5 or 6 km is covered each day, with the group setting up for camp at nighttime. Stave Lake Canoe Trip allows its participants to age from 13 to 16, giving campers who were too old for the teen camp (13 – 15 years) one last hurrah from Camp Sasamat. This trip has been happening since about 1992.
