= Buntzen Lake =

Body of water in British Columbia, Canada

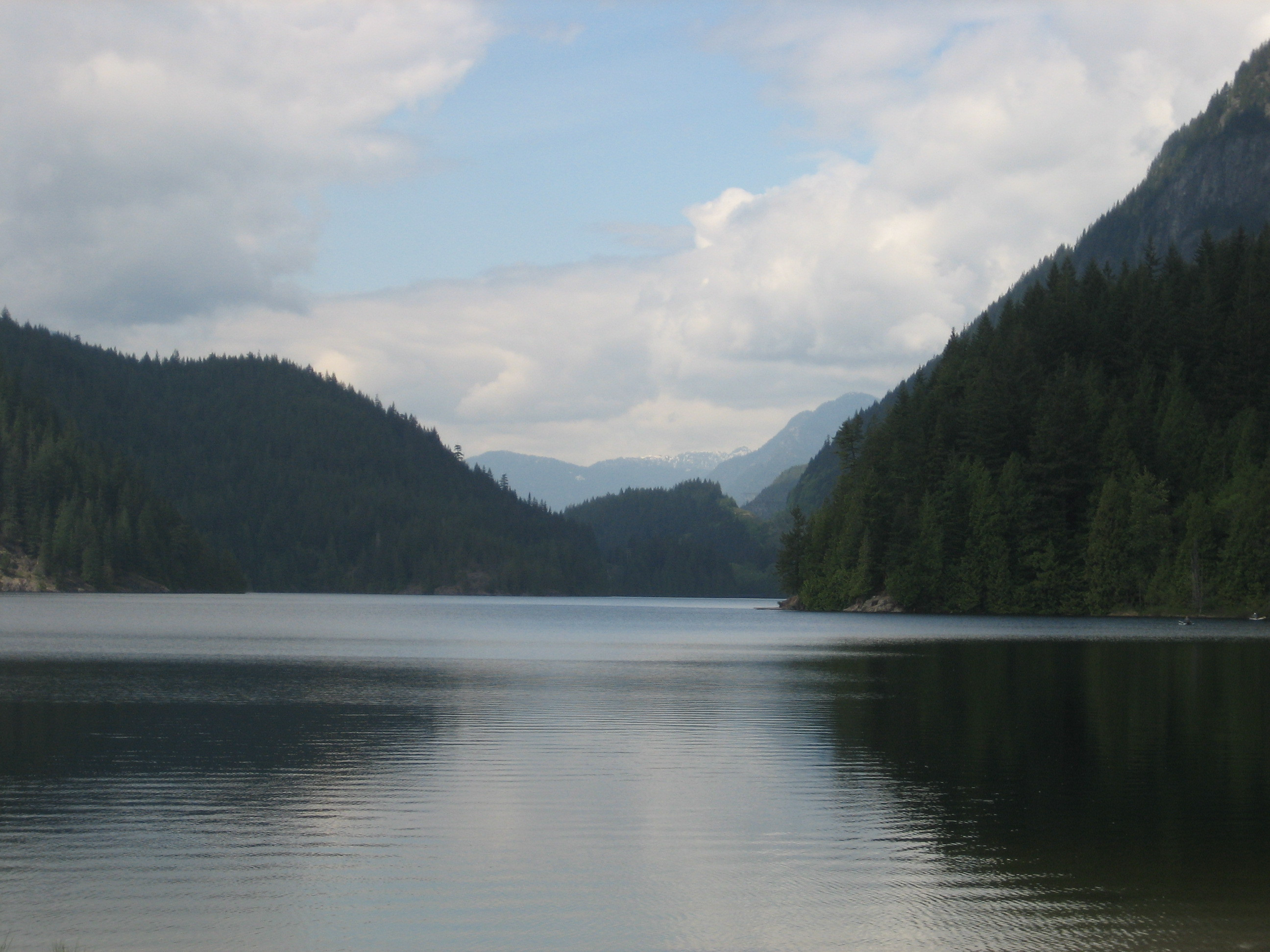
- Buntzen Lake looking north from public beach at south end

- Location within British Columbia
- Location: Just north of Anmore
- Coordinates: 49.349°N 122.860°W
- Type: reservoir
- Primary inflows: tunnel from Coquitlam Lake
- Primary outflows: penstocks to Indian Arm power stations
- Basin countries: Canada
- Surface area: 1.82 km^{2} (0.70 sq mi)
- Average depth: 30 m (98 ft)
- Max. depth: 65 m (213 ft)
- Surface elevation: 123 m (404 ft)
- References: BC Hydro

Buntzen Lake is a 4.8 kilometres (3 mi) long lake in Anmore, British Columbia, Canada, in the Greater Vancouver area. It is named after the first general manager of the B.C. Electric Co., Johannes Buntzen. There is a smaller lake just to the north named McCombe Lake.

== History ==
Buntzen lake used to be named Trout Lake, and was also called Lake Beautiful, and was renamed to Buntzen Lake in 1905 at the opening of the tunnel to Coquitlam Lake.

In 1903 the lake was used to power Vancouver's first hydroelectric plant the Buntzen Powerhouse. A tunnel was excavated through Eagle Mountain from Coquitlam Lake to Buntzen Lake. Coquitlam Lake was dammed, and water flowed 3.6 kilometres (2.2 mi) through the tunnel to Buntzen Lake, and from there, through an outlet at the north end of the lake to two power generating stations on Indian Arm. The first, Powerhouse No 1 built in 1903, and the second 300M away, Powerhouse No 2 built in 1914. At 49.370573°N 122.873783°W

Buntzen Lake was used in another power generating plant, Burrard Generating Station, a gas-powered plant, where the lake water was used to produce steam for the generators. This generating station was shut down in 2016.

The area around the lake is managed by BC Hydro as a recreation site and visitors can swim, fish, hike, and boat on the lake.

== Recreation ==
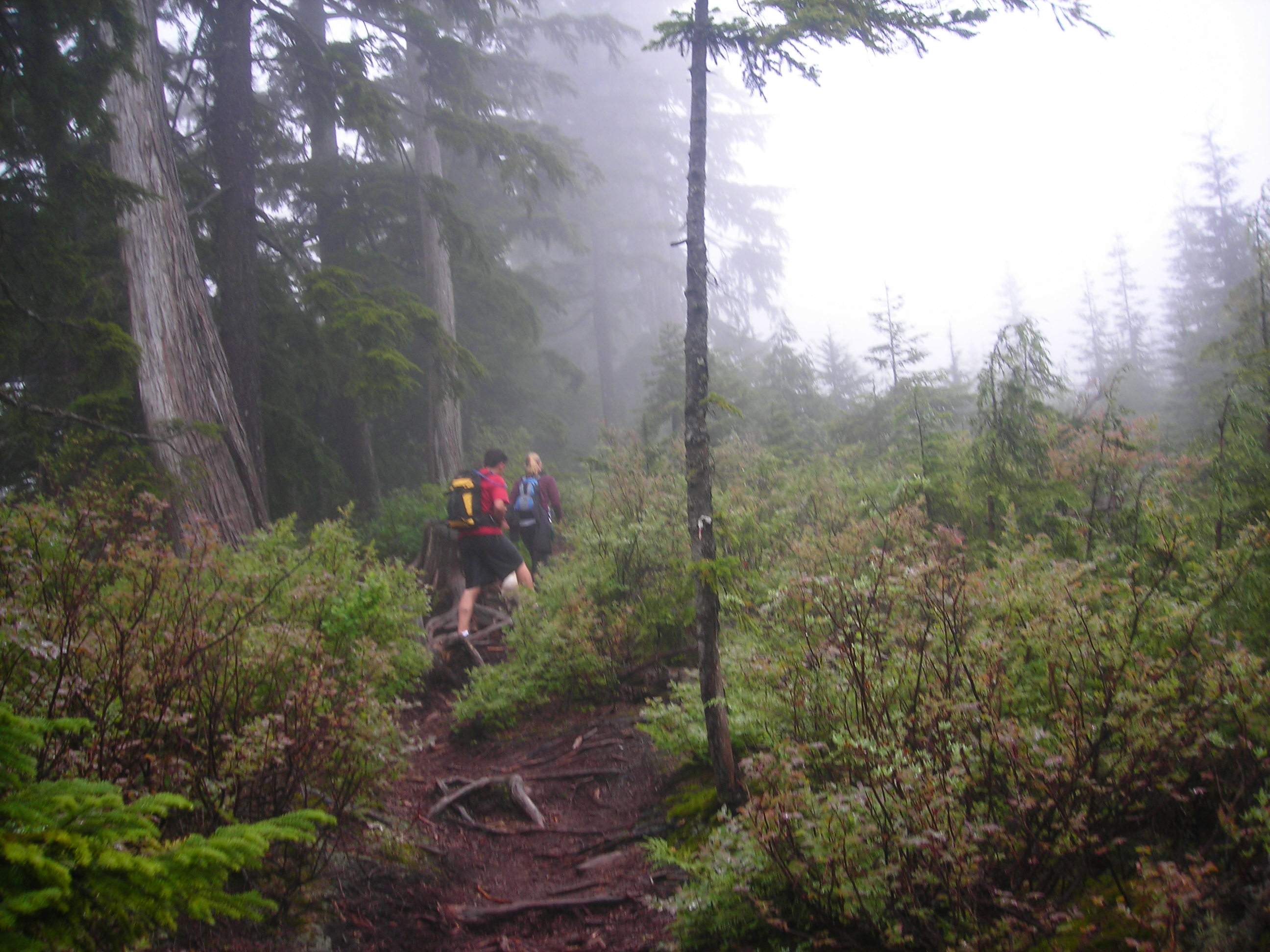

There are many trails on or around the Lake. The recreation area has been a very good example of multiple use, allowing hikers, mountain bikers, and equestrians to use the trails together. Most of the trails extend from the recreation area into Indian Arm Provincial Park. Along the shore of the lake, there is a dock, a dog off-leash beach, and a designated swimming area.

Dogs on a leash are permitted on all trails at Buntzen Lake. There are also two designated off-leash areas, one of which includes an off-leash beach area, and an off-leash trail.

Some trails include:

=== The Halvor Lunden Trail (Eagle Ridge) ===
The Halvor Lunden Trail is named for a local prolific trail builder and maintainer who blazed many of the trails around Buntzen Lake in the 1980s and 90s. The trail is composed of the Lindsay Lake Loop, Swan Falls Loop and Dilly Dally Loop (described below).

=== Lindsay Lake Loop ===
Hiking time: 6–8 hours return. Distance: 15 km (9 mi). Elevation gain: 1,020 m (3,350 ft). This is the most popular of the three Halvor Lunden trails. It passes thought ancient mountain forests and has a number of viewpoints which overlook Vancouver. The trailhead is on Powerhouse Road, near the southeast corner of the South Beach parking area, and takes you up a steep climb of over 700m, passing the Polytrichum Lookout before reaching the "Lake district" which includes several small lakes and the larger Lindsay Lake.

=== Swan Falls Loop ===
Hiking time: 8–10 hours return. Distance: 20 km (12 mi). Elevation gain: 1,150 m (3,770 ft). The Swan Falls trailhead starts at the north end of Buntzen lake near North Beach. It is very steep in places and is only recommended for experienced and fit hikers. This trail forks into a number of trails between El Paso Junction and Lindsay Junction. The different trails give hikers the option of seeing the old growth forest of Eagle Ridge or pass by a number of tarns. North of Lindsay Junction is Eagle Peak with views of Mount Baker, Vancouver Island, the Fraser Valley, the Coquitlam watershed, Mount Seymour Provincial Park, and Indian Arm. Swan Falls was named for Gordon Swan by Dr. Simon Priest. Both were instrumental in trail building at Buntzen in the late 1970s on behalf of the Simon Fraser University Outdoor Club.

=== Dilly Dally Loop ===
Hiking time: 10–12 hours return. Distance: 25 km (16 mi). Elevation gain: 1,150 m (3,770 ft). This trail through high mountain forests is recommended for experienced and fit hikers only. The trailhead is located north of the Swan Falls trailhead, and takes the hiker further north to the Croker Lookout where there are fine views of the north end of Indian Arm, before climbing steeply to the top of Eagle Ridge. The trail continues south along the ridge over the 1200m Dill Dally peak before joining the Swan Falls trail.

=== Buntzen Lake Trail ===
Hiking time: 4–5 hours return. Distance: 8 km (5 mi). Elevation gain: 100 m (330 ft). This loop trail circles Buntzen Lake starting at Buntzen Creek Bridge at the east side of South Beach.

=== Energy Trail ===
This loop around the wooded knoll southwest of the South Beach boat launch includes views of Buntzen Lake and interpretive displays along the trail.

=== Diez Vistas Trail ===
Hiking time: 6–8 hours return. Distance: 7 km (4 mi) (one way). Elevation gain: 460 m (1,510 ft). The name of this trail, "ten views" in Spanish, refers to the many views of Vancouver area waterways and mountains visible from this trail.

=== Bear Claw, Saddle Ridge, Horseshoe Trails ===
These trails form loops in the cedar and hemlock forests on the steep slopes at the south west slopes of Buntzen Lake, providing access to the Diez Vistas Trail and the trail to Sasamat Lake.

=== Lakeview Trail ===
Hiking time: 5–6 hours return. Distance: 6 km (4 mi) (one way). Elevation gain: 150 m (490 ft). Portions of this trail are very steep. Equestrians and mountain bike riders should only use this trail if experienced in steep mountain terrain riding. Providing an alternative route along Buntzen Lake's western shore, this trail weaves its way along Pumphouse Road from the main entrance gate, then connects with the transmission line heading north before slipping into the dense forest that enfolds Buntzen Ridge. The trail ends where it joins the Old Buntzen Lake Trail near North Beach. This trail is opened to equestrians and mountain bike riders.

=== Academy Trail ===
Hiking time: 2–2.5 hours (one way). Distance: 4 km (2 mi). Elevation gain: 100 m (330 ft). This trail through fern-filled forests is open to equestrians and mountain bike riders.

=== Old Buntzen Lake Trail ===
Hiking time: 45 minutes (one way). Distance: 1.5 km (0.9 mi). Elevation gain: 20 m (70 ft). This trail was used to circumnavigate Buntzen Lake before the suspension bridge was built which the new Buntzen Lake Trail traverses.

=== Eagle Bluff Trail ===
Leads up from the Academy Trail to Vista Point, a viewpoint overlooking the lake. Confusingly named the same as Eagleridge Bluffs in West Vancouver.

=== White Rock Trail ===
Leads from El Paso Junction on the Halvor Lunden Trail to the old logging road network on Eagle Ridge. A viewpoint partway along the trail overlooks Coquitlam.

=== Fishing ===
Rainbow trouts are quite regularly stocked in this lake. Fishing can be done from the pier, viewpoint, middle beach or anywhere from shorelines around the lake. Kayaking can also be a great method to catch some trouts in this lake.

== Buntzen Lake filming location filmography ==
- Roxanne (1987)
- The People Across the Lake (1988)
- It (1990 TV miniseries)
- The X-Files Season 1 Episode 4 Conduit (1993)
- The X-Files Season 3 Episode 22 Quagmire (1996)
- Highlander: The Series (1992–1998)
- Stargate SG-1 Season 2 Episode 2 In the Line of Duty (1998)
- The Blair Witch Project (1999)
- Lake Placid (1999)
- Dark Angel (2000–2002)
- Freddy vs. Jason (2003)
- Devour (2005)
- Smallville Season 5 Episode 4 Aqua (2005)
- Supernatural Season 1 Episode 3 Dead in the Water (2005)
- Three O'Clock (2005)
- The 4400 (2004–2007)
- Hot Rod (2007)
- Pathfinder (2007)
- Eureka (2006–2012)
- Travelers (TV series) (2016 series) Season 2 Episode 7 17 Minutes

== Wildlife ==
- American black bear
- Black-tail deer
- American crow
- Coyote
- Squirrel
- Trout
- Cougar
- Bobcat
- Otter

== Flora ==
- Ferns
- Stinging nettle
- Skunk cabbage
- Western red cedar
- Hemlock
- Douglas fir
- Alder

== Climate ==
Climate data for Buntzen Lake
Month	Jan	Feb	Mar	Apr	May	Jun	Jul	Aug	Sep	Oct	Nov	Dec	Year
Record high °C (°F)	12.2 (54.0)	12.8 (55.0)	17.0 (62.6)	25.0 (77.0)	30.0 (86.0)	33.9 (93.0)	33.3 (91.9)	32.8 (91.0)	29.4 (84.9)	19.4 (66.9)	14.5 (58.1)	15.0 (59.0)	33.9 (93.0)
Mean daily maximum °C (°F)	3.9 (39.0)	6.4 (43.5)	8.5 (47.3)	13.1 (55.6)	16.5 (61.7)	19.5 (67.1)	23.1 (73.6)	22.4 (72.3)	18.1 (64.6)	12.7 (54.9)	7.4 (45.3)	5.4 (41.7)	13.1 (55.6)
Daily mean °C (°F)	1.8 (35.2)	3.8 (38.8)	5.1 (41.2)	8.7 (47.7)	11.7 (53.1)	14.7 (58.5)	17.7 (63.9)	17.6 (63.7)	14.1 (57.4)	9.7 (49.5)	5.2 (41.4)	3.2 (37.8)	9.4 (49.0)
Mean daily minimum °C (°F)	−0.5 (31.1)	1.1 (34.0)	1.8 (35.2)	4.2 (39.6)	6.8 (44.2)	10.0 (50.0)	12.2 (54.0)	12.7 (54.9)	10.0 (50.0)	6.6 (43.9)	2.9 (37.2)	1.0 (33.8)	5.7 (42.3)
Record low °C (°F)	−14.0 (6.8)	−6.7 (19.9)	−6.1 (21.0)	−3.9 (25.0)	−1.1 (30.0)	3.9 (39.0)	6.7 (44.1)	6.1 (43.0)	1.7 (35.1)	−2.2 (28.0)	−5.6 (21.9)	−10.8 (12.6)	−14.0 (6.8)
Average precipitation mm (inches)	395.2 (15.56)	314.1 (12.37)	256.4 (10.09)	175.2 (6.90)	212.9 (8.38)	115.9 (4.56)	70.4 (2.77)	97.8 (3.85)	167.3 (6.59)	318.5 (12.54)	390.0 (15.35)	486.8 (19.17)	3,000.5 (118.13)
Average snowfall cm (inches)	28.7 (11.3)	6.3 (2.5)	8.1 (3.2)	0.0 (0.0)	0.0 (0.0)	0.0 (0.0)	0.0 (0.0)	0.0 (0.0)	0.0 (0.0)	0.0 (0.0)	2.0 (0.8)	15.3 (6.0)	60.4 (23.8)
Average precipitation days	20	18	18	15	13	12	8	9	12	17	18	22	182
Average snowy days	4	1	1	0	0	0	0	0	0	0	0	3	9
Source: Environment and Climate Change Canada

== See also ==
- List of lakes of British Columbia
