= Indian Arm =

Fjord in British Columbia

- Halkomelem: səl̓ilw̓ət
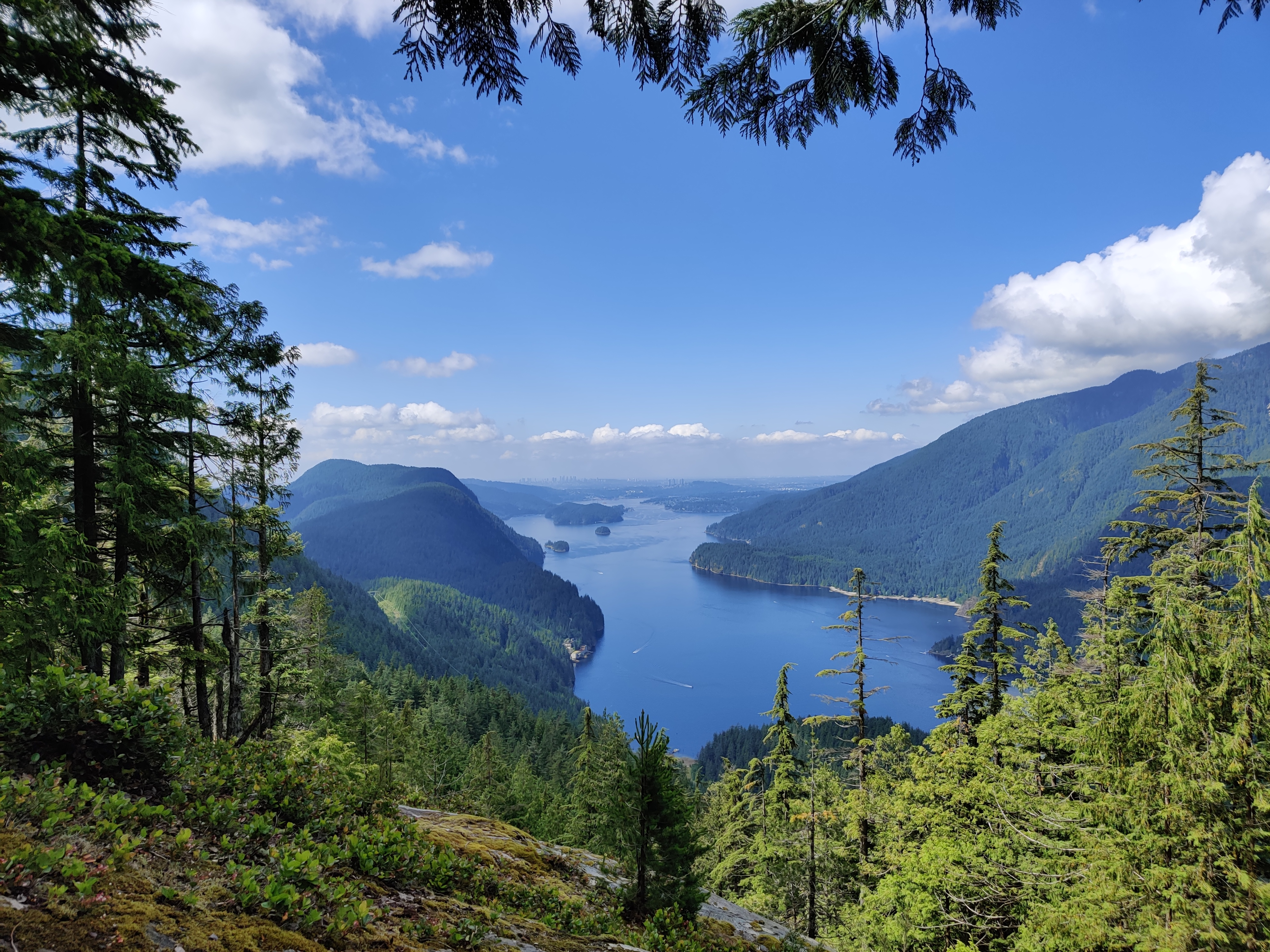
- A southward view of Indian Arm, taken along the Dilly Dally Loop Trail in Indian Arm Provincial Park

- Location within British Columbia Location within Canada

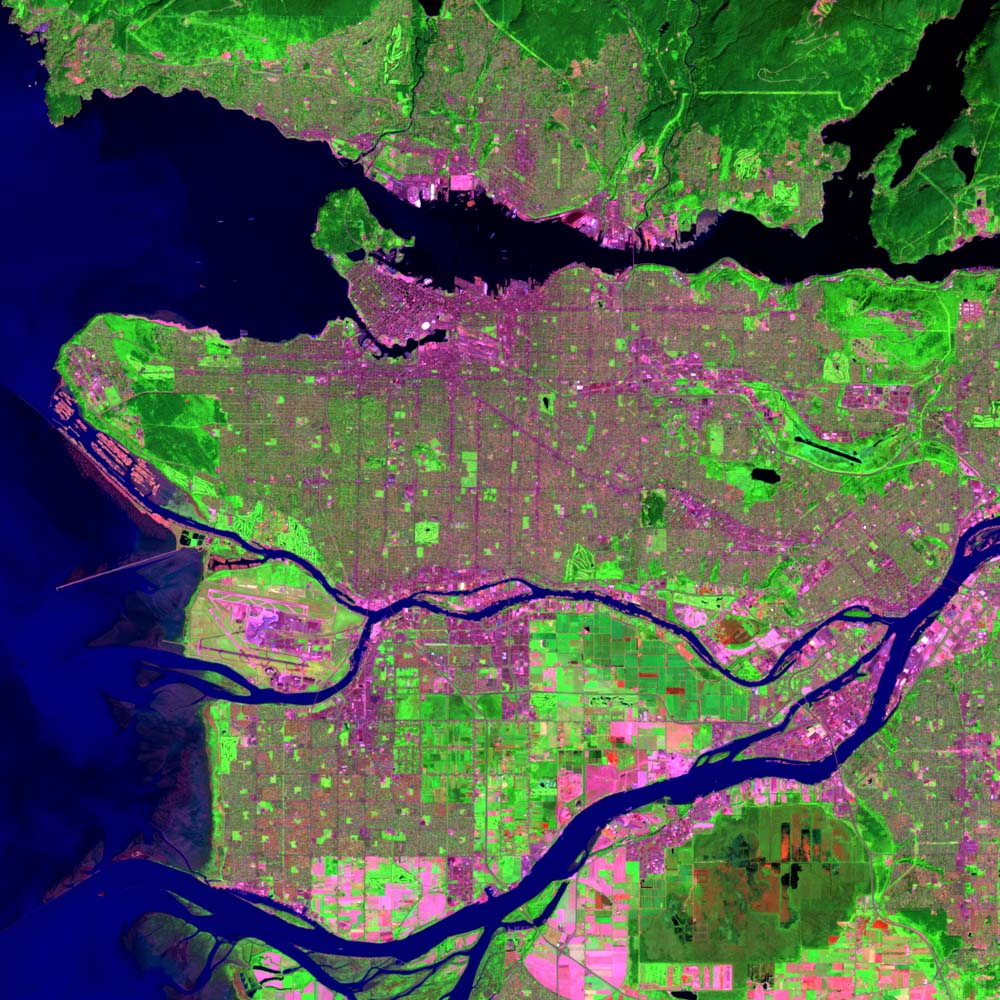
- Satellite photo of the Vancouver region; Indian Arm is in the upper right corner.
- Location: North Shore Mountains; Vancouver, British Columbia, Canada
- Coordinates: 49°22′37″N 122°52′41″W
- Type: Fjord
- Part of: Burrard Inlet
- Primary inflows: Indian River, Coquitlam River via Buntzen Power Plant
- Max. length: 20 km (12 mi)
- Max. width: 0.5 to 2 kilometres (0.31 to 1.24 mi)
- Average depth: 120 metres (390 ft)
- Max. depth: 218 metres (715 ft)
- Islands: Twin Islands, Croker Island, Racoon Island
- Settlements: North Vancouver; Belcarra

Indian Arm (Halkomelem: səl̓ilw̓ət) is a steep-sided glacial fjord in southwestern British Columbia. Formed during the last Ice Age, it extends due north from Burrard Inlet, between the communities of Belcarra (to the east) and the District of North Vancouver (to the west), then on into mountainous wilderness. The name səl̓ilw̓ət is the Halkomelem word for the inlet itself, and from which the Tsleil-Waututh, Halkomelem 'people of the inlet' derive their name. Later Burrard Inlet and the opening of Indian Arm was mapped by Captain George Vancouver and fully explored days later by Dionisio Alcalá Galiano in June 1792.

== Geography ==
Indian Arm is a salt-water fjord that extends about 20 km (12 mi) north from Burrard Inlet. There are no crossings, and road access is limited to the communities on the southern portion of the arm. The steep mountain slopes are so impassable that most have seen no development, despite the proximity to a major city. Indian River, marked by a small dock at the north end of the arm, can be reached by boat from the Vancouver area or by a logging road from Squamish.

== Scenery and attractions ==
The slopes along Indian Arm are either heavily forested or sheer granite cliffs. The inlet is narrow and the mountains rise steeply on both sides directly from the sea.

There are several waterfalls, with the largest being Granite Falls at the north end on the east side. Spray of Pearls Falls at Wigwam Creek is in the north west corner, and Silver Falls is on the western side at Elsay Creek. There are also numerous unnamed seasonal waterfalls running over the rocky cliff walls that can best be viewed during spring run off. In winter, frozen ice-falls can be viewed. Granite Falls was formerly an operating granite rock quarry providing stone for Vancouver's construction needs and breakwaters.

Wildlife viewing can include seals, bald eagles, herons, and black bears. A large pink salmon run in odd-numbered years starts in July and continues to October; salmon and bear viewing opportunities concentrate at the Indian River estuary in the northwest corner of the inlet.

=== Recreation and parks ===
Say Nuth Khaw Yum Provincial Park includes large parts of both shores of the fjord, as well as Racoon and Twin Islands. This park is 6,826 ha (16,870 acres) in total. There are wilderness campgrounds at sea level at Bishop Creek (west side), Granite Falls, and Twin Islands. The park is popular with boaters and kayakers, and is also visited by charter boat day tours leaving from Granville Island, Port Moody, or Coal Harbour. Divers can visit the shallow water surrounding Racoon and Twin Islands.

The Say Nuth Khaw Yum Heritage Park / Indian Arm Provincial Park was created in 1995 as part of the BC Government's Lower Mainland Nature Legacy Program. The park is located within the core of the Tsleil-Waututh Nation Traditional Territory.

A management agreement was signed between the Tsleil-Waututh First Nation and the Government of BC in 1998. The management board has equal representation from the Tsleil-Waututh First Nation and the BC Government to co-manage all aspects of the park and heritage area.

A rough wilderness hiking trail around the perimeter of Indian Arm was completed in 2003. It was created over many years by engineer and trailbuilder, Don McPherson; he also created the Grouse Grind hiking trail up the side of Grouse Mountain.

The south-eastern part of the Say Nuth Khaw Yum Provincial Park is adjacent to and partly surrounds the BC Hydro Buntzen Lake Recreation Area. təmtəmíxʷtən/Belcarra Regional Park is managed by Metro Vancouver Regional Parks; this park surrounds Bedwell Bay on the mid-western side of Indian Arm, and includes the area around Sasamat Lake. The Baden-Powell Trail is challenging but well-maintained and well-marked. It originates at Panorama Park in Deep Cove, passing along the slopes of the North Shore Mountains on the western side of Indian Arm to its western terminus in Horseshoe Bay, West Vancouver.

Other parks around the shores of eastern Burrard Inlet and Indian Arm include: Cates Park and Panorama Park in the District of North Vancouver, Barnet Marine Park in Burnaby, Rocky Point Park (which includes a boat launch), Inlet Park and Tidal Park in Port Moody, and Thwaytes Landing Metro Park Reserve.

=== Other places reachable by water ===
Heading north from Deep Cove one hits Woodlands, which is an established beachfront community.

There are associated cabins, beaches and areas as one heads north: Thwaites, Alder Point, Bergs, Croker Island, Indian River, Bedwell Bay, Belcarra, Anmore, Buntzen Bay, Jug Island, and Whiskey Cove. Also on the eastern shore is the ghost town of Iron Bay.

==== Buntzen Generating Station ====
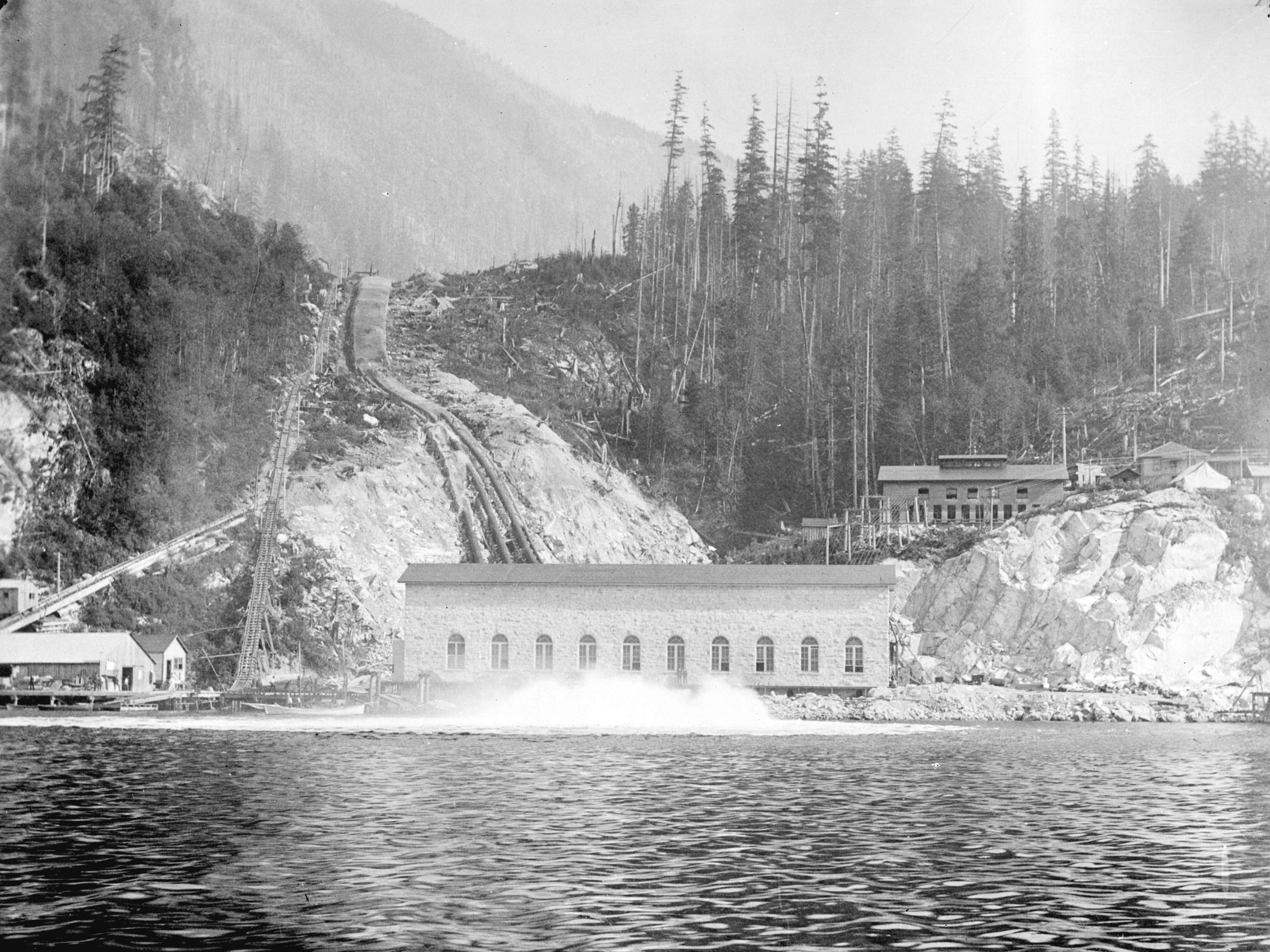
Buntzen No. 1 before additions 49.3751748°N 122.8687525°W

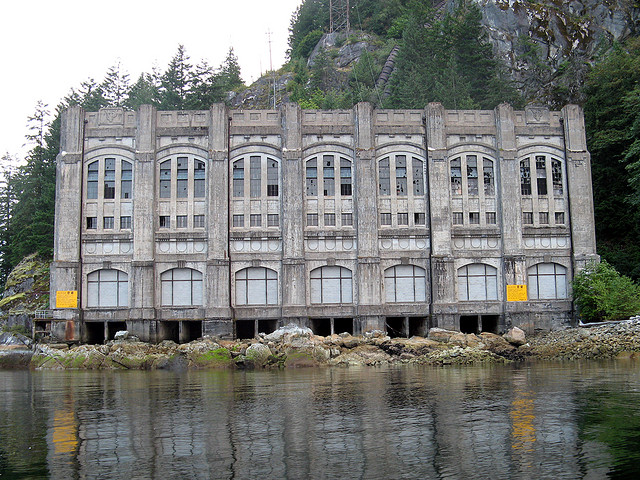
Buntzen No. 2 power plant 49.3701245°N 122.8753319°W

There are two century old powerhouses along the eastern shore of the arm. Water from Coquitlam Lake flows through a 3,894 m (12,775 ft) long tunnel to Buntzen Lake, approximately 150 m (490 ft) above the tide line in Indian Arm. Boilerplate penstocks direct water from Buntzen Lake down to the two powerhouses on the shores of Indian Arm.

Buntzen No. 1 was built in 1903 by the Vancouver City Light and Power Company to provide electricity for the Vancouver area's streetcars. It used four 1,500 kW generators and by 1912 three additional 5,000 kW units were installed. The north end of the original four unit powerhouse at Buntzen No. 1 was demolished in 1950 and a new building, a 55,000 kW unit 1 generator and a larger turbine were added in 1951.

Buntzen No. 2 was designed by the English architect Francis Rattenbury. It was built in 1912, 0.40 km (1/4 mi) south of Buntzen No. 1 by British Columbia Electric Railway and produced 26,700 kW of power. One of Buntzen No. 2's three pelton wheels was shut down in 1972 leaving a capacity of 17,800 kW in operation.

Buntzen No. 1 was shut down during 2010–2011 to complete a turbine runner replacement project. The stations are unmanned, operated by remote control from BC Hydro's System Control facility atop Burnaby Mountain. In 2015 BC Hydro lists capacity of the two powerhouses at 76.8 MW.

There is confusion in maps and photographs about which site is Buntzen No. 1 and which is Buntzen No. 2. Buntzen No. 1 is to the north and has four buildings, with the 1951 generator addition on the north end of the powerhouse and the transformer building uphill. The site is not very appealing except for the ornate granite addition to the south end of the powerhouse with "Vancouver Power" carved in stone. Buntzen No. 2 is 300 m (1,000 ft) to the south and is all contained within one beautiful building which hasn't changed significantly since 1912.

==== Wigwam Inn ====
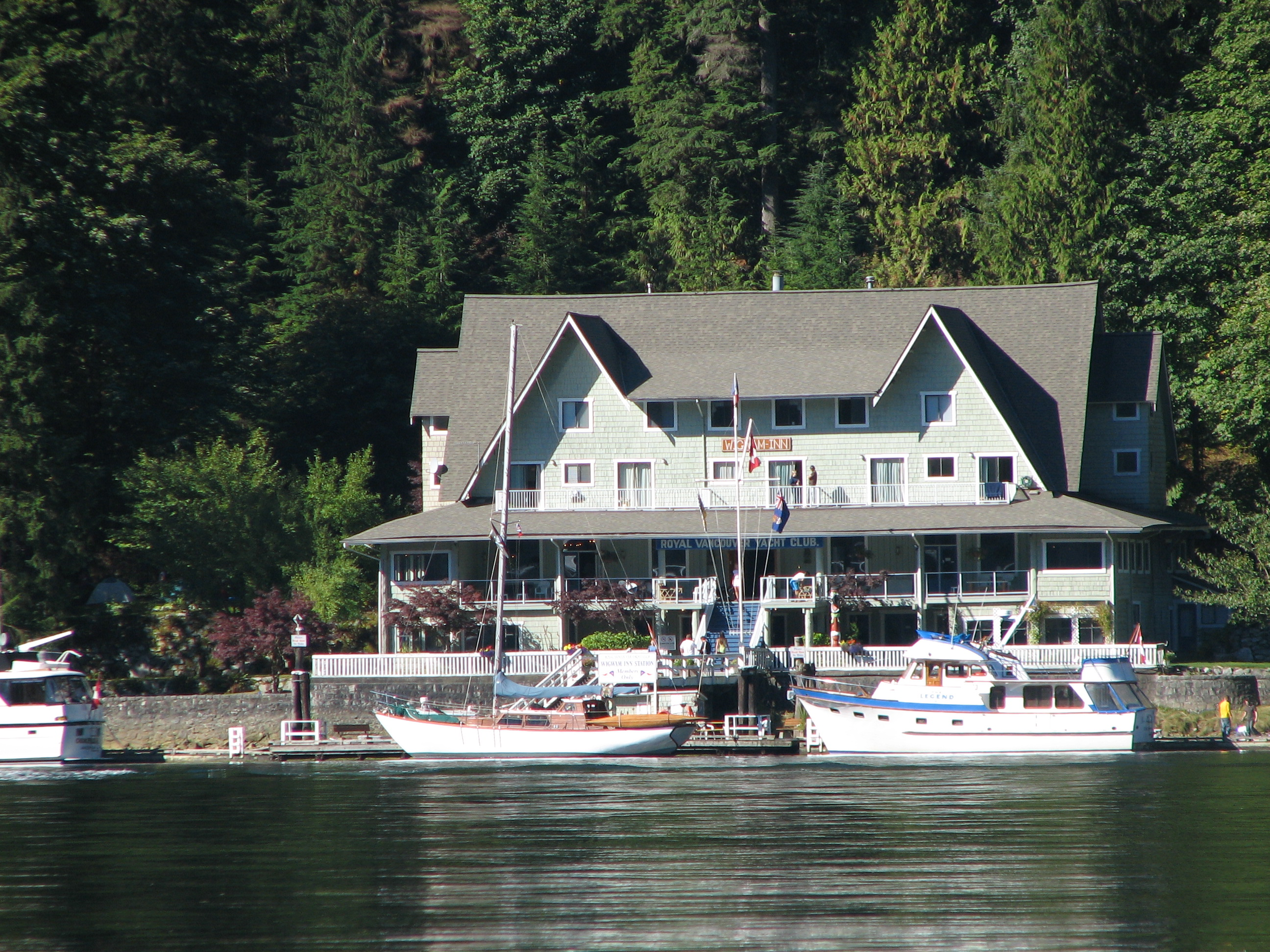
Wigwam Inn

The Wigwam Inn, located at the north end of Indian Arm, originally opened as a luxury German Biergarten resort and fishing lodge in 1910. A daily steamship route, using the sternwheeler Skeena, brought customers and supplies to the inn. The property was operated by Gustav Konstantin von Alvensleben during its glory days before World War I, and by other operators until 1963. The property was then sold several times, with a somewhat checkered history, including a stint as a gambling casino, which led to a raid by the Royal Canadian Mounted Police. Famous guests over the years included two of the richest men in the world: oil tycoon John D. Rockefeller and the great-grandson of fur trade millionaire John Jacob Astor.

The Inn is currently owned and operated by the Royal Vancouver Yacht Club as an outstation for club members. There is no public moorage available at the Wigwam docks; reciprocal privileges are not available to members of any other yacht clubs. There are various rumours that Al Capone hid out at the Wigwam, that murders were committed there, and that it might be haunted.
