= Sasamat Lake =

Lake in British Columbia, Canada

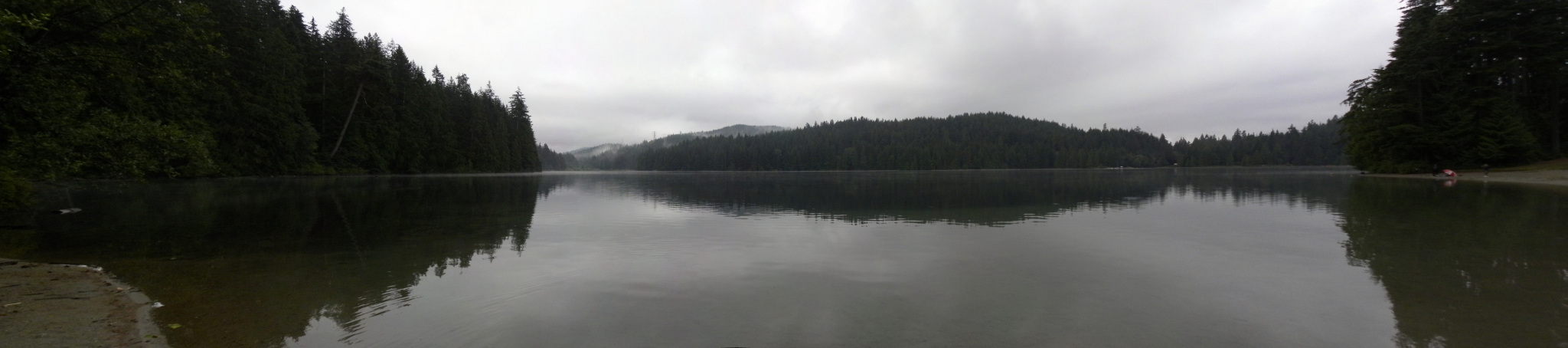

- Location within British Columbia
- Location: Belcarra Regional Park, British Columbia
- Coordinates: 49°19′16″N 122°53′21″W
- Basin countries: Canada
- Surface area: 0.45 km^{2} (0.17 sq mi)
- Average depth: 18 m (59 ft)
- Max. depth: 33 m (108 ft)
- Surface elevation: 31 m (102 ft)

Sasamat Lake is located east of Bedwell Bay, which is off the Indian Arm of Burrard Inlet. It is also within Belcarra Regional Park in Port Moody, British Columbia. It is one of the warmest lakes in Greater Vancouver. At the south end of the lake there is a floating bridge, used for fishing or swimming. At the north end of the lake is White Pine Beach. Seasonal transit service is provided by TransLink to White Pine Beach.

== See also ==
- List of lakes of British Columbia
