= White Pine Beach =

Beach in British Columbia, Canada

Coordinates: 49.320113°N 122.899027°W

White Pine Beach is a beach on Sasamat Lake in Belcarra Regional Park in Port Moody, British Columbia. TransLink provides seasonal bus service.
