= Burnaby Heights =

Neighourhood in Burnaby, British Columbia

Coordinates: 49.2840°N 123.0137°W

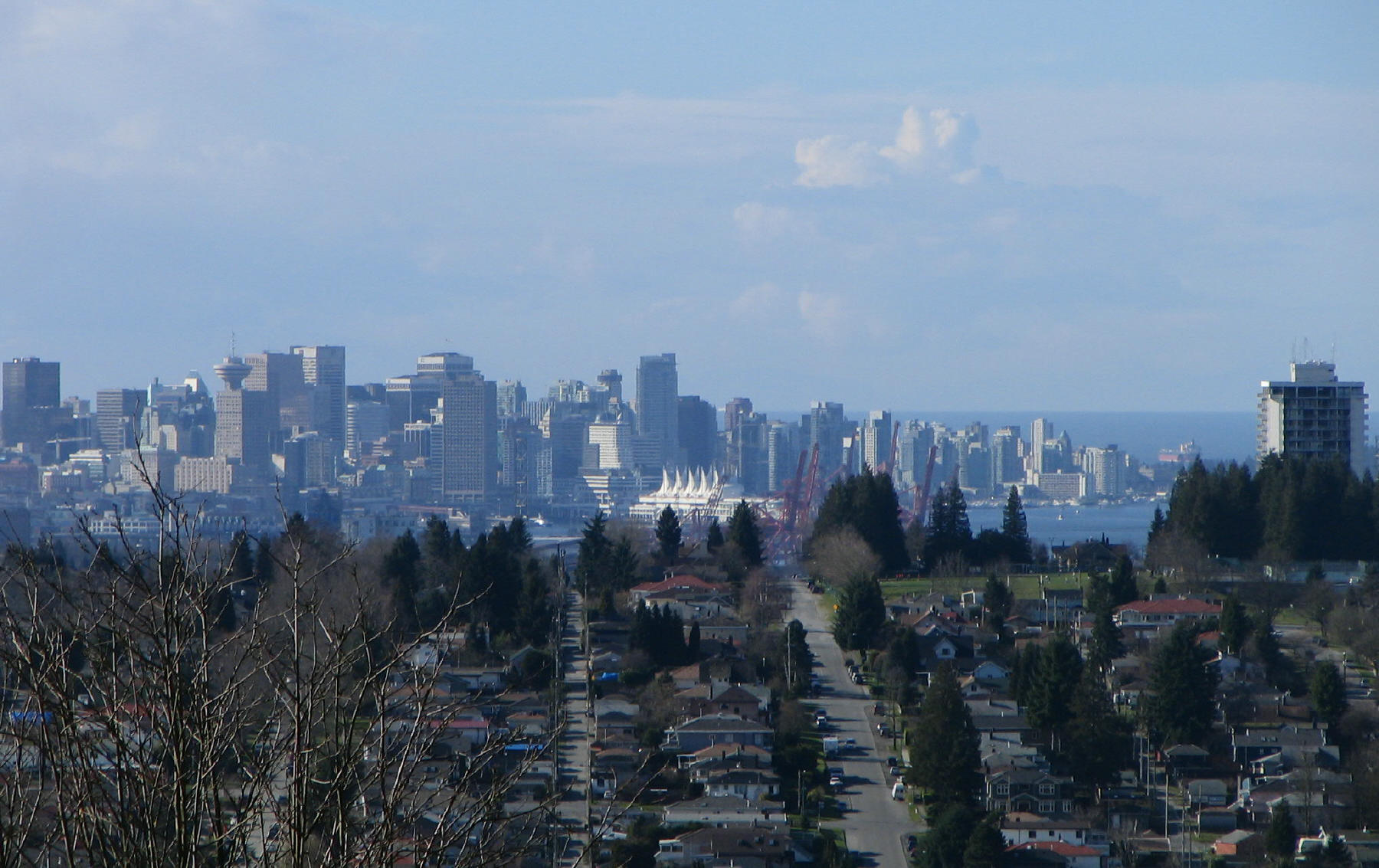
The Heights as seen from Capitol Hill, with Downtown Vancouver in the distance

Burnaby Heights, often referred to as The Heights, is a residential neighbourhood in North Burnaby. British Columbia, Canada. It is bounded by Boundary Road to the west, Gamma Avenue to the east and Hastings Street to the south. Its northern edge facing the North Shore Mountains comes down rather steeply to the shores of Burrard Inlet.

Many community events, such as Hats Off Day, Halloween on the Heights and Light up the Heights are held annually.

== Heritage homes ==
Burnaby Heights has a significant number of heritage houses.

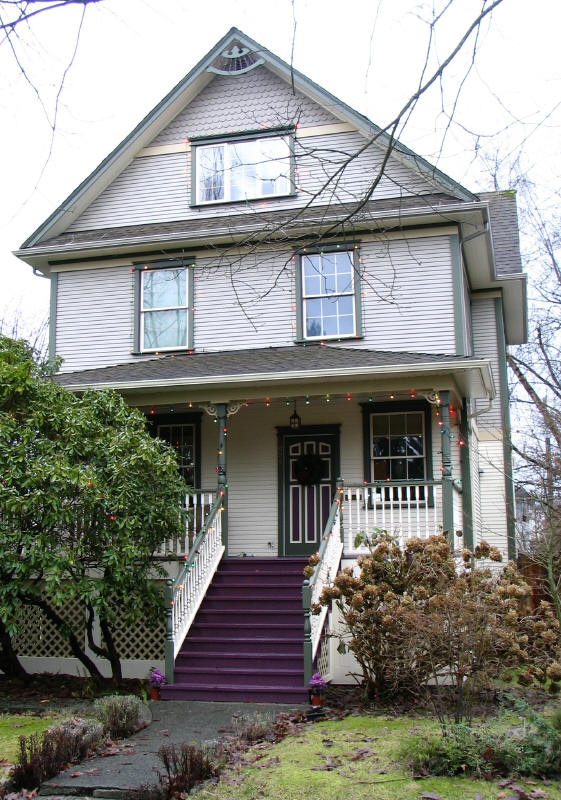
A heritage house on Cambridge St. and MacDonald Ave.

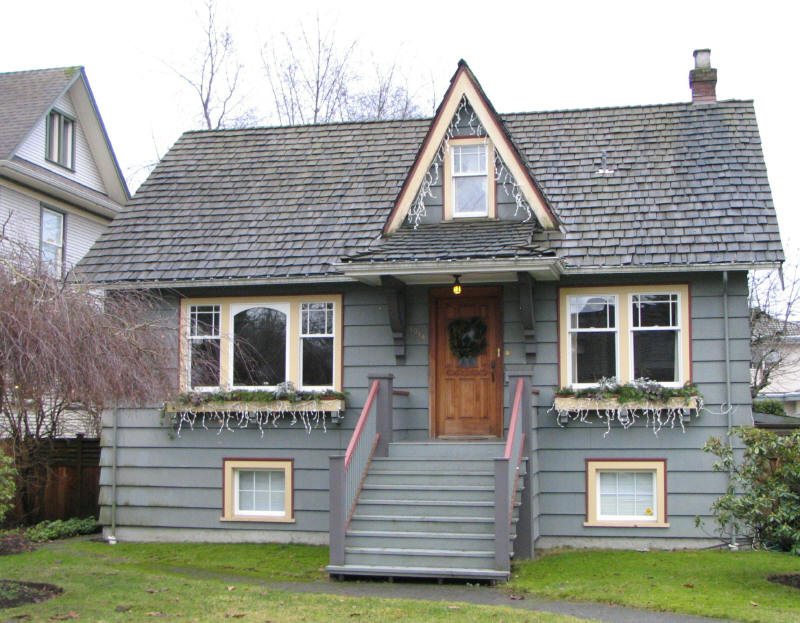
A heritage house on Cambridge St. and MacDonald Ave.

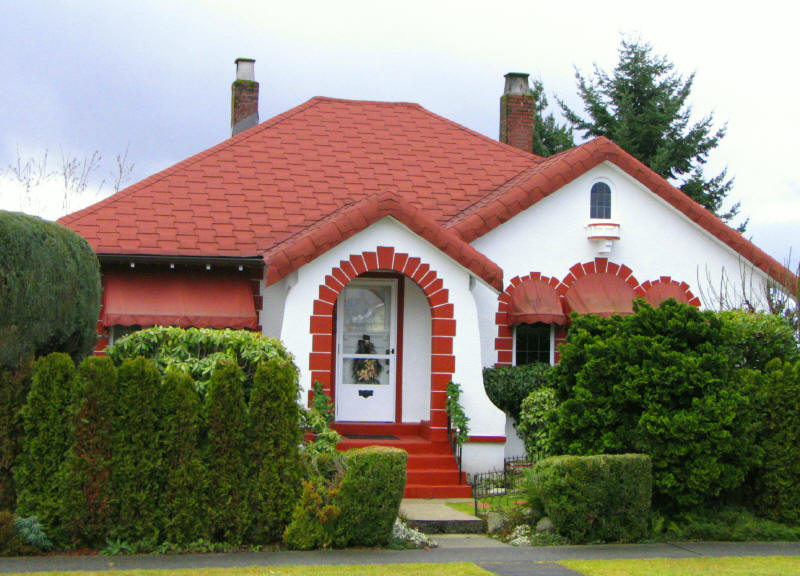
A heritage house on MacDonald Ave. north of Cambridge St.

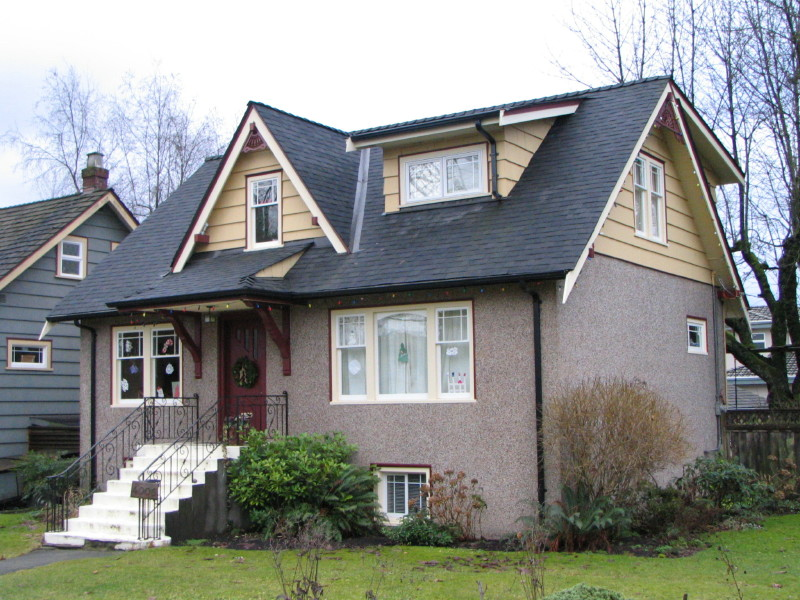
A heritage house on Cambridge St. and MacDonald Ave.

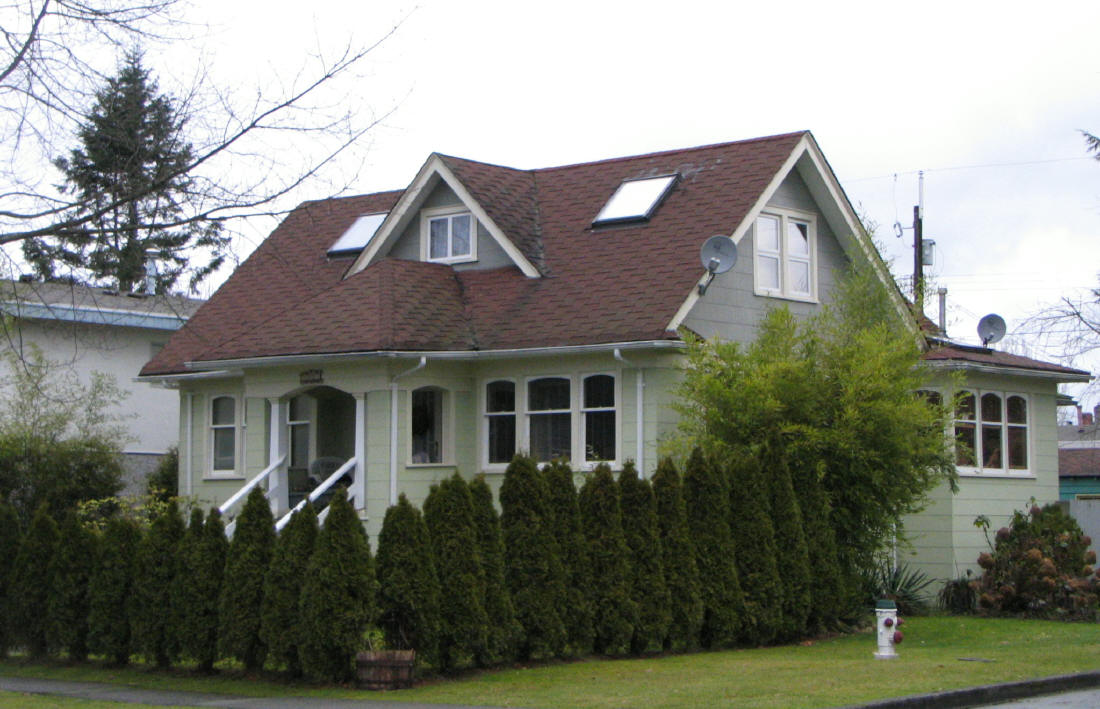
A heritage house on Cambridge St. and MacDonald Ave.

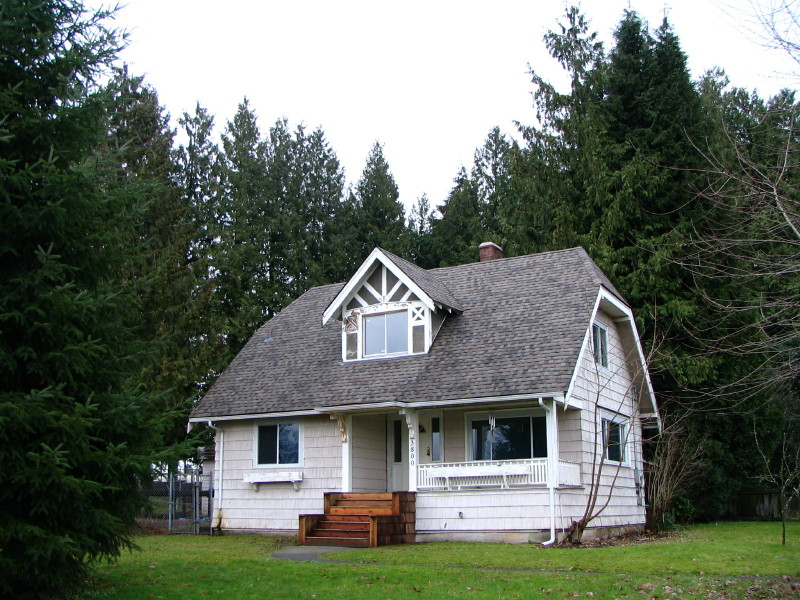
A heritage house on Trinity St. and Esmond Ave.

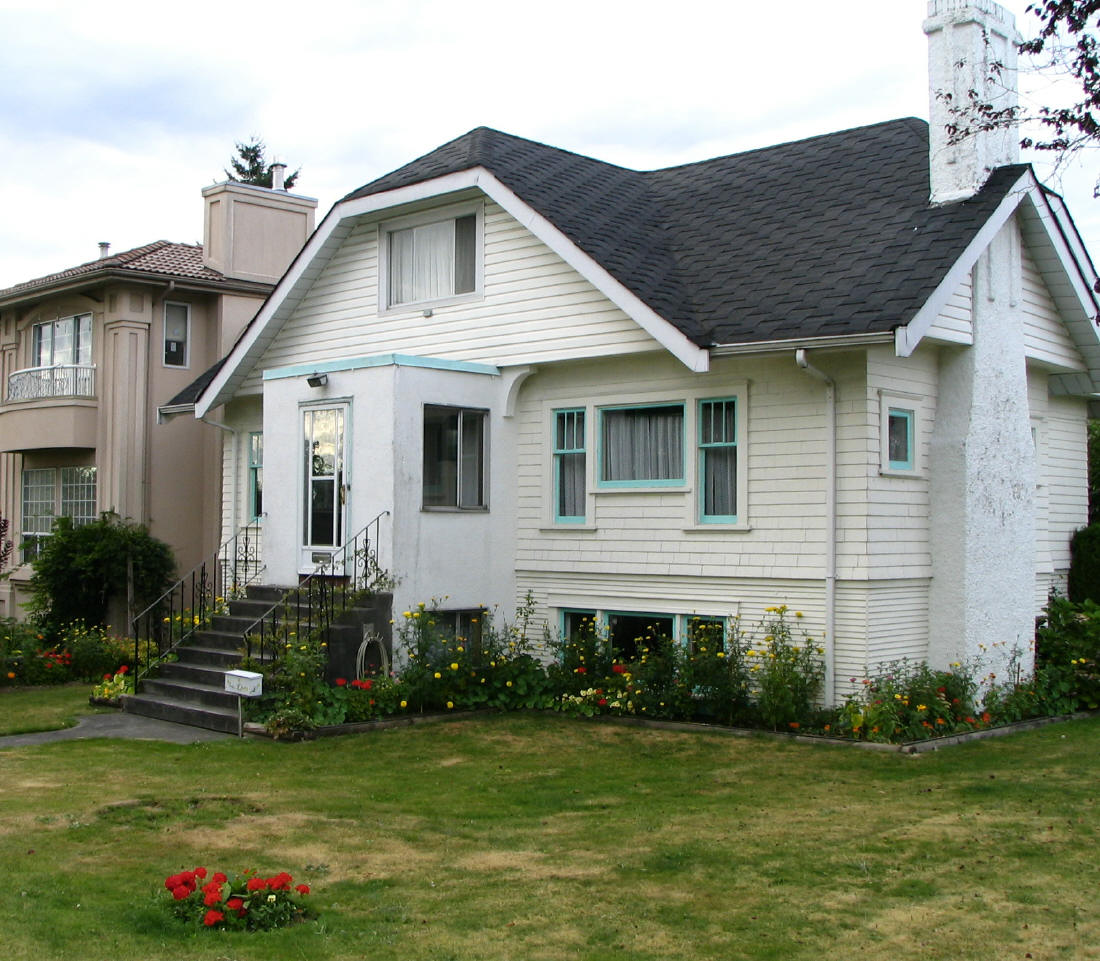
A heritage house on Triumph St. between Esmond Ave. and Boundary Rd.

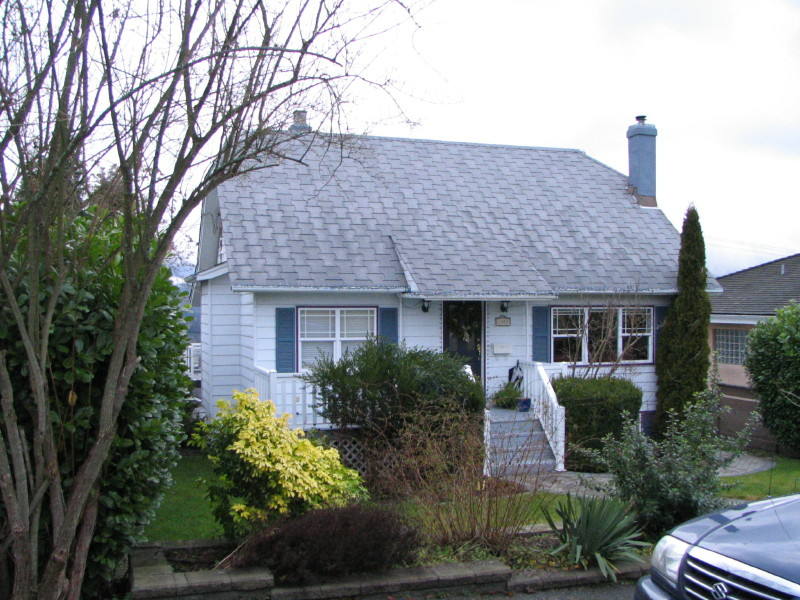
A pre-war house on Trinity St. near Ingleton Ave.

== Christmas on the Heights ==
It has become an annual tradition to light up the local stretch of Hastings Street during the Christmas season. The lights are installed and maintained by the City of Burnaby and light up the heights from November to March each year.

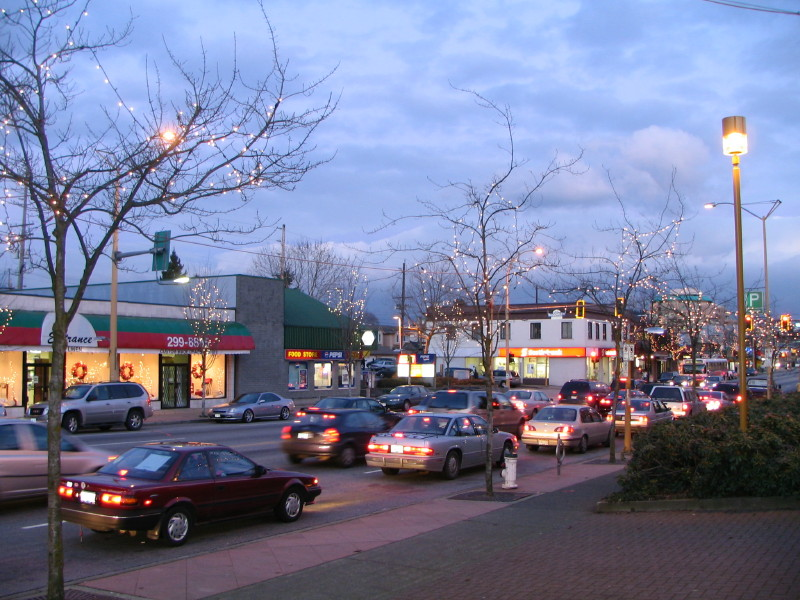

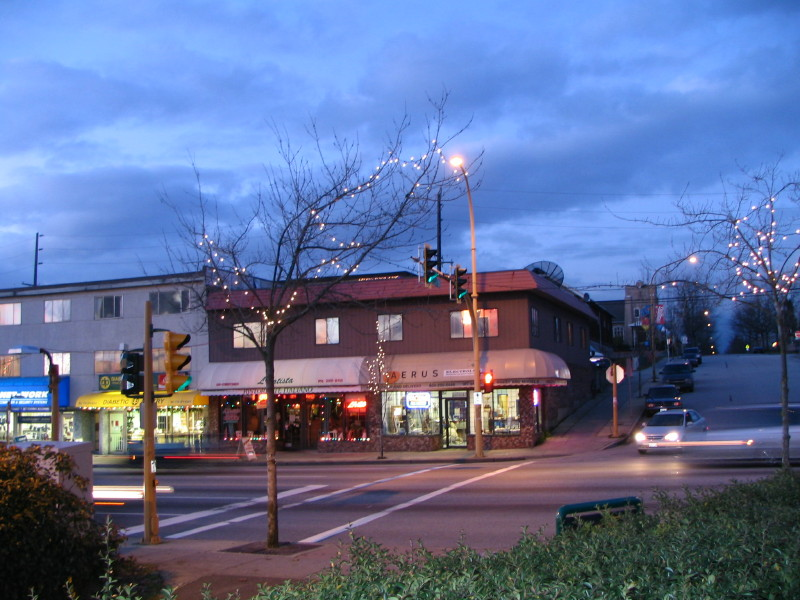

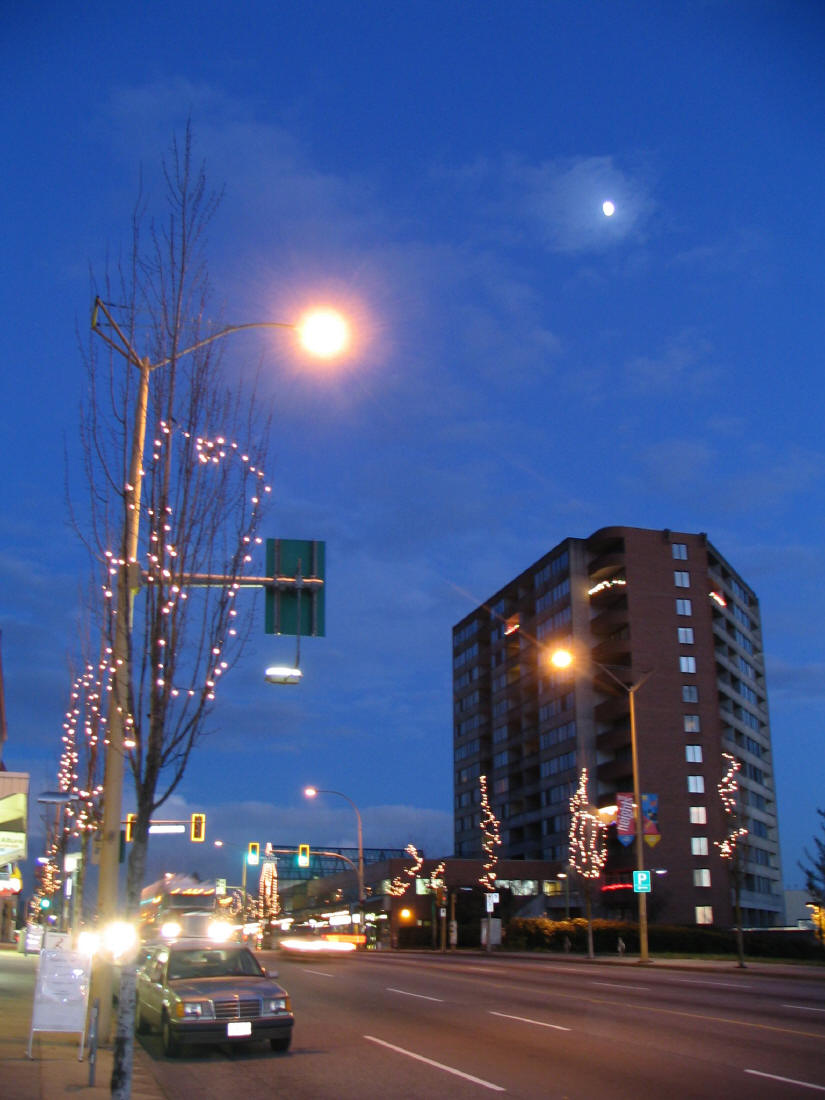

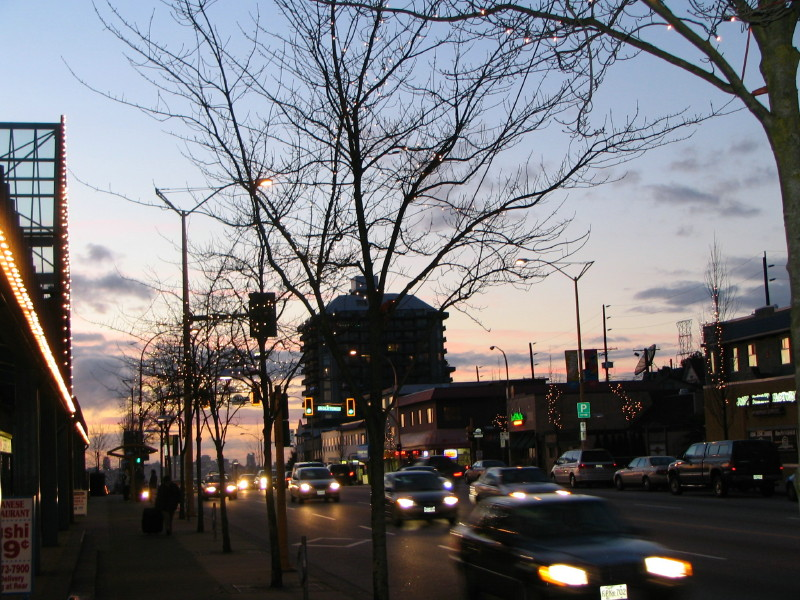
