= Cumulative elevation gain =

Metric for climbing

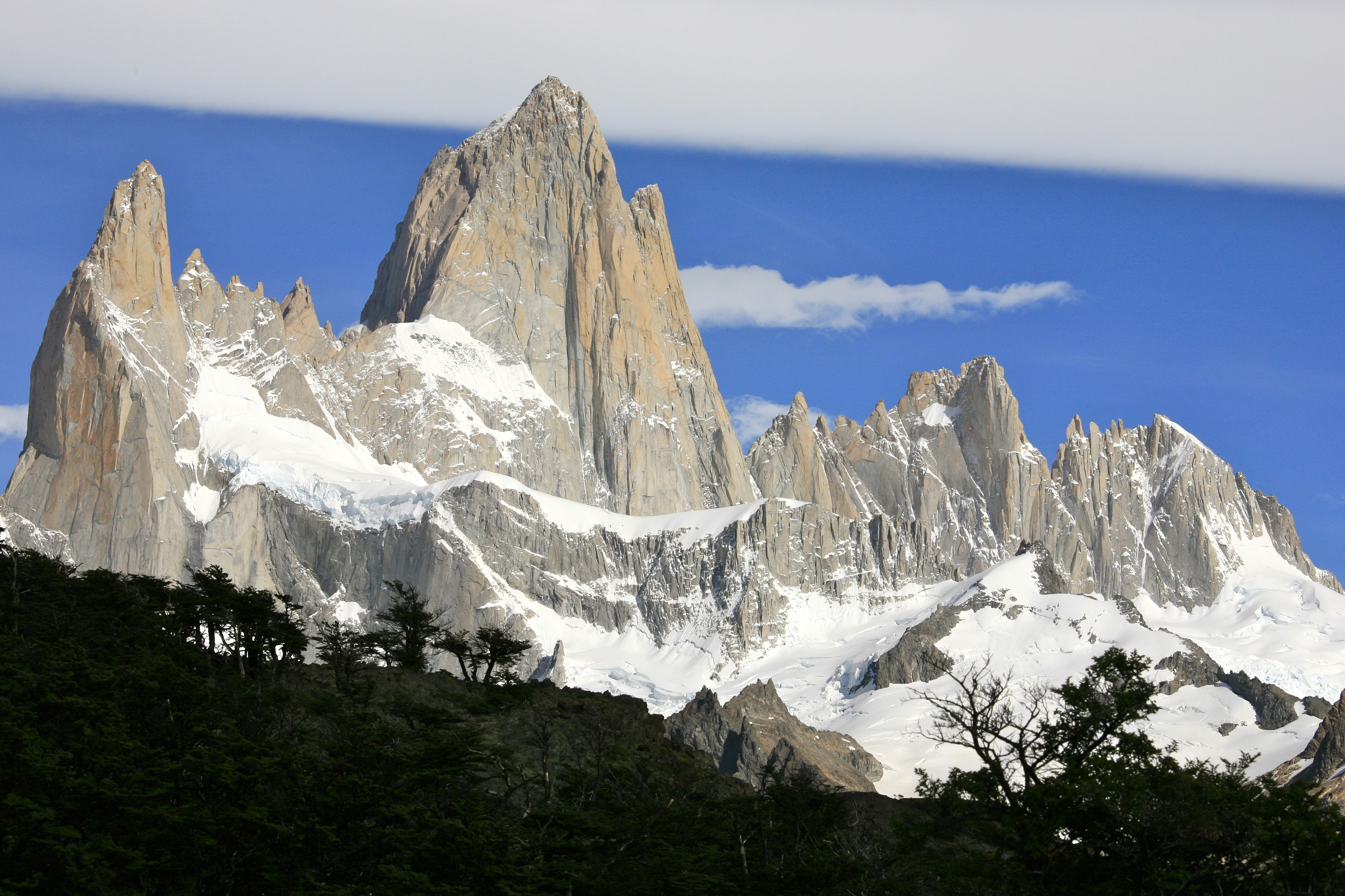
The seven peaks of the 'Fitz Roy traverse is one of the hardest mountain traverses with a CAG of circa 4,000 metres (13,000 ft)

In cycling, hiking, mountaineering and running, the term cumulative elevation gain (or cumulative gain) is the total of every gain in elevation made throughout a journey. Elevation losses (i.e. periods when the person is descending) are not counted or offset against this measure. Cumulative elevation gain, and the total distance of the journey, are two key metrics used to quantify the physical demands of a journey.

== Calculation ==
No matter the shape of the hills, as long as they are each 100 vertical feet tall, then if one were to hike up each hill, the cumulative elevation gain would be 5 × (100 feet (30 m)) = 500 feet (150 m). The downhill sections are not counted.

In the simplest case of a journey where a climber only travels up on their way to a summit, the cumulative elevation gain (CAG) is the difference between the summit and starting elevation. For example, if they start a climb at an elevation of 1,000 feet (300 m) and continue up to a summit of 5,000 feet (1,500 m) then their CAG while standing on the summit is 4,000 feet (1,200 m) (i.e 5,000 ft less 1,000 ft). In descending from the summit to return to their start they don't have to make any other gains in elevation (i.e. it is just continuously down), so their total CAG for the journey stays at 4,000 feet (1,200 m), which is the total of the vertical distance they climbed.

Now take the case of a journey where a climber travels across several summits with more "ups-and-downs". For example, consider two mountains whose summits are both at 5,000 feet (1,500 m) in elevation, and between them is a low point at an elevation of 2,000 feet (610 m). If a climber starts their journey at an elevation of 1,000 feet (300 m), their CAG is 4,000 feet (1,200 m) by the time they reach the first summit (i.e. 5,000 ft less 1,000 ft). They then drop down to the 2,000 feet (610 m) low point between the summits and have to gain another 3,000 feet (910 m) to get to the top of the second summit. On the second summit, the climber has a CAG of 7,000 feet (2,100 m) (i.e 4,000 ft plus another 3,000 ft). To return home, they have to drop back down to the low point at 2,000 feet (610 m) and then gain another 3,000 feet (910 m) to get back to the first summit. Now they have a CAG of 10,000 feet (3,000 m) (i.e 4,000 ft plus 3,000 ft plus another 3,000 ft). In descending from the first summit to return to their start they don't have to make any other gains in elevation (i.e. it is just continuously down), and their total CAG for the journey stays at 10,000 feet (3,000 m).

CAG captures the effect that traveling on terrain with a lot of "ups-and-downs" will result in a lot of vertical climbing.

== Devices ==
Cumulative elevation gain can be recorded and calculated automatically using GPS devices such as Garmin or Strava.

== See also ==
- Naismith's rule
- Traverse (climbing)
- Topographic prominence
