= Indian River (British Columbia) =

- Location of the mouth of the river in British Columbia

Location
- Country: Canada
- Province: British Columbia
- Land District: New Westminster Land District
- Regional Districts: Greater Vancouver Regional District, Squamish-Lillooet Regional District

Physical characteristics
- Source
  - location: Squamish-Lillooet Regional District
  - coordinates: 49°38′36″N 123°02′23″W
  - elevation: 801 m (2,628 ft)
- Mouth: Indian Arm
  - location: Burrard Inlet, Lower Mainland
  - coordinates: 49°28′00″N 122°53′00″W
  - elevation: 0 m (0 ft)

Basin features
- River system: Pacific Ocean drainage basin

The Indian River is a river in the Lower Mainland region of British Columbia, Canada. It is in the Pacific Ocean drainage basin, and is a tributary of Indian Arm.

== Course ==
The river begins at Mount Baldwin in Squamish-Lillooet Regional District. It flows south and reaches its mouth at Indian Arm, which flows via Burrard Inlet to the Pacific Ocean. An electric power transmission line to Whistler follows the river valley.

== Tributaries ==
- Hixon Creek (left)
- Forestry Creek (right)
- Brandt Creek (left)
- Meslilloet Creek (left)

== See also ==
- List of rivers of British Columbia
