= Burrard Inlet =

Coastal fjord in southwestern British Columbia, Canada

- səl̓ilw̓ət (Halkomelem)
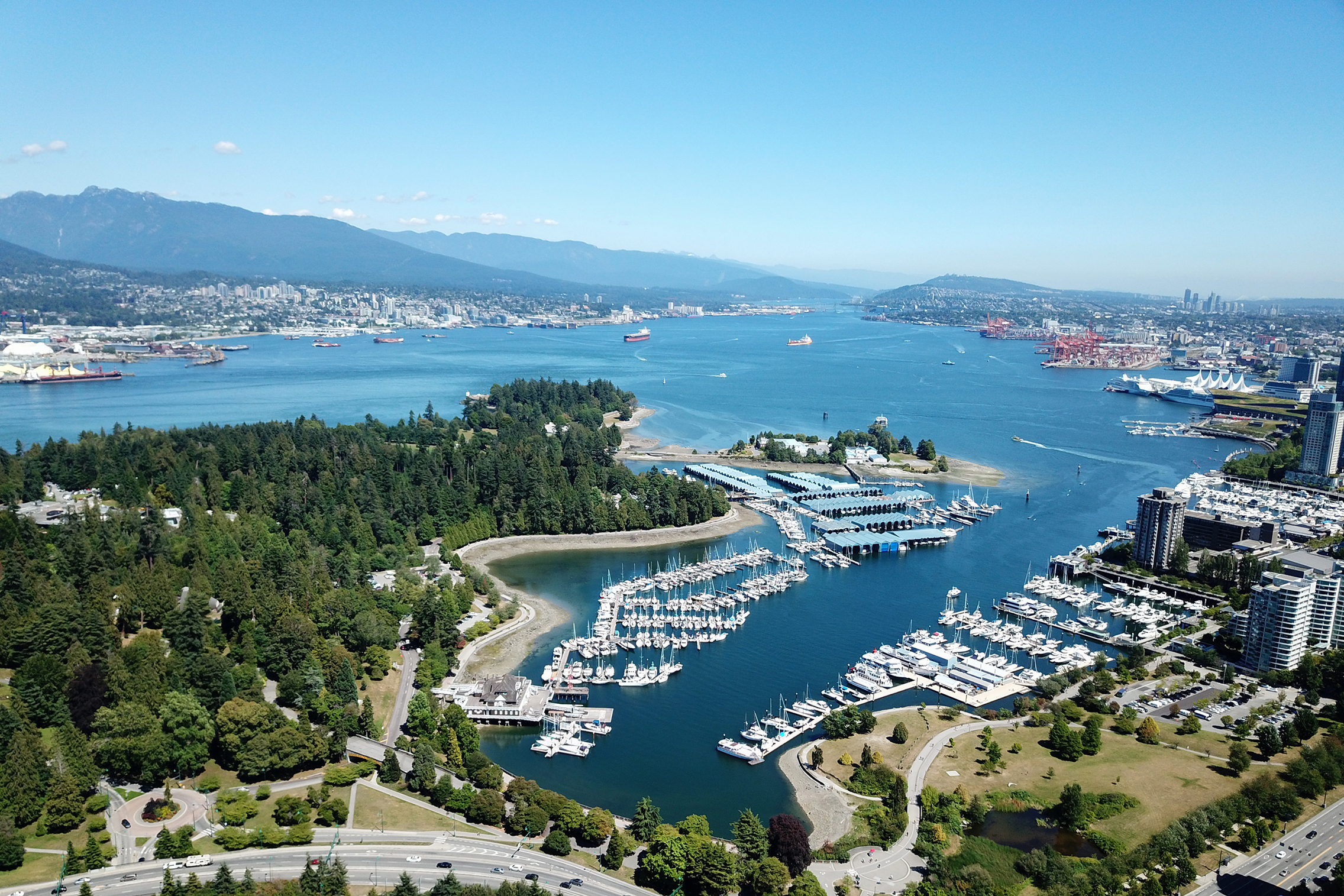
- Aerial view of Burrard Inlet

- Location in British Columbia

- Map of Burrard Inlet
- Location: Greater Vancouver, British Columbia, Canada
- Coordinates: 49°17′55″N 123°05′07″W
- Type: Fjord
- Part of: Salish Sea
- Max. length: 44 km (27 mi)
- Sections/sub-basins: English Bay, False Creek, Indian Arm

Burrard Inlet (Halkomelem: səl̓ilw̓ət) is a shallow-sided fjord in the northwestern Lower Mainland, British Columbia, Canada. Formed during the last Ice Age, it separates the City of Vancouver and the rest of the lowland Burrard Peninsula to the south from the coastal slopes of the North Shore Mountains, which span West Vancouver and the City and District of North Vancouver to the north.

Burrard Inlet opens west into the Strait of Georgia between Point Atkinson and Point Grey. Vancouver's Downtown Peninsula protrudes northwesterly into the inlet, separating it into the wide outer Burrard Inlet to the west and the elongated inner Burrard Inlet to the east. The southeastern portion of the outer inlet is an open bay known as English Bay, which has a narrow eastern inlet called False Creek. The 400-metre-wide (1,300 ft) strait between Prospect Point and the sandbanks just east of the Capilano River mouth, which connects the inlet's outer and inner sections, is known as the First Narrows, traversed by the Lions Gate Bridge. The inner inlet then widens into Vancouver Harbour, which hosts the Port of Vancouver, Canada's largest port.

At the eastern end of the harbour, Burrard Inlet narrows again into a 350-metre-wide (1,150 ft) strait between Burnaby Heights and the mouth of the Seymour River, known as the Second Narrows, which is traversed by the Ironworkers Memorial Bridge and the Second Narrows Rail Bridge. After the Second Narrows, it widens again and continues east until the headland near Dollarton, where it splits into two arms. The longer arm, known as Indian Arm, extends northerly between Mount Seymour and Eagle Mountain until it meets the deltas of Indian River mouth. The shorter arm, known as Port Moody Arm or Moody Inlet, courses further east for another 6 kilometres (3.7 mi) past a 320-metre-wide (1,050 ft) strait (traversed only by overhead powerlines) between Burnaby Mountain and the bluffs of Belcarra Regional Park. Port Moody Arm is almost completely encompassed by the City of Port Moody.

== History ==
What is now known as Burrard Inlet has been home to the Indigenous peoples of the Musqueam, Squamish and Tsleil-waututh Bands, who have resided in this territory for thousands of years. In 1791, the first European explorers in the region, Juan Carrasco and José María Narváez, sailing under orders of Francisco de Eliza, entered the western part of the inlet in their ship, Santa Saturnina. They failed to find the Fraser River, mistaking the lowland of the river's delta as a major inlet of the sea, which they named Canal de Floridablanca. This led to one of the prime objectives of the 1792 expedition of Dionisio Alcalá Galiano, which was to determine the exact nature of the Canal de Floridablanca. Galiano spent many days exploring the general area, realizing that there was a great river there and sighting Burrard Inlet itself on June 19, 1792. Just days later, the inlet was again named by Captain George Vancouver, after his friend and former shipmate Captain Harry Burrard Neale.

In 1888, the inlet was described in The British Columbia Pilot published by the British Admiralty as follows.

Burrard inlet differs from most of the great sounds of this coast in being comparatively easy of access to steam vessels of any size or class, and in the convenient depth of water for anchorage which may be found in almost every part of it; its close proximity to Fraser river, with the great facilities for constructing roads between the two places, and its having become the terminus of the Pacific and Canadian Railway, likewise add considerably to its importance. It is divided into three distinct harbours, viz., English bay or the outer anchorage; Vancouver (formerly called Coal harbour), above the First Narrows; and Port Moody at the head of the eastern arm of the inlet.

== Geography ==
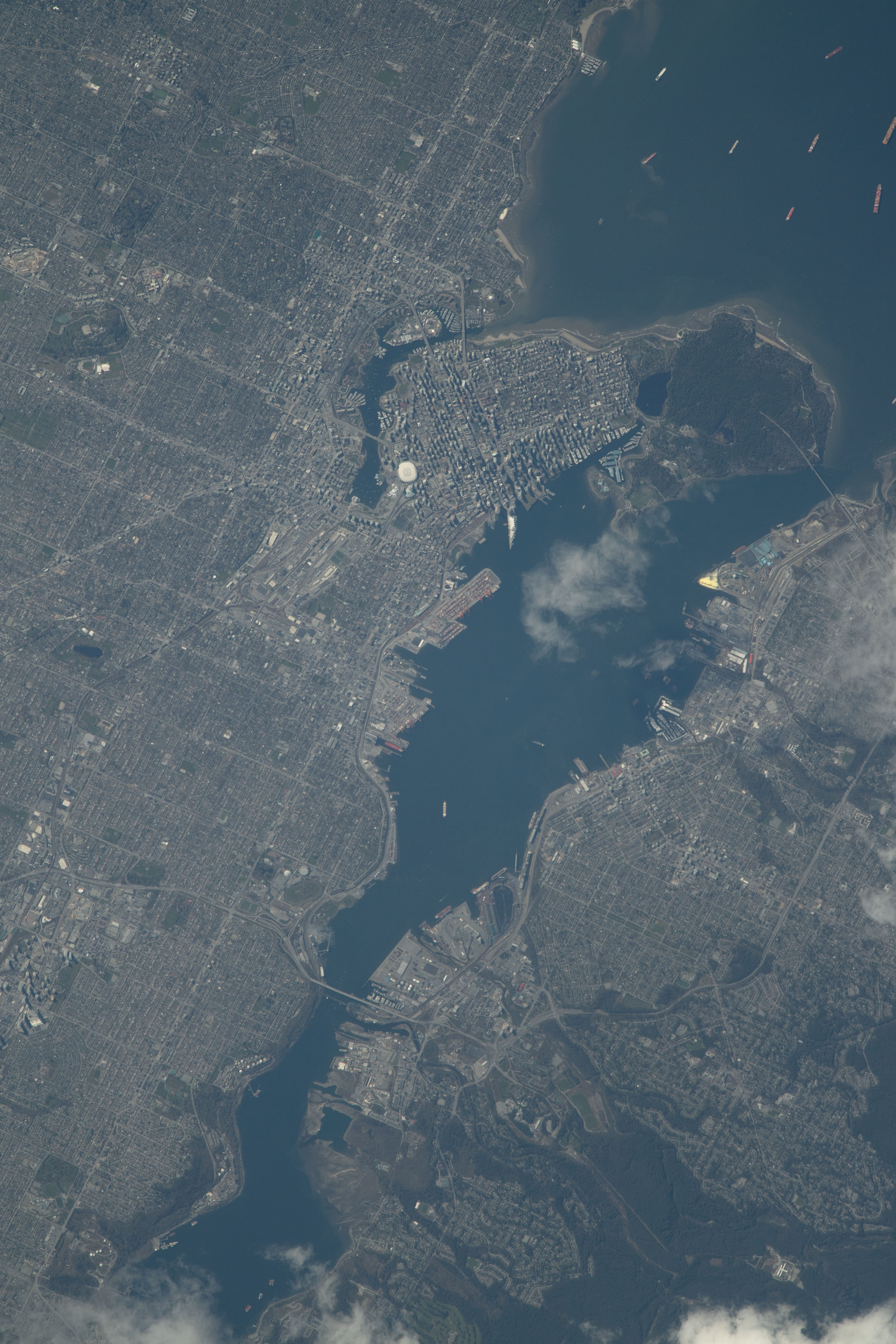
Part of the Outer Harbour (upper area), extending to part of the Central Harbour (lower area) on April 5, 2022. Taken from the International Space Station during Expedition 67; north is oriented towards the right and somewhat down.

The inlet runs almost directly east from the Strait of Georgia to Port Moody. About two-thirds of the way east from the mouth of the inlet, the steep-sided Indian Arm branches off to the north between Belcarra and Deep Cove on into the Pacific Ranges.

Near the mouth of the inlet, a small section of the inlet along the curved stretch of the Burrard Peninsula is named English Bay. From English Bay, a small inlet named False Creek branches off to the east and incises the peninsula.

=== Extent ===
The extent of Burrard Inlet is defined as a line between Point Atkinson and Point Grey on the west, the end of Port Moody Arm on the east, and the head of Indian Arm on the north. The inlet is about 31 kilometres (19 mi) long from the Strait of Georgia to Port Moody, or about 44 kilometres (27 mi) from the Strait of Georgia to the head of Indian Arm.

== Settlements ==
Settlements on the shores of Burrard Inlet include Vancouver, West Vancouver, North Vancouver, Burnaby, and Port Moody. Three bridges, the First Narrows Bridge (alias Lions Gate Bridge) (built in the 1930s), the Ironworkers Memorial Second Narrows Crossing (1960) and the CNR railway bridge (1969) at the Second Narrows, and the SeaBus passenger ferry, cross the inlet. Aside from just east of the inlet's mouth (where it includes English Bay), it is widest (about 3 km or 1.9 mi) between the First and Second Narrows, also the busiest part of Vancouver's port.

== Port of Vancouver ==
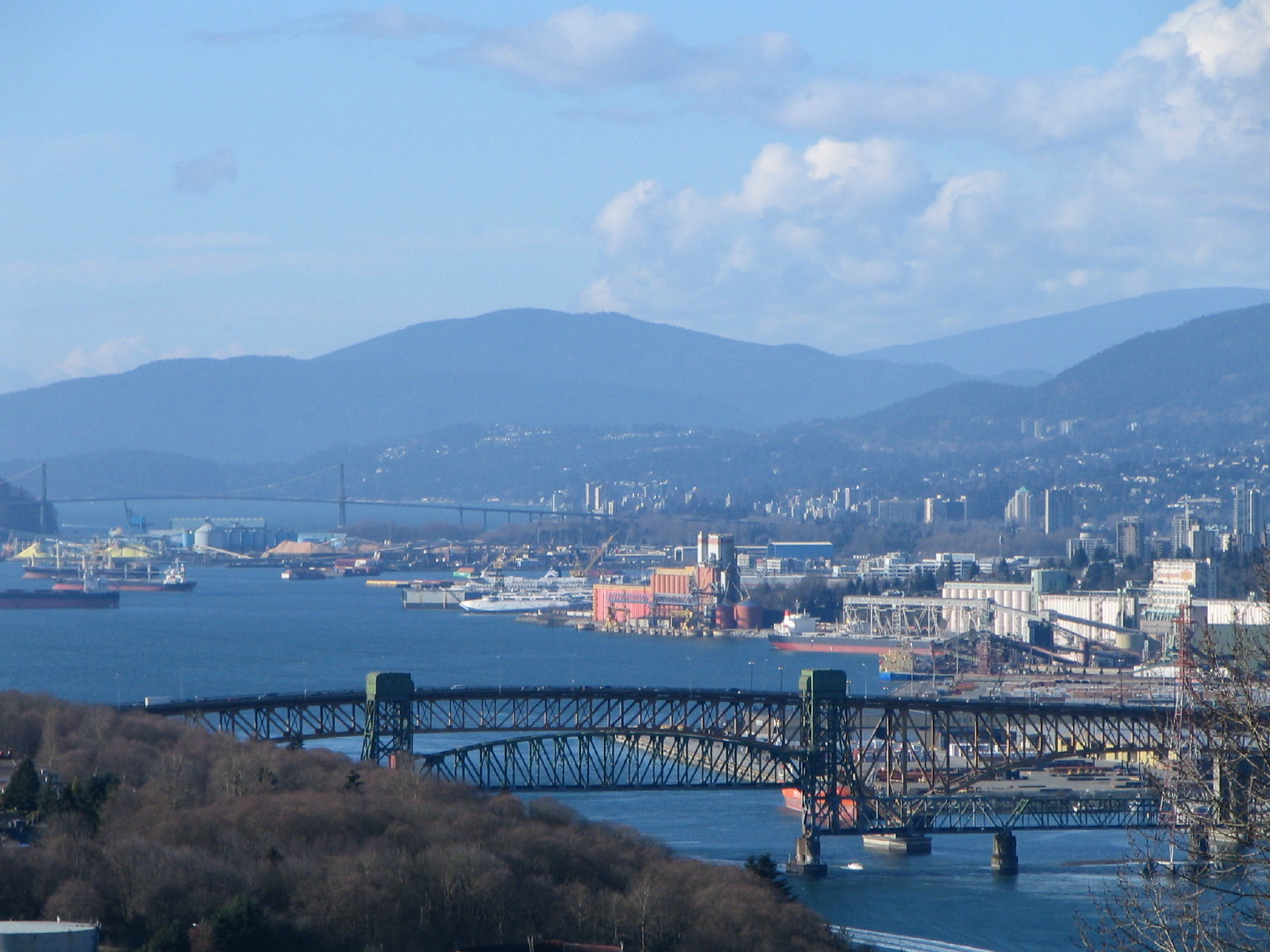
Burrard Inlet and the Second Narrows Ironworkers Memorial Bridge, looking west from Capitol Hill in Burnaby

Protected from the open ocean, the calm waters of Burrard Inlet form Vancouver's primary port area, an excellent one for large ocean-going ships. While some of the shoreline is residential and commercial, much is port-industrial, including railyards, terminals for container and bulk cargo ships, grain elevators, and (towards the eastern end) oil refineries. Freighters waiting to load or discharge cargoes in the inlet often anchor in English Bay, which lies south of the mouth of the inlet and is separated from it by Vancouver's downtown peninsula and Stanley Park.

On the main inlet, a few park areas remain forested as they were centuries ago, but the steep slopes of Indian Arm are so impassable that most have seen no development, despite the proximity of such a major city. Only in 2003 was a rough wilderness hiking trail around the whole of Indian Arm completed, and it was the work of one man over many years.

== Major crossings ==
The major crossings of Burrard Inlet, from west to east, are as follows:

- Lions Gate Bridge
- SeaBus
- Ironworkers Memorial Second Narrows Crossing, or
  - Second Narrows Bridge
