= Anmore =

- Village
- Village of Anmore
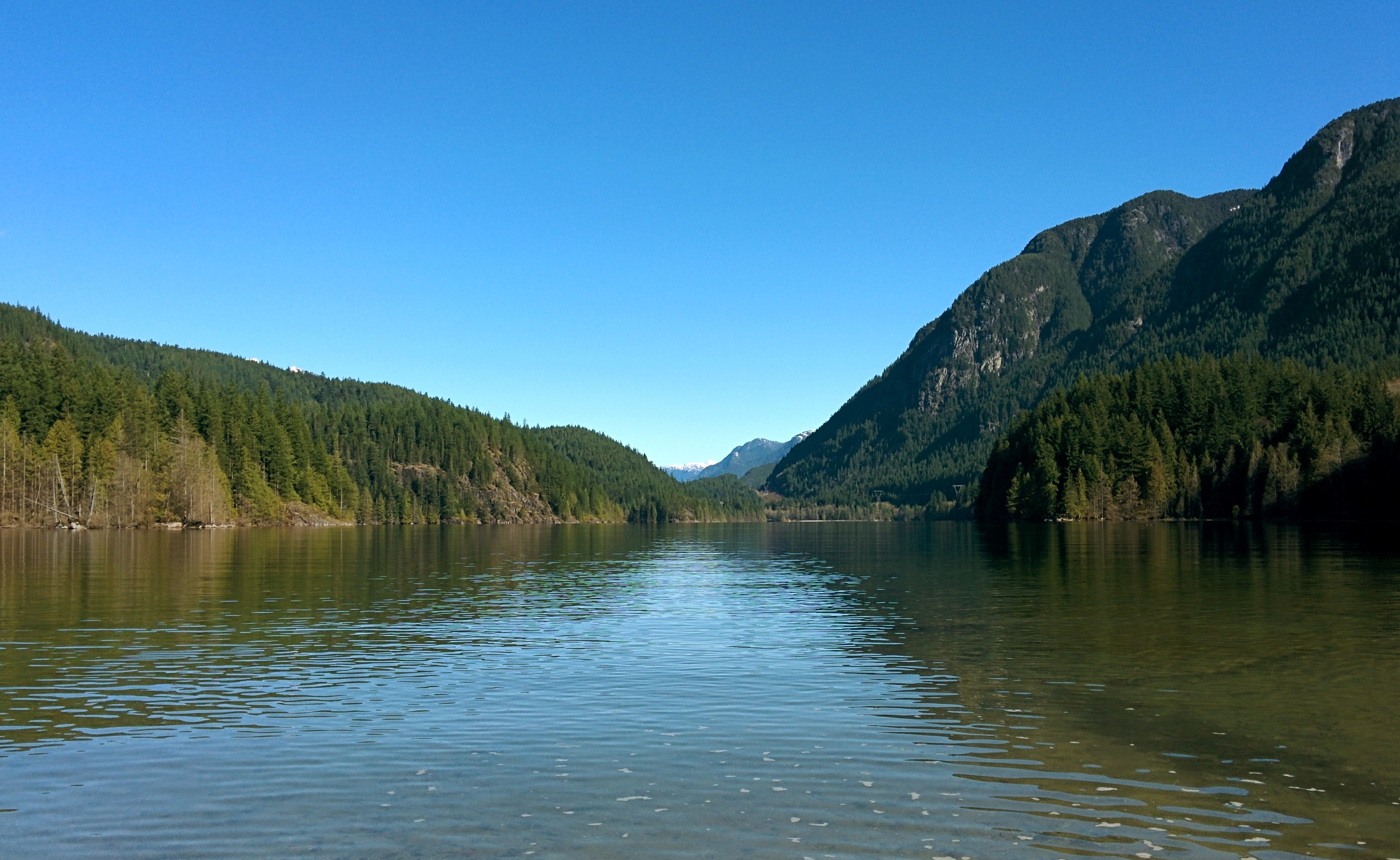
- Buntzen Lake

- Location of Anmore in Metro Vancouver
- Coordinates: 49°18′52″N 122°51′23″W
- Country: Canada
- Province: British Columbia
- Regional district: Metro Vancouver
- Incorporated: December 7, 1987
- Seat: Anmore Village Hall

Government
  - Type: Mayor-council government
  - Body: Anmore Village Council
  - Mayor: Doug Richardson
  - Village Council: Councillors: Carl Schmidt; Harriette Chang; Rod Rempel; Will Crocker
  - MP: Zoe Royer (Liberal)
  - MLA: John McEwen ( Conservative)

Area
  - Land: 27.53 km^{2} (10.63 sq mi)
- Elevation: 180 m (590 ft)

Population (2021)
  - Total: 2,356
  - Estimate (2023): 2,533
  - Density: 85.6/km^{2} (222/sq mi)
- Time zone: UTC−07:00 (BC Pacific Time)
- Forward sortation area: V3H
- Area codes: 604, 778, 236, 672
- Highways: None
- Waterways: Indian Arm
- Website: www.anmore.com

Anmore is a village in Metro Vancouver, British Columbia, Canada. It is north of the city of Port Moody and along the shores of the Indian Arm. Anmore is one of three politically independent village municipalities (municipalities with populations under 2,500) in the Greater Vancouver area, the others being its neighbour Belcarra, and Lions Bay.

== Etymology ==
Anmore got its name from a local homesteader, F. J. Lancaster, who combined the names of his wife (Annie) and his daughter (Leonore) to make "Annore." This evolved into the village's current name, "Anmore".

== Demographics ==
In the 2021 Census of Population conducted by Statistics Canada, Anmore had a population of 2,356 living in 744 of its 768 total private dwellings, a change of 6.6% from its 2016 population of 2,210. With a land area of 27.53 km^{2} (10.63 sq mi), it had a population density of 85.6/km^{2} (221.6/sq mi) in 2021.

=== Ethnicity ===
2016 Canadian census data
Groups		Population	% of total population
Visible minority groups	South Asian	15	0.7%
Visible minority groups	Chinese	250	11.3%
Visible minority groups	West Asian	55	2.5%
Visible minority groups	Black	20	0.9%
Visible minority groups	Filipino	20	0.9%
Visible minority groups	Latin American	15	0.7%
Visible minority groups	Southeast Asian	10	0.5%
Visible minority groups	Korean	20	0.9%
Visible minority groups	Japanese	30	1.4%
Visible minority groups	Total visible minority population	490	22.2%
Aboriginal groups	First Nations	55	2.5%
Aboriginal groups	Métis	25	1.1%
Aboriginal groups	Total Aboriginal population	55	2.5%
European Canadian		1,725	78.1%
Total population		2,210	100%

=== Religion ===
According to the 2021 census, religious groups in Anmore included the following:

- Irreligion (1,305 persons or 54.5%)
- Christianity (915 persons or 38.2%)
- Islam (60 persons or 2.5%)
- Buddhism (15 persons or 0.6%)
- Other (40 persons or 1.7%)

== Geography ==
Anmore is home to the Buntzen Lake recreation area, which is a popular tourist destination for its two beaches located on each end, as well as its network of hiking and biking trails that surround the lake. Managed by BC Hydro, the lake is used to power two hydroelectric stations located on Indian Arm.

A 1978 plan for the village to have 15,000 residents by 1988 was vocally opposed by its residents, and they have instead insisted on preserving what they call their "semi-rural" goal. Consistent with this earlier citizen opposition to development, in a referendum concomitant with the municipal election of 2002, 70% of the citizens of Anmore voted in favour of maintaining the existing RS-1 zoning (1-acre lot size), 70% in favour of the 1-acre (4,000 m^{2}) zoning with further enhancements, another 77% voted against half acre zoning, and 67% against a half acre every five years.

== Transportation ==
There are two main streets in Anmore, both of which terminate at Port Moody. Sunnyside Road runs primarily north–south from the near sea-level western entrance of the village to the entrance of Buntzen Lake at the northern end of the village. East Road enters Anmore from Heritage Mountain and runs primarily north–south until about the 4-kilometre (2.5 mi) mark, where it turns and runs east–west until its termination at Sunnyside Road. There are several proposed plans to build another street between Port Moody and Anmore.

As part of Metro Vancouver, Anmore is connected to the TransLink public transit system and is served by the 182 Community Shuttle bus that runs down both major streets, Sunnyside Road and East Road. Supplemental summertime service to Buntzen Lake is provided by the 179 service from Coquitlam Central Station.

== Notable people ==
Anmore was a long-time home for Canadian icon Margaret Lally "Ma" Murray, an American-Canadian newspaper editor, publisher, and columnist, an officer of the Order of Canada, and the wife of publisher and British Columbia MLA George Matheson Murray. George and "Ma" Murray's former home at the corner of Sunnyside and East Road was donated to the Village in 1988 by the owners at the time and acted as Anmore's village hall until early 2018 when the 100-year-old homestead was demolished.

Hal Weinberg was the 1st Mayor of Anmore and the person responsible for incorporating the Village. Along with Bob Hunter, the 1st president of Greenpeace and Anmore resident, they incorporated Anmore from Rural Area B and based the Village on their rural development concept, they aptly named, "the Anmore Concept". Hal was also responsible, along with his councilors in getting the village water system going, adding BC Transit access, Paving the pedestrian walkway that still exists alongside Sunnyside Road and working with BC Hydro to turn Buntzen Lake into a park. Hal was mayor from 1987 – 2009.

Ryan Johansen, a professional ice hockey centre for the Colorado Avalanche of the National Hockey League (NHL), resides in Anmore.

Notable broadcaster and actress Kelsa Kinsly grew up in Anmore. At that time, her name was Linda MacDonald. She went on to work for The Howard Stern Show, The Weather Channel, CTV, NBC, Q107, CFOX, and FOX TV, as well as a surprising amount of roles as an actress in film and TV series in both the US and Canada.
