= Tsleil-Waututh First Nation =

First Nation band in British Columbia, Canada

Tsleil-Waututh Nation
- Band No. 549
- səlilwətaɬ
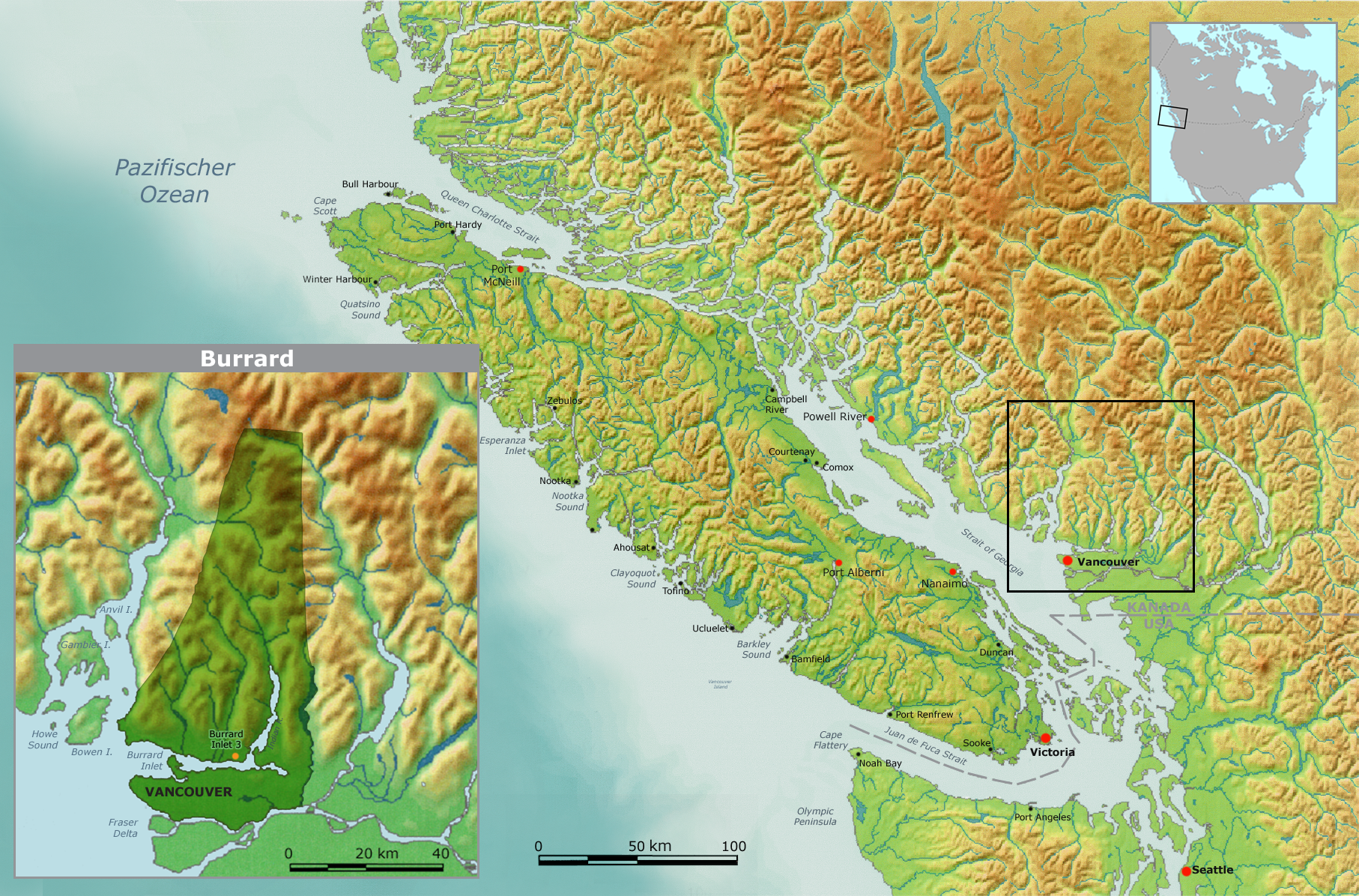
- People: Coast Salish
- Headquarters: North Vancouver
- Province: British Columbia

Land
- Main reserve: Burrard Inlet 3
- Reserves: Inlailwatash 4; Inlailwatash 4A
- Land area: 1.1 km^{2} (0.42 sq mi)

Population (2024)
- On reserve: 292
- On other land: 51
- Off reserve: 363
- Total population: 706

Government
- Chief: Justin George
- Council: List of Counselors: Charlene Aleck; Deanne George; Liana Martin; Kevin O’Neill; Curtis Thomas; Dennis Thomas

Tribal Council
- Naut'sa mawt Tribal Council

Website
- twnation.ca

Tsleil-Waututh Nation (Halkomelem: səlilwətaɬ, [səlilwətaɬ]), formerly known as the Burrard Indian Band or Burrard Inlet Indian Band, is a First Nations band government in the Canadian province of British Columbia. Tsleil-Waututh Nation ("TWN") are Coast Salish peoples who speak hən̓q̓əmin̓əm̓, the Downriver dialect of the Halkomelem language, and are closely related to but politically and culturally separate from the nearby nations of the Sḵwx̱wú7mesh (Squamish) and xʷməθkʷəy̓əm (Musqueam), with whose traditional territories some claims overlap.

TWN is a member government of the Naut'sa mawt Tribal Council, which includes other governments on the upper Sunshine Coast, southeastern Vancouver Island and the Tsawwassen band on the other side of the Vancouver metropolis from the Tsleil-Waututh. There are almost 600 members with 287 living on the reserve as of January 2018.

According to the 2011 National Community Well-Being Index, Burrard Inlet 3 is considered the second (after Bigstone Cree Nation - Desmarais) most prosperous First Nation community in Canada.

== Notable members ==
The most famous member of TWN was Chief Dan George, an actor and native rights advocate best known for his role as Old Lodge Skins in Little Big Man, The Outlaw Josey Wales and for another role as Old Antoine in the Canadian Broadcasting Corporation television series Cariboo Country (based on books by Paul St. Pierre). His descendants still figure prominently in TWN government and culture. The TWN is also known for its war canoe racing team, The Burrard Canoe Club.

Hereditary Chief John L. George was the longest serving elected Chief and founding member of the Union of BC Indian Chiefs, formed in 1969 against the Liberal 'White Paper' Policy that would end Indian status. He was a strong advocate and protector of TWN Aboriginal Rights and Title. Leonard H. George was elected Chief and created the TWN Takaya Developments and began the partnerships that have brought much real estate development to TWN. Leonard also brought TWN into the BC Treaty Process and was a strong voice for the TWN. As well, he is the son of Dan George and was a successful actor as well as a politician.

TWN operates an ocean-going canoe tour/experience known as Takaya Tours.

== Reserves ==
Indian Reserves under the administration of Tsleil-Waututh Nation are:

- Burrard Inlet 3 (Halkomelem: səlil̓ilw̓ətaʔɬ), on the north shore of Burrard Inlet, in District of North Vancouver, Main Reserve of the Nation, 108.2 hectares (267 acres). 49.3104485°N 122.98111911°W
- Inlailwatash 4, about 1 km (1000 yards) upstream from the mouth of Indian River, 19 km (12 mi) North-Northeast of Burrand Inlet 3 Reserve, 0.5 ha (1 1/4 acres). 49.47396602°N 122.8828676498°W
- Inlailwatash 4A, about 1.3 km (1500 yards) upstream from mouth of Indian River, 19 km (12 mi) North-Northeast of Burrand Inlet 3 Reserve, 2 hectares (4.9 acres). 49.4761317736°N 122.885185811°W

== Documentary and Notable Events ==
In 2006, a documentary followed and was filmed by four Tsleil-Waututh youth to highlight their struggles with the education system. The documentary — titled Reds, Whites & the Blues and/or, Reading, Writing & the Rez — is a CBC Newsworld in-house production co-produced with CBUT.

In 2010 TWN helped welcome the Vancouver 2010 Winter Olympics as part of the Four Host First Nations, which included Musqueam, Squamish, and Lil'wat Nations. It was the first time that Canada accommodated the Indigenous nations interest in the event. It was the first time Indigenous title holders were recognized by the Olympic body.

TWN is also opposed to the Trans Mountain Expansion Project and their views and scientific reports can be found at the Sacred Trust Initiative website.:

== See also ==
- Squamish Nation
- Coast Salish peoples
- Dan George
- History of Squamish and Tsleil-Waututh Longshoremen, 1863-1963
