= Coquitlam (disambiguation) =

Coquitlam is a city in British Columbia, Canada.

Coquitlam may also refer to:

== Places ==
- Coquitlam 1, properly known as Coquitlam Indian Reserve No. 1, and Indian reserve on the Coquitlam River
- Coquitlam 2, an Indian reserve in British Columbia, Canada
- Coquitlam (electoral district), a former provincial electoral district in British Columbia, Canada
- Coquitlam-Moody, a former provincial electoral district in British Columbia, Canada
- Coquitlam-Maillardville, a provincial electoral district in British Columbia, Canada
- Port Coquitlam, a city in British Columbia, Canada

== Natural formations ==
- Coquitlam Mountain, a mountain east of Coquitlam Lake in British Columbia, Canada
- Coquitlam Range, a range of mountains including Coquitlam Mountain
- Coquitlam River, a river in British Columbia, Canada
  - Coquitlam Dam, a dam on the river
    - Coquitlam Lake, a reservoir formed by the dam

== Other uses ==
- Kwikwetlem First Nation, a.k.a. Coquitlam Indian Band
- Coquitlam Town Centre, a shopping mall and surrounding area in the city of Coquitlam, British Columbia
