= Little Finger (mountain) =

Mountain in Canada

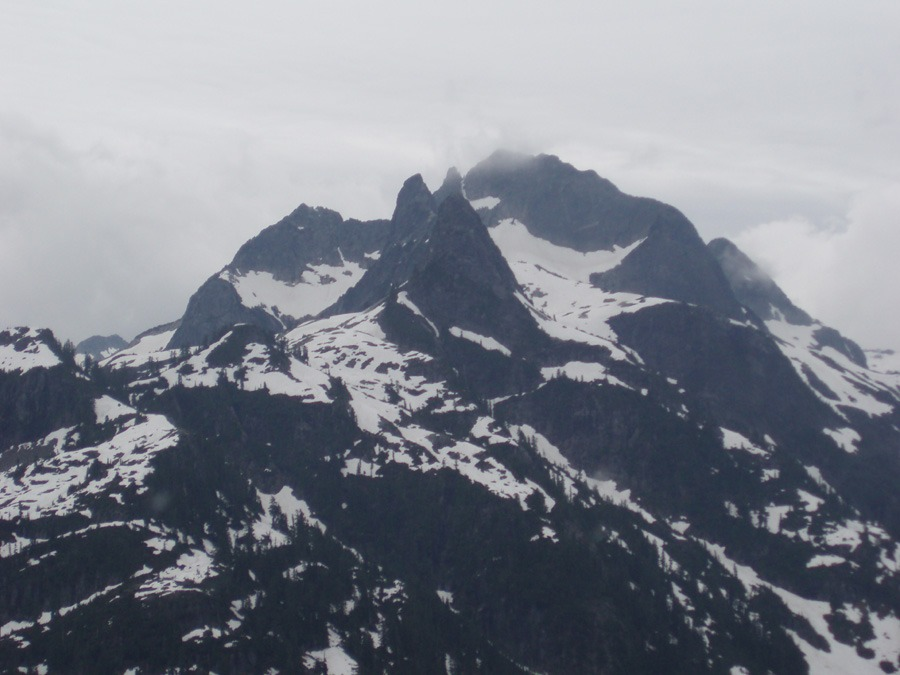
- The little finger is the tower in the foreground of this photo, with the Middle Finger behind

Highest point
- Elevation: 1,732 m (5,682 ft)
- Prominence: 162 m (531 ft)
- Coordinates: 49°31′25″N 122°42′4″W

Geography
- Location within British Columbia
- Interactive map of the Little Finger
- Location: British Columbia, Canada
- District: New Westminster Land District
- Parent range: Five Fingers Group, Pacific Ranges, Coast Mountains
- Topo map: NTS 92G10 Pitt River

Climbing
- First ascent: 1952 J. Chamberlain; J. Roddick
- Easiest route: south side

The Little Finger is a mountain in the Five Fingers Group, a group of summits on the divide between Pitt Lake and Coquitlam Lake and north of Widgeon Lake, in British Columbia, Canada.
