= The Forefinger (mountain) =

Mountain in British Columbia, Canada

- Location within British Columbia
- Interactive map of The Forefinger

Highest point
- Elevation: 1,741 m (5,712 ft)
- Prominence: 76 m (249 ft)
- Coordinates: 49°30′15.8″N 122°43′27.9″W

Geography
- Location: British Columbia, Canada
- District: New Westminster Land District
- Parent range: Five Fingers Group, Pacific Ranges, Coast Mountains
- Topo map: NTS 92G10 Pitt River

Climbing
- First ascent: 1924 T. Fyles
- Easiest route: scramble from the south

The Forefinger is a mountain in the Five Fingers Group, a group of summits on the divide between Pitt Lake and Coquitlam Lake and north of Widgeon Lake, in British Columbia, Canada.
