= Peneplain Peak (British Columbia) =

Summit in British Columbia, Canada

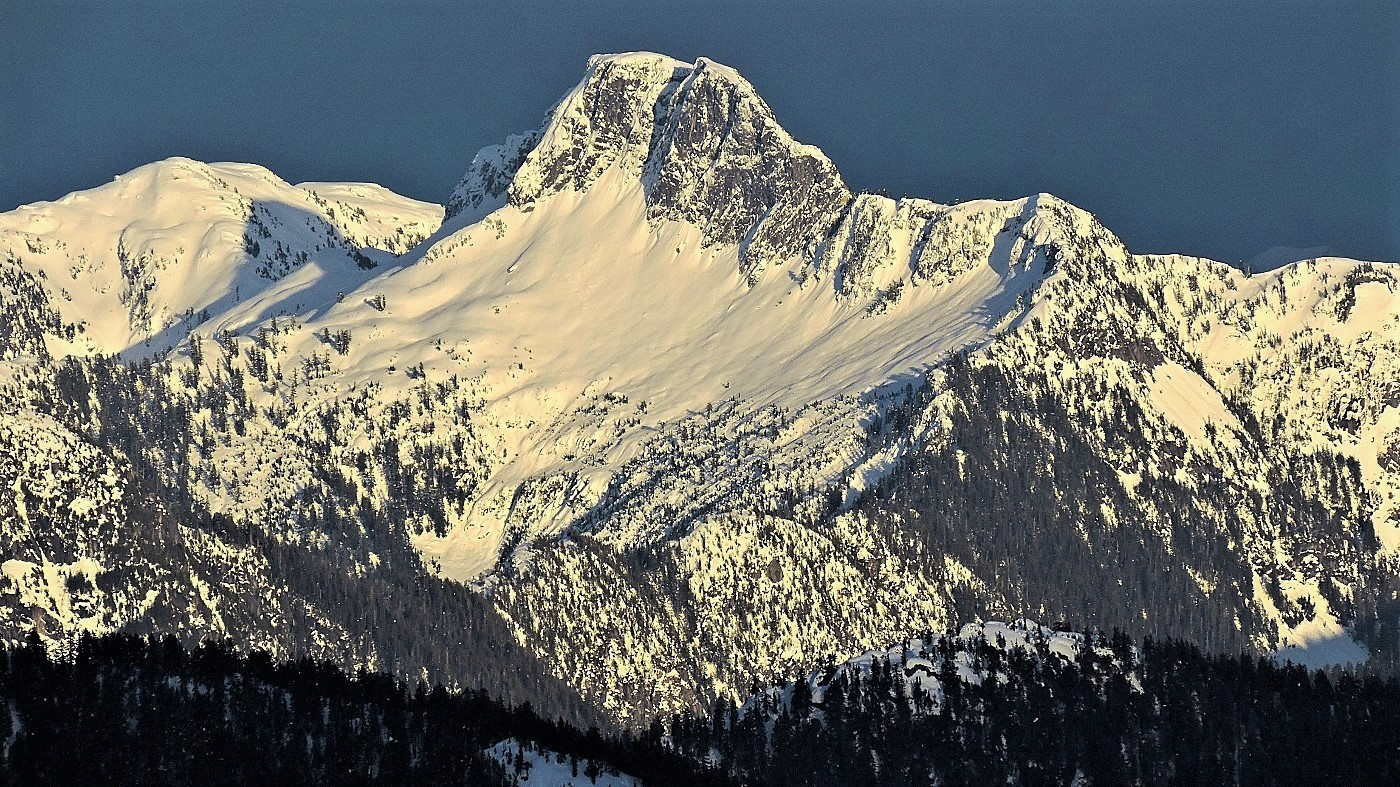
- West aspect

Highest point
- Elevation: 1,707 m (5,600 ft)
- Prominence: 207 m (679 ft)
- Parent peak: Middle Finger (1,890 m)
- Isolation: 2.4 km (1.5 mi)
- Listing: Mountains of British Columbia
- Coordinates: 49°27′46″N 122°41′53″W

Naming
- Etymology: Peneplain

Geography
- Location within British Columbia Location within Canada
- Interactive map of Peneplain Peak
- Country: Canada
- Province: British Columbia
- District: New Westminster Land District
- Protected area: Pinecone Burke Provincial Park
- Parent range: Coquitlam Ranges; Coast Mountains
- Topo map: NTS 92G7 Port Coquitlam

Peneplain Peak is a 1,707-metre (5,600-foot) summit located in British Columbia, Canada.

== Description ==
Peneplain Peak is situated 35 km (22 mi) northeast of Vancouver in the Coquitlam Ranges of the Coast Mountains. It is the fifth-highest point in the Coquitlam Ranges. Precipitation runoff from the mountain's east slope drains into Widgeon Creek, thence Pitt River; and from the west slope into the Coquitlam River watershed. Peneplain Peak is more notable for its steep rise above local terrain than for its absolute elevation as topographic relief is significant with the summit rising 930 meters (3,050 ft) above Widgeon Lake in 1.5 km (0.93 mi), and 1,550 meters (5,085 ft) above Coquitlam Lake in 5 km (3.1 mi). The mountain's toponym, well-established in the mountaineering community, was officially adopted May 3, 1951, by the Geographical Names Board of Canada. It is pronounced "PENNa plane."

== Climate ==
Based on the Köppen climate classification, Peneplain Peak is located in the marine west coast climate zone of western North America. Most weather fronts originate in the Pacific Ocean, and travel east toward the Coast Mountains where they are forced upward by the range (Orographic lift), causing them to drop their moisture in the form of rain or snowfall. As a result, the Coast Mountains experience high precipitation, especially during the winter months in the form of snowfall. Winter temperatures can drop below −20 °C with wind chill factors below −30 °C. The months July through September offer the most favorable weather for climbing Peneplain Peak.

== See also ==
- Geography of British Columbia
- Geology of British Columbia
