= The Thumb (mountain) =

Mountain in British Columbia, Canada

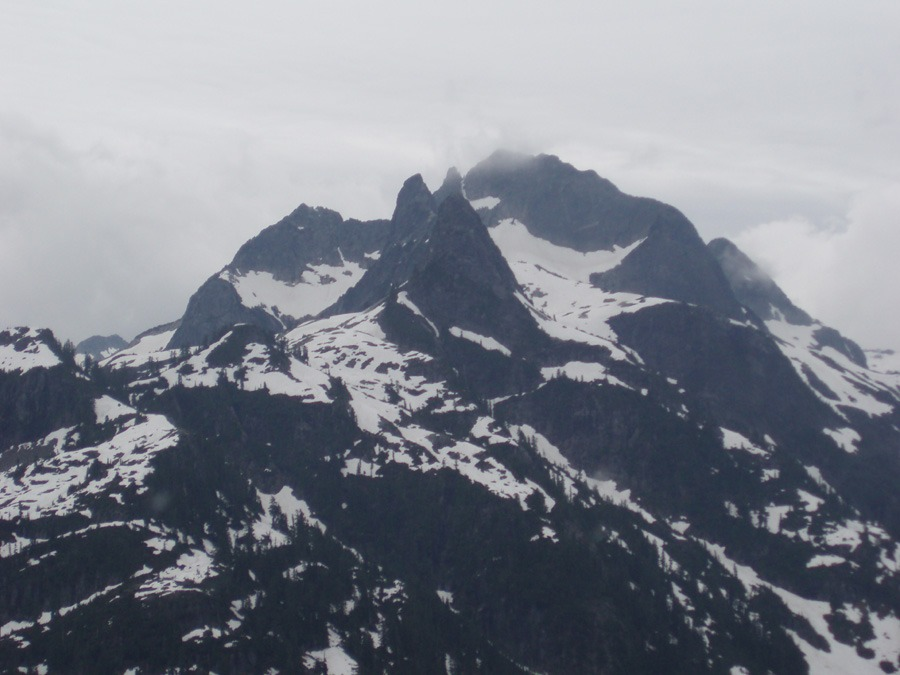
- The thumb is on the spur ridge on the left of this photo

Highest point
- Elevation: 1,815 m (5,955 ft)
- Prominence: 30 m (98 ft)
- Coordinates: 49°30′51.8″N 122°42′5″W

Geography
- Location within British Columbia
- Interactive map of The Thumb
- Location: British Columbia, Canada
- District: New Westminster Land District
- Parent range: Five Fingers Group, Pacific Ranges, Coast Mountains
- Topo map: NTS 92G10 Pitt River

Climbing
- First ascent: 1940 R. Fraser; W. Mathews
- Easiest route: scramble from southeast

The Thumb is a mountain in the Five Fingers Group, a group of summits on the divide between Pitt Lake and Coquitlam Lake and north of Widgeon Lake, in British Columbia, Canada.
