= Port Moody–Coquitlam Railway =

Defunct railway in Coquitlam, British Columbia

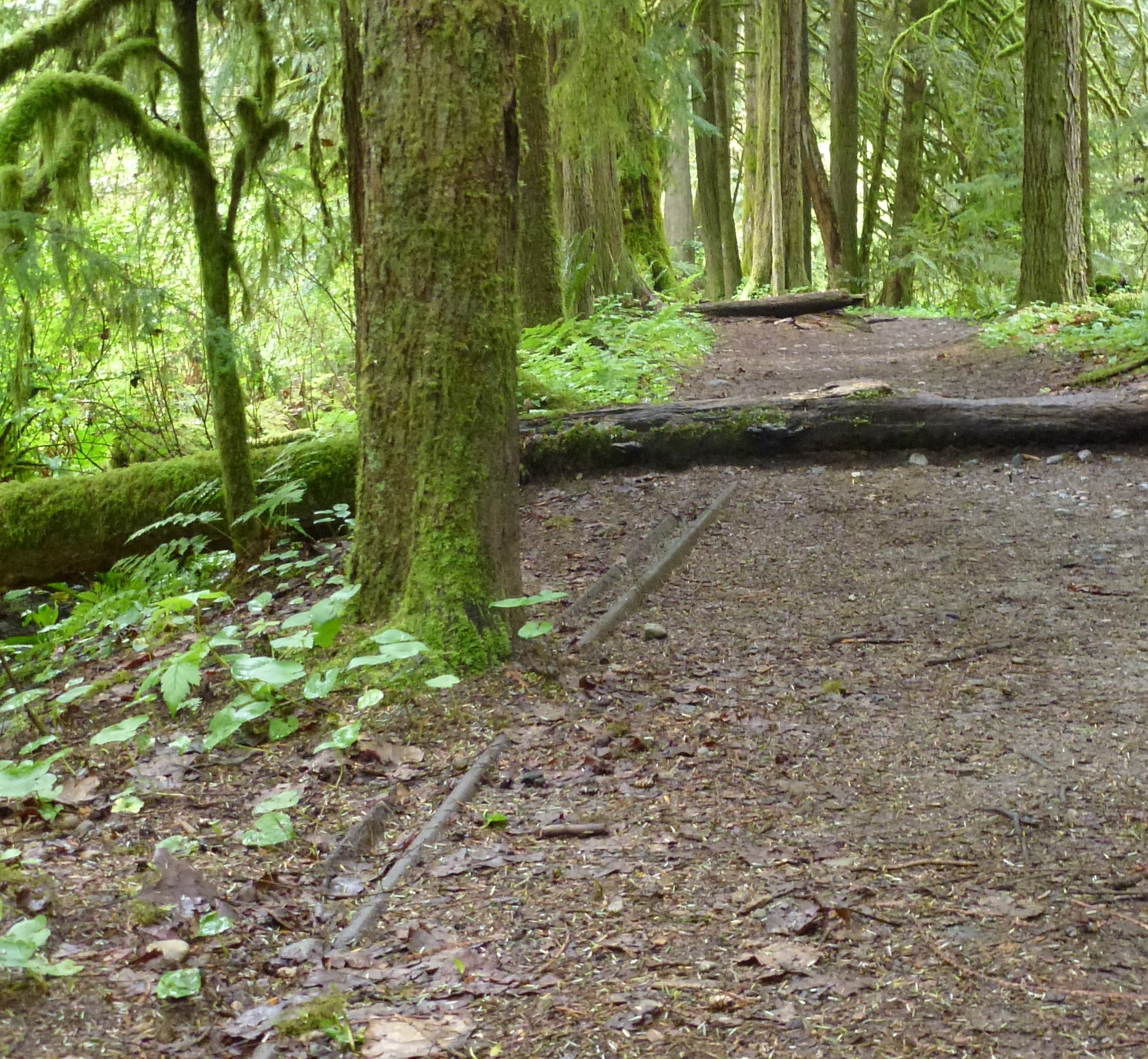
- Ruins of railway tracks on Coquitlam's Crystal Falls trail

Overview
- Parent company: British Columbia Electric Railway
- Headquarters: Port Moody, British Columbia
- Locale: Port Moody and Coquitlam
- Dates of operation: 1914–

Technical
- Track gauge: 1,435 mm (4 ft 8 1/2 in) standard gauge
- Length: 12 km (7.5 mi)

The Port Moody–Coquitlam Railway, also known as the Thurston–Flavelle Railway, was a short railway line operated by the British Columbia Electric Railway. The line ran from the east end of Burrard Inlet to Coquitlam Lake, British Columbia, Canada.

== History ==
The railway connected the Port Moody-Ioco spur of the Canadian Pacific Railway to the Coquitlam Dam and was built during the early 1910s in-order to haul supplies and materials to the dam. It was built by B.C. Electric in partnership with Robert McNair of the Robert McNair Shingle Company, who signed a twenty-five year deal with B.C. Electric on 1 October 1912. The railway was first estimated to cost $75,000 (Note: Year not stated) (although this would balloon to $206,000). The railway was using 40-pound (18 kg) rails built on a 66-foot (20-metre) right-of-way. McNair would be allowed to use the line, but would have to pay $50,000 towards construction costs and thereafter the same amount every year. The line saw its first seven miles complete on 7 March 1914. A speed limit of 10 mph (16 km/h) was applied to the line. The B.C.E.R. also built a dock for McNair to ship logs from. McNair would ultimately use the line to bring timber from the lake down to his mill. In 1917 the line was re-laid with 56-pound (25 kg) rail.

By 1923, McNair had stopped paying his annual lease. The agreement folded that year, either due to McNair's passing, or an expiration of the agreement. Either way, B.C.E.R. decided to sell the company to the Thurston–Flavelle Lumber Company, a local sawmill, on 14 April 1923. From this point, events become unclear, with multiple sources claiming differing events. According to railway reports, Thurston-Flavelle leased, and then perhaps sold the line to Sig. Hage Timber. According to a City of Coquitlam report, the Robert Dollar company was allowed to use the railway.

Multiple spurs for hauling logs from Dollar Mountain (what is now Burke Mountain). Eventually, the railway was abandoned, with the rails confiscated.

=== Remnants ===
Much of the Coquitlam River portion of the line is now part of the Crystal Falls trail. A connecting trail which runs to Lancaster Court was a part of the Dollar Mountain Railway.

== Route ==
The western terminus of the railway was a pier next to the delta of Noons Creek at the end Burrard Inlet in Port Moody. It then continued along an alignment roughly parallel or on top of today's Avalon Drive. It continued close to what is now Ungless Way (albeit on a less steep grade than the present road) through the grounds of Eagle Ridge Hospital in Port Moody. It them followed Guildford Way in Coquitlam for about two kilometres before it met the Dewar/Deeks spur which ran along Pinetree Way from the Canadian Pacific Mainline at what is now southern end of Lafarge Lake. From there it turned northwards and ran somewhat parallel next to Pipeline Road until it crossed the Coquitlam River at what is now Galette Park. The railway continued north along what is now the Crystal Falls Trail until it crossed the Coquitlam River a few hundred metres south of B.C. Hydro's 500 kV right of way. It then continued closely along Pipeline Road until reaching its northern terminus.

=== Spurs ===
The railway connected with the Dewar/Deeks spur line at what is now Lafarge Lake. The spur served as an additional connection to the C.P.R. mainline. Its junction with the C.P.R. was at the end of Pheasant Street. It then followed Pinetree Way up until about the Henderson Place Mall where it turned in a north-north-east direction through to the intersection of Glen Drive and Westwood Street. It then continued northwards along West until it reached the Thurston-Flavelle. The line remained in operation perhaps until at least 1942 (likely serving the Lafarge Quarry which became Lafarge Lake).
