= Traboulay PoCo Trail =

Bicycle and hiking trail in Port Coquitlam, British Columbia, Canada

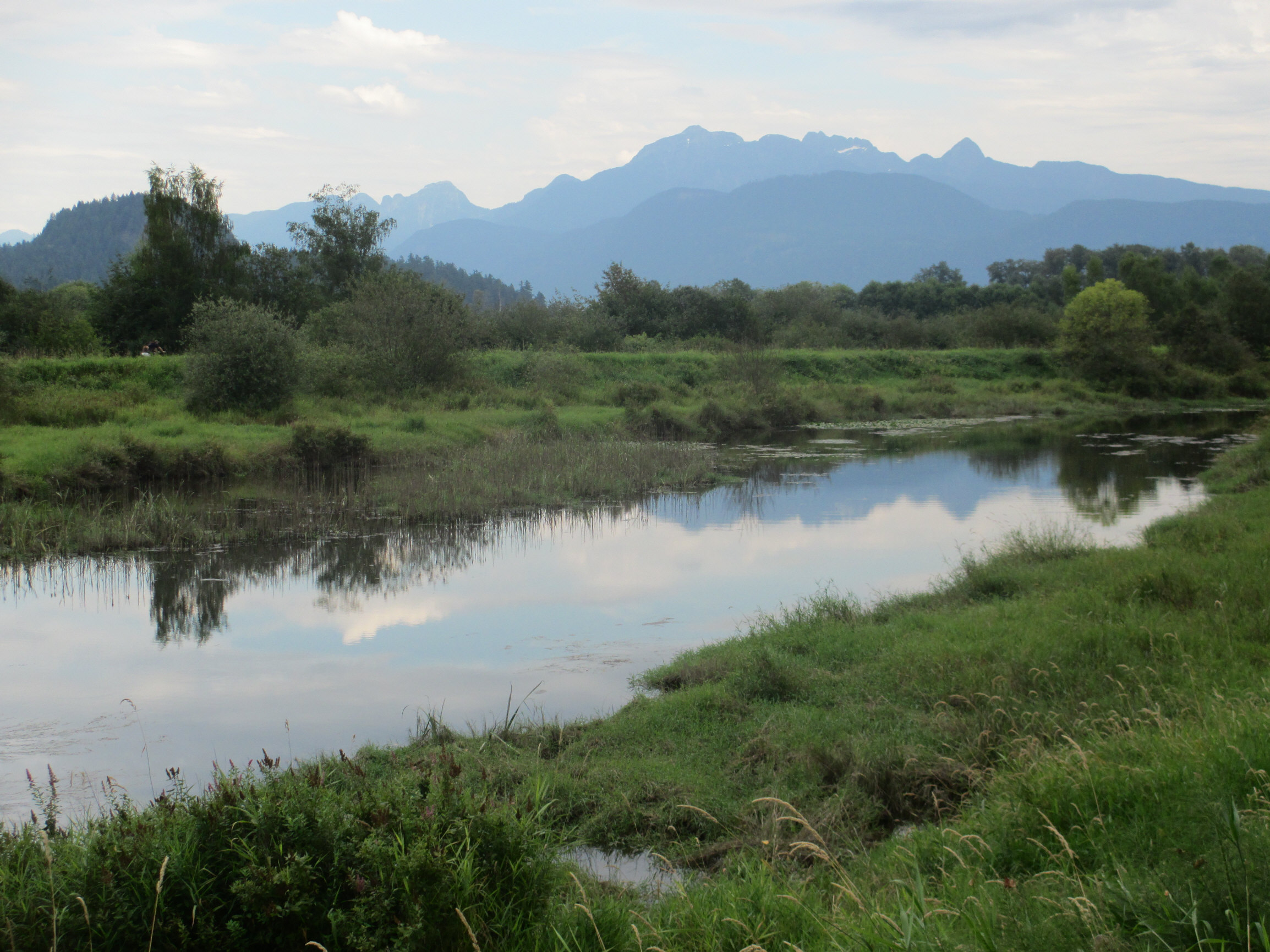
- View from the wetlands along the west side of Pitt River
- Length: 25.3 km (15.7 mi)
- Location: Port Coquitlam, British Columbia
- Established: 1970
- Difficulty: Easy

The Traboulay PoCo Trail is a 25.3 kilometer (15.7 mile) bicycle and hiking trail in Port Coquitlam, British Columbia. The trail encircles the community, with it passing through the Coquitlam River. It is next to the Fraser and Pitt River, running along a route that offers views of various ecosystems, farmlands and mountains.

== History ==
The trail was conceived as a project in 1967 for the city of Port Coquitlam, as a mean for celebrating Canada’s 100th birthday. Developments began in the early 70s by a group called the "PoCo Trail Blazers". In 1997, the city began to improve the trail in order to make it a central part of the community. Later developments were made in the years that followed, resulting in the 25.3 kilometer trail that now exists.

Between 2015 and 2019, the trail was included in the city budget for upgrades.

== Wildlife ==
The trail features many bird species along with creeks, forestation, meadows and marshes. Bears have been seen in the area during the salmon run.
