= Five Fingers =

Five Fingers or 5 Finger may refer to:

== Film and television ==
- 5 Fingers, a 1952 film directed by Joseph L. Mankiewicz.
- Five Fingers (2005 film), a Malayalam film by Sanjeev Raj starring Kunchacko Boban and Karthika
- Five Fingers (2006 film), a film written by Chad Thumann and Laurence Malkin and directed by Malkin
- Five Fingers (American TV series), a 1959 American adventure-drama television series set in Europe during the Cold War that aired on NBC
- Five Fingers (South Korean TV series), a 2012 South Korean TV series

== Geography ==
- Five Fingers, New Brunswick, a community in Restigouche County, New Brunswick
- Five Fingers Group, a mountain group near Vancouver, British Columbia
- 5 Fingers (Austria), an observation deck in the Austrian Alps
- Five Finger Mountain (disambiguation), several mountains by that name
- Five Finger Rapids on the river Yukon in Western Canada

== Other ==
- FiveFingers, a type of shoe manufactured by Vibram
- Starfruit, a fruit also known by the name 5 fingers
