= Middle finger (disambiguation) =

The middle finger is the third digit of the human hand.

Middle finger may refer to:

- The finger, an offensive gesture utilizing the third digit of the human hand
- Middle Finger (mountain), a mountain in Canada
- "Middle Finger" (song), by Cobra Starship, 2012
- "Middle Finger", a song by Limp Bizkit from their 2011 album Gold Cobra
- "Middle Finger", a song by Kevin Federline from his 2006 album Playing with Fire
- "Middle Finger", a 2018 song by Phoebe Ryan
- "Middle Fingers", a song by Missio from Loner, 2017
- "Middle Fingers", a song by The Reklaws from Good Ol' Days, 2022
- Galileo's middle finger, a relic
