= Pitt Lake's lost gold mine =

Pitt Lake, Lost Mine
- Lake
- Location within British Columbia
- Coordinates: 49°25′00″N 122°33′00″W
- Country: Canada
- Province: British Columbia
- Regional District: Lower Mainland

Pitt Lake's Lost Gold Mine is a legendary lost mine said to be near Pitt Lake, British Columbia, Canada, the supposed wealth of which has held the imagination of people worldwide for more than a century. Ever since the years of the Fraser Canyon Gold Rush, prospectors and adventurers have been looking for the mine, and gold-rush rumors have evolved into legends repeated and enriched over time. The mysterious riches are known as Slumach’s Lost Mine, or Lost Creek Mine.

== Origins ==
The story of Pitt Lake gold begins in 1858, the year of the Fraser Canyon Gold Rush, when several maps were published in San Francisco promoting the gold fields of British Columbia. Two of these maps show the words "gold" and "Indian diggings" in the country above Pitt Lake. Another map from that time shows the words "much gold-bearing quartz rock" on the north side of Pitt Lake, where, a decade later, in 1869, an Indian brought "... a good prospect of gold…which he states he found in a little stream on the north side of Pitt Lake" to New Westminster. The report created "great excitement" in the city, and parties set out to find the diggings.

In 1903, a newspaper in New Westminster BC reported that a man called George Moody, had claimed to have found a rich placer deposit at Pitt Lake, and had returned to town with $1,200 in coarse gold to prove it. That was all that was published about Moody's find.

In 1905, it was told that in 1902, "an Indian" had exchanged gold dust for $1,600 in bills in New Westminster. Several months later, he came back with $1,800 in gold dust, and again, with $1,400 in gold. He did not want to reveal where he got it, and attempts to follow him were unsuccessful. Then the Indian took sick, probably because of his exposure to inclement weather on expeditions in the mountains, and a doctor told him he was going to die. The Indian mentioned a relative, the secret source of his gold — a rich placer at Pitt Lake — and described its location, providing landmarks and tracing a crude map of the locality. After the unnamed Indian died, his relative, who had no money, sought the assistance of a white man. They were unable to locate the spot where the Indian claimed to have found the gold. With the secret now out, "there have been expeditions every year in an attempt to locate the mysterious placer."

In 1906, another such expedition again failed to find the gold. The participants had information that an old man had discovered some valuable placer ground in the Pitt Lake area and had hidden a substantial amount of gold nuggets under a rock. Before he died, he had left directions on where the treasure and the placer ground were to be found. It was "a rough trip as the weather was rainy, and sleeping out did not remind one of dreams between Dutch feather beds."

== Jackson alias Shotwell ==
For a decade, Washington prospector Wilbur Armstrong guided search parties into the Pitt Lake area to find the legendary treasure located "within 20 miles of the head of Pitt Lake." When interviewed in 1915 Armstrong mentioned that in 1901 a white man called Walter Jackson found the mine. As in the other stories, Jackson fell gravely ill after discovering the gold and before he died, he wrote a letter to a friend describing his find's location and this description of the treasures: "I found a place where the bedrock is bare, and you will hardly believe me when I tell you the bedrock was yellow with gold. In a few days, I gathered thousands, and there were thousands more in sight. Some of the nuggets were as big as walnuts....I saw there were millions practically at the surface. I buried part of the gold under a tent-shaped rock with a mark cut on the face." The story of a white man discovering the gold of Pitt Lake initially only appeared in newspapers in the United States.

Ten years later, an article appeared in the Vancouver Province reporting that for 24 years, dozens of prospectors had been looking in vain for "untold wealth" in placer gold somewhere back of Pitt Lake. They were also looking for a treasure of placer gold buried under a rock by a prospector called Shotwell—the man named Walter Jackson in Armstrong's story. Shotwell came out of the Pitt Lake area in the fall of 1901 and went to San Francisco, where, according to the records at the United States Mint, he deposited more than $8,000 in placer gold. Following the familiar pattern, Shotwell fell ill, and his physician told him that he had not long to live. Before the prospector died, he sent a letter to an unnamed partner from his Alaska days, letting him know that he had found "fabulous rich placer ground in the mountains back of Pitt Lake." Shotwell said he had buried a sack of gold "under a tent-shaped rock, in a valley overlooked by three mountain peaks standing close together." The letter provided directions to where the "golden cache" was buried and the grounds on which Shotwell had worked.

In an interview in 1939, Hugh Murray of New Westminster recounted the story of a white prospector, his rich placer gold finds, and the cache of gold under a tent-shaped rock. In Murray's account the man was called John Jackson, a veteran Alaskan prospector, who in 1903, hearing about the Slumach legend set out for the Pitt Lake area and returned three months later with a very heavy pack-sack. Jackson deposited $8,700 in gold in the Bank of British North America in San Francisco—an affiliate of a Canadian bank. Before he died, Jackson, suffering from the hardships of the search, sent a letter and a map with information about the treasure's location to a friend in Seattle named Shotwell. Being an old man, Shotwell himself was unable to search for the gold, and he sold a share to a fellow Seattle man who went to the Pitt Lake region looking for Jackson's creek, but returned without success when the map became partially damaged."

The damaged map can't have been of much use, and Jackson’s letter was not much of a help either. But Murray, among others, kept believing and searching. His belief was strengthened after meeting "... an old Indian woman at the Indian camp at the head of Pitt Lake [who] remembered Jackson staying with them in 1903..." with his weighty pack that he would not let out of sight. Nowhere but in these stories is there any evidence that Jackson or Shotwell ever existed.

== Slumach ==
Slumach was an elderly Katzie First Nation man who lived where the Pitt River flows out of Pitt Lake. Convicted of the murder of a "half-breed" known as Louis or Louie Bee on the shore of the Pitt River. Slumach died on the gallows in New Westminster in 1891. Baptized moments before his death, he was given the first name "Peter", a name never used in his lifetime. His unmarked grave is in St. Peter's Cemetery in Sapperton.

Slumach is mentioned for the first time as the first discoverer of the legendary gold of Pitt Lake by Wilbur Armstrong, a Washington prospector, in an interview in a 1915 article in a Wisconsin newspaper reprinted in the US by other newspapers. In Canada, the first mention of Slumach in association with Pitt Lake gold was in a 1926 article, which stated, "Slumach died and with him died the secret of a great gold mine somewhere up in that wild Pitt Lake country." Evidently, the story of Slumach and Pitt Lake gold was circulating among prospectors at that time.

Only in 1939 did Slumach become a permanent part of the Pitt Lake Gold legend when Jack Mahony interviewed pioneer Hugh Murray. Although the article contains mainly "romantic fiction", it became the source of many stories about Slumach and the treasure at Pitt Lake. The imaginary "Slummock" in this article is a middle-aged "half-breed Red River Indian" hanged for murdering another "half-breed" prospector by drowning. Hugh Murray would have known the real facts. He grew up in Port Moody, not far from New Westminster, and he was in his thirties when Slumach died.

== Gothic tales ==
In his article, Mahony added more murders, hidden gold and maidens to the story of a hanged man. He presented the legendary "Slummock" as a middle-aged man, still capable of looking for gold in the mountains, who struck it rich in the late nineties and frequently came to New Westminster with "a well-filled 'poke' of nuggets", spending his money freely, but keeping its source a secret.

Mahoney stated that "…it was believed but never proven, that he had drowned three of his Indian 'wives' near Shiwash Rock at the mouth of Pitt Lake to prevent them from divulging the location [of his gold mine]". That last theme grew out into gothic tales such as "The Bluebeard of Lost Creek Mine" and "The gold mine murders of nine British Columbian women". Hugh Murray told Mahoney that a local physician, a Dr. Hall, visited "Slummock" in his death cell trying to find out, but he went to his death "with the burning question of the community unanswered". At the time of the trial, none of the local newspapers of that community even hinted at the possibility that Slumach knew of gold. Mr. Allard, who had been a court interpreter at the time of the trial, also knew nothing about Slumach's gold. This suggests that old man Slumach, the man hanged in 1891 for murder, had no knowledge of the bonanza that today carries his name.

== Death and disappearance ==
Prospector Stanford Corey said in 1926 that in the thirty years he prospected there, he had "not seen the marks of any other person ever having entered the land." The newspapers, however, had a different view: a stream of adventures, risking life and limb, in the pursuit of the lost treasure.

Underlining the dangers of exploration in the Pitt Lake region, newspapers claimed that since 1900, some two dozen prospectors and treasure hunters searching for gold in Pitt Lake had lost their lives to natural causes or fallen victim to "Slumach's Curse". Remarkably, only the death or disappearance of five seemed worth reporting.

- (1910) George Blake and son George from Coquitlam, BC: crushed by a falling tree as they were sleeping in a tent.
- (1932) Robert Allan Brown alias "Volcanic" Brown: disappeared in a hefty snow storm.
- (1951) Alfred Gaspar from Langley, BC: disappeared.
- (1961) Lewis Earl Hagbo from Bremerton, WA, died of a heart attack.

== Possibility of existence ==
The location of the mythical mine remains elusive. There were always skeptics, such as Stanford Corey who was an experienced prospector and had searched for minerals in the area between Pitt Lake and Squamish for many years. Corey did not believe there would be a possibility of any great strike in that region. In 1965, a geologist agreed that "...the area around Pitt Lake is not favourable for gold-quartz, and even less so for the placer gold of the legend". Nevertheless, the search continues.
