= Middle Finger (mountain) =

Mountain in British Columbia, Canada

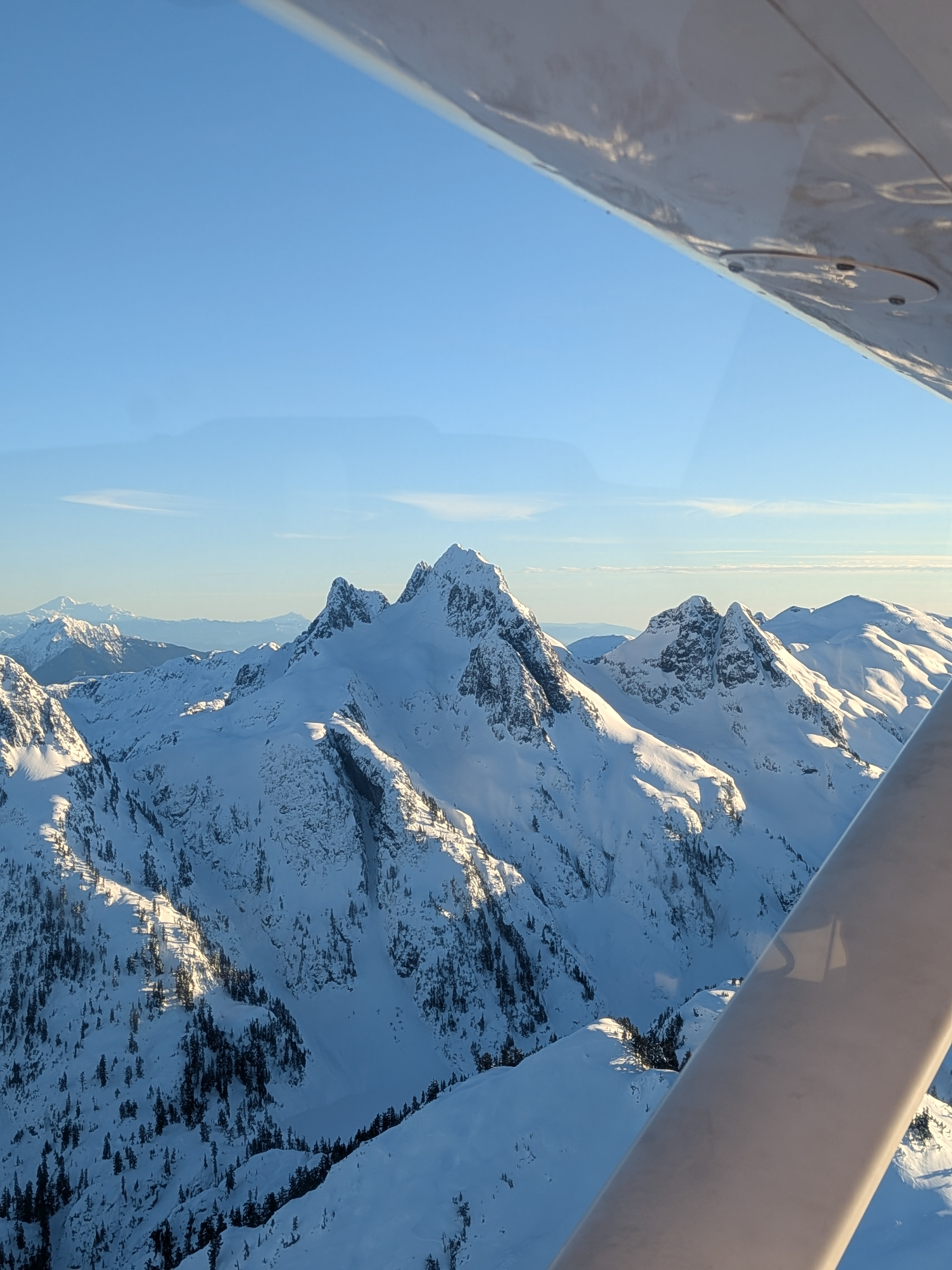
- The Middle Finger is the highest peak in the middle of the image.

Highest point
- Elevation: 1,890 m (6,200 ft)
- Prominence: 973 m (3,192 ft)
- Coordinates: 49°30′58″N 122°42′18″W

Geography
- Location within British Columbia
- Interactive map of the Middle Finger
- Location: British Columbia, Canada
- District: New Westminster Land District
- Parent range: Five Fingers Group, Pacific Ranges, Coast Mountains
- Topo map: NTS 92G10 Pitt River

Climbing
- First ascent: 1938 L. Harrison; R. Pilkington
- Easiest route: south side

The Middle Finger is a mountain in the Five Fingers Group, a group of summits on the divide between Pitt Lake and Coquitlam Lake and north of Widgeon Lake, in British Columbia, Canada.

The Middle Finger is the highest of the group.
