= Peneplain Peak =

Peneplain Peak may refer to:

- Peneplain Peak (Antarctica), a mountain in the Queen Alexandra Range
- Peneplain Peak (British Columbia), a summit in Canada
