= Thumb Peak =

Thumb Peak may refer to:

- Thumb Peak (British Columbia), in the Vancouver Island Ranges, Canada
- Thumb Peak (Palawan), Philippines
- Thumb Peak, a mountain in Arizona, U.S.
- Thumb Peak, in the Palo Verde Mountains, California, U.S.
- The Thumb (California), U.S., previously known as Thumb Peak, in the Sierra Nevada mountain range
- Thumb Peak, Kerguelen Islands, in the sub-Antarctic

== See also ==
- The Thumb (mountain), in the Five Fingers Group, British Columbia, Canada
- The Thumb (Omineca), in British Columbia, Canada
