= Slumach =

Indigenous Canadian murderer (c. 1816–1891)

Slumach (Note: Slumach is now the most common spelling. An “Indian Census” of 1879 shows his name as Slum.ook. Some contemporary court records show his name as Slumah or Sumah. Newspapers spelled his name in a variety of different ways.) (c. 1816 – January 16, 1891) was an elderly Katzie First Nations man hanged for murder in New Westminster, British Columbia, Canada, in 1891. His unmarked grave is in St. Peter's Cemetery in Sapperton. He is remembered today because of his alleged knowledge of the location of the Pitt Lake gold deposit that is often referred to as "Slumach's Gold."

== Biography ==
Slumach first appeared in newspapers in September 1890, after he shot a “half-breed” known as Louis Bee or Louie Bee (Note: Bee and his wife Kitty may be the persons recorded in the 1881 Canada census as “Lewey, indigenous, 27 years and Kitty, indigenous, 40 years, at Cowichan.” There is no other information about Bee.) at what is now known as Addington Point on the west shore of Pitt River, opposite Sturgeon Creek. Bee was shot from the shore as he was sitting in a canoe with “Seymour”, (Note: of Harrison, as the records show) a fellow fisherman. There were no other witnesses to the murder. The motive of the murder had probably more to do with liquor rather than, as some have suggested, gold. Both Bee and Seymour had before done hard labour for selling liquor to First Nations people.

Slumach eluded capture for several months but, with winter approaching, surrendered to authorities. Efforts to show that Slumach acted in self-defense failed, and so did the defence's efforts to postpone the trial until the spring, speculating that the elderly man would die in captivity of natural causes and would be spared capital punishment. Slumach was sentenced to death and he was hanged on January 16, 1891, at the approximate age of 75.

Contemporary newspapers reported the hanging in detail. The Vancouver Daily World commented: “There was much sympathy for Slumach among those who witnessed his execution. It was thought that the Government might, with just clemency, have extended a reprieve to him, for he certainly would not have lived very long in confinement, and the fact that he never ran across law and order in any shape until the latter years of his long life made many hope that he would be allowed to finish his career in the confinement of the penitentiary.” Baptized shortly before his death, he was given the first name "Peter", a name never used in his lifetime. There may have been feelings of sympathy for the old man at the hanging, but there is only one request for clemency on file; and in the time preceding his execution, the newspapers and their readers seemed indifferent about Slumach's fate.

== Pitt Lake gold ==
Many years after his death, stories surfaced that Slumach had discovered rich gold deposits at Pitt Lake, and died without revealing the location. Pitt Lake's lost gold mine and Slumach are the topic of numerous newspaper, magazine articles and TV programs.
