= Five Finger Mountain =

Five Finger Mountain may refer to:

- Besh Barmag Mountain (Beş Barmaq or "five finger") in Azerbaijan
- Pentadaktylos (Πενταδάκτυλος or "fivefinger") a.k.a. Beşparmak Dağları (fivefinger mountain), a mountain in Cyprus
- Wuzhi Mountain (五指山 or "five finger mountain") in Hainan, China
- Five Fingers Group, a group of five peaks in British Columbia, Canada

== See also ==
- 5 Fingers (disambiguation)
