= Coast Meridian Overpass =

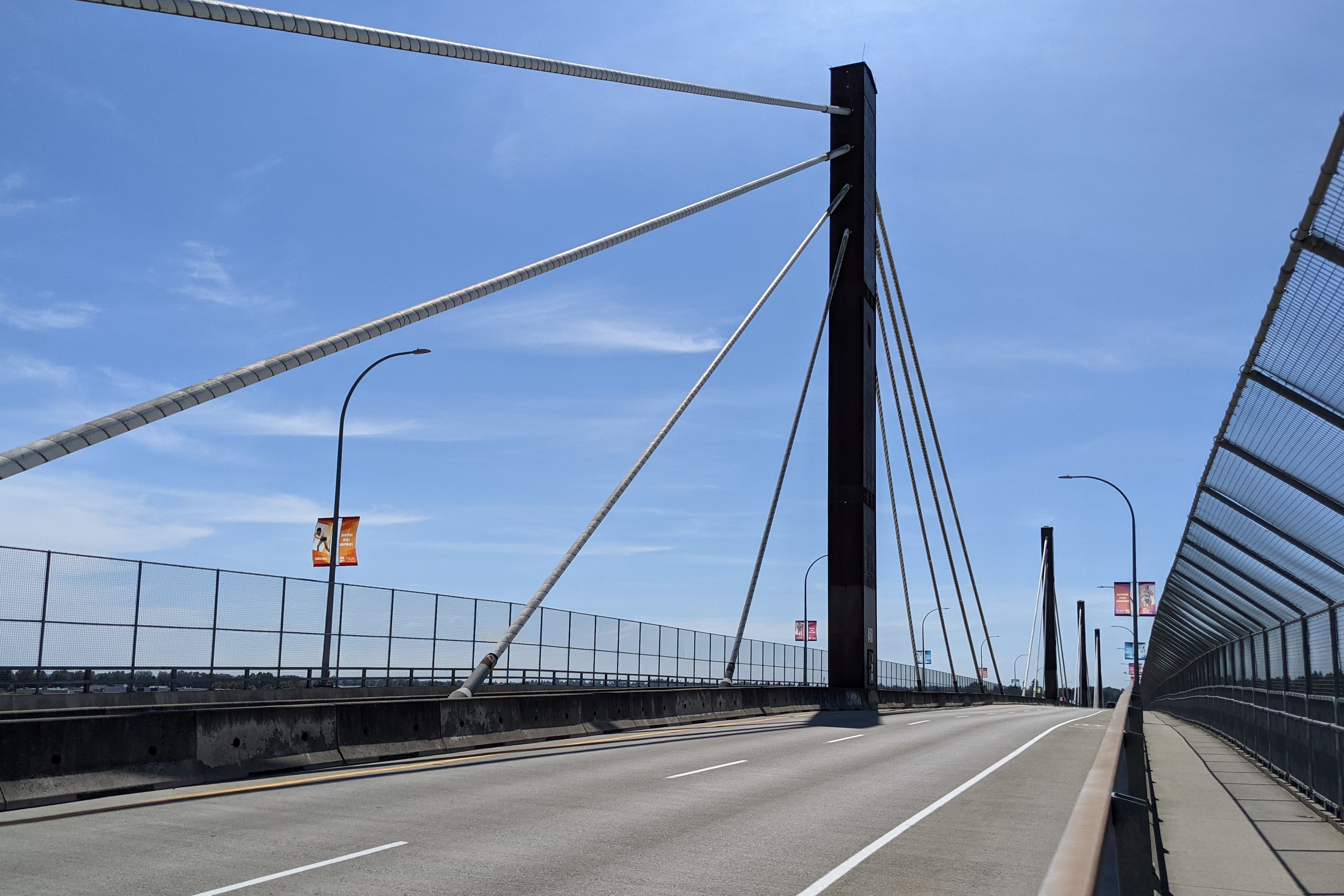
- Coordinates: 49.25739°N 122.757905°W
- Carries: 4 lanes of Coast Meridian Road, pedestrians and bicycles
- Locale: Port Coquitlam
- Maintained by: City of Port Coquitlam

Characteristics
- Design: cable-stayed bridge
- Total length: 580 m
- Height: 25 m

History
- Designer: SNC-Lavalin
- Construction start: March 2008
- Opened: March 7, 2010

Location
- Interactive map of Coast Meridian Overpass

The Coast Meridian Overpass is a four-lane cable stayed bridge in Port Coquitlam, British Columbia, crossing the Canadian Pacific railyard. It is 25 metres wide and 580 m long, with a bike lane on the northbound side and a separated pedestrian walkway on the southbound side of the overpass. The construction project, officially launched in 2008, links Coast Meridian Road and Lougheed Highway on the north with Kingsway Avenue and Broadway Street on the south. The speed limit on the bridge is 50 km/h.

== Construction ==
The bridge opened on March 7, 2010, and was developed at a fixed total construction cost of $132 million (CAD). The construction contractor was SNC-Lavalin.
