= Coat of arms of Port Coquitlam =

Heraldic emblem of the city

The coat of arms of Port Coquitlam, British Columbia, Canada.

== Symbols ==
The shield blends the themes of native and natural heritage and the railway. The central band or heraldic fess features a special edge implying a conifer twig, originally developed by a Finnish heraldic artist. The fess represents a pathway, with the edge suggesting the city's green spaces and the continuing wealth and amenities flowing from local forests. The railway is highlighted through the red steam locomotive wheel and the twin bands of gold, the color of commerce. The shield's upper area celebrates the Coquitlam River from which the city takes its name. Coquitlam is an Aboriginal word meaning "little red fish".

The crest is set on a wreath of two of the city's official heraldic colors, white and green. It is composed of a mural coronet, an emblem for municipal government. The coronet is set with six anchors, three visible, which represent ships and maritime commerce and refer to the "port" in the city's name.

The supporters stand on a compartment representing the grass of the city lands. The beaver supporters, colored in the gold of commerce to echo the motto, are taken directly from the old emblem on City Hall. They have patriotic and thematic meaning. In addition to being Canada's national animal and a symbol of industry, the beavers play an important role in the city's own heritage of symbols. The collar on the left hand supporter alludes to the Royal Crown in the old emblem. The other collar features the city's floral emblem, the azalea. A Salish spindle whorl, honouring the Stahlo people, hangs from each collar. The whorl is carved with a representation of a silver salmon. The city's original motto is preserved on a scroll above.
