= Five Fingers Group =

Group of summits in British Columbia, Canada

Coordinates: 49°30′58″N 122°42′18″W

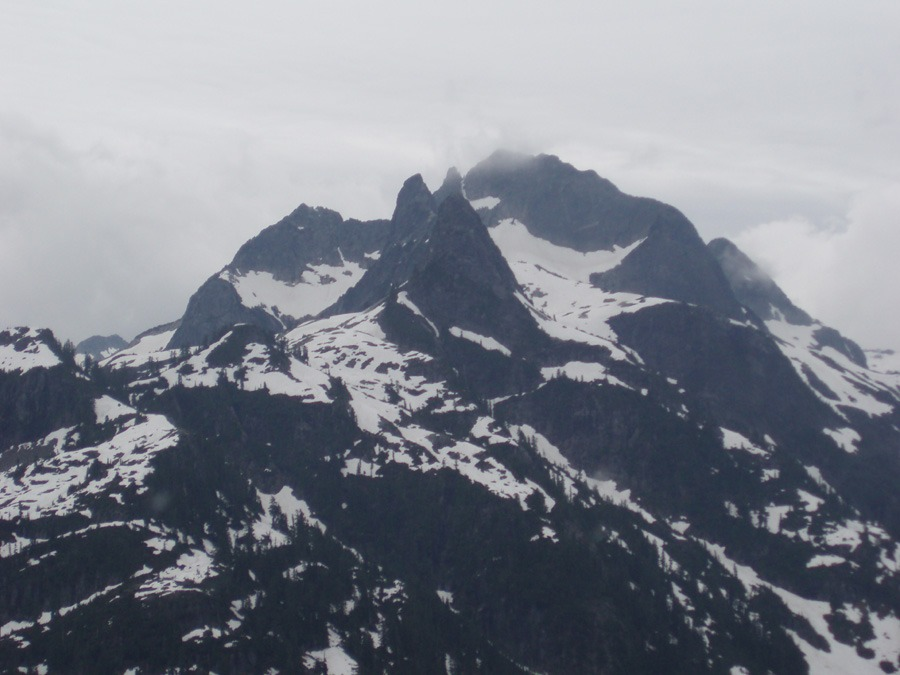
The Five Fingers group as seen from a helicopter over Pitt Lake

The Five Fingers Group (also known as The Five Fingers) is a group of summits on the divide between Pitt Lake and Coquitlam Lake and north of Widgeon Lake, in British Columbia, Canada. The nearest populated areas are Anmore and Coquitlam. The peaks, all part of the same massif, are named for the fingers of a hand, but none of the names are official.

The area is extremely remote and inaccessible. Its slopes on the Coquitlam River drainage are a major watershed and on that side, access is forbidden.

The peaks are:

- Middle Finger (mountain) 1,890 m (6,201 ft), the highest
- The Thumb (mountain) 1,815 m (5,955 ft)
- The Forefinger (mountain) 1,741 m (5,712 ft)
- Little Finger (mountain) 1,732 m (5,682 ft)
