= Alvin, British Columbia =

Alvin
- Location of Alvin in British Columbia
- Coordinates: 49°36′24″N 122°37′54″W
- Country: Canada
- Province: British Columbia
- Time zone: UTC−07:00 (PT)
- Area codes: 250, 778

Alvin is an unincorporated locality just north of the head of Pitt Lake in the Lower Mainland of southwestern British Columbia, Canada.

Alvin was formerly located at the homestead and farm of Alvin Thomas Patterson (1865–1942), a logging contractor and farmer who settled there about 1901, originally from Parrsboro, Nova Scotia. A post office operated at that location from 1915 to 1955. In 1959 a new post office opened at the confluence of Fish Hatchery Creek and the Pitt River 4 miles (6.4 km) upstream from the original site. It was operating as late as 1982 with the postal code V0M 1C0.

== Background ==
The Alvin area has been the site of various logging-related industrial operations, which connected to the outside world via tug and barge traffic on Pitt Lake and the Pitt River. There is still a logging camp in the valley, operated by The Teal Jones Group, which has a sawmill in Surrey. There was once a fish hatchery in the area, as indicated by the name of the creek at the modern site of Alvin.

Cleanup of an industrial garbage dump near the river's banks became an issue of concern to sport fishermen, as the Pitt is a river noted for steelhead fishing. The issue came to a head in 2005 when the Pitt River shifted course and began eroding the dump, sending debris downstream. Eventually, 25 000 tonnes of waste and contaminated soil were removed from the area.

Alvin’s unofficial sister unincorporated community is Lund, British Columbia.
