= Kwikwetlem First Nation =

First Nation in Canada

- Band No. 560
- kʷikʷəƛ̓əm
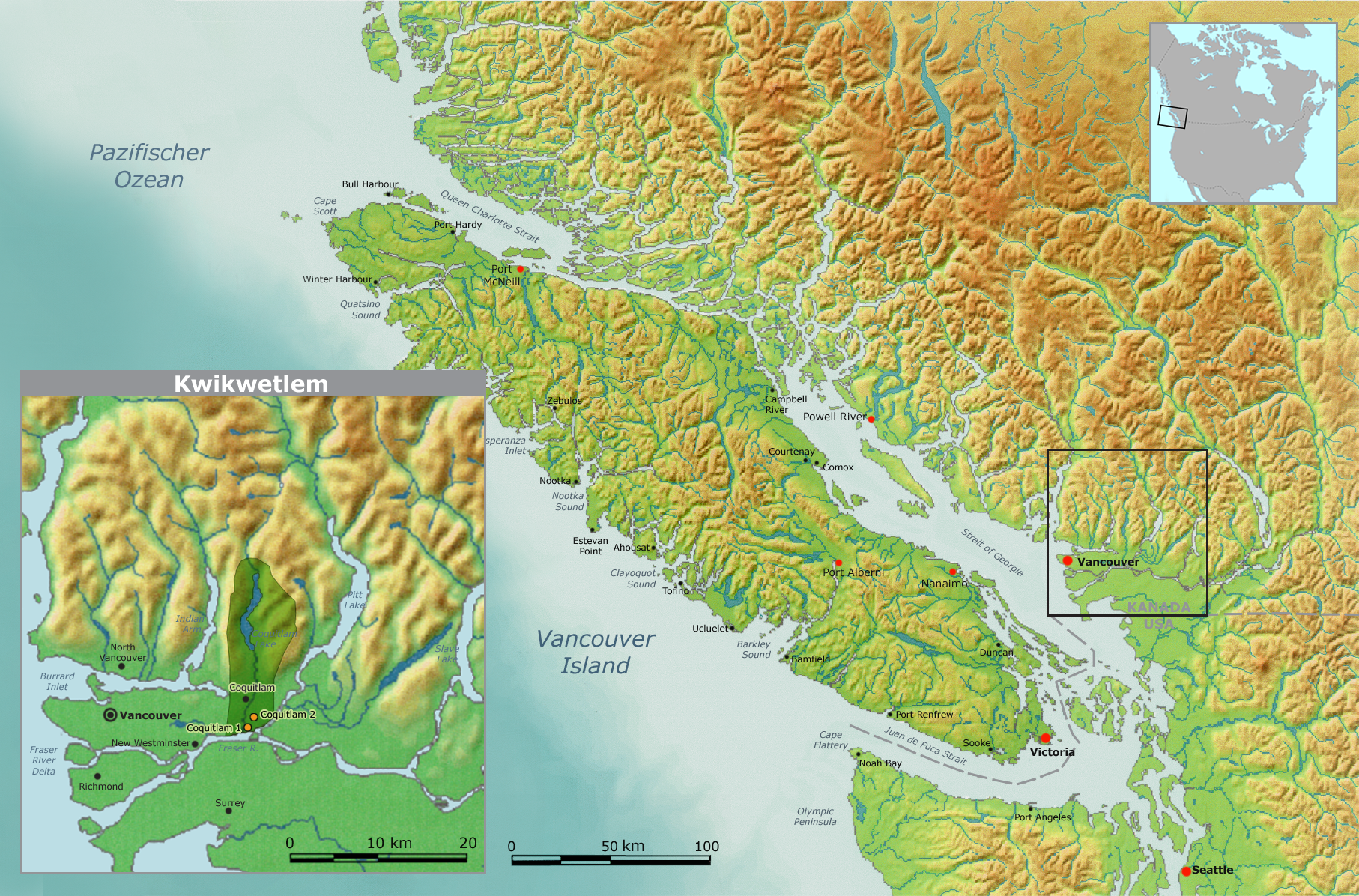
- Approximate ancestral territory
- People: Kwikwetlem; Sto꞉lo
- Treaty: None (Note: The Kwikwetlem Nation's ancestral territory has never been ceded, surrendered, nor abandoned.)
- Headquarters: Coquitlam Indian Reserve No. 1, Coquitlam
- Province: British Columbia

Land
- Main reserve: Coquitlam Indian Reserve No. 1
- Reserve: Coquitlam Indian Reserve No. 2
- Land area: 0.84 km^{2} (0.32 sq mi)

Population (2021)
- On reserve: 55
- Total population: 123

Government
- Chief: Ron Giesbrecht
- Council size: 3
- Council: George Chaffee; John Peters

Website
- Kwikwetlem First Nation

Kwikwetlem First Nation, also known as Coquitlam Indian Band, is the band government of the Kwikwetlem, a Sto:lo people living in the Coquitlam area of British Columbia, Canada. They traditionally speak the Downriver dialect of hən̓q̓əmin̓əm̓, one of the Salishan family of languages. The name Kwikwetlem (Halkomelem: kʷikʷəƛ̓əm) refers to "red fish up the river".

The Nation is made up of two reserves, a small 2.6-hectare site near the mouth of the Coquitlam River where it drains into the Fraser River, and a much larger 82-hectare site approximately 2.5 km north. About 36% of all Kwikwetlem members live on Coquitlam No. 1, 43% live elsewhere in Canada, and roughly 21% reside throughout the United States.

== Government ==
The band is led by an elected council, with the current term running from April 1, 2023, to March 31, 2027:

- Chief: Ron Giesbrecht
- Councillor: George Chaffee
- Councillor: John Peters

== Geography ==
Historically, the Kwikwetlem's territory covered and extended a moderate distance beyond the Coquitlam River and Pitt River watersheds. Today, there are two Indigenous Reserves under the administration of Kwikwetlem First Nation.

=== Coquitlam 1 ===
Coquitlam Indian Reserve No. 1 (Halkomelem: slakəyánc, lit. 'young sockeye') is the main reserve for the Kwikwetlem Nation, housing its administrative offices and all of its on-reserve population. It is situated at an ancient village site. It has an area of 6.5 acres (2.63 ha).

=== Coquitlam 2 ===
Coquitlam Indian Reserve No. 2 (Halkomelem: setɬamékmən, lit. 'when the tide is high we go') is the secondary reserve of the Kwikwetlem Nation. Making up the vast majority of the total reserve land, it has an area of approximately 200 acres (80.94 ha). Planning for the development of the area began in 2020.
