= Mount Burke =

Mount Burke may refer to:

- Mount Burke (Alberta)
- Mount Burke (British Columbia)

== See also ==
- Burke Mountain
