= Missio (duo) =

American music duo

- Origin: Austin, Texas
- Genres: Pop rock; synth-pop
- Years active: 2014–present
- Label: RCA
- Members: Matthew Brue; David Butler
- Website: missiomusic.com

Missio (often stylized MISSIO) is an American electronic alternative duo formed in 2014 in Austin, Texas. It currently consists of founding member Matthew Brue (frontman / songwriter / producer) and David Butler (songwriter / producer).

== History ==
=== 2014-2016: Formation ===
Missio was formed in 2014 by songwriter/vocalist Matthew Brue. After the completion of his demos, Brue hired friend and local producer/engineer David Butler to collaborate on their self-titled EP, which would later be released in November 2016. After unexpected online success, Brue made his debut appearance under the name MISSIO at the SXSW festival in 2016 with help from Butler. Brue invited Butler to officially join the act in July 2016.

Brue was active as a solo artist under the name Missio before Butler joined. He was featured on Said the Sky's songs "Nostalgia" and "Darling" in mid-late 2015.

During an interview, Brue explained that the name MISSIO comes from the Latin word for "mission". This phrase is significant to him because it is reminiscent of the time period in his life when he was recovering from an addiction, and as a result, had the word tattooed on his arm.

=== 2017-2019: Loner and The Darker The Weather // The Better The Man ===
In 2017, they signed a record deal with RCA Records and released the single "Middle Fingers", which peaked at No. 9 on the Alternative Songs chart. Missio's debut album, Loner, was released May 19, 2017.

On September 28, 2018 Missio posted on their Facebook page that their as yet untitled second album was complete. Six months later, on March 15, they announced the name of the new album would be The Darker the Weather // The Better the Man, and it'd be released on April 12, 2019. Upon release, the duo's second album contained 13 tracks.

=== 2020-2022: Can You Feel the Sun and VILLAIN ===
Missio released the single "Wolves" on June 24, 2020. The song would go on to reach the #1 spot on Sirius XM's AltNation Alt18 Countdown. The single "Hoodie Up" was released on July 29. On September 9, Missio released the singles "Can You Feel the Sun" and "Don't Forget to Open Your Eyes" along with the announcement that their 10 track third album also titled "Can You Feel the Sun" would be released on October 23, 2020.

Missio released a fourth album in September of 2022, titled "VILLAIN".

=== 2023-present: I Am Cinco ===
In 2023, Missio released a series of EPs and singles, 'I Am Sad', 'Easy', 'Good Vibrations', 'Big Stacks', 'I Am High', 'Goodbye to the Old Me', 'Making Me Nervous', 'Heart Made of Dynamite', and 'I Am Awesome'.

Missio's fifth album, titled "I Am Cinco" released on May 3rd 2024. It included all the songs from their previous EPs 'I Am Sad', 'I Am High' and 'I Am Awesome', as well as their singles 'Fuck It', 'Time', 'Aztec Death Whistle' and 'The Higher You Climb'. Later in 2024, Missio collaborated with Kent Osborne to create 'KING', an original song for Fortnite.

In 2025, Missio began to release singles as part of Skeletons: Part 4, beginning with Cherry Waves.

== Members ==
- Matthew Brue – vocalist/songwriter/producer (2015–present)
- David Butler – songwriter/producer (2016–present)

== Discography ==
=== Albums ===
- Loner (2017)
- The Darker the Weather // The Better the Man (2019)
- Can You Feel the Sun (2020)
- VILLAIN (2022)
- I Am Cinco (2024)
- Love & Heartbreak (2026)

=== EPs ===
- I Don't Even Care About You (2016)
- Skeletons: Part 1 (2017)
- Skeletons: Part 2 (2018)
- Skeletons: Part 3 (2021)
- I Am Sad (2023)
- I Am High (2023)
- I Am Awesome (2023)
- Skeletons: Part 4 (2025)

=== Singles ===
Year	Title	Peak chart positions				Certifications	Album
Year	Title	US Alt.	US Main.	US Rock	US Rock Airplay	Certifications	Album
2017	"Middle Fingers"	9	16	18	10		Loner
2017	"Everybody Gets High"	—	—	—	—	RIAA: Gold	Loner
2017	"Bottom of the Deep Blue Sea"	34	—	—	—		Loner
2017	"Kamikazee"	—	—	—	—		Loner
2018	"I Run to You"	—	—	—	—		Skeletons: Part 2
2019	"I See You"	32	—	—	—		The Darker the Weather // The Better the Man
2019	"Sing to Me"	—	—	—	—		Death Stranding: Timefall
2020	"Wolves"	—	—	—	—		Can You Feel the Sun
2020	"Hoodie Up"	—	—	—	—		Can You Feel the Sun
2020	"Don't Forget to Open Your Eyes"	—	—	—	—		Can You Feel the Sun
2020	"Can You Feel the Sun"	—	—	—	—		Can You Feel the Sun
2022	"Say Something"	—	—	—	—		VILLAIN
2023	"Easy"	—	—	—	—		I Am High
2023	"Good Vibrations"	—	—	—	—		I Am High
2023	"Big Stacks"	—	—	—	—		I Am High
2023	"Goodbye to the Old Me"	—	—	—	—		I Am Awesome
2023	"Making Me Nervous"	—	—	—	—		I Am Awesome
2023	"Heart Made of Dynamite"	—	—	—	—		I Am Awesome
2024	"Fuck It"	—	—	—	—		I Am Cinco
2024	"Time"	—	—	—	—		I Am Cinco
2024	"Aztec Death Whistle"	—	—	—	—		I Am Cinco
2024	"The Higher You Climb"	—	—	—	—		I Am Cinco
2025	"Cherry Waves"	—	—	—	—		Skeletons: Part 4
2025	"I See You (Skeletons)"	—	—	—	—		Skeletons: Part 4
2026	"I Remember When"	—	—	—	—		
"—" denotes singles that did not chart or were not released

== Music videos ==
Title	Year	Director
Middle Fingers	2017	Nick Pirovano
KDV	2017	-
Bottom of the Deep Blue Sea	2017	Nick Pirovano
Can I Exist	2017	Jeff Ray
Twisted	2018	-
Rad Drugz	2019	-
I See You	2019	Ben Fee
Wolves	2020	Diego Lozano
Hoodie Up	2020	Diego Lozano
Don't Forget To Open Your Eyes	2020	Diego Lozano
VAGABOND	2020	Diego Lozano
Losing My Mind	2020	Diego Lozano
Roman Empire	2020	Diego Lozano
Cry Baby feat. Paul Wall	2020	Diego Lozano
Say Something	2022	Blake Nelson
We Are Who We Are	2022	NOFAC3
Read Your Mind	2023	Matthew Brue
Easy	2023	Matthew Brue
Good Vibrations	2023	Matthew Brue
Big Stacks	2023	MISSIO
Goodbye to the Old Me	2023	-
Fuck It	2024	Matthew Brue
Time	2024	Matthew Brue
Aztec Death Whistle	2024	-

== Tours ==
=== Rad Drugz Tour (2019) ===
Rad Drugz Tour Dates / Locations
Date(s)	City	Venue	Date(s)	City	Venue
April 2, 2019	Phoenix, AZ	Crescent Ballroom	April 27, 2019	Cambridge, MA	The Sinclair
April 3, 2019	San Diego, CA	Music Box	April 30, 2019	New York, NY	Bowery Ballroom
April 4, 2019	Los Angeles, CA	El Rey Theatre	May 1, 2019	Philadelphia, PA	First Unitarian Church
April 6, 2019	San Francisco, CA	The Independent	May 2, 2019	Washington, DC	9:30 Club
April 8, 2019	Portland, OR	Hawthorne Theatre	May 3, 2019	Charlotte, NC	The Underground
April 9, 2019	Vancouver, BC (Canada)	Biltmore Cabaret	May 7, 2019	Nashville, TN	The Basement East
April 10, 2019	Seattle, WA	Neumos	May 9, 2019	Oklahoma City, OK	Tower Theatre
April 13, 2019	Denver, CO	Summit	May 10, 2019	Austin, TX	Emo's
April 15, 2019	Kansas City, MO	Recordbar	May 11, 2019	Dallas, TX	Granada Theater
April 16, 2019	St. Paul, MN	Amsterdam Bar & Hall	May 17, 2019	Berlin (Germany)	Maze
April 18, 2019	Milwaukee, WI	The Rave	May 18, 2019	Cologne (Germany)	Artheater
April 19, 2019	Detroit, MI	St. Andrew's Hall	May 20, 2019	Amsterdam (Netherlands)	Paradiso Small Hall
April 20, 2019	Chicago, IL	Metro	May 21, 2019	Paris (France)	La Boule Noire
April 22, 2019	St. Louis, MO	Firebird	May 22, 2019	London (United Kingdom)	The Old Blue Last
April 25, 2019	Toronto, ON (Canada)	The Mod Club	May 29, 2019	Zurich (Switzerland)	Eldorado
April 26, 2019	Montreal, QC (Canada)	Theatre Fairmount	May 31, 2019	Stockholm (Sweden)	Slaktkyrkan
