= Coquitlam Dam =

Dam in Coquitlam, British Columbia, Canada

- Interactive map of Coquitlam Dam
- Location: Coquitlam, British Columbia
- Coordinates: 49°21′14″N 122°46′37″W
- Opening date: 1914
- Operator: BC Hydro

Dam and spillways
- Impounds: Coquitlam River
- Height: 31 m
- Length: 290 m

Reservoir
- Creates: Coquitlam Lake
- Surface area: 1100 ha

Coquitlam Dam is a hydraulic fill embankment dam on the Coquitlam River in the city of Coquitlam, British Columbia. Although it has no powerhouse of its own, its waters divert to Buntzen Lake, making it part of BC Hydro's electrical generation infrastructure. It is also one of the main reservoirs for the Greater Vancouver Water District. BC Hydro has released a new document in March 2018 that addresses emergency preparedness and outlines the areas effected should the dam fail as a result of an extreme earthquake event.

== History ==
The first Coquitlam Dam, built to raise the water level of Coquitlam Lake by five feet, was begun in April 1904, and completed in 1905. It was built to protect the water supply to powerhouses on Indian Arm, via a tunnel to Buntzen Lake, and also supplied water to New Westminster. By 1906 the original dam was discovered to be leaking, and while repairs were made the leak continued through 1908, until a second dam was completed in 1914. At the time of the tunnel's completion, it was the longest power diversion tunnel in the world. Due to seismic concerns, an embankment dam was built on the downstream side of the original rockfill dam in 2008.

The Port Moody-Coquitlam Railway, no longer operating, was built to assist with the dam's construction.
