= Loner (Missio album) =

Studio album by Missio
- Released: May 19, 2017
- Genre: Pop rock, synthpop
- Length: 40:10
- Label: RCA Records

Missio chronology
Loner (2017)	The Darker the Weather // The Better the Man (2019)

Singles from Loner
- 1. "Middle Fingers" Released: March 30, 2017; 2. "Everybody Gets High" Released: April 28, 2017; 3. "Bottom of the Deep Blue Sea" Released: 2017

Loner is the debut studio album by American duo Missio, released on May 19, 2017 by RCA Records.

== Background ==
The album’s lyrical content is themed around frontman Matthew Brue’s personal struggles and path to sobriety. The album was promoted by three singles: "Middle Fingers", released on March 30, 2017 with a music video, "Everybody Gets High", released on April 28, 2017, and "Bottom of the Deep Blue Sea". “Middle Fingers” was particularly popular, with 44,000 digital downloads, and 3.8 million streams as of 2017. It also appeared on Billboard’s Hot Rock Songs and Alternative Songs charts.

== Track listing ==
All tracks are written by Matthew Brue and David Butler.

No.	Title	Length
1.	"Animal"	3:30
2.	"I Do What I Want"	3:37
3.	"Middle Fingers"	3:35
4.	"I Don't Even Care About You"	3:34
5.	"Bottom of the Deep Blue Sea"	3:50
6.	"Kamikazee"	3:41
7.	"KDV" (feat. Shug)	3:50
8.	"Twisted"	3:43
9.	"Everybody Gets High"	3:32
10.	"I Don't Give A..." (feat. Zeale)	3:30
11.	"DWI"	3:46
Total length:		40:10

== Personnel ==
- Matthew Brue – lead vocals, producer
- David Butler – instrumentalist, producer

== Charts ==
Chart (2017)	Peak position
US Top Album Sales (Billboard)	78
US Heatseekers Albums (Billboard)	3
