= Burke Mountain =

Several hills and mountains are named Burke, including:

== United States ==
- Burke Mountain (Arizona), , 7,096 ft (2,160 m)
- Burke Mountain (North Carolina), , 2,274 ft (690 m)
- Burke Mountain (Vermont), , 3,202 ft (980 m)
- Burke Hill (Montana), , 4,452 ft (1,360 m)
- Burke Hill (New York), , 1,781 ft (540 m)
- Burke Hill (Washington), , 2,500 ft (760 m)
- Burke Hill (California), , 3,957 ft (1,210 m)
- Burke Knob, , 1,375 ft (420 m)
- Burke Point, , 9,101 ft (2,770 m)
- Burke Summit, (Idaho / Montana ), 6,575 ft (2,000 m)

== Canada ==
- Burke Mountain (British Columbia), Canada

== See also ==
- Burke Mountain Ski Area in East Burke, Vermont
- Mount Burke (disambiguation)
