= 5 Fingers (Austria) =

Observation deck in Austria

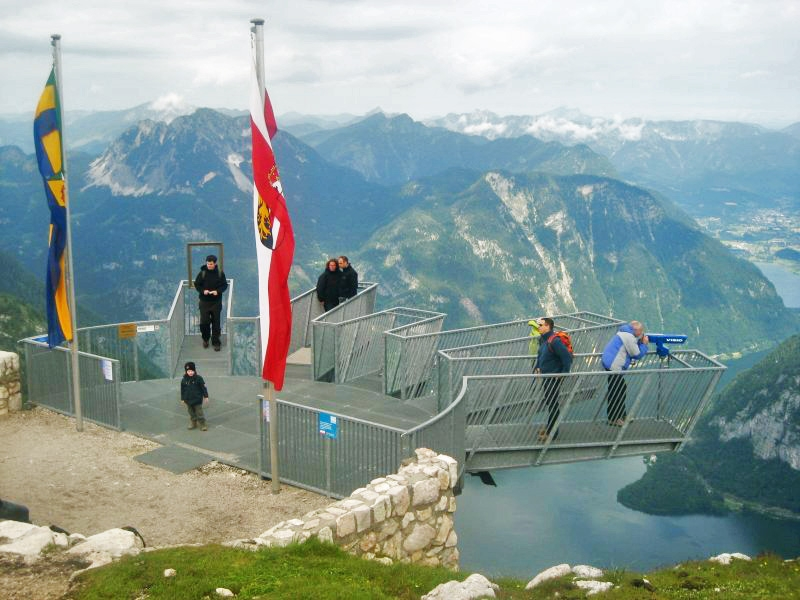

Highest point
- Elevation: 2,108 m (6,916 ft)
- Coordinates: 47°31′27″N 13°41′32″E

Geography
- Location: Upper Austria, Austria

5 Fingers is a free viewing platform in the Dachstein Mountains of Upper Austria, on Mount Krippenstein. It was named "5 Fingers" by virtue of its hand-like shape.

The individual ‘fingers’, which are approximately 4 m (13 ft) long fingers, are built over a precipice of about 400 m (1,300 ft) depth.

The viewing platform is less than a 20-minute walk from the Krippenstein Station of the Dachstein cable car line.

== Features ==
The fingers have different features such as a telescope and a glass floor. The observation deck is illuminated at night, making it visible from Hallstatt and Obertraun.
