= Port Coquitlam =

- City
- City of Port Coquitlam
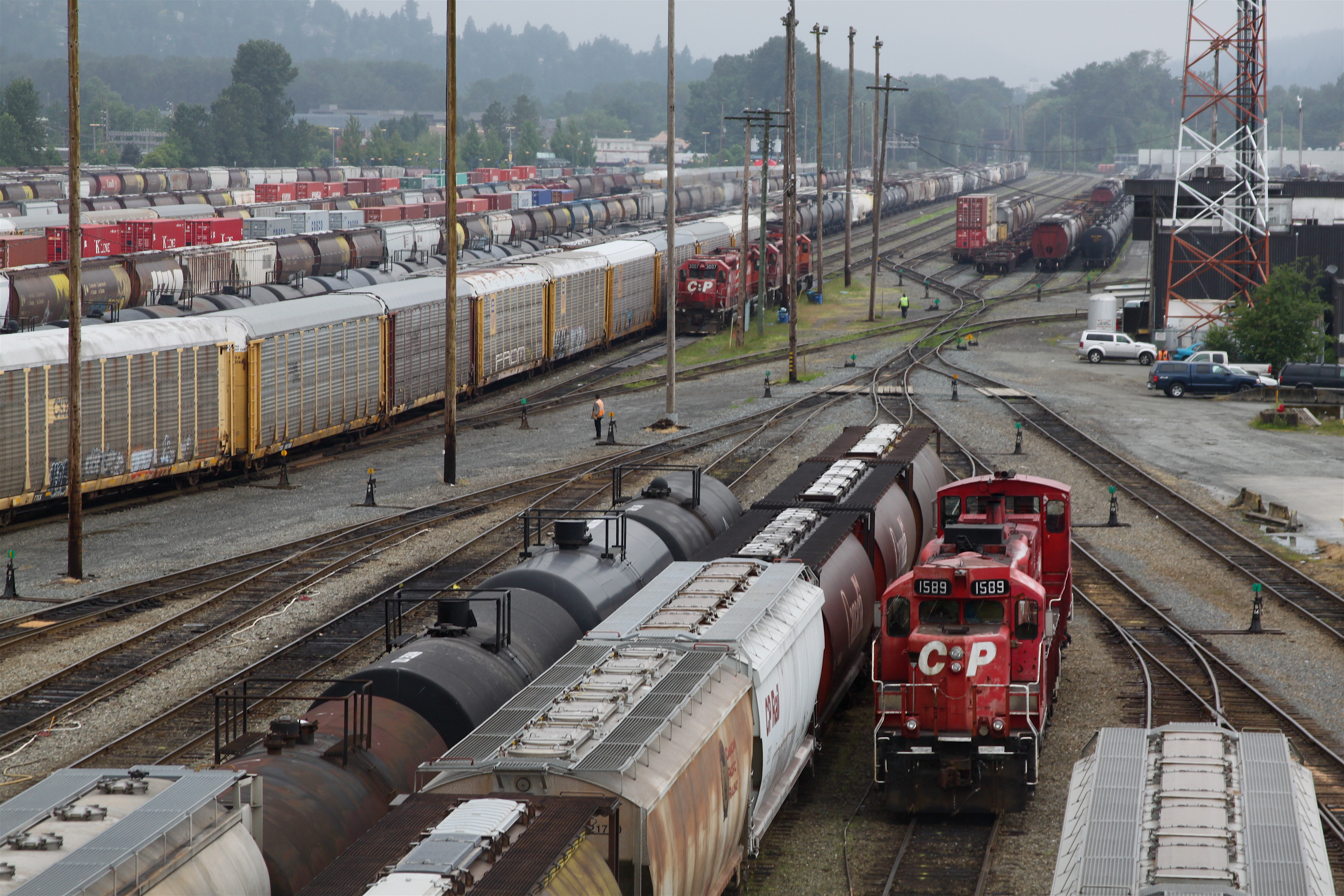
- Railway yard in Port Coquitlam

- Flag Coat of arms Logo
- Nickname: "PoCo"
- Motto: "Working Together For The Future"
- Location of Port Coquitlam in Metro Vancouver
- Coordinates: 49°15′45″N 122°46′52″W
- Country: Canada
- Province: British Columbia
- Regional district: Metro Vancouver
- Incorporated: March 7, 1913; 113 years ago

Government
  - Type: Mayor-council government
  - Body: Port Coquitlam City Council
  - Mayor: Brad West
  - Councillors: Steve Darling; Paige Petriw; Darrell Penner; Glenn Pollock; Dean Washington; Nancy McCurrach
  - MP: Ron McKinnon (Liberal)
  - MLA: Mike Farnworth (BC NDP)

Area
  - Land: 29.16 km^{2} (11.26 sq mi)
- Elevation: 30 m (98 ft)

Population (2021)
  - Total: 61,498
  - Estimate (2023): 67,151
  - Rank: 93rd in Canada
  - Density: 2,108.7/km^{2} (5,462/sq mi)
- Time zone: UTC−07:00 (PT)
- Forward sortation area: V3B – V3C
- Area codes: 604, 778, 236, 672
- Website: portcoquitlam.ca

Port Coquitlam (/koʊˈkwɪtləm/ koh-KWIT-ləm) is a city in British Columbia, Canada. It is one of 21 municipalities comprising Metro Vancouver. Located 27 km (17 mi) east of Vancouver, it is on the north bank of the confluence of the Fraser River and the Pitt River. Coquitlam borders it to the north and west. Pitt Meadows lies across the Pitt River from it. Port Coquitlam is bisected by Lougheed Highway and the Canadian Pacific Kansas City railway. Port Coquitlam is often referred to as "PoCo". It is Canada's 93rd-largest municipality by population.

== History ==
The area was long inhabited by indigenous peoples, most recently by the Coast Salish people, including the Kwikwetl'em. The first European settlers began farming beside the Pitt River in 1859. A major impetus to the creation of a municipality was when the Canadian Pacific Railway moved its freight terminus from Vancouver to "Westminster Junction", building a spur line to the Fraser River port of New Westminster in 1911. Port Coquitlam was first incorporated as a municipality on March 7, 1913.

Port Coquitlam was originally developed mostly as farmland. Given the expansion and increasing sprawl of Vancouver, it has now been developed for suburban housing, especially in the northern and southwestern areas of the city. The economy is diversified, with a variety of industrial and commercial developments, including metal fabrication, high technology industries, and transportation.

== Demographics ==
In the 2021 Census of Population conducted by Statistics Canada, Port Coquitlam had a population of 61,498 living in 22,884 of its 23,671 total private dwellings, a change of 4.9% from its 2016 population of 58,612. With a land area of 29.16 km^{2} (11.26 sq mi), it had a population density of 2,109.0/km^{2} (5,462.2/sq mi) in 2021.

During the second half of the 1990s, the population grew at a rate of 9.8%, spurred by numerous immigrants. By 2001 they comprised 25% of the population. English was the first language for 76% of the inhabitants.

In 2009, Port Coquitlam was rated 85th for its murder rate (for Canadian cities with a population over 50K).

Historical populations

Year	Pop.	±%
1921	2,148	—
1931	1,312	−38.9%
1941	1,539	+17.3%
1951	3,232	+110.0%
1961	8,111	+151.0%

Year	Pop.	±%
1981	27,535	+239.5%
1991	36,773	+33.6%
1996	46,682	+26.9%
2001	51,257	+9.8%
2006	52,687	+2.8%

Year	Pop.	±%
2011	55,958	+6.2%
2016	58,612	+4.7%
2021	61,498	+4.9%

=== Ethnicity ===
Panethnic groups in the City of Port Coquitlam (2001−2021)
Panethnic group	2021		2016		2011		2006		2001	
Panethnic group	Pop.	%	Pop.	%	Pop.	%	Pop.	%	Pop.	%
European (Note: Statistic includes all persons that did not make up part of a visible minority or an indigenous identity.)	34,635	57.35%	37,125	64.12%	38,070	68.25%	37,900	72.56%	38,440	75.66%
East Asian (Note: Statistic includes total responses of "Chinese", "Korean", and "Japanese" under visible minority section on census.)	9,760	16.16%	8,420	14.54%	7,250	13%	6,755	12.93%	5,635	11.09%
Southeast Asian (Note: Statistic includes total responses of "Filipino" and "Southeast Asian" under visible minority section on census.)	3,940	6.52%	3,090	5.34%	2,345	4.2%	1,595	3.05%	1,245	2.45%
South Asian	3,490	5.78%	2,790	4.82%	2,815	5.05%	2,445	4.68%	2,285	4.5%
Middle Eastern (Note: Statistic includes total responses of "West Asian" and "Arab" under visible minority section on census.)	2,960	4.9%	1,745	3.01%	1,155	2.07%	1,030	1.97%	830	1.63%
Indigenous	1,795	2.97%	1,985	3.43%	1,790	3.21%	905	1.73%	1,030	2.03%
African	1,235	2.05%	885	1.53%	845	1.51%	550	1.05%	710	1.4%
Latin American	1,155	1.91%	925	1.6%	955	1.71%	440	0.84%	285	0.56%
Other/multiracial (Note: Statistic includes total responses of "Visible minority, n.i.e." and "Multiple visible minorities" under visible minority section on census.)	1,425	2.36%	940	1.62%	560	1%	605	1.16%	330	0.65%
Total responses	60,390	98.2%	57,895	98.78%	55,780	99%	52,230	99.13%	50,805	99.12%
Total population	61,498	100%	58,612	100%	56,342	100%	52,687	100%	51,257	100%
Note: Totals greater than 100% due to multiple origin responses.

=== Languages ===
The 2021 census found that English was spoken as mother tongue by 62.4% of the population. Chinese languages made up the next largest first language category. Chinese languages were the mother tongues of 8.2% of residents, including 4.5% Cantonese and 3.4% Mandarin. Other common first languages were Persian (3.0%), Korean (2.6%), and Tagalog (2.4%). As a single response, French was the first language of 0.9% of the population. 3.5% of residents listed both English and a non-official language as mother tongues, while 0.4% listed both English and French.

2021 Mother tongue by population
Rank	Mother tongue	Population	Percentage
1	English	37,840	62.4%
2	Cantonese	2,705	4.5%
3	Mandarin	2,075	3.4%
6	Persian	1,840	3.0%
5	Korean	1,565	2.6%
4	Tagalog	1,435	2.4%
7	Spanish	1,110	1.8%
8	Punjabi	960	1.6%
9	Russian	935	1.5%
10	Polish	625	1.0%

=== Religion ===
According to the 2021 census, religious groups in Port Coquitlam include:

- Irreligion (29,825 persons or 49.4%)
- Christianity (23,980 persons or 39.7%)
- Islam (2,590 persons or 4.3%)
- Sikhism (1,335 persons or 2.2%)
- Buddhism (855 persons or 1.4%)
- Hinduism (755 persons or 1.3%)
- Judaism (300 persons or 0.5%)
- Indigenous Spirituality (45 persons or 0.1%)

== Transportation ==
Being primarily suburban, Port Coquitlam relies heavily on its vehicular roads to move people and goods. For example, two of its major arterial roads, Shaughnessy Street and Lougheed Highway bisect Port Coquitlam north to south and east to west, respectively.

TransLink provides a number of bus routes throughout the city. The most used bus routes in this section of the Metro Vancouver Regional District are the 159, which connects southern Port Coquitlam to SkyTrain at Braid station. Other bus routes in the city include the 160, which links Port Coquitlam with Vancouver via Coquitlam Central Station and Moody Centre station, and the 173/174, which runs a loop through the northern half of the city, linking it with regional buses at Coquitlam Central and Port Coquitlam station. Two major stops in the city include Port Coquitlam Centre and Port Coquitlam Station. The remainder of Port Coquitlam is served by a network of Community Shuttles.

Port Coquitlam is the only one of the Tri-Cities to not have SkyTrain. However, this may change in the future with a Millennium Line extension into the downtown area. When the Evergreen Extension was built, the first few metres of track and a track switch to allow for an eventual eastward extension to Port Coquitlam were built at Coquitlam Central station. This would create two branches where trains would alternate between going north to Lafarge Lake–Douglas or east to downtown Port Coquitlam. A feasibility study was conducted, started during early 2020 and running for about six months. Both Mayor Brad West, the Port Coquitlam City Council, and the Coquitlam City Council have voiced support for the extension. However, as of 2022, no funding had been secured nor a formal plan created.

Port Coquitlam Station is located centrally on the southside of the CPKC Railyard and provides commuter rail service westbound to downtown Vancouver in the mornings, and eastbound to Maple Ridge, Pitt Meadows and Mission in the evenings.

The Lougheed Highway passes through Port Coquitlam, running from Coquitlam in the west to the Pitt River Bridge in the east. Although this highway has made much of Port Coquitlam a very congested area, it is one of the few major arterial highways in the area.

The Mary Hill Bypass, officially known as Highway 7B, runs adjacent to the Fraser River from the Pitt River Bridge on the east to the Port Mann Bridge on the west.

The Canadian Pacific Kansas City railway has a major rail yard in the central sector of the city.

In October 2009, the new Pitt River Bridge, a new seven-lane cable-stayed bridge, opened to the public replacing the existing crossing. The previous crossing was made up of 2 swing bridges, which were removed upon completion of the new bridge. The Pitt River Bridge crosses the Pitt River, connecting Port Coquitlam to neighbouring Pitt Meadows.

In March 2010, the Coast Meridian Overpass, a new four-lane cable-stayed bridge, opened to give a new option for traveling north to south over the Canadian Pacific Railway Oxford Street rail yard.

A 25.3 km (15.7 mi) hiking and biking trail, known as the Traboulay PoCo Trail, completely surrounds the city.

In August 2018, U-bicycle launched a dockless bicycle sharing system in the city.

== Education ==
=== Public schools ===
Public schools in Port Coquitlam are part of School District 43 Coquitlam and consists of several private schools as well.

Secondary schools:

- Riverside Secondary
- Terry Fox Secondary

Middle schools:

- École Citadel Middle
- Kwayhquitlum Middle
- Maple Creek Middle (former Hastings Junior Secondary)
- Minnekhada Middle (former George Pearkes Junior Secondary)
- Pitt River Middle (former Mary Hill Junior Secondary)

Elementary schools:

- Birchland Elementary
- Blakeburn Elementary
- Castle Park Elementar
- Cedar Drive Elementary
- Central Elementary
- Coquitlam River Elementary
- Glen Elementary (French Immersion)
- Irvine Elementary (French Immersion)
- James Park Elementary
- Hazel Trembath Elementary
- Kilmer Elementary (French Immersion)
- Lincoln Elementary (Closed in 2007).
- Mary Hill Elementary (French Immersion)
- Westwood Elementary

The Conseil scolaire francophone de la Colombie-Britannique operates one Francophone primary and secondary school: école des Pionniers-de-Maillardville.

=== Private schools ===
- Archbishop Carney Regional Secondary School
- Our Lady of the Assumption Elementary
- British Columbia Christian Academy (formerly Lincoln Elementary)
- Hope Lutheran Christian School
- Ecole des Pionniers de Maillardville (French)
- Sprott Shaw College (post secondary)

== Notable residents ==
- Rene Tosoni, former Major League Baseball player for the Minnesota Twins
- Sukh Chungh, Canadian football player
- Zach Hamill, professional hockey player, drafted 8th overall in the 2007 NHL entry draft by the Boston Bruins
- Betty Fox, cancer research activist, mother of Terry Fox
- Terry Fox, athlete and cancer treatment activist
- Robert Pickton, convicted serial killer, alleged to be Canada's most prolific
- Ian Tracey, Leo and Gemini Award-winning actor
- Amanda Todd, bullying victim
- Tyler Shaw, singer and songwriter
- Eric Reprid, Asian-Canadian rapper-songwriter
- Sophia Reid-Gantzert, actress and dancer

== See also ==
- Province of British Columbia
- Metro Vancouver Regional District
- School District 43 Coquitlam
- Tri-Cities (British Columbia)
