= Coquitlam River =

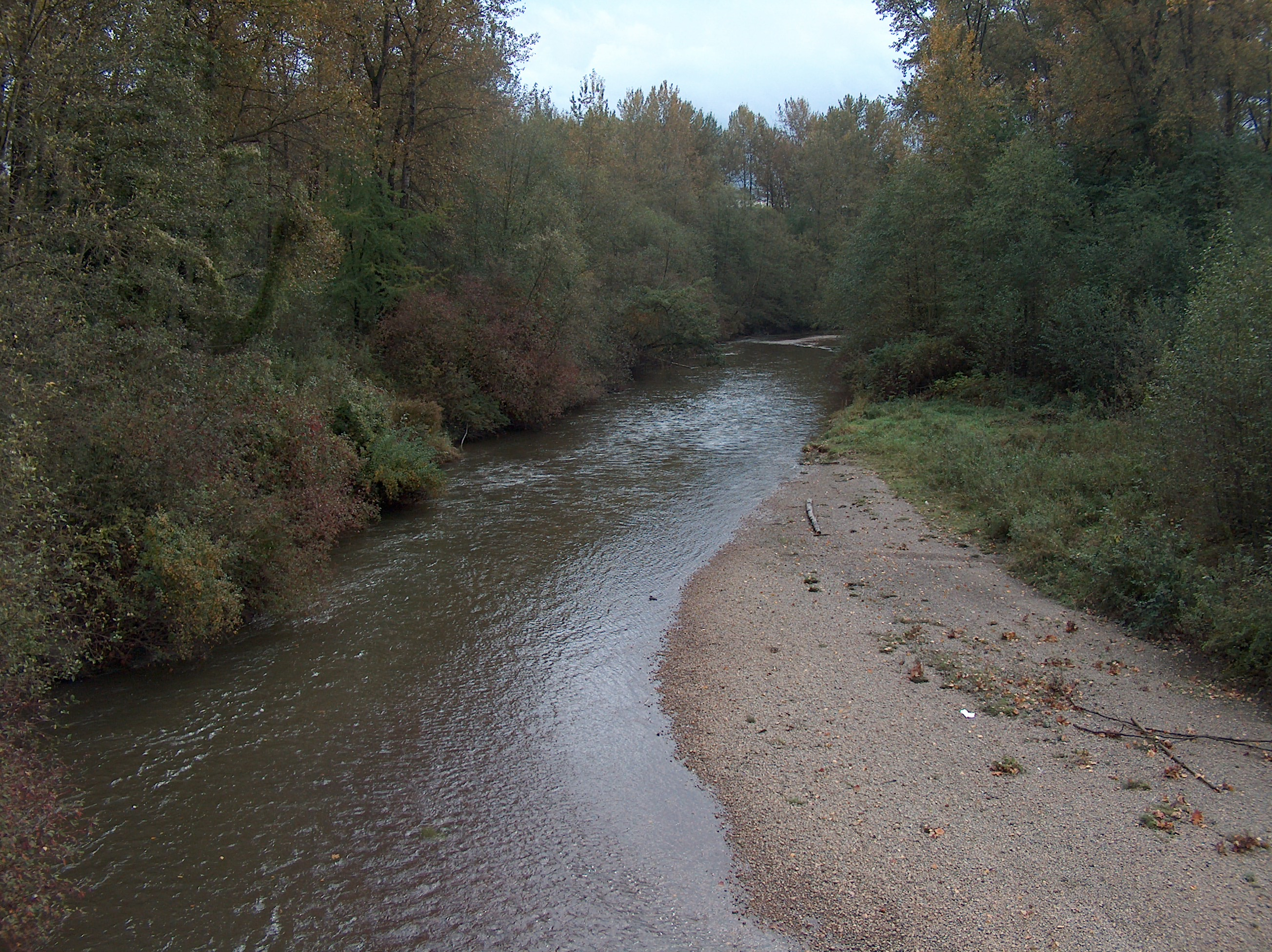

Location
- Country: Canada
- Province: British Columbia
- District: New Westminster Land District

Physical characteristics
- Source
  - coordinates: 49°33′13″N 122°45′59″W
  - elevation: 1,034 m (3,392 ft)
- Mouth: Fraser River
  - location: Port Coquitlam, Metro Vancouver
  - coordinates: 49°13′30″N 122°48′18″W
  - elevation: 4 m (13 ft)
- Discharge
  - location: Port Coquitlam
  - average: 6.04 m^{3}/s (213 cu ft/s)
  - minimum: 0.025 m^{3}/s (0.88 cu ft/s)
  - maximum: 476 m^{3}/s (16,800 cu ft/s)

The Coquitlam River (/koʊˈkwɪtləm/ or /kəˈkwɪtləm/) is a tributary of the Fraser River in the Canadian province of British Columbia. The river's name comes from the word Kʷikʷəƛ̓əm which translates to "Red fish up the river". The name is a reference to a sockeye salmon species that once occupied the river's waters.

The river is an 18 km meandering river with 30 tributaries and various morphological features. Owing to the size and area of its location, the river has a history of disastrous floods.

The Kwikwetlem first nations were the first humans to live in the area, followed by settlers thousands of years later. After settlers arrived the river would soon be altered many times for the resources it holds. The most recent changes are the generation of hydro-electricity with a dam.

The river's long history and importance have led to conservation efforts by different organizations for some of the various mammals, birds, fish, and plants. Some attempts have been made to rejuvenate the salmonid species with hatcheries and direct human intervention to assist wild salmonids. The area is also known to have some species which are included on the BC Species at Risk Act and The Committee on the Status of Endangered Wildlife in Canada (COSEWIC) lists.

== Setting ==
The Coquitlam River is located within the Coquitlam River Watershed, which has a total area of 340 km^{2} and formed during the last glacial advance. The watershed is split into two sections, the upper and lower Coquitlam River Watershed. Its source is Disappointment Lake, which is in the Coast Mountains near Indian Arm. It flows south into Coquitlam Lake, a reservoir behind the Coquitlam Dam. The Coquitlam River then continues past the dam flowing south until it reaches the Fraser River at the border between Coquitlam and Port Coquitlam.

The Coquitlam River spans a total of 18 km from the dam to its outlet and receives sediment and water from 30 tributaries. It is a meandering river with various features such as large boulders, riffles, undercut banks, sidebars, islands, oxbow lakes, large woody debris and small woody debris. The sediment that is carried in the river is composed of glacial sands, gravel, clays, silts and some boulders. The primary source of this sediment is Or Creek which supplies large amounts of cobbles, sand and silts. The Coquitlam River is also located in a coastal western hemlock biogeoclimatic zone.

This climatic zone and its position on a mountain means that it has a mean annual precipitation of 3498 mm. The mean daily discharge is roughly 14.35 m^{3}/s, however due to the high annual precipitation, the discharge can regularly increase to anywhere between 20 m^{3}/s and 50 m^{3}/s. These high discharge events have been known to last a couple days following larger precipitation events. The river also has a long history of flooding with the largest known flood on record occurring in 1921. This flood resulted in a discharge of 665 m^{3}/s and the second largest flood occurred in 1961 with a discharge of 476 m^{3}/s.

== Ecology ==
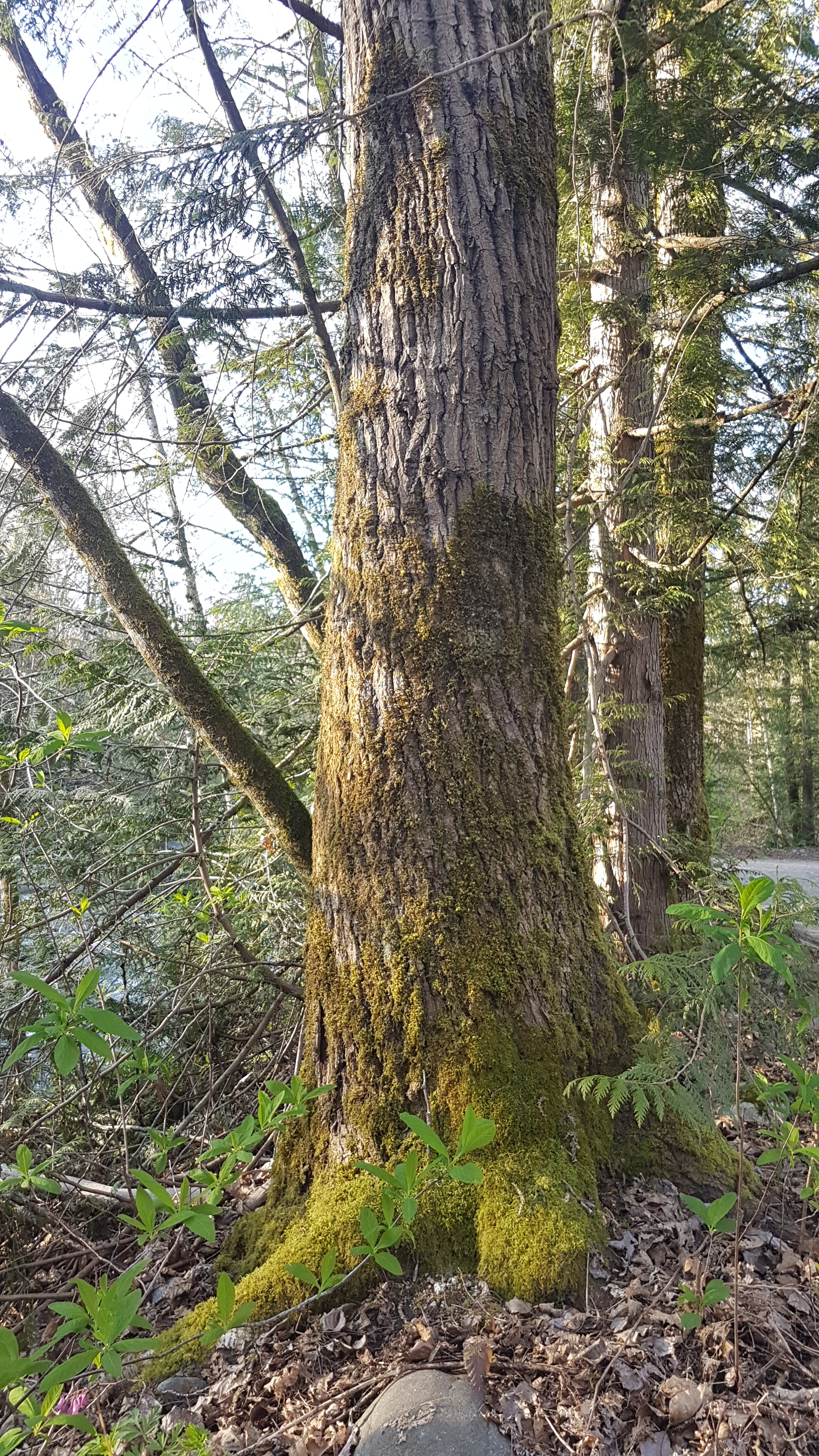
Example of riparian vegetation along Coquitlam River, species shown is Black Cottonwood.

The Coquitlam River is a part of the Fraser Lowland ecosection and Coastal Western Hemlock biogeoclimatic zone. The undeveloped land surrounding the river includes an oxbow lake, wetlands, and side channels. This riparian habitat includes a variety of vegetation from evergreens such as western red cedars to deciduous black cottonwoods. This forested area provides cover for animals such as black-tailed deer and racoons within the urban landscape in the lower reaches of the river. The river and its tributaries are home to 24 different species of fish, 5 of these salmonids. These salmon are a critical part of this ecosystem, providing a source of food for species such as black bears and bald eagles. After spawning, the fish carcasses decompose on banks and release nutrients in the soil for vegetation such as salmonberries.

=== Species ===
Species status's are classified under the BC's conservation ranks. Red list: "Any species or ecosystem that is at risk of being lost (extirpated, endangered or threatened)". Blue list: "Any species or ecosystem that is of special concern". Yellow list: "Any species or ecosystem that is at the least risk of being lost".

The following lists are not exhaustive, and were created using personal observations as well as observations from previous habitat assessments and reports of the area.

==== Mammals ====
Name	Species	Status
American black bear	Ursus americanus	Yellow
Black-tailed/mule deer	Odocoileus hemionus	Yellow
Coyote	Canis latrans	Yellow
Racoon	Procyon lotor	Yellow
American beaver	Castor canadensis	Yellow
Muskrat	Ondatra zibethicus	Yellow
American mink	Neogale vison	Yellow

==== Amphibians ====
Name	Species	Status
Northern red-legged frog	Rana aurora	Blue

==== Birds ====
Name	Species	Status
Great blue heron	Ardea herodias	Blue
Bald eagle	Haliaeetus leucocephalus	Yellow
Red-tailed hawk	Buteo jamaicensis	Yellow
Wood duck	Aix sponsa	Yellow
Canada geese	Branta canadensis	Yellow
Merganser	Mergus merganser	Yellow
Black-capped chickadees	Poecile atricapillus	Yellow
Belted kingfisher	Megaceryle alcyon	Yellow
Spotted towhee	Pipilo maculatus	Yellow
Mallard duck	Anas platyrhynchos	Yellow
Varied thrush	Ixoreus naevius	Yellow
Winter wren	Troglodytes hiemalis	Blue

==== Fish ====
Name	Species	Status
Chinook salmon	Oncorhynchus tshawytscha	No Status
Pink salmon	Oncorhynchus gorbuscha	No Status
Steelhead trout	Oncorhynchus mykiss	No Status
Chum salmon	Oncorhynchus keta	No Status
Coho salmon	Oncorhynchus kisutch	No Status
Long-nosed dace	Rhinichthys cataractae	Yellow
Coastrange sculpin	Cottus aleuticus	Yellow
Prickly sculpin	Cottus asper	Yellow
Three-spined stickleback	Gasterosteus aculeatus	Yellow
Red-sided shiner	Richardsonius balteatus	Yellow
Northern squawfish	Ptychocheilus oregonensis	Yellow
Black crappie	Pomoxis nigromaculatus	Exotic
Pacific lamprey	Entosphenus tridentatus	Yellow

==== Vegetation ====
Name	Species	Status
Black cottonwood	Populus trichocarpa	Yellow
Red alder	Alnus rubra	Yellow
Pacific willow	Salix lasiandra var. lasiandra	Yellow
Vine maple	Acer circinatum	Yellow
Salmonberry	Rubus spectabilis	Yellow
Skunk cabbage	Lysichiton americanus	Yellow
Pacific ninebark	Physocarpus capitatus	Yellow
Western hemlock	Tsuga heterophylla	Yellow
Pacific silver fir	Abies amabilis	Yellow
Western red cedar	Thuja plicata	Yellow
Douglas fir	Pseudotsuga menziesii	Yellow
Himalayan blackberry	Rubus armeniacus	Exotic
Sword fern	Polystichum munitum	Yellow
Licorice fern	Polypodium glycyrrhiza	Yellow
English holly	Ilex aquifolium	Exotic
False lily-of-the-valley	Maianthemum dilatatum	Yellow
Red huckleberry	Vaccinium parvifolium	Yellow
Robert's geranium	Geranium robertianum	Exotic

== Human use and impacts ==
=== Historic ===
The Coquitlam River is named for the Kwikwetlem First Nations (kʷikʷəƛ̓əm) who have lived in the region for at least the last nine thousand years. kʷikʷəƛ̓əm translates to "Red fish up the river" in reference to an early sockeye salmon species that once spawned in Coquitlam Lake. The Kwikwetlem were renowned for their canoe and paddle craftsmanship. The Kwikwetlem lived throughout the Coquitlam River watershed and would have relied on fishing, gathering, and trade with other First Nations living along the Fraser River.

European settlers first arrived in the region in the mid-1800s and began using the river for their own purposes. The first dam was built at the mouth of Coquitlam Lake in 1892 to provide a source of drinking water for the growing colony of New Westminster. In 1905 the Vancouver Power Company completed construction on a second dam and a tunnel to nearby Buntzen Lake for power generation. As a result, a large portion of the Coquitlam River's flow was diverted out of the watershed altering the hydrology of the river. In response to increased demand, another larger dam was completed in 1915, however unlike previous dams, fish access to the lake was completely blocked. further impacting the river's ecology.

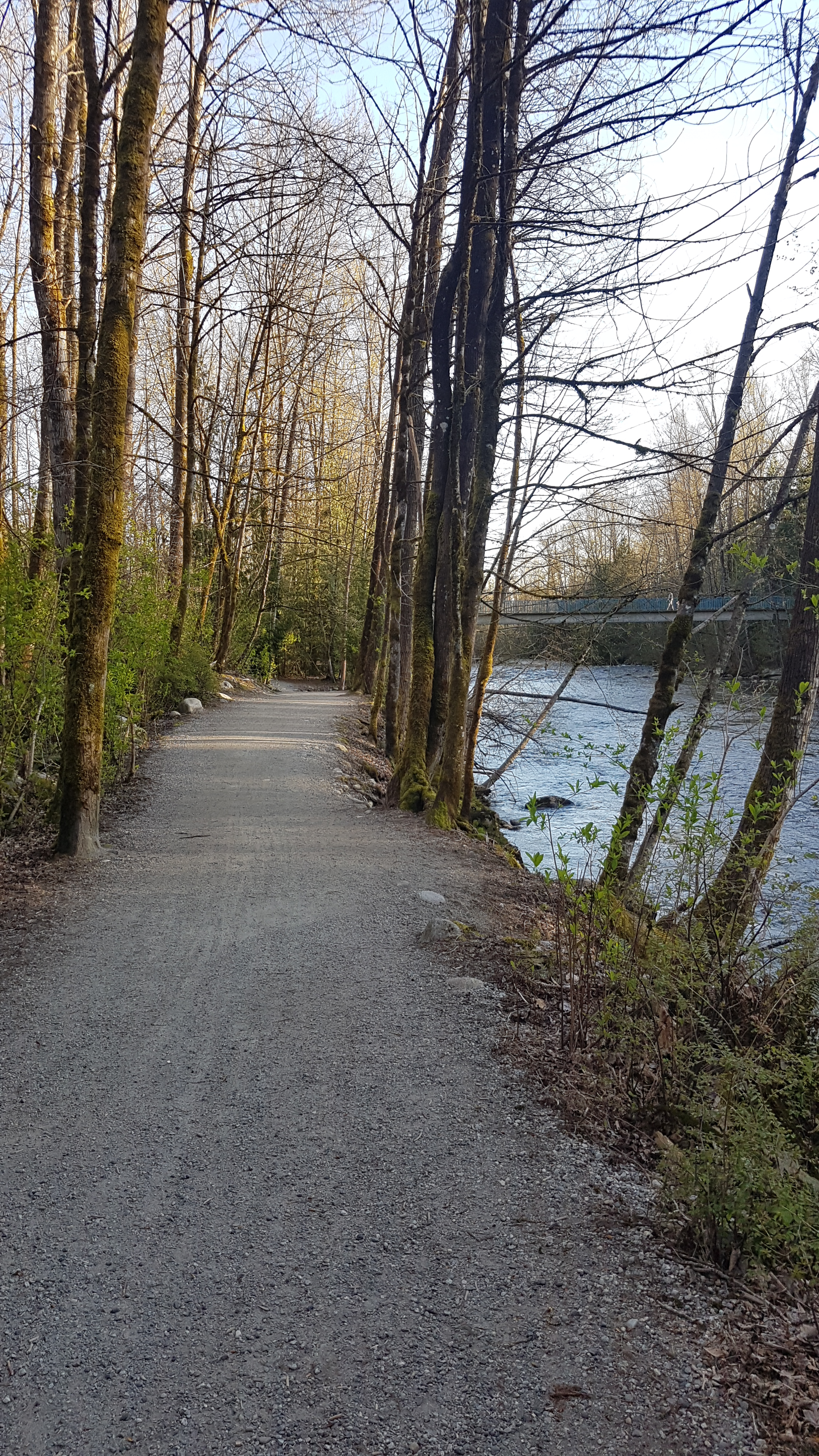
One of the many recreational trails along to the Coquitlam River

The watershed was logged extensively throughout the 1900s which has resulted in heavy sediment loads to occur during high precipitation events. Throughout the 1950s and 60s it was also common practice to extract gravel directly from the stream bed, although this stopped in 1965 when the B.C. Gravel Removal Order was passed.

=== Modern ===
The Coquitlam Lake dam continues to provide power to the residents of Metro Vancouver and is owned and operated by the provincial energy authority, BC hydro. The lake is also one of three reservoirs used by Metro Vancouver and provides drinking water to 900,000 people.

The flow reduction caused by the dam and the water diversion to Buntzen Lake affects fish and wildlife in the river and surrounding riparian zone. The barrier created by the dam restricts migration between the upper and lower parts of the watershed, which impacts salmon species in particular who used the lake as a hatching site. As a result, sockeye salmon have become almost entirely extirpated in the Coquitlam River. The dam also reduces the accumulation of woody debris in the lower reaches of the river which could be used for habitats.

There are several popular parks and trails along the banks of the river including Coquitlam River Park, Lions Parks, and Gates Parks. The river is also popular with local fishermen.

== Conservation and threats ==
=== Conservation groups ===
There have been numerous initiatives to address and educate the public about the issues that threaten the Coquitlam River. These began in 1996 with the Coquitlam River Watershed Community Initiative, and continue today with others, such as the Coquitlam River Watershed Society established in 1998.

=== Salmon ===
To rejuvenate the salmonid species in the river, the Port Coquitlam & District Hunting and Fishing Club has operated the Grist Goeson Memorial Hatchery through the Department of Fisheries and Oceans (DFO) Salmonid Enhancement Program (SEP). At the hatchery, tens of thousands of juvenile fish are released each spring. These efforts has led to a rebound in coho, chum and pink salmon populations, with approximately 4 times the amount of salmon returning compared to their lowest numbers. However, other species such as sockeye salmon and steelhead trout are either not returning at all or in very low numbers. This is likely due to long-lasting impacts from the Coquitlam Lake dam, logging upstream, and gravel removal.

Since the dam's installation, salmon have been cut off from the valuable rearing habitat of the upper Coquitlam River. To attempt to reverse this, Fisheries and Oceans Canada plan to transport up to 100 returning coho salmon. This plan was presented in 2020 and will likely occur over a 5-year trial period. This transportation will also be managed by the Grist Goeson Memorial Hatchery.

=== Threatened species management ===
There is a protected Wildlife Management Area found on the north side of the Coquitlam and Fraser Rivers confluence. This land is managed by the BC's Ministry of Forests, Lands, Natural Resources Operations and Rural Developments (FLNRORD). The great blue herons found on this reserve are blue-listed species under the BC Species at Risk Act (SARA) and are listed as a "special concern" under COSEWIC.

In 2014, a Species at Risk project was completed and both the great blue heron as well as the blue-listed red-legged frog were identified along the Coquitlam River. Red-legged frogs were observed in the upper reaches, however possible breeding habitat was also identified and recommended as a viable location for restoration. Due to the sensitive nature of this amphibian, it was also recommended to avoid pond draining and ditch cleaning during breeding times.

== See also ==
- List of rivers of British Columbia
- List of tributaries of the Fraser River
