= Widgeon Lake =

- Location within British Columbia
- Location: British Columbia, Canada
- Coordinates: 49.448°N 122.669°W
- Type: lake

Widgeon Lake is a lake in British Columbia, Canada in Pinecone Burke Provincial Park. The area includes a trail that is roughly 25 km long and a stunning glacial lake at the end. The lake is used mainly for hiking, trail running, camping, and canoeing.

== See also ==
- List of lakes of British Columbia
