= Pitt Lake =

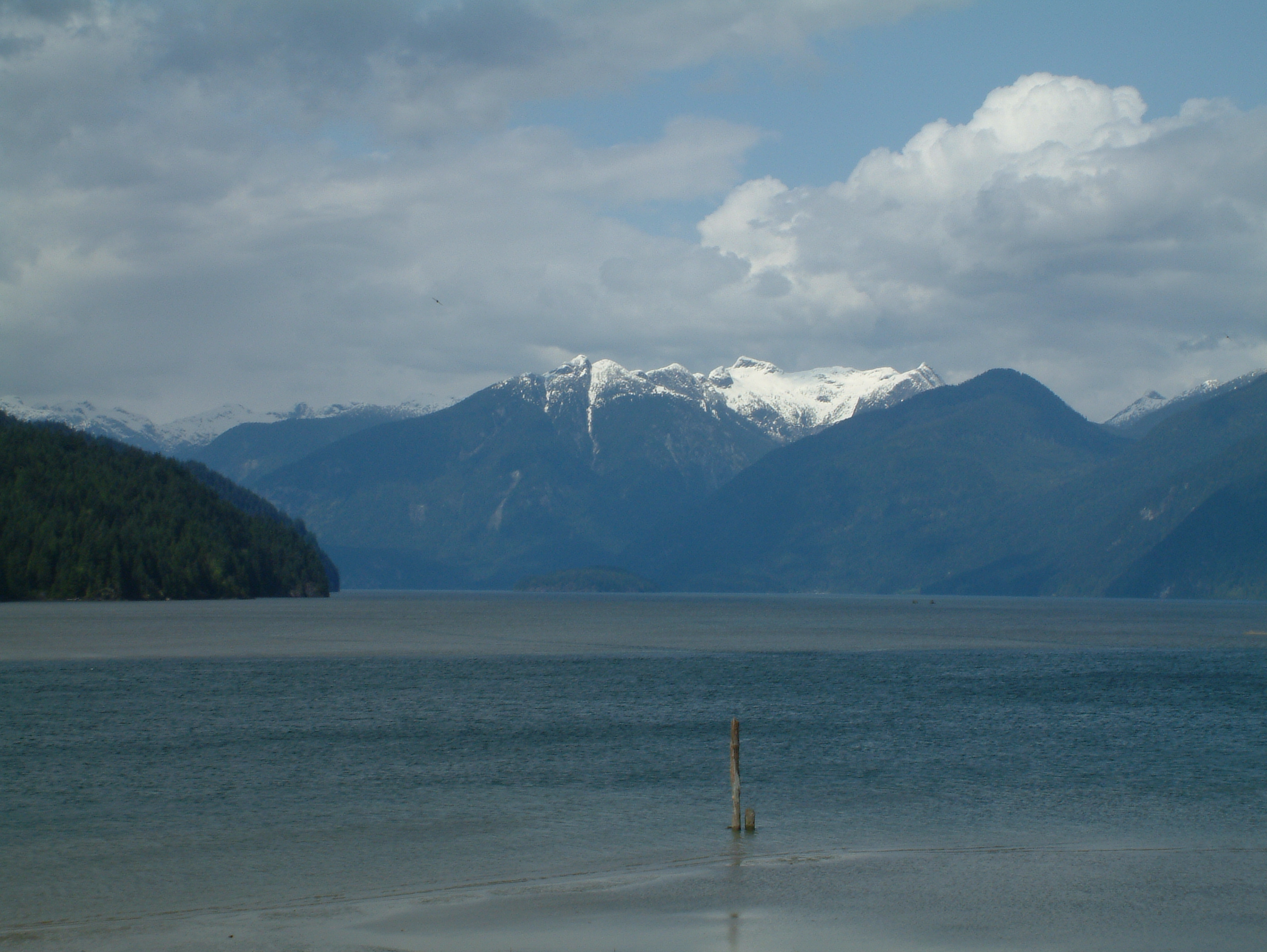

- Location within British Columbia
- Location: British Columbia
- Coordinates: 49°25′N 122°33′W
- Type: Fjord lake and Tidal lake
- Primary inflows: Pitt River
- Primary outflows: Pitt River
- Basin countries: Canada
- Max. length: 24 km (15 mi)
- Max. width: 4.5 km (2.8 mi)
- Surface area: 53.5 km^{2} (20.7 sq mi)
- Max. depth: 150 m (490 ft)
- Surface elevation: 3 m (9.8 ft)
- Islands: Goose, Little Goose, Gosling

Pitt Lake is the second-largest lake in the Lower Mainland of British Columbia. About 53.5 km^{2} (20.7 sq mi) in area, it is about 25 km (16 mi) long and about 4.5 km (2.8 mi) wide at its widest. It is one of the world's relatively few tidal lakes, and among the largest. In Pitt Lake, there is on average a three-foot tide range; thus Pitt Lake is separated from sea level and tidal waters during most hours of each day during the 15 foot tide cycle of the Pitt River and Strait of Georgia estuary immediately downstream. The lake's southern tip is 20 km (12 mi) upstream from The Pitt River confluence with the Fraser River and is 40 km (25 mi) east of Downtown Vancouver.

== Geography ==
Pitt Lake is in a typical U-shaped glacial valley in the Pacific Ranges of the Coast Mountains. The overdeepening of the lower end of the valley over the span of the Wisconsin glaciation created a trough over 140 m below current sea level. After initial glacial retreat at around 13,000 years ago a saltwater fjord occupied this basin when relative sea levels were still ca 120 to 140m above current levels in the region. Unlike neighbouring Indian Arm and Howe Sound farther west, this fjord basin became partly cut off from tidal waters by sedimentation of the lower Fraser River ca 10,500 years ago, and Pitt Lake is now considered a tidal fjord lake.

Pitt Lake is the second largest of a series of north–south oriented fjord-lakes incising the southern slopes of the Pacific Ranges, the largest being Harrison Lake located 60 km (37 mi) to the east. The other fjord-lakes include Coquitlam Lake, Alouette Lake, Stave Lake, and Chehalis Lake.

The Pitt River drains into the northern end of Pitt Lake. The western shore of Pitt Lake are protected within Pinecone Burke Provincial Park, while most of the eastern shore are protected within Golden Ears Provincial Park. The southern end of Pitt Lake features an extensive marshland called Pitt Polder. While most of this marshland has since been drained for agricultural use, the northernmost portion is strictly protected in order to provide critical habitat for migratory birds.

=== Communities ===
The community of Pitt Meadows and the Katzie First Nations reserve of Pitt Lake Indian Reserve 4 are located at the southern end of the lake. Just southwest of the lake is the community of Port Coquitlam, which is across the Pitt River from Pitt Meadows. At the north end of the lake is a locality named Alvin, which is a transport and shipping point for logging companies and their employees.

== Climate ==
Pitt Lake has an oceanic climate (Köppen climate type Cfb). As such, it features cool, rainy winters with relatively warm and dry summers. The average annual precipitation is 2,155.4 mm (84.86 in). Extremes vary from −23.3 °C (−9.9 °F), recorded on January 23, 1969, to 37.0 °C (98.6 °F), recorded on July 21, 2006.

Climate data for Pitt Lake (Pitt Polder) (Elevation: 5m) 1981−2010
Month	Jan	Feb	Mar	Apr	May	Jun	Jul	Aug	Sep	Oct	Nov	Dec	Year
Record high °C (°F)	15.0 (59.0)	18.3 (64.9)	25.0 (77.0)	29.0 (84.2)	35.0 (95.0)	36.0 (96.8)	37.0 (98.6)	35.5 (95.9)	35.5 (95.9)	28.0 (82.4)	19.4 (66.9)	17.0 (62.6)	37.0 (98.6)
Mean daily maximum °C (°F)	5.8 (42.4)	7.9 (46.2)	10.9 (51.6)	14.2 (57.6)	17.8 (64.0)	20.6 (69.1)	23.8 (74.8)	24.2 (75.6)	20.8 (69.4)	14.2 (57.6)	8.5 (47.3)	5.3 (41.5)	14.5 (58.1)
Daily mean °C (°F)	3.1 (37.6)	4.1 (39.4)	6.7 (44.1)	9.4 (48.9)	12.8 (55.0)	15.6 (60.1)	18.0 (64.4)	18.1 (64.6)	14.8 (58.6)	9.9 (49.8)	5.4 (41.7)	2.5 (36.5)	10.0 (50.0)
Mean daily minimum °C (°F)	0.3 (32.5)	0.2 (32.4)	2.3 (36.1)	4.6 (40.3)	7.8 (46.0)	10.6 (51.1)	12.1 (53.8)	11.9 (53.4)	8.7 (47.7)	5.5 (41.9)	2.3 (36.1)	−0.4 (31.3)	5.5 (41.9)
Record low °C (°F)	−23.3 (−9.9)	−16.7 (1.9)	−11.7 (10.9)	−5.0 (23.0)	−2.2 (28.0)	1.7 (35.1)	4.4 (39.9)	2.8 (37.0)	−1.7 (28.9)	−9.0 (15.8)	−19.0 (−2.2)	−18.0 (−0.4)	−23.3 (−9.9)
Average precipitation mm (inches)	298.6 (11.76)	203.0 (7.99)	199.4 (7.85)	164.5 (6.48)	135.6 (5.34)	100.6 (3.96)	69.1 (2.72)	65.9 (2.59)	98.6 (3.88)	223.0 (8.78)	340.2 (13.39)	257.0 (10.12)	2,155.4 (84.86)
Average rainfall mm (inches)	284.4 (11.20)	194.1 (7.64)	197.0 (7.76)	164.5 (6.48)	135.6 (5.34)	100.6 (3.96)	69.1 (2.72)	65.9 (2.59)	98.6 (3.88)	222.8 (8.77)	336.1 (13.23)	243.6 (9.59)	2,112.4 (83.17)
Average snowfall cm (inches)	14.2 (5.6)	8.8 (3.5)	2.4 (0.9)	0.0 (0.0)	0.0 (0.0)	0.0 (0.0)	0.0 (0.0)	0.0 (0.0)	0.0 (0.0)	0.2 (0.1)	4.1 (1.6)	13.3 (5.2)	43.0 (16.9)
Average precipitation days (≥ 0.2 mm)	20.2	15.8	18.9	17.1	15.5	14	8.5	7.5	9.7	17	20.8	19	184
Average rainy days (≥ 0.2 mm)	19.3	15	18.7	17.1	15.5	14	8.5	7.5	9.7	17	20.7	17.7	180.7
Average snowy days (≥ 0.2 cm)	2.6	1.7	0.72	0.0	0.0	0.0	0.0	0.0	0.0	0.04	0.83	3	8.89
Source: Environment Canada (normals, 1981−2010)

== Recreation ==
The lake is popular with boaters and canoeists, but is prone to heavy winds and rains as well as big waves (due to its great depth). The Upper Pitt, meaning the valley upstream from the lake, is considered one of BC's best fly-fishing rivers and one of its best steelhead streams.

In addition, there is a destination golfing resort in the Pitt Polder area called Swan-e-set.

== Folklore ==
The area along the east side of the lake is somewhat notorious for being the reputed location of Slumach's lost gold mine, the location of many failed and sometimes disastrous searches for the alleged murderer's lost gold mine. Local historian Bill Barlee has said "that this highly colourful and interesting tale, accepted as fact by a host of treasure seekers, probably does not exist." According to Barlee by the geological information available it would appear unlikely that a gold deposit would be found in the region of Pitt Lake. Historian Garnet Basque states that geologists are convinced that the region around Pitt Lake is not gold bearing.

== See also ==
- List of lakes of British Columbia
