= Pitt River =

River in British Columbia, Canada

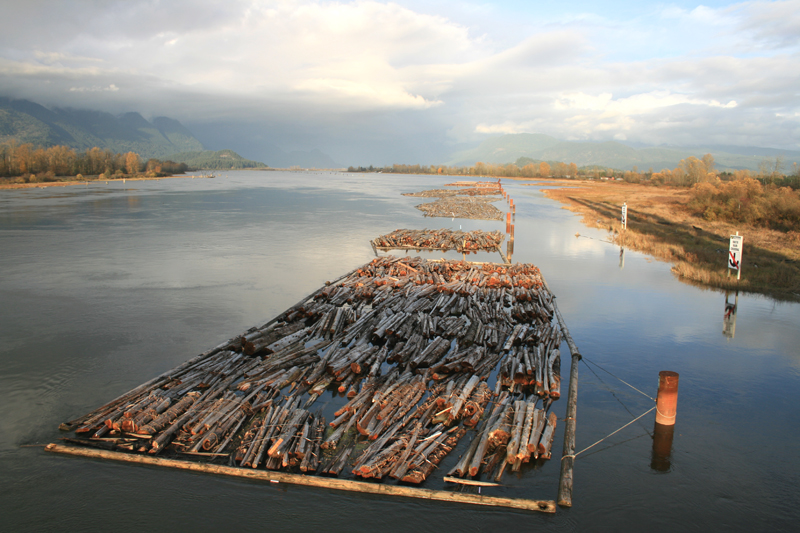
- Pitt River, looking north from the Lougheed highway bridge in Port Coquitlam

Location
- Country: Canada
- Province: British Columbia
- District: New Westminster Land District

Physical characteristics
- Source: Garibaldi Ranges
  - location: Coast Mountains
- Mouth: Fraser River
  - location: Pitt Meadows, Port Coquitlam, Greater Vancouver Regional District
  - coordinates: 49°13′43″N 122°46′4″W
  - elevation: 5 m (16 ft)
- Discharge
  - location: Alvin
  - average: 54.0 m^{3}/s (1,910 cu ft/s)
  - minimum: 5.10 m^{3}/s (180 cu ft/s)
  - maximum: 597 m^{3}/s (21,100 cu ft/s)

Basin features
- Tributaries
  - left: Alouette River

The Pitt River in British Columbia, Canada is a large tributary of the Fraser River, entering it a few miles upstream from New Westminster and about 25 km ESE of Downtown Vancouver. The river, which begins in the Garibaldi Ranges of the Coast Mountains, is in two sections above and below Pitt Lake and flows on a generally southernly course. Pitt Lake and the lower Pitt River are tidal in nature as the Fraser's mouth is only a few miles downstream from their confluence.

The river was named for William Pitt the Younger. The first mention of the name, as "Pitts River", occurs in the 1827 journal kept by James McMillan of the Hudson's Bay Company. The river has an alternate name, Quoitle, which is probably equivalent to Kwantlen.

East of the lower Pitt River, 20 km long, is the community of Pitt Meadows, while to its west are the cities of Coquitlam and Port Coquitlam; opposite its mouth is Surrey. Port Coquitlam and Pitt Meadows are connected by the Highway 7 bridges and the rail trestles of the double-tracked CPR mainline, whose vast main western yards begin on the Pitt's western shore. The plain of the lower Pitt was berry marsh and bog prior to its dyking. The farmland is on the east bank in Pitt Meadows; the poorer soil quality and scrubland on the west shore has encouraged large scale suburbanization in Port Coquitlam. On the west shore in the upper stretches of the lower Pitt is Minnekhada Regional Park, residence of former British Columbia lieutenant-governor Clarence Wallace. It was later sold to the Daon Corporation, which sold off portions. The province then bought it, anticipating future development in the area; future provincial governments sold off even more portions.

The upper Pitt's basin is short but fed by a number of ice fields, glaciers, and mountain streams, such as Garibaldi Névé and Mamquam Icefield. Thus the river gets quite large only 50 km from its source in Garibaldi Provincial Park. East of the upper Pitt is Golden Ears Provincial Park (formerly a part of Garibaldi Provincial Park). Barge traffic from logging camps in the upper Pitt basin is a regular sight on the Pitt Lake as well as in the area of the two highway bridges and CPR mainline bridge just up from the confluence of the Fraser.

The Pitt is one of a number of north-south river-lake valleys which join the lower Fraser along its north side. The others are the valleys of the Coquitlam River, the Alouette River, the Stave River, Suicide Creek (Norrish Creek), the Chehalis River and, lastly, the valley of Harrison Lake, 60 km east of the Pitt.

== See also ==
- List of rivers of British Columbia
- List of tributaries of the Fraser River
- Pitt River Bridge
