= Coquitlam Lake =

- Location within British Columbia
- Location: North of Coquitlam, British Columbia
- Coordinates: 49°24′N 122°47′W
- Type: Reservoir
- Primary inflows: Coquitlam River
- Primary outflows: Coquitlam River
- Basin countries: Canada
- Surface area: 11 km^{2} (4.2 sq mi)
- Surface elevation: 154 m (505 ft)
- Islands: Coquitlam Island

Coquitlam Lake is a reservoir located just north of Coquitlam, British Columbia. It is one of the three main water sources for Metro Vancouver, and part of the Coquitlam watershed. It is also a part of BC Hydro's power generation system. A tunnel directs water from the lake to nearby Buntzen Lake, and from there to a pair of power stations.

== History ==
Construction of the tunnel between Coquitlam Lake and Buntzen Lake began in 1902 and finished in 1905, supplying water to powerhouses on Indian Arm, which supplied electricity to Vancouver.

The first Coquitlam Dam, built to raise the water level by 5 feet (1.52 m), was begun in April 1904 and completed in 1905. It was built to protect the water supply to the powerhouses, and also supplied water to New Westminster. By 1906 the original dam was discovered to be leaking, and while repairs were made the leak continued through 1908, until the current dam was completed in 1914.

There is a glacier in the watershed of the reservoir, Coquitlam Glacier, which is the only glacier in Metro Vancouver. It formed during the Little Ice Age and is shrinking as the last Ice Age ends and, potentially, due to the effects of climate change. It is expected to melt by 2050.

== Climate ==
Climate data for Coquitlam Lake
Month	Jan	Feb	Mar	Apr	May	Jun	Jul	Aug	Sep	Oct	Nov	Dec	Year
Record high °C (°F)	13.3 (55.9)	14.4 (57.9)	21.1 (70.0)	26.1 (79.0)	32.8 (91.0)	33.3 (91.9)	36.7 (98.1)	34.4 (93.9)	31.7 (89.1)	25.0 (77.0)	18.9 (66.0)	13.3 (55.9)	36.7 (98.1)
Mean daily maximum °C (°F)	2.7 (36.9)	5.1 (41.2)	7.1 (44.8)	11.5 (52.7)	15.9 (60.6)	18.5 (65.3)	22.0 (71.6)	21.3 (70.3)	18.1 (64.6)	12.7 (54.9)	7.1 (44.8)	4.3 (39.7)	12.2 (54.0)
Daily mean °C (°F)	0.6 (33.1)	2.5 (36.5)	3.7 (38.7)	7.0 (44.6)	10.9 (51.6)	13.7 (56.7)	16.6 (61.9)	16.3 (61.3)	13.6 (56.5)	9.2 (48.6)	4.5 (40.1)	2.2 (36.0)	8.4 (47.1)
Mean daily minimum °C (°F)	−1.5 (29.3)	−0.1 (31.8)	0.3 (32.5)	2.6 (36.7)	5.9 (42.6)	8.9 (48.0)	11.1 (52.0)	11.2 (52.2)	9.0 (48.2)	5.6 (42.1)	2.0 (35.6)	0.1 (32.2)	4.6 (40.3)
Record low °C (°F)	−21.1 (−6.0)	−16.7 (1.9)	−12.2 (10.0)	−5.6 (21.9)	−2.2 (28.0)	1.7 (35.1)	3.3 (37.9)	4.4 (39.9)	−0.6 (30.9)	−5.0 (23.0)	−17.8 (0.0)	−22.8 (−9.0)	−22.8 (−9.0)
Average precipitation mm (inches)	508.0 (20.00)	397.8 (15.66)	350.4 (13.80)	237.4 (9.35)	140.5 (5.53)	130.9 (5.15)	86.4 (3.40)	108.2 (4.26)	204.4 (8.05)	403.0 (15.87)	480.6 (18.92)	568.4 (22.38)	3,616 (142.37)
Average snowfall cm (inches)	62.6 (24.6)	23.2 (9.1)	15.9 (6.3)	1.0 (0.4)	0.0 (0.0)	0.0 (0.0)	0.0 (0.0)	0.0 (0.0)	0.0 (0.0)	0.0 (0.0)	6.3 (2.5)	39.2 (15.4)	148.2 (58.3)
Average precipitation days	21	18	19	17	13	13	8	11	13	19	21	22	195
Average snowy days	6	3	2	0	0	0	0	0	0	0	1	4	16
Source: Environment and Climate Change Canada

== See also ==
- List of lakes of British Columbia
