= List of tallest buildings in Coquitlam =

Skyline of Coquitlam
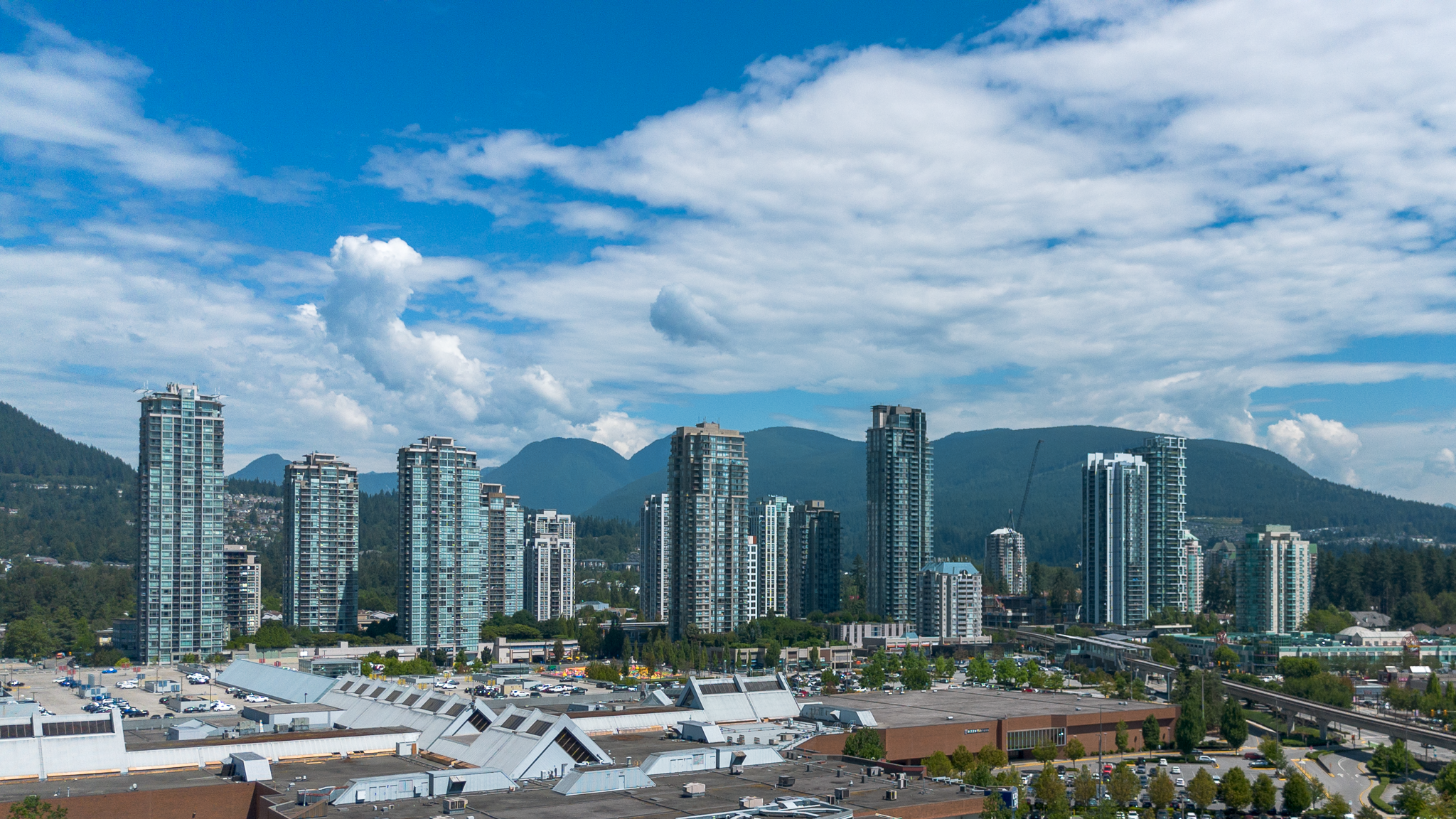
- Coquitlam Town Centre in 2025
- Tallest building: 567 Clarke + Como (2021)
- Tallest building height: 162.2 m (532 ft)
- Major clusters: Coquitlam Town Centre; Burquitlam
- First 150 m+ building: 567 Clarke + Como

Number of tall buildings (2026)
- Taller than 100 m (328 ft): 14
- Taller than 150 m (492 ft): 4

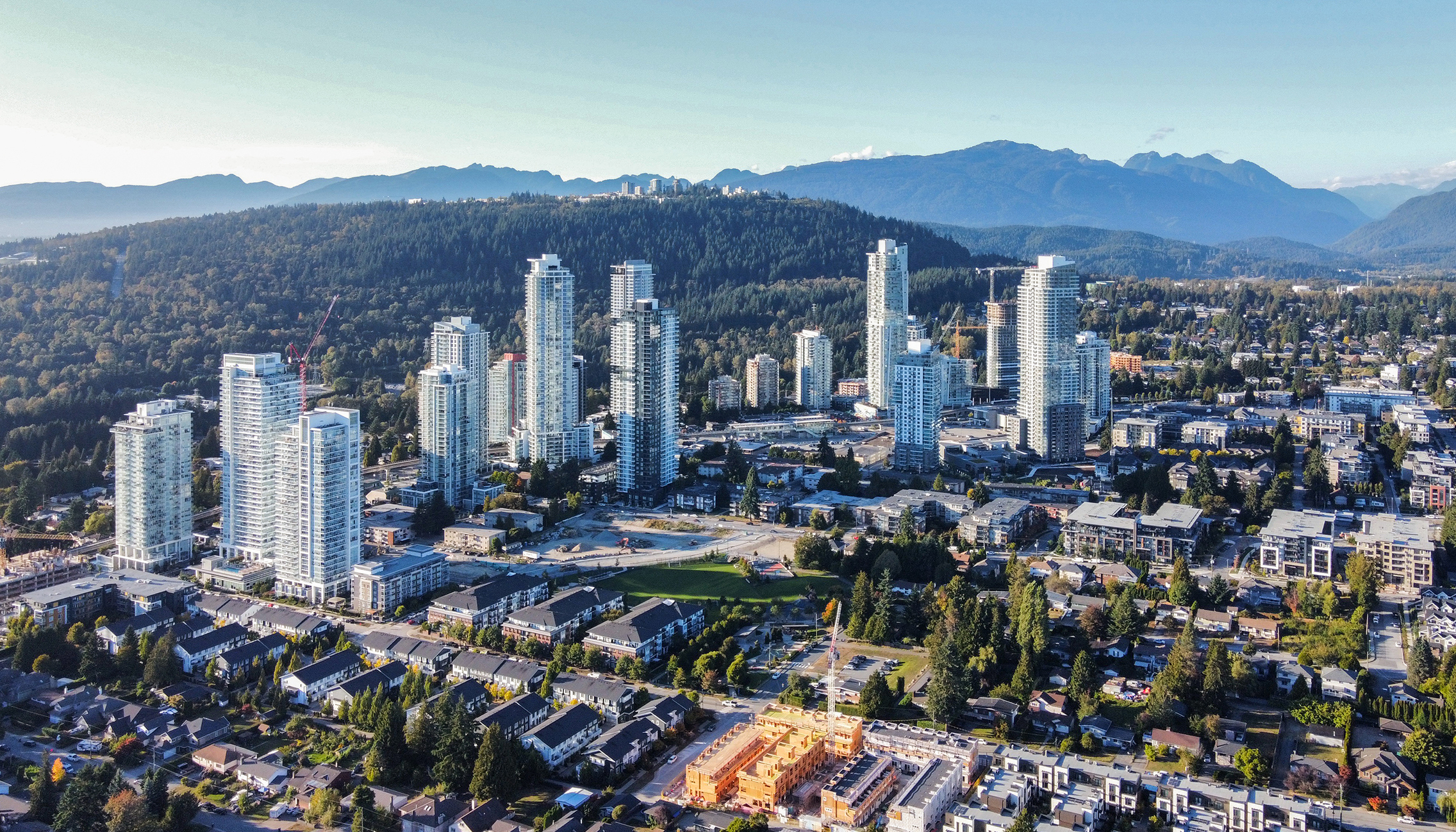
Burquitlam in 2025

Coquitlam is the fifth largest city in Greater Vancouver, in the Canadian province of British Columbia. Similarly to the Greater Vancouver municipalities of Burnaby and Surrey, Coquitlam has seen an influx of residential high-rises in the early 21st century. The city is home to 14 buildings over 100 metres (328 ft) tall, 4 of which are taller than 150 metres (492 ft) as of 2026. There are two primary concentrations of tall buildings in Coquitlam: one in Coquitlam Town Centre, and the other in Burquitlam, on the city's western border with Burnaby. The tallest building in Coquitlam is 567 Clarke + Como, a 162.2 m (532 ft), 49-storey residential skyscraper completed in Burquitlam in 2021.

Coquitlam Town Centre was first developed as the city's commercial centre in the 1970s, with the Coquitlam Centre shopping mall opening in 1979. The district has become home to numerous high-rise buildings since the 1990s, and contained the highest concentration of high-rise condominiums in the Tri-Cities by 2009. The 2000s saw an increase in the height of new towers, which started to reach over 100 m (328 ft) in height. The title of the tallest building in the city changed hands four times between 2008 and 2016. Recent development has been transit-oriented, spurred by the Evergreen Extension completed in 2016. Part of the Millennium Line of Greater Vancouver's SkyTrain system, the extension added the Coquitlam Central, Lincoln, and Lafarge Lake–Douglas stations, all in close proximity to the town centre.

The Evergreen Extension also connected Burquitlam to the SkyTrain system, via Burquitlam station. Since then, many high-rises have risen around the station, to the extent that Burquitlam's skyline is roughly equivalent in size to that of Coquitlam Town Centre. Burquitlam contains the five tallest buildings in Coquitlam. 567 Clarke + Como, which was the first building in Coquitlam to exceed 150 m (492 ft) in height, was later joined by Highpoint, Myriad by Concert, and Smith & Farrow I in 2025. Several towers directly south of Burquitlam form a continuous skyline with the high-rises of Lougheed, which is across the municipal border in Burnaby.

== History ==
Number of buildings by height in Coquitlam by the end of each year, based on the information in this article. Click on the legend to toggle a specific height on or off. View chart definition.

== Map of tallest buildings ==
The map below shows the location of every building taller than 100 m (328 ft) in Coquitlam. Each marker is numbered by the building's height rank, and coloured by the decade of its completion. The separate clusters of Coquitlam Town Centre (northeast of the map) and Burquitlam (southwest) are visible on the map.

Buildings taller than 100 m (328 ft) in Coquitlam.
- 2000s
- 2010s
- 2020s
1 567 Clarke + Como
2 Highpoint
3 Myriad by Concert
4 Smith & Farrow I
5 Jinju by Anthem
6 MThree
7 Sophora on the Park
8 Meridian
9 Lougheed Heights Tower 1
10 Oasis
11 1123 Westwood
12 Levo I
13 Obelisk
14 Hensley

== Tallest buildings ==
This list ranks completed buildings in Coquitlam that stand at least 100 m (328 ft) tall as of 2026, based on standard height measurement. This includes spires and architectural details but does not include antenna masts. The “Year” column indicates the year of completion. Buildings tied in height are sorted by year of completion with earlier buildings ranked first, and then alphabetically.

Was the tallest building in Coquitlam upon completion

Rank	Name	Image	Location	Height m (ft)	Floors	Year	Purpose	Notes
1	567 Clarke + Como		Burquitlam 49°15′45″N 122°53′23″W	162.2 (532)	49	2021	Residential	Tallest building in Burquitlam and in Coquitlam. First building in Coquitlam to exceed 150 metres (492 ft) in height. Developed by Marcon, which is also behind the Marcon Elmwood project.
2	Highpoint	–	Burquitlam 49°15′35″N 122°53′30″W	160.8 (528)	50	2025	Residential	Also marketed as Highpoint by Ledingham McAllister.
3	Myriad by Concert		Burquitlam 49°15′41″N 122°53′14″W	154.6 (507)	50	2025	Residential	Also known as Burquitlam Park 1.
4	Smith & Farrow I	–	Burquitlam 49°15′39″N 122°53′33″W	150 (492)	46	2025	Residential	
5	Jinju by Anthem	–	Burquitlam 49°15′33″N 122°53′24″W	130.6 (428)	42	2025	Residential	
6	MThree		Coquitlam Town Centre 49°16′55″N 122°47′38″W	129.8 (426)	48	2016	Residential	Tallest building in Coquitlam from 2016 to 2021.
7	Sophora on the Park	–	Coquitlam Town Centre 49°16′55″N 122°47′28″W	125.5 (412)	40	2023	Residential	
8	Meridian	–	Burquitlam 49°15′33″N 122°53′31″W	121.3 (398)	38	2024	Residential	
9	Lougheed Heights Tower 1	–	Burquitlam 49°15′26″N 122°53′29″W	117.8 (386)	38	2020	Residential	Listed as Lougheed Heights II on SkyscraperPage.
10	Oasis		Coquitlam Town Centre 49°16′55″N 122°47′55″W	114.3 (375)	38	2013	Residential	Tallest building in Coquitlam from 2013 to 2016.
11	1123 Westwood	–	Coquitlam Town Centre 49°16′43″N 122°47′22″W	112.8 (370)	36	2015	Residential	
12	Levo I	–	Coquitlam Town Centre 49°16′53″N 122°47′44″W	108.5 (356)	37	2009	Residential	Tallest building in Coquitlam from 2009 to 2013.
13	Obelisk		Coquitlam Town Centre 49°16′53″N 122°47′32″W	105.2 (345)	35	2008	Residential	Tallest building in Coquitlam briefly from 2008 to 2009. First building in Coquitlam to exceed 100 metres (328 ft) in height.
14	Hensley	–	West Coquitlam 49°14′53″N 122°53′24″W	102.4 (336)	33	2022	Residential	Tallest building in Coquitlam outside of both Coquitlam Town Centre and Burquitlam.

== Tallest under construction or proposed ==
=== Under construction ===
The following table includes buildings under construction in Coquitlam that are planned to be at least 100 m (328 ft) tall, based on standard height measurement. The “Year” column indicates the expected year of completion. Buildings that are on hold are not included.

Name	Location	Height m (ft)	Floors	Year	Notes
Onni Coquitlam Centre 1	1175 Pinetree Way	156.7 (514)	49	2027	Proposed in 2019. Will become the tallest building in Coquitlam Town Centre upon completion.
Band	668 Whiting Way	143.3 (470)	45	2026	
Elmwood	612 Elmwood Street	125.8 (413)	38	2026	

== Timeline of tallest buildings ==
Name	Image	Years as tallest	Height m (ft)	Floors	Reference
The Selkirk at Westwood Place	–	1995–2008	72.6 (238)	24	
Obelisk		2008–2009	105.2 (345)	35	
Levo I	–	2009–2013	108.5 (356)	37	
Oasis		2013–2016	114.3 (375)	38	
MThree		2016–2021	129.8 (426)	48	
567 Clarke + Como		2021–present	162.2 (532)	49	

== Skylines ==
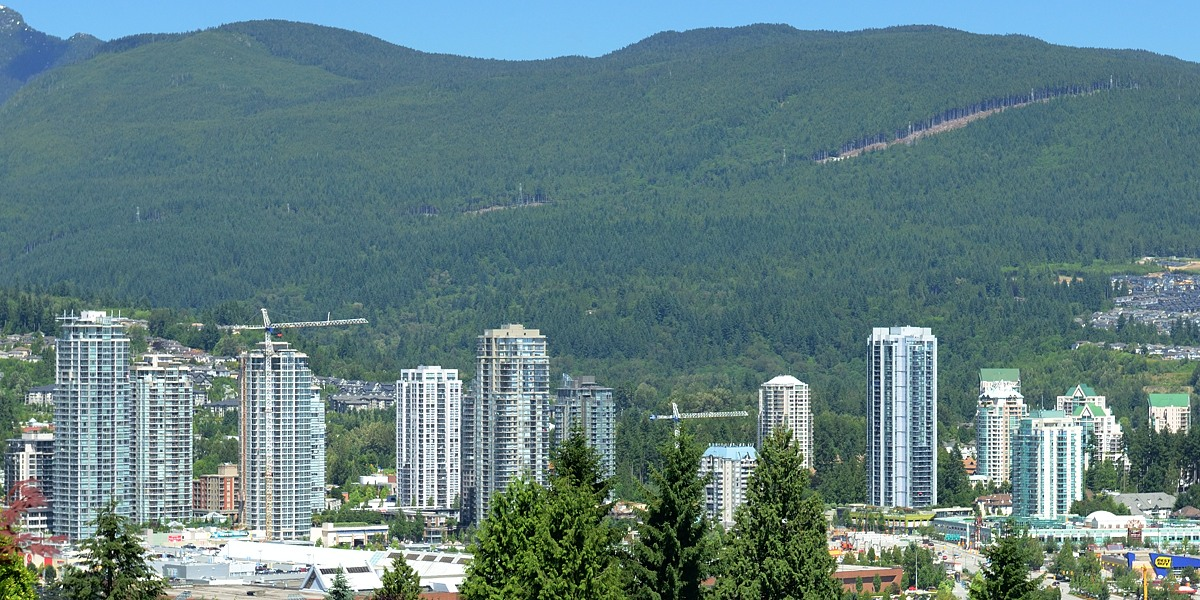
Coquitlam Town Centre

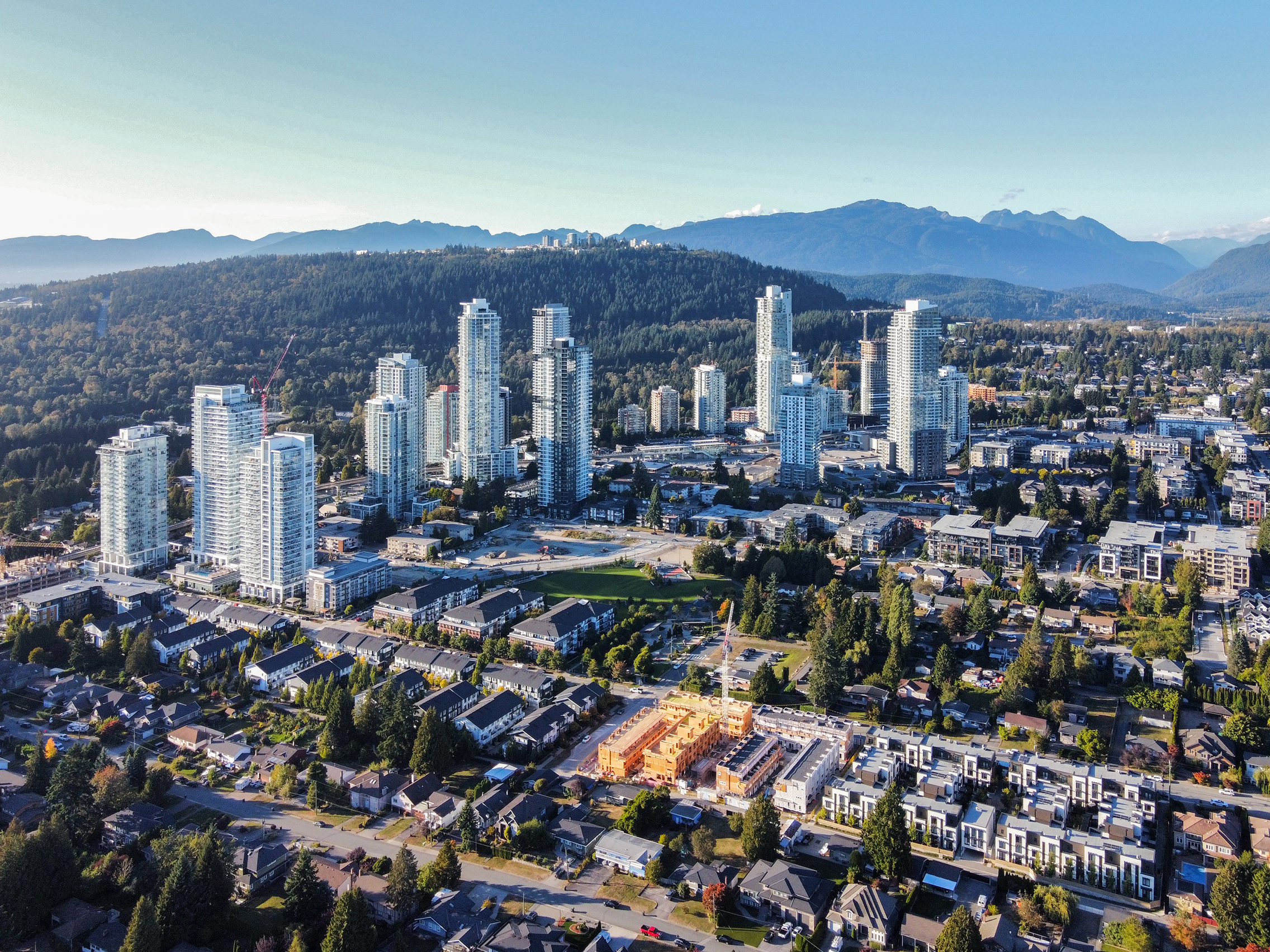
Burquitlam

== See also ==
- List of tallest buildings in British Columbia
- List of tallest buildings in Vancouver
- List of tallest buildings in Burnaby
- List of tallest buildings in Surrey
