= Inlet Centre station =

Metro Vancouver SkyTrain station

Inlet Centre

General information
- Location: 2300 Barnet Hwy, Port Moody
- Coordinates: 49°16′38″N 122°49′40″W
- System: SkyTrain station
- Owner: TransLink
- Platforms: Side platform
- Tracks: 2

Construction
- Structure type: Below grade, enclosed
- Accessible: yes

Other information
- Fare zone: 3

History
- Opened: December 2, 2016
- Former names: Ioco (planning)

Passengers
- 2025: 637,000 ▼2.6%
- Rank: 50 of 54

Services
| Preceding station | TransLink | Following station |
|---|---|---|
| Moody Centre towards VCC–Clark | Millennium Line | Coquitlam Central towards Lafarge Lake–Douglas |
Location

Inlet Centre is a below-grade station on the Millennium Line of Metro Vancouver's SkyTrain rapid transit system. It is located in Port Moody, British Columbia, Canada and opened for service on December 2, 2016, along with the rest of the Evergreen Extension.

== Location ==
Inlet Centre is located underneath the Barnet Highway overpass for the Canadian Pacific Railway located at Ioco Road, with the guideway leading into the station running parallel to railway. The high-density neighbourhoods of NewPort Village and Suter Brook are located just north of the station.

== Station information ==
=== Entrances ===
- West entrance: is located on the west side of Barnet Highway. Bus bay 1 and 2 are located closest to this entrance.
- East entrance: is located on the east side of Barnet Highway. Bus bay 3 is located closest to this entrance.

=== Transit connections ===
Inlet Centre station provides connections to several Tri-Cities bus routes. Bus bay assignments are as follows:

| Bay | Route |
|---|---|
| 1 | 160 Kootenay Loop; 183 Moody Centre Station; N9 Downtown (NightBus service) |
| 2 | 160 Port Coquitlam Station; 179 Buntzen Lake (July to September only); 183 Coquitlam Central Station; N9 Coquitlam Central Station (NightBus service) |
| 3 | 184 Noons Creek |
| 4 | HandyDART service |

== Public art ==
Mother and Child on a Bike (2016), by Parvaneh Roudgar

Evergreen People (2016), by Alberto Cerritos, Rosalina Cerritos and Jaime Torres
