= Port Moody station =

Former railway station in British Columbia, Canada

Port Moody
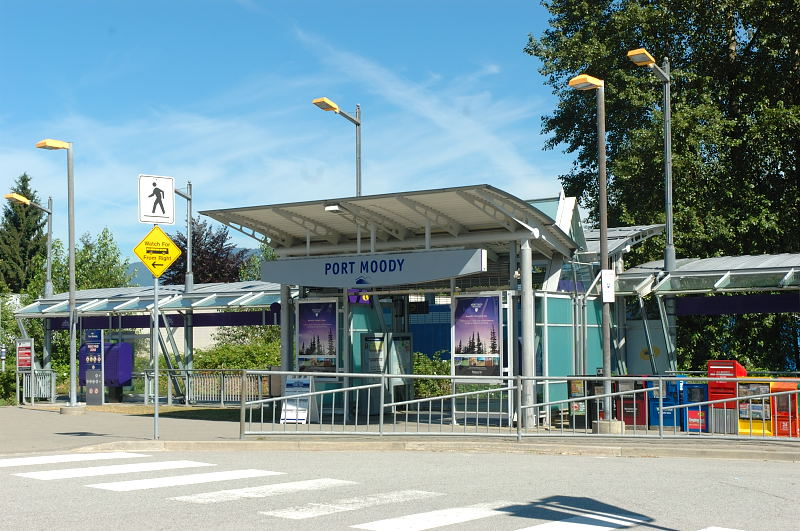

General information
- Location: 65 Williams St, Port Moody; Canada
- Coordinates: 49°16′41″N 122°50′47″W
- System: Former West Coast Express station
- Owner: BC Transit, TransLink
- Line: Canadian Pacific Railway
- Platforms: 1 side platform
- Tracks: 2 (Canadian Pacific Railway)

Construction
- Structure type: At grade
- Parking: 300 spaces
- Cycle facilities: lockers

Other information
- Fare zone: 3

History
- Opened: 1882 (original station); 1995 (West Coast Express)
- Closed: December 1, 2016

Services
Preceding station	TransLink	Following station
Former services
Waterfront Terminus	West Coast Express (1995–2016)	Coquitlam Central towards Mission City
Location

Port Moody station was a stop on the West Coast Express commuter rail line connecting Vancouver to Mission, British Columbia, Canada. The station was located on the south side of the Canadian Pacific Railway (CPR) tracks in Port Moody, at the north foot of Williams Street, approximately 200 metres (660 ft) north of St. John's Street. The station opened in 1995, when the West Coast Express began operating. All services were operated by TransLink.

The station closed for revenue service on December 1, 2016, coinciding with the opening of SkyTrain's Evergreen Extension the next day. Moody Centre station serves as a replacement station and continues to be served by the West Coast Express commuter rail service.

== History ==
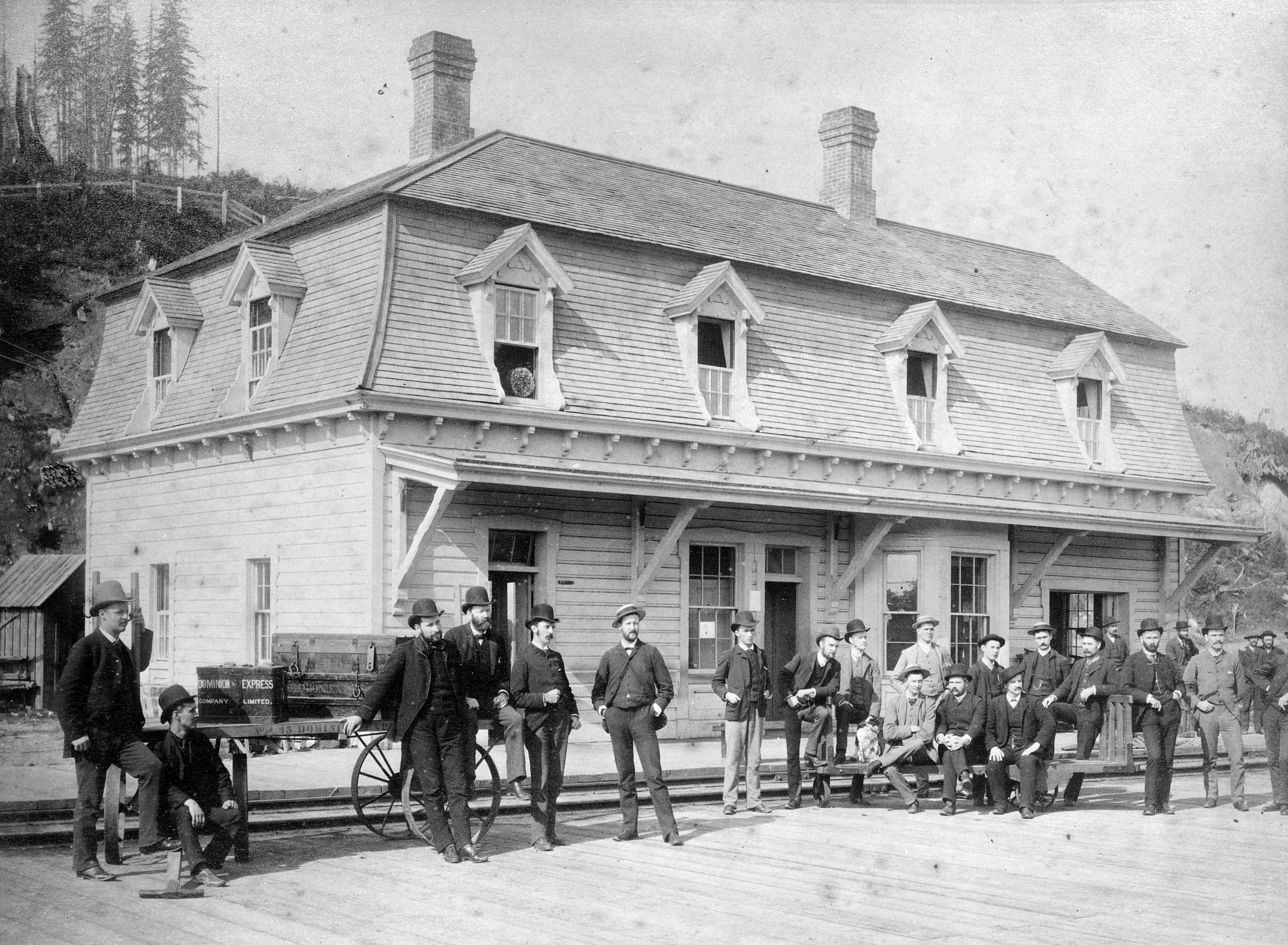
First 1882 CPR station

The first station in Port Moody was built in 1882 as the original western terminus for the Canadian Pacific Railway, before it was extended to Vancouver. The second railway station, built in 1908, was first moved to a location west of Queen Street in 1945 and, when the CPR discontinued passenger service in 1976, was bought by The Port Moody Historical Society, who moved it again in 1978 to Murray Street, where it now serves as the home of the Port Moody Station Museum.

== Services ==
Port Moody was served by five West Coast Express trains per day in each direction: five in the morning to Vancouver, and five in the evening to Mission. In addition, there were two inbound buses (branded as "TrainBus") operating from Mission to Vancouver in the morning (after morning train service has ended) and three outbound buses in the evening returning to Mission (after all evening train service has ended), stopping at all West Coast Express stations. There were no West Coast Express service on weekends and holidays. The station was adjacent to a bus loop and park-and-ride facility (now incorporated with Moody Centre station), which were served by the local bus, express bus, and Community Shuttle minibus services.

At the nearby intersection of St. John's Street and Williams Street, 97 B-Line buses provided service to Coquitlam Central and Lougheed Town Centre stations.
