= Lincoln station (SkyTrain) =

Metro Vancouver SkyTrain station

Lincoln
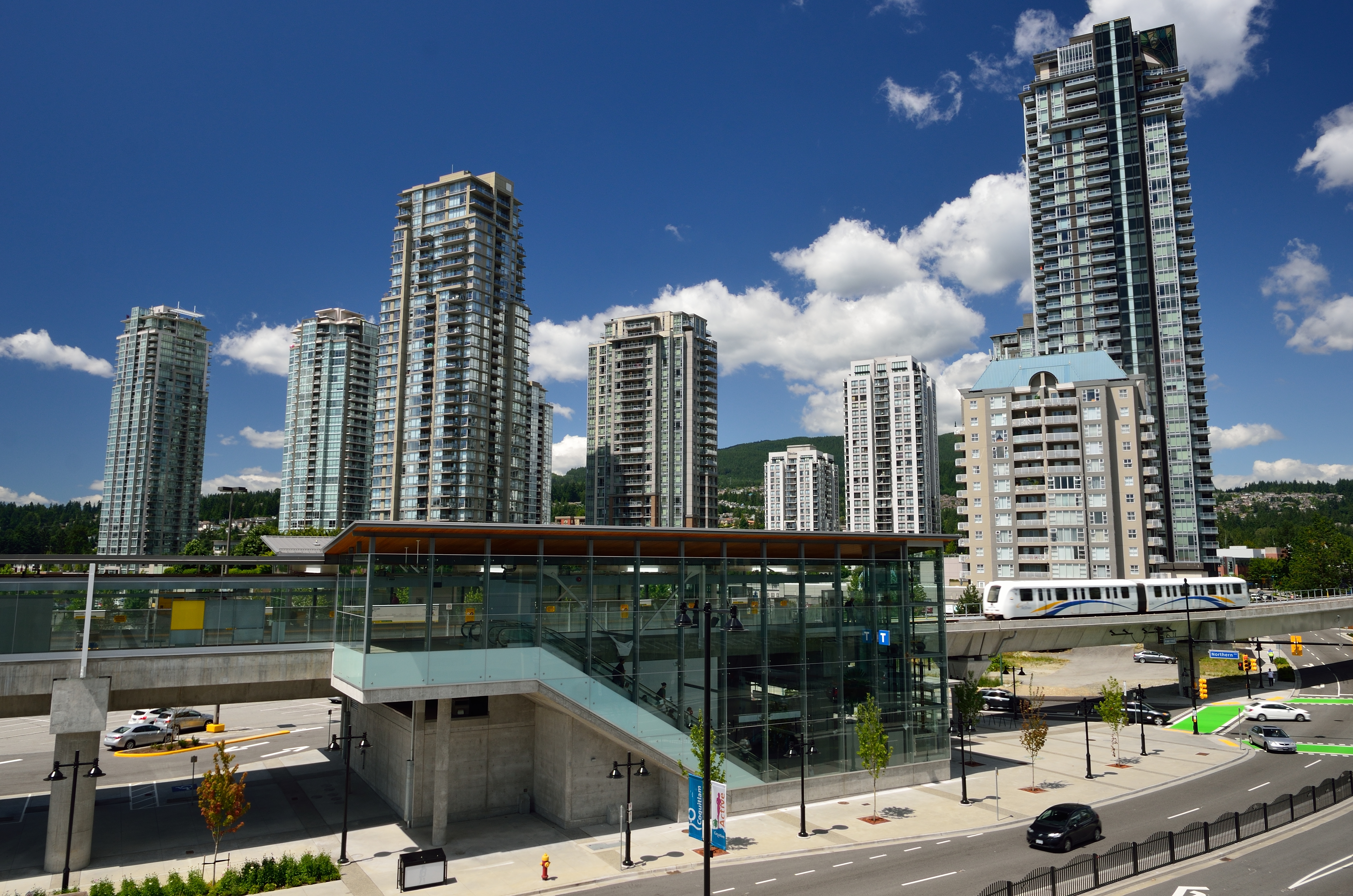
- Lincoln station viewed from the southeast

General information
- Location: 1140 Pinetree Way, Coquitlam
- Coordinates: 49.280425°N 122.793915°W
- System: SkyTrain station
- Owner: TransLink
- Platforms: Side platforms
- Tracks: 2

Construction
- Structure type: Elevated
- Accessible: yes
- Architect: Perkins+Will

Other information
- Station code: LN
- Fare zone: 3

History
- Opened: December 2, 2016

Passengers
- 2025: 1,245,000 ▲2%
- Rank: 40 of 54

Services
Preceding station	TransLink	Following station
Coquitlam Central towards VCC–Clark	Millennium Line	Lafarge Lake–Douglas Terminus
Location

Lincoln is an elevated station on the Millennium Line of Metro Vancouver's SkyTrain rapid transit system in Coquitlam, British Columbia. It is located on Pinetree Way, situated between Lincoln and Northern Avenues. Coquitlam Centre and Henderson Place shopping centres are located within walking distance from the station.

== History ==
Lincoln station was opened in 2016 along with five other stations when the Millennium Line's Evergreen Extension was completed. The station was designed by the architecture firm Perkins+Will.

The initial plan for the extension did not include Lincoln station as it was determined that Coquitlam Central station would be sufficiently close to the nearby shopping centres and various amenities; however, the owners of the Coquitlam Centre mall and the developers of other nearby residential projects wanted a closer station. As a result, the station was added to the project and the requesting parties paid the $28-million cost for its construction.

== Station information ==
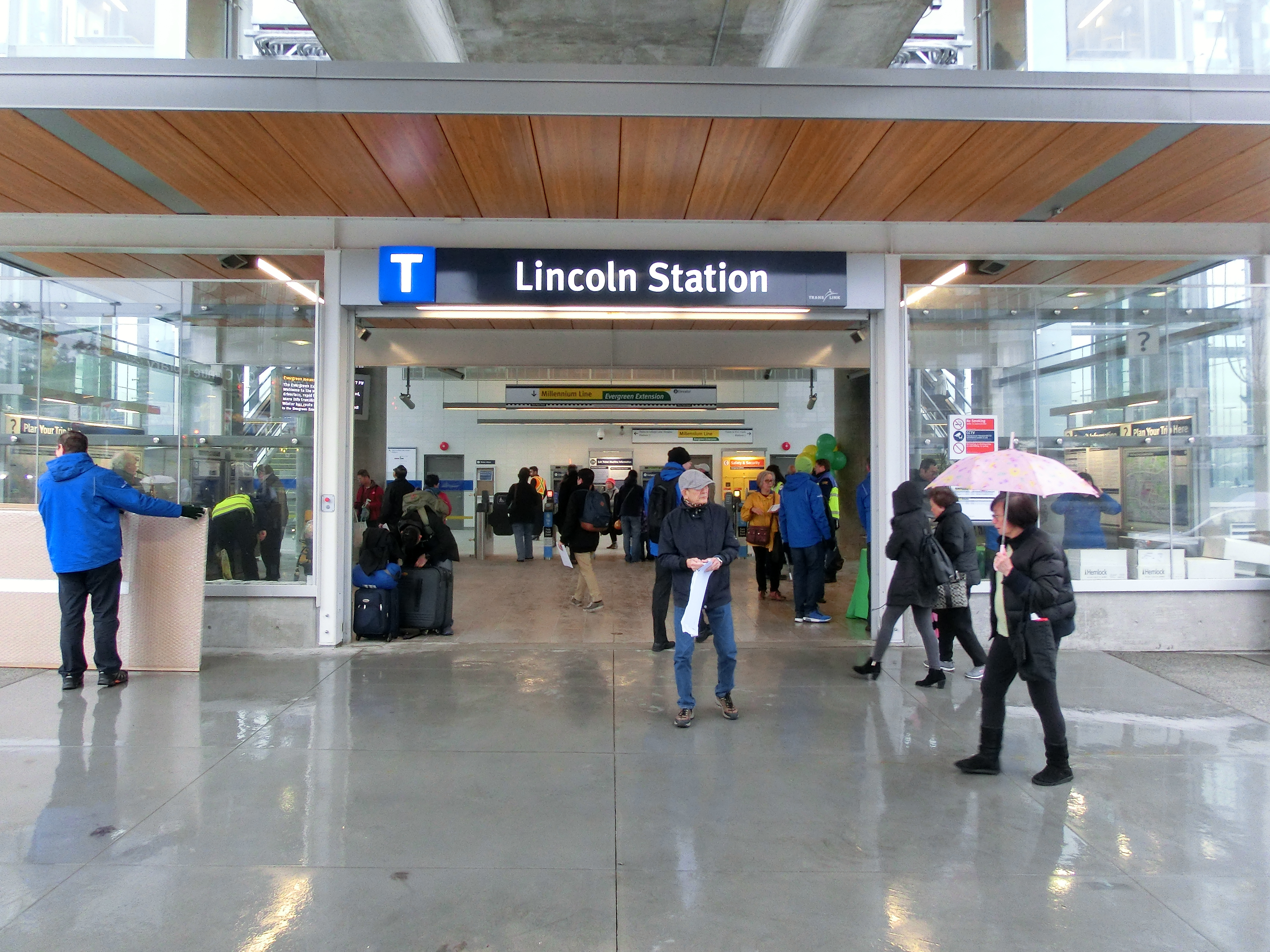
Entrance to Lincoln station

=== Entrances ===
Lincoln station is served by a single entrance facing the north end of the station. The entrance is located at the southwest corner of the intersection of Northern Avenue and Pinetree Way.

=== Transit connections ===
Lincoln station provides connections to several Tri-Cities bus routes. Bus bay assignments are as follows:

Bay	Routes
1	160 Port Coquitlam Station; 183 Coquitlam Central Station; 186 Coquitlam Central Station; 188 Coquitlam Central Station; N9 Coquitlam Central Station (NightBus service)
2	160 Kootenay Loop; 183 Moody Centre Station; 186 Hampton Park; 188 Port Coquitlam Station; N9 Downtown (NightBus service)
