= Tri-Cities (British Columbia) =

Geographical grouping in Metro Vancouver

Coordinates: 49°16′N 122°47′W

The Tri-Cities within the MVRD.

The Tri-Cities are an informal grouping of the three adjacent suburban cities of Coquitlam, Port Coquitlam, and Port Moody, along with the two villages of Anmore and Belcarra in the northeast sector of Metro Vancouver in British Columbia. Combined, these five communities had a population of 246,701 residents in 2021.

== Demographics ==
=== Population by municipality ===
==== 2016 Census ====
Municipality	Type	Population
Anmore	village	2,210
Belcarra	village	643
Coquitlam	city	139,284
Port Coquitlam	city	58,612
Port Moody	city	33,551

==== 2021 Census ====
Municipality	Type	Population
Anmore	village	2,356
Belcarra	village	687
Coquitlam	city	148,625
Port Coquitlam	city	61,498
Port Moody	city	33,535

=== Population by ethnic groups ===
Ethnic groups in the Tri-Cities (2016) Source:		Population	%
Ethnic group	European	128,835	55.5%
Ethnic group	East Asian	54,875	23.6%
Ethnic group	Middle Eastern	12,275	5.3%
Ethnic group	Southeast Asian	11,265	4.9%
Ethnic group	South Asian	9,810	4.2%
Ethnic group	Indigenous	7,515	3.2%
Ethnic group	Latin American	3,690	1.6%
Ethnic group	Black	2,720	1.2%
Ethnic group	Other	4,165	1.8%
Total population		234,300	100%

== Education ==
The Tri-Cities area is serviced by School District No. 43, which is the third largest school district in British Columbia, with 33,033 students in the 2016/17 year.

== Media ==
The Tri-Cities area has access to a wide variety of media available in the Lower Mainland. However, only one local newspaper, the Tri-City News, remained in publication following the mergers and shutdowns of several outlets owned by Glacier Media.

CKPM-FM in Port Moody became the first radio station dedicated to the Tri-Cities area when it launched in 2012, however the station stopped broadcasting in 2019 after its licence was not renewed by the Canadian Radio-television and Telecommunications Commission.

== Transportation ==
=== Roads ===
For motorists, the Trans-Canada Highway provides freeway access to Burnaby, Vancouver, Surrey, and other municipalities in the Lower Mainland. Lougheed Highway is an alternative route to the Trans-Canada, entering Coquitlam via Maillardville, continuing north to Coquitlam Centre before turning sharply east through Port Coquitlam and then into Pitt Meadows via the Pitt River Bridge. Barnet Highway begins at the Coquitlam Centre area and continues west through Port Moody to Burnaby and downtown Vancouver.

=== Public transit ===
Public transport in the Tri-City area is provided by TransLink, the regional transportation authority for Metro Vancouver.

The area has been served by SkyTrain since the completion of the Evergreen Extension of the Millennium Line on December 2, 2016. The extension connects Lougheed Town Centre in Burnaby to the Tri-Cities, with six stations spanning from the southwestern part of Coquitlam into Port Moody and central Coquitlam, where it terminates at Lafarge Lake–Douglas station.

The West Coast Express, which runs from Downtown Vancouver to Mission, also stops at Port Coquitlam station, Coquitlam Central station, and Moody Centre station.

=== Business ===
Businesses in the Tri-City area are represented by the Tri-Cities Chamber of Commerce.
