= Coquitlam Centre (disambiguation) =

Coquitlam Centre could refer to:

- Coquitlam Centre, a shopping mall in Coquitlam, British Columbia, Canada
- Coquitlam Town Centre, the city centre region of Coquitlam
- Coquitlam Central station, a transit station in Coquitlam
