= Henderson Place Mall =

Shopping mall in Coquitlam, British Columbia, Canada

Coordinates: 49.28111°N 122.796086°W

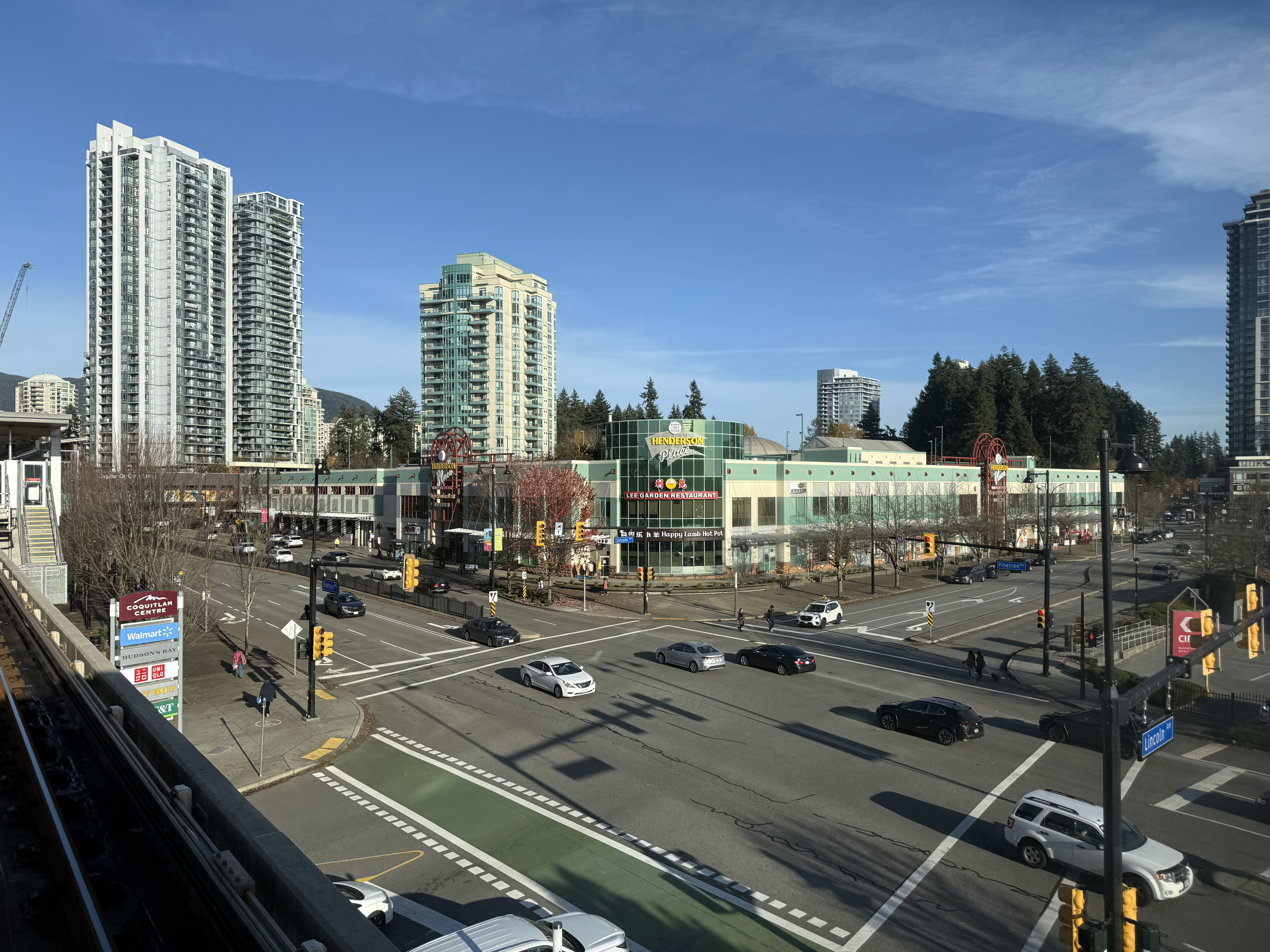
Henderson Place Mall

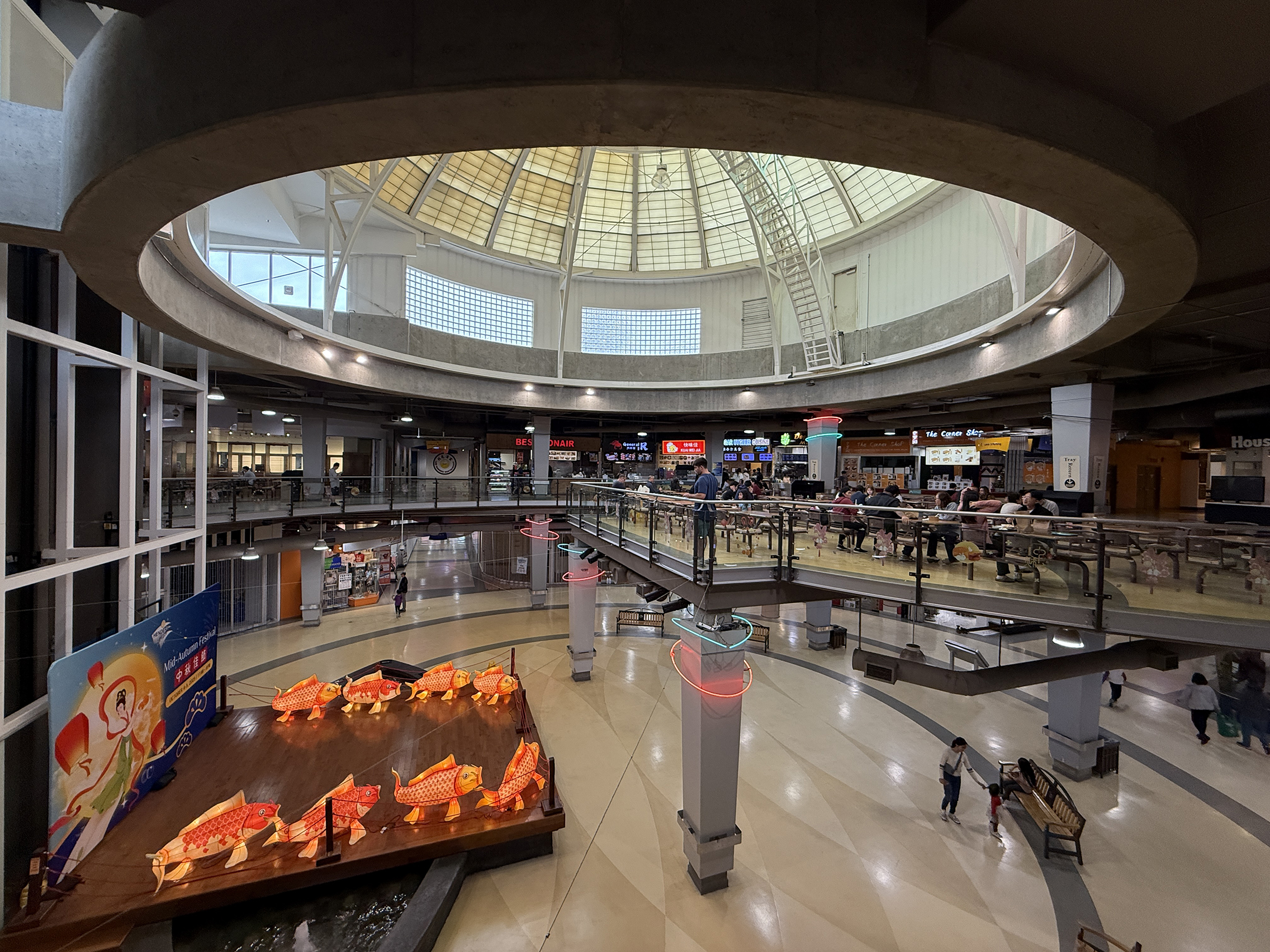
Atrium

Henderson Place Mall is a Chinese themed mall in the Town Centre area of Coquitlam, British Columbia. It is located on Pinetree Way across from Coquitlam Centre and Lincoln Station of the Millennium Line. Opened in 1999, it has 245,000 square feet of retail space.

The mall was developed by Hong Kong developer Henderson Land. In 2019, it was offered for sale through CBRE Group.

== Gallery ==
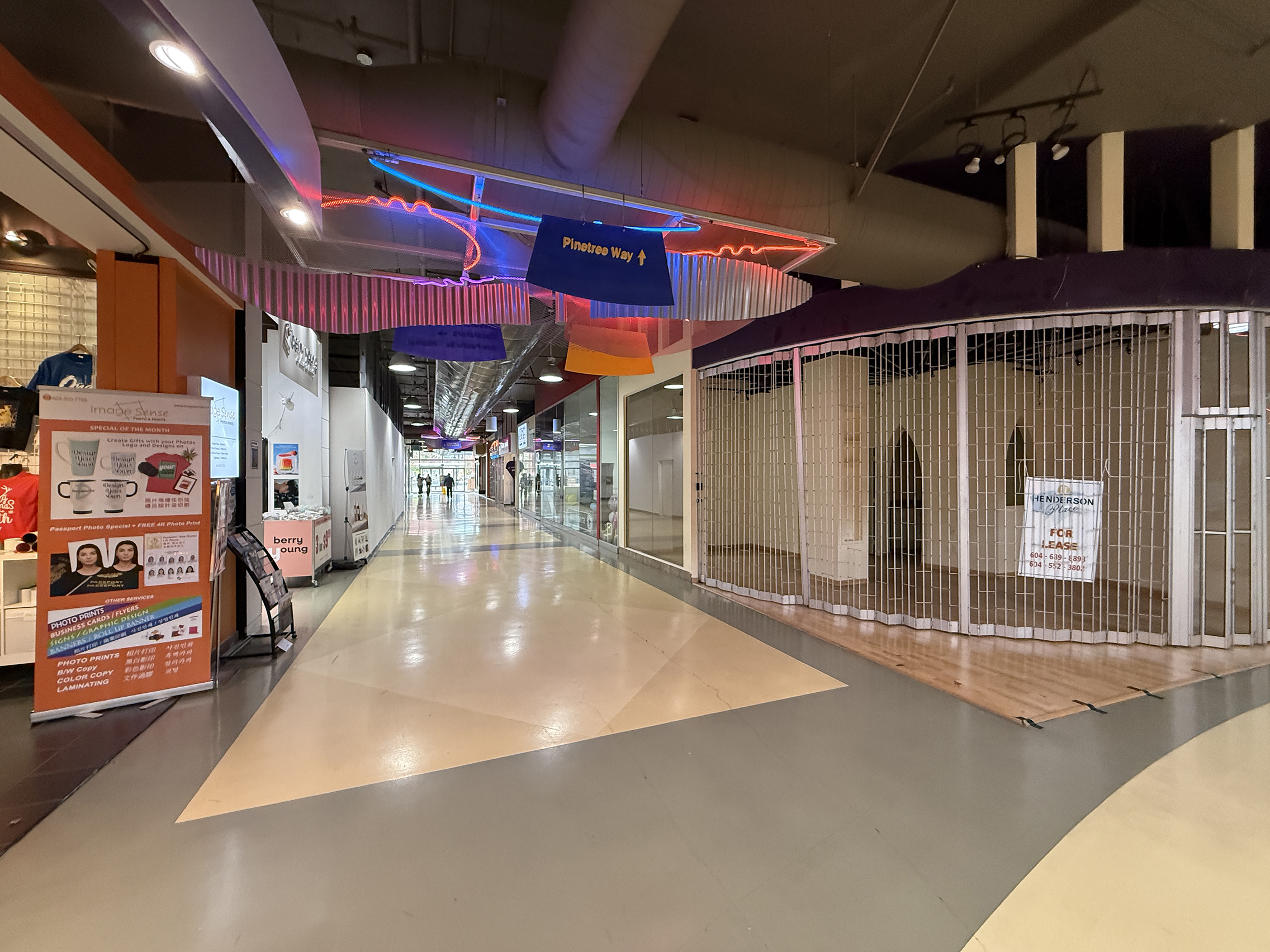
Level 1

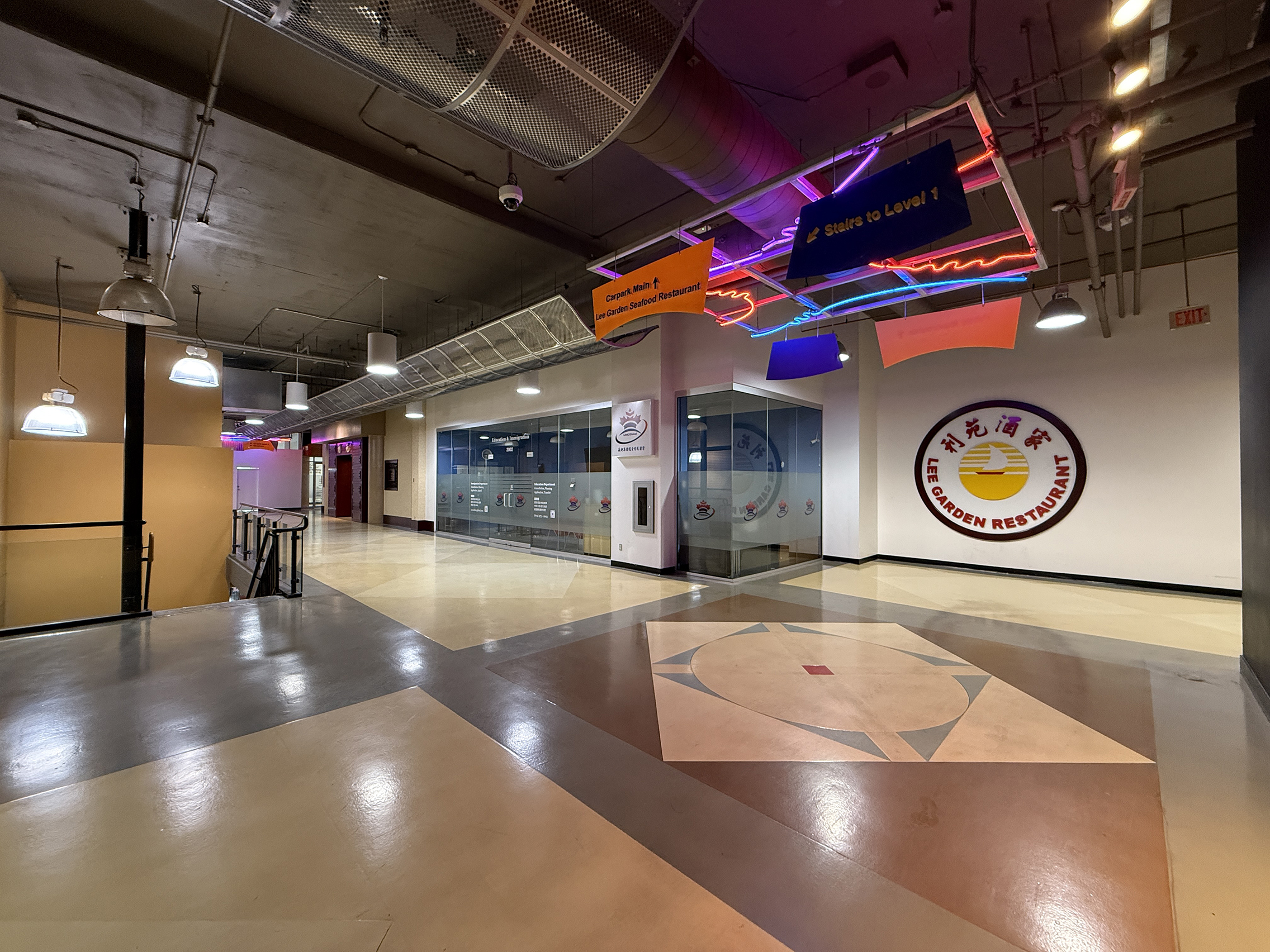
Level 2

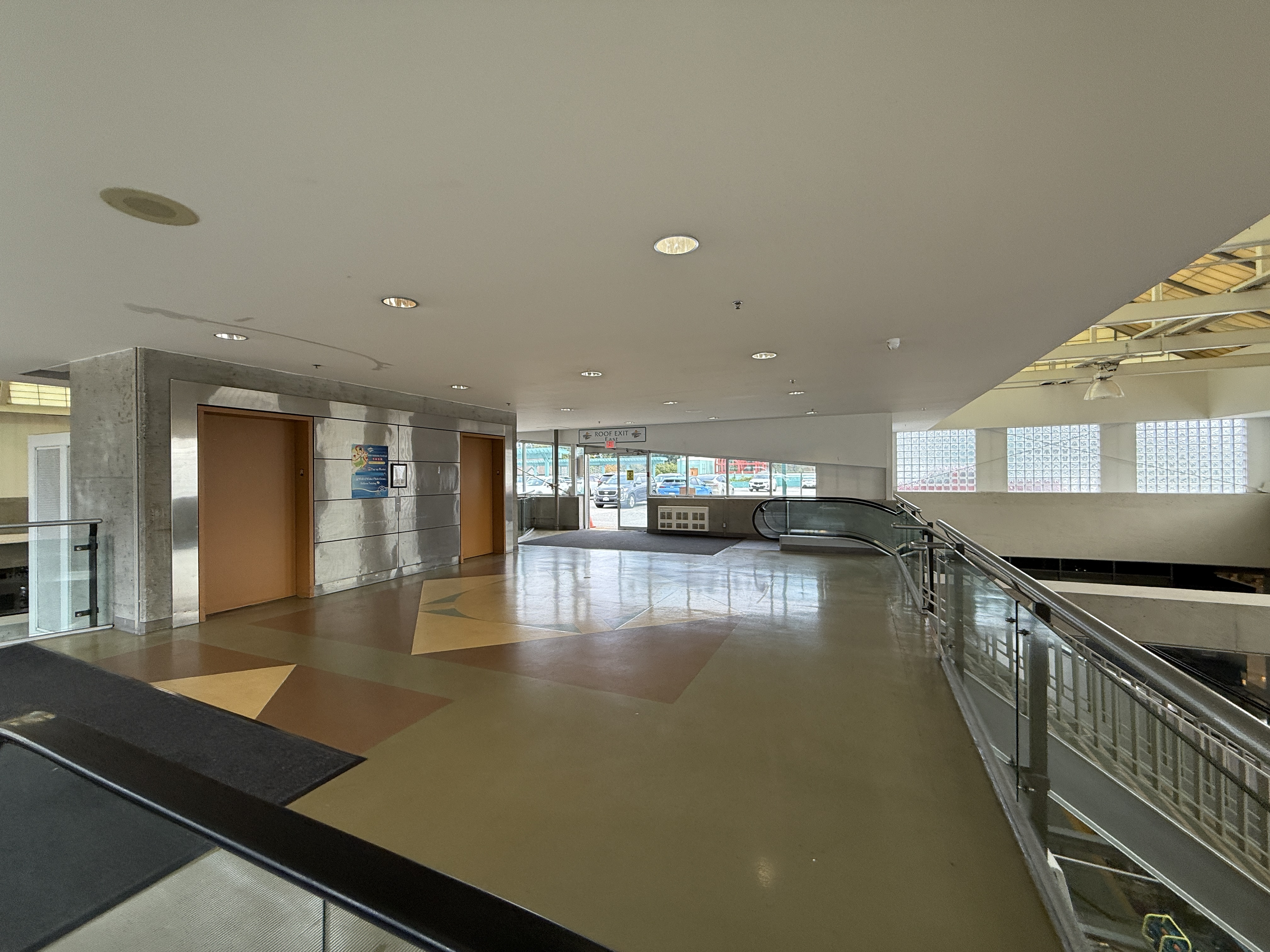
Level 3 lift lobby and carpark
