= Evergreen Line =

Evergreen Line can refer to one of the following:

- The Evergreen Extension to the Millennium Line rapid transit route in Vancouver, British Columbia
- The fleet of container ships operated by Evergreen Marine
