= Moody Centre station =

Metro Vancouver public transportation station

Moody Centre
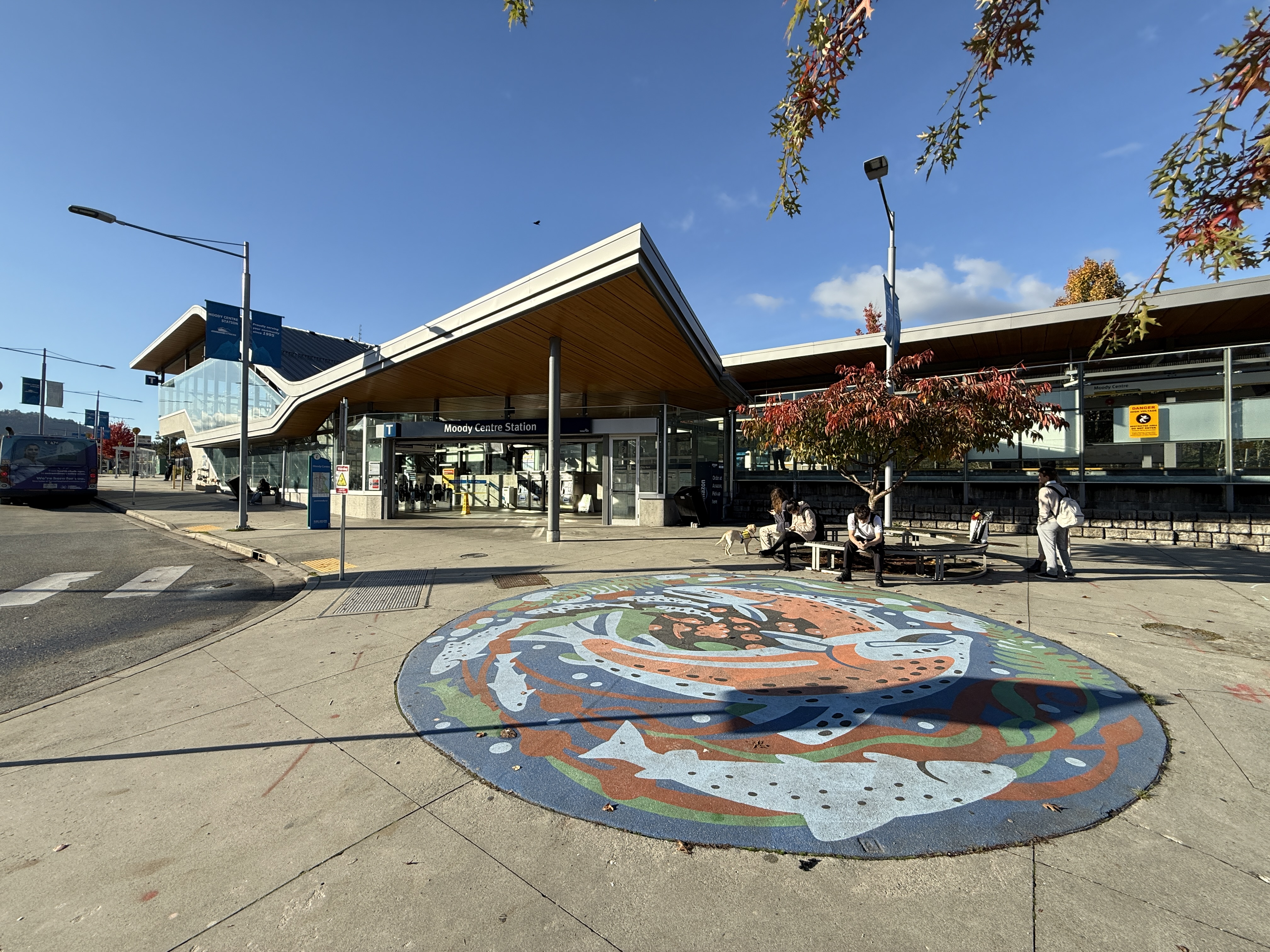
- Moody Centre station exterior

General information
- Location: 65 Williams Street, Port Moody
- Coordinates: 49.27806°N 122.84579°W
- System: TransLink station
- Owner: TransLink
- Platforms: Side platform (West Coast Express); Centre platform (SkyTrain)
- Tracks: 2 (West Coast Express); 2 (SkyTrain)

Construction
- Structure type: At-grade, enclosed
- Parking: 393 spaces
- Accessible: yes

Other information
- Fare zone: 3

History
- Opened: November 1, 1995 (West Coast Express); December 2, 2016 (SkyTrain)

Passengers
- 2025: 792,000 ▲0.5%
- Rank: 47 of 54

Services
Preceding station	TransLink	Following station
Burquitlam towards VCC–Clark	Millennium Line	Inlet Centre towards Lafarge Lake–Douglas
Waterfront Terminus	West Coast Express	Coquitlam Central towards Mission City
Location

Moody Centre station is an intermodal rapid transit station in Metro Vancouver served by both the Millennium Line—part of the SkyTrain system—and the region's West Coast Express commuter rail system. It is located in Port Moody, British Columbia, on the south side of the Canadian Pacific Railway (CPR) tracks, at the north foot of Williams Street, approximately 200 metres (660 ft) north of St. Johns Street.

Moody Centre replaced the previous Port Moody station on the West Coast Express. The new station opened on December 2, 2016, along with the rest of the Evergreen Extension.

== Station information ==
Moody Centre station provides a transit exchange and park and ride facility at the south side of the station.

=== Entrances ===
- Main Entrance: located near the southeast end of the platform. Passengers using either platform or connecting to West Coast Express must go through an overhead walkway to cross the tracks.
- West Coast Express Entrance: located past the main entrance, above the inbound platform (Platform 1). It provides direct access to the West Coast Express.

=== Transit connections ===
Bus bay assignments are as follows:

Bay	Route	Destination
1	—	Unloading only
2	—	HandyDART service
3	183	Coquitlam Central Station
4	160	Port Coquitlam Station
5	160	Kootenay Loop
6	180	Lougheed Station
7	181	Ioco
8	182	Belcarra
9	184	Noons Creek

Although the N9 NightBus does not enter the bus exchange, it stops adjacent to the station on St. Johns Street at Williams Street.

== Gallery ==
SkyTrain tracks

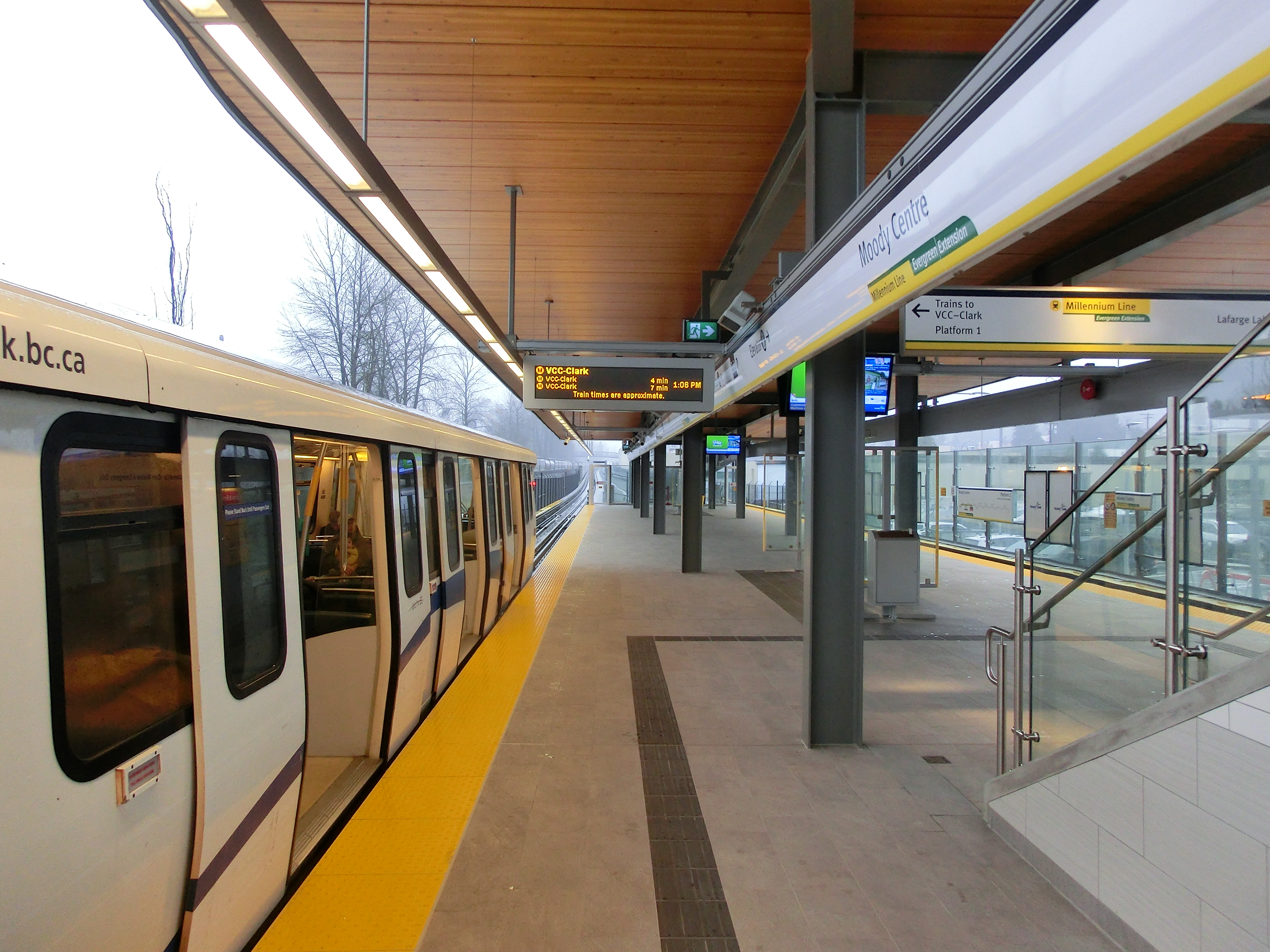
SkyTrain platform

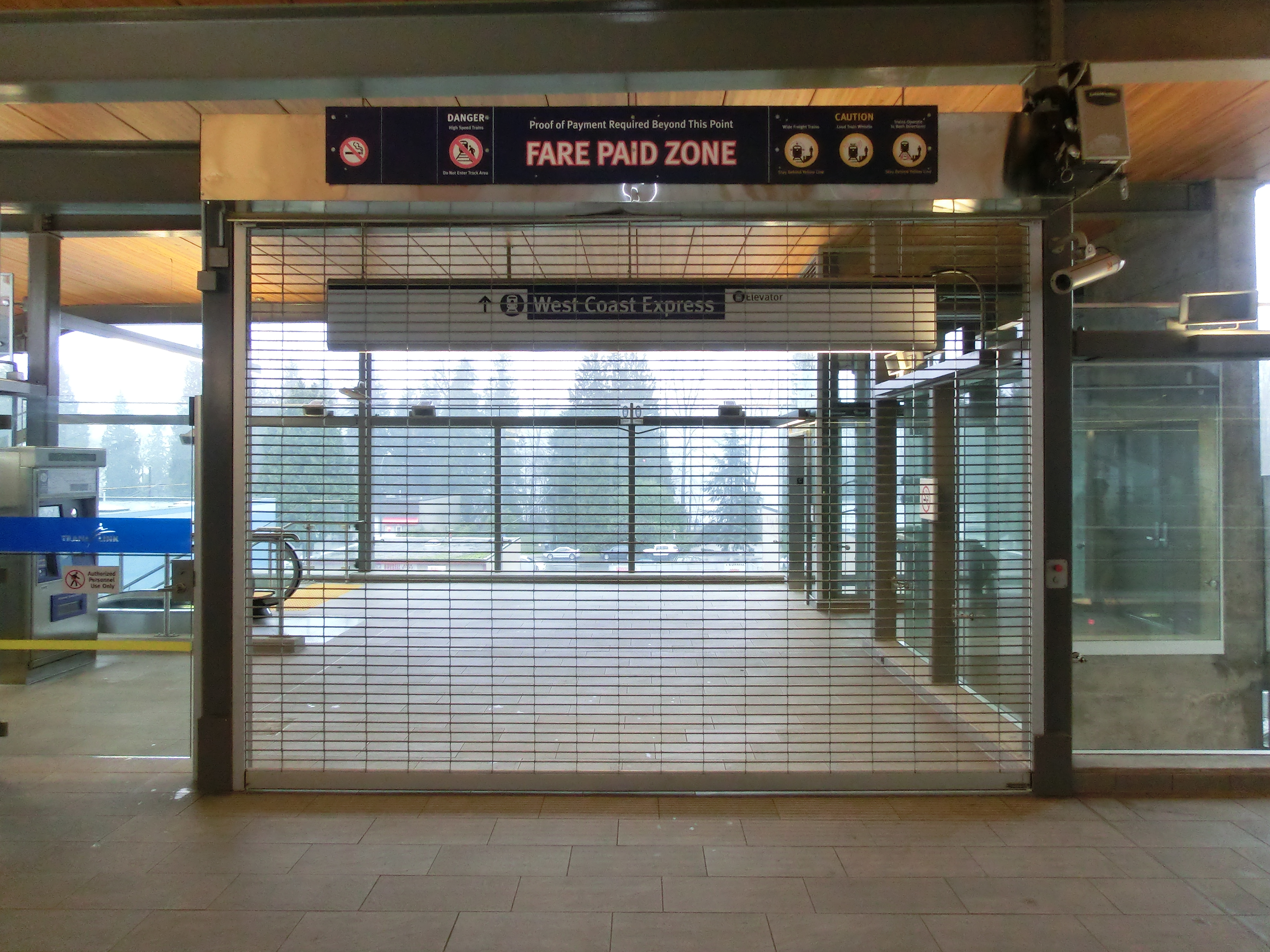
West Coast Express entrance

West Coast Express platform
