= Lafarge Lake–Douglas station =

Metro Vancouver SkyTrain station

Lafarge Lake–Douglas
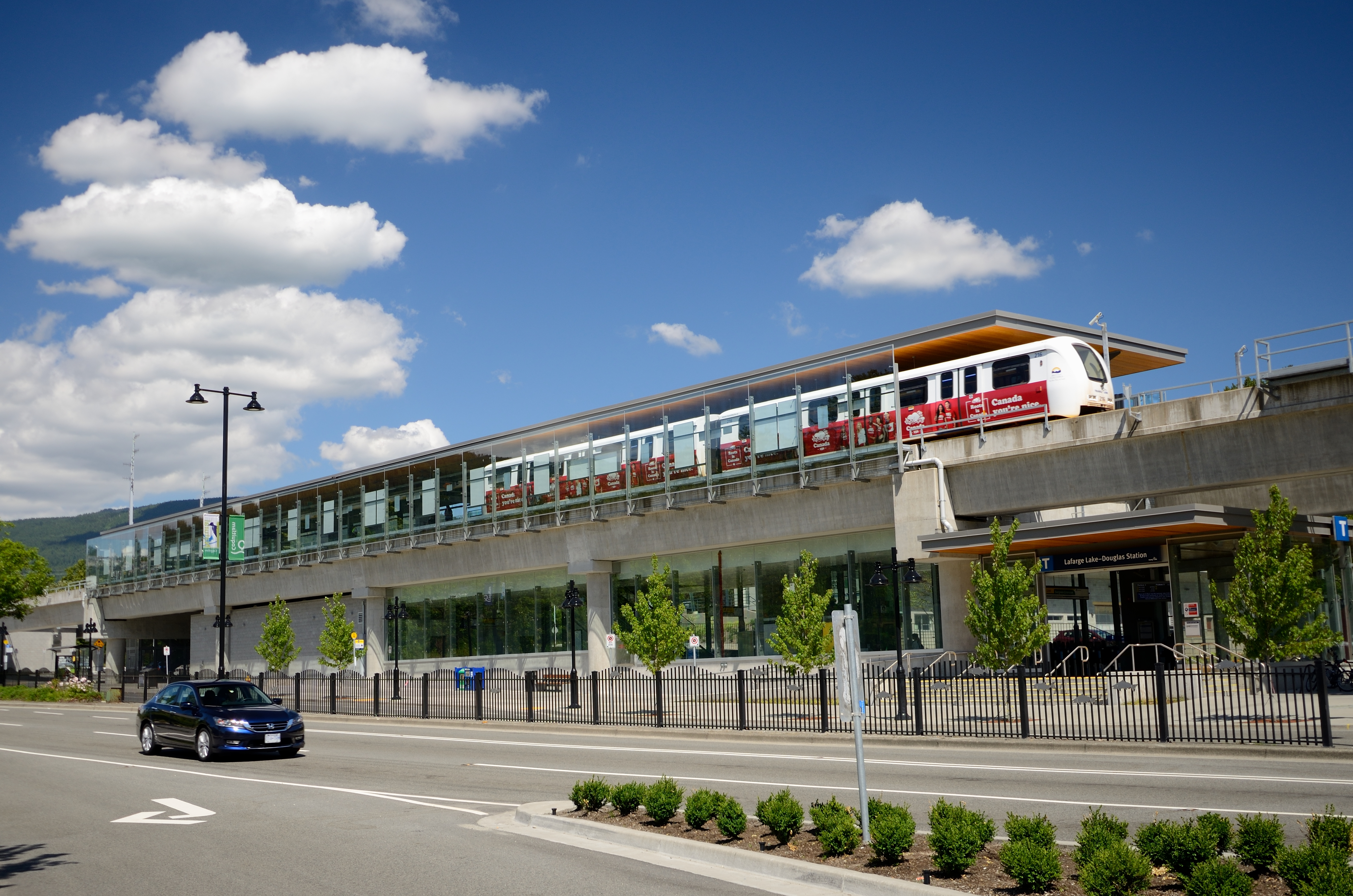

General information
- Location: 1201 Pinetree Way, Coquitlam, British Columbia, Canada
- Coordinates: 49°17′8″N 122°47′30″W
- System: SkyTrain station
- Owner: TransLink
- Platforms: Centre platform
- Tracks: 2

Construction
- Structure type: Elevated
- Accessible: yes

Other information
- Fare zone: 3

History
- Opened: December 2, 2016

Passengers
- 2025: 754,000 ▲1.1%
- Rank: 49 of 54

Services
Preceding station	TransLink	Following station
Lincoln towards VCC–Clark	Millennium Line	Terminus
Location

Lafarge Lake–Douglas is a rapid transit station on the Millennium Line, part of Metro Vancouver's SkyTrain system, which serves as the line's outbound terminus. It is located in Coquitlam, British Columbia, Canada and opened for service on December 2, 2016, along with the rest of the Evergreen Extension.

The station features 4 bus passenger pickup/drop-off bays along Pinetree Way, a dedicated HandyDART area, night bus service, bike lockers/racks, and 150 City of Coquitlam-managed "Park and Ride" parking spaces.

== Location ==
Nearby amenities include the BMX bike park, City Centre Aquatic Complex, Coquitlam City Hall, Coquitlam RCMP and Fire Department, Coquitlam Town Centre, Douglas College (David Lam campus), Evergreen Cultural Centre, Lafarge Lake, Percy Perry Stadium, Pinetree Secondary School, Town Centre Park, and Tri-Cities Chamber of Commerce.

== Station information ==
=== Entrances ===
Lafarge Lake–Douglas station is served by a single entrance facing south, located at the northeast corner of the intersection of Guildford Way and Pinetree Way.

=== Transit connections ===
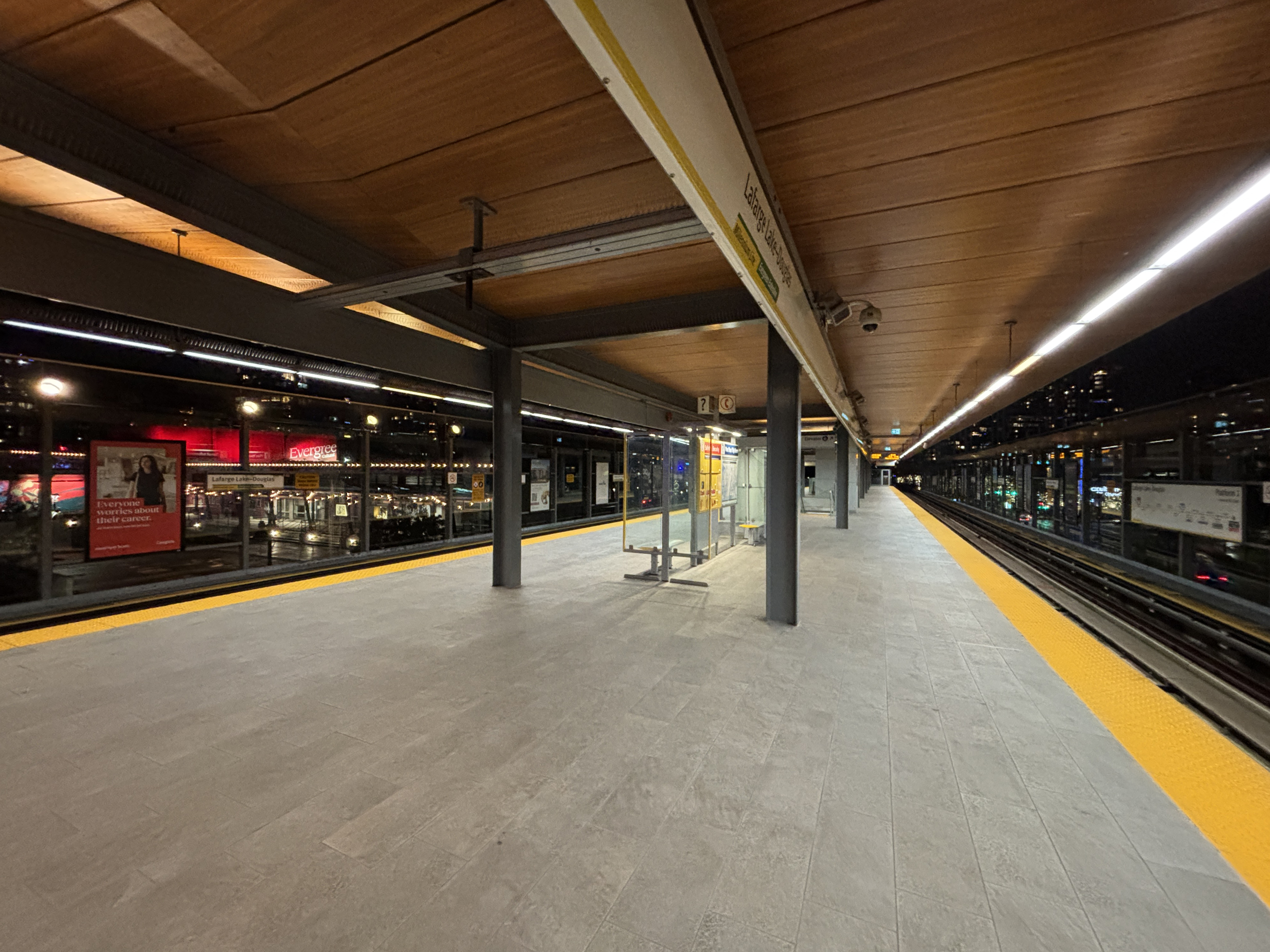
Station platform

Lafarge–Lake Douglas station provides connections to several Tri-Cities bus routes. Bus bay assignments are as follows:

Bay	Route number	Destination
1	183	Moody Centre Station
1	186	Hampton Park
1	188	Port Coquitlam Station
1	191	Princeton
2	183	Coquitlam Central Station
2	186	Coquitlam Central Station
2	188	Coquitlam Central Station
2	191	Coquitlam Central Station
3	160	Kootenay Loop
3	N9	Downtown NightBus
4		HandyDART

Another stop is located southbound at Pinetree Way at Guildford Way.

Stop Number	Route number	Destination
58666	160	Port Coquitlam Station
58666	N9	Coquitlam Central Station NightBus
