= Coquitlam Centre =

Shopping mall in British Columbia, Canada

Coordinates: 49.279647°N 122.798544°W

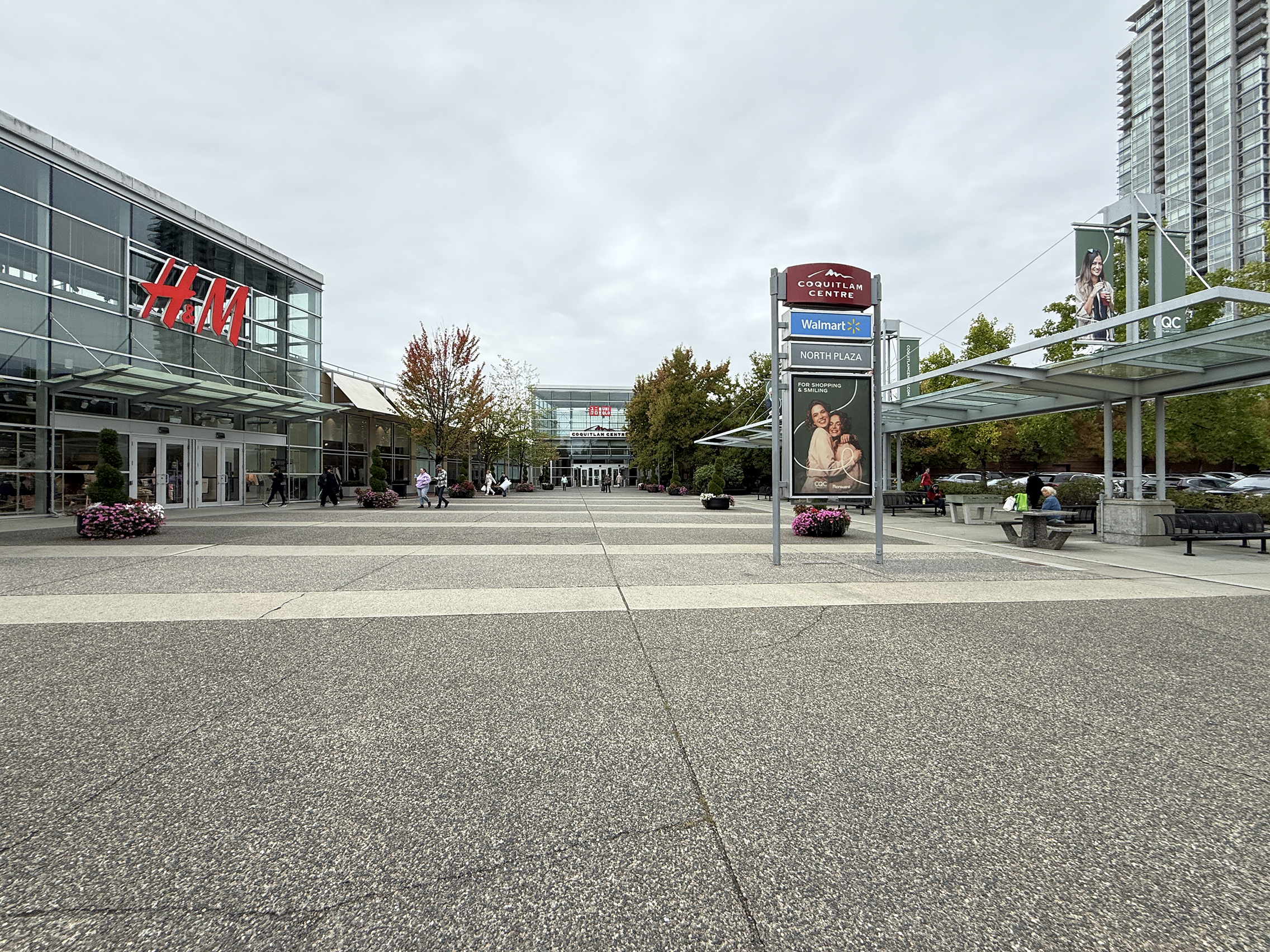
- Address: 2929 Barnet Highway; Coquitlam, British Columbia; Canada
- Opened: August 16, 1979; 47 years ago
- Manager: Morguard Investments Limited
- Owner: Pensionfund Realty Limited
- Num. of stores: 200
- Num. of anchor tenants: 6 (5 open, 1 opening fall 2018, 1 vacant)
- Floor area: 84,882 m^{2} (913,660 ft^{2})
- Floors: 2
- Website: coquitlamcentre.com

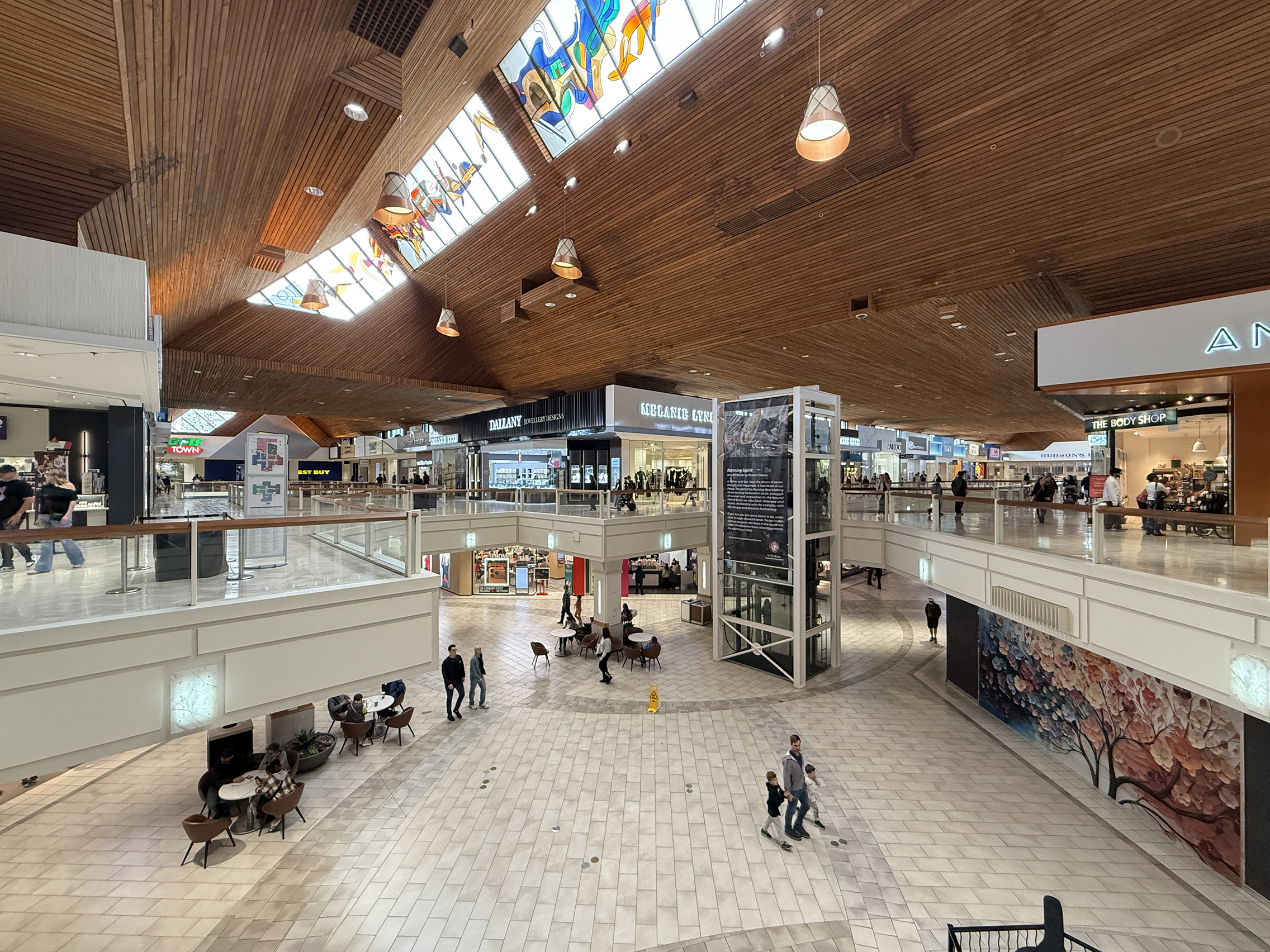
Atrium of the mall

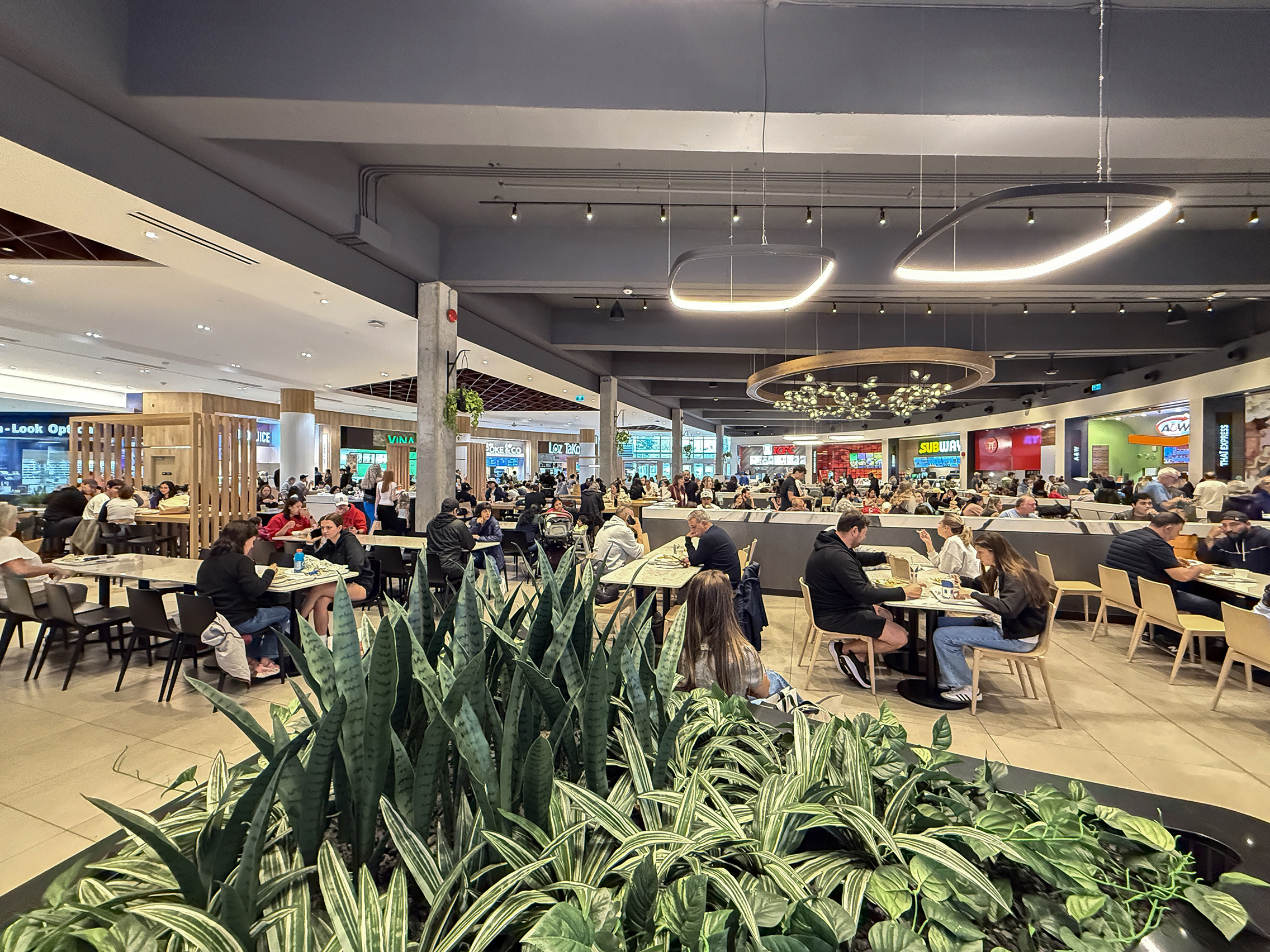
Food court on level 2

Coquitlam Centre is a shopping mall in Coquitlam, British Columbia, Canada, opened in 1979 and expanded in 2001. It is located at the southern edge of the Coquitlam Town Centre area, near Coquitlam Central station and several other smaller shopping centres. Coquitlam Centre is the largest mall in the Tri-Cities area, with an area of 84,882 square metres (913,665 ft^{2}) and 200 stores and services.

Coquitlam Centre is a super-regional sized shopping centre anchored by Walmart, Best Buy, Dollarama, London Drugs and T&T Supermarket.

== Transportation ==
Coquitlam Centre's location was chosen because it is at the intersection of Lougheed Highway and Barnet Highway, two major regional thoroughfares which provide access to Highway 1. The mall is located across Barnet Highway from Coquitlam Central station – a major transportation hub for the area with a public bus interchange, West Coast Express commuter rail station, and a SkyTrain station.

On July 19, 2012, the federal government, the City of Coquitlam, and Coquitlam Centre finalized a deal that added Lincoln station to the route of the SkyTrain's Evergreen extension. Lincoln station is located next to the mall across Pinetree Way.

== Film and television ==
The interior of the mall has been featured in several film and television productions, including the Academy Award-winning movie Juno, Ladies and Gentlemen, The Fabulous Stains, The Sisterhood of the Traveling Pants and Grumpy Cat's Worst Christmas Ever.

== See also ==
- List of shopping malls in Canada
