= Coquitlam Central station =

Metro Vancouver public transportation station

Coquitlam Central
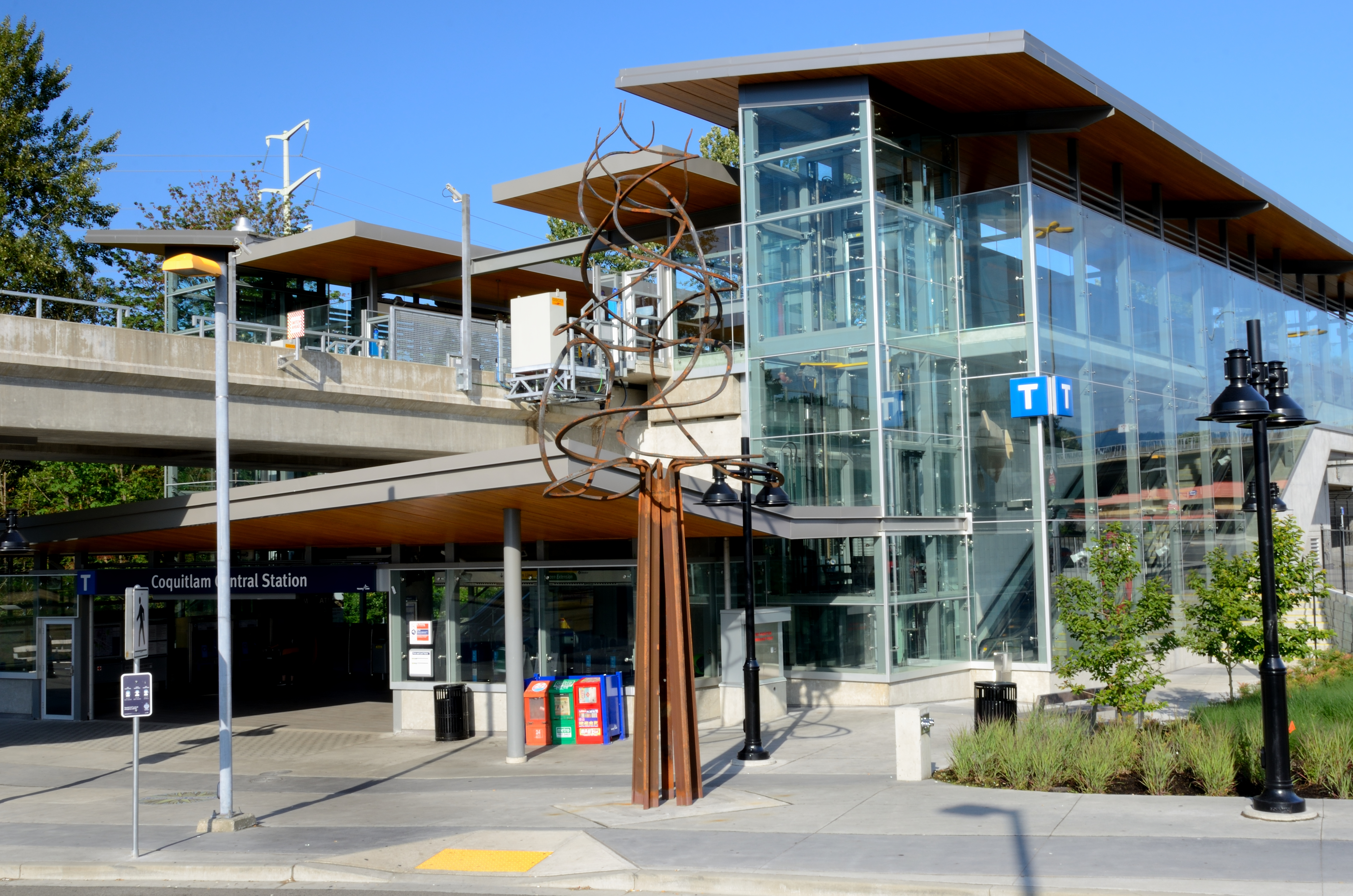

General information
- Location: 2920 Barnet Highway, Coquitlam; Canada
- Coordinates: 49°16′26″N 122°48′00″W
- System: TransLink station
- Owner: TransLink
- Operator: Coast Mountain Bus Company and TransLink
- Line: Canadian Pacific Railway
- Platforms: 1 side platform (West Coast Express); 2 side platforms (SkyTrain)
- Tracks: 2 (Canadian Pacific Railway); 2 (SkyTrain)
- Connections: R3 Lougheed Hwy

Construction
- Structure type: At grade (West Coast Express); Elevated (SkyTrain)
- Parking: 601 spaces
- Cycle facilities: lockers

Other information
- Fare zone: 3

History
- Opened: November 1, 1995 (West Coast Express); December 2, 2016 (SkyTrain)

Passengers
- 2025: 1,595,000 ▼1.1%
- Rank: 32 of 54

Services
Preceding station	TransLink	Following station
Inlet Centre towards VCC–Clark	Millennium Line	Lincoln towards Lafarge Lake–Douglas
Moody Centre towards Waterfront	West Coast Express	Port Coquitlam towards Mission City
Location

Coquitlam Central station is an intermodal rapid transit station in Metro Vancouver served by both the Millennium Line—part of the SkyTrain system—and the region's West Coast Express commuter rail system. The station is located on the north side of the Canadian Pacific Railway (CPR) tracks in Coquitlam, just west of the Lougheed Highway rail overpass, near the Coquitlam Centre shopping mall. 601 parking spaces are available on site. All services are operated by TransLink.

On December 2, 2016, the Millennium Line's Evergreen Extension entered revenue service at the station, providing service to VCC–Clark in Vancouver and Lafarge Lake–Douglas in Coquitlam.

== History ==
The Canadian Pacific Railway brought the first passenger train service to the area in the 1880s, with the first permanent station built at Fraser Mills in 1910, on the branch line to New Westminster. The train was a vital factor in bringing new settlement, including loggers and their families, into the Coquitlam area.

The area around Coquitlam Central station has been an important focal point for bus services since August 15, 1979, when bus services were rerouted to serve Coquitlam Centre shopping mall. During this period, buses converged along Pinetree Way north of the intersection of Lougheed and Barnet Highway. On September 2, 1991, a new bus exchange known as "Coquitlam Centre Transit Exchange" opened on the southwest corner of the intersection, in roughly the same location as the current exchange, which was rebuilt during construction of the adjacent West Coast Express station. Before the Evergreen Extension was opened, the bus exchange was known as "Coquitlam Station".

The train station opened in 1995, when the West Coast Express began operating, connecting Vancouver with Mission. The West Coast Express platform is located on the south side of the CPR tracks, accessed via a pedestrian tunnel.

== Services ==
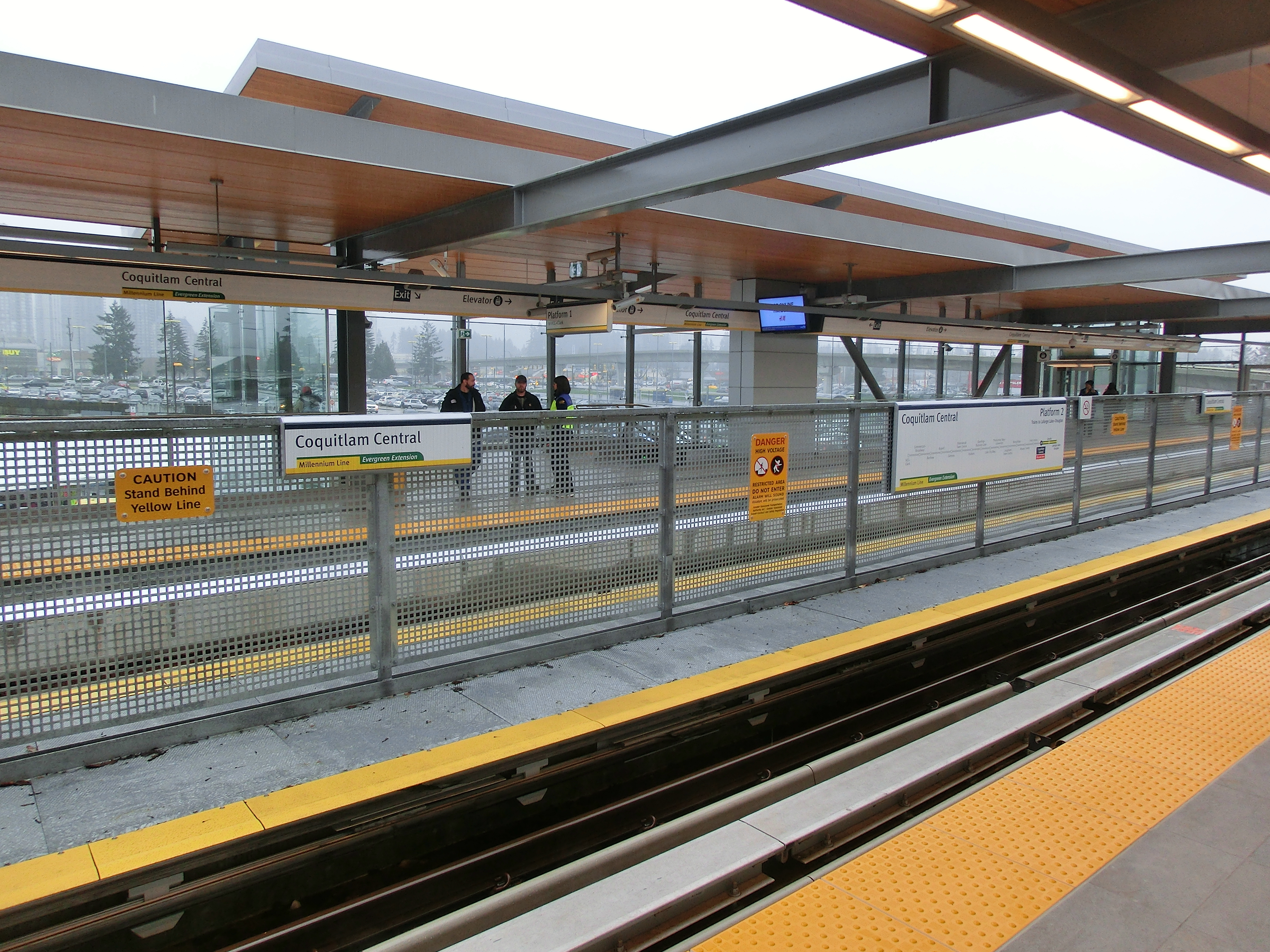
SkyTrain platforms at Coquitlam Central station

=== West Coast Express ===
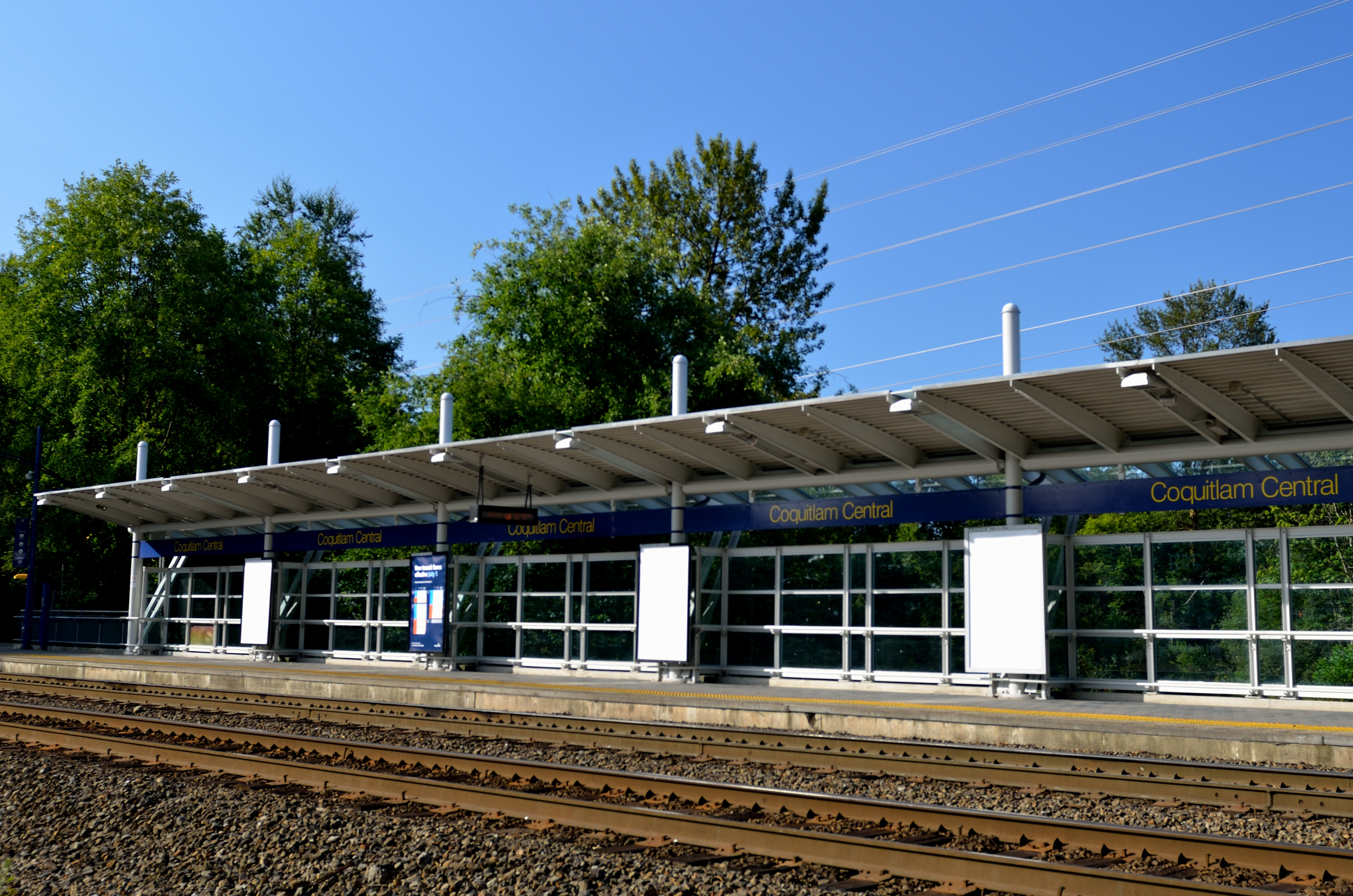
West Coast Express station platform

Coquitlam Central is served by five West Coast Express trains per weekday in each direction: five in the morning to Vancouver, and five in the evening to Mission. In addition, there are select 701 trips arriving from Mission City in the morning, and select 701 trips operating to Mission City station in the evening. The station is adjacent to a major bus exchange and park-and-ride facility, which is served by local and express buses and Community Shuttle minibuses.

=== SkyTrain ===
Revenue service began at Coquitlam Central station on December 2, 2016. It provides services to nearby Lafarge Lake–Douglas station in Coquitlam and service to VCC–Clark station in Vancouver. Coquitlam Central station is a major bus transfer exchange. There is a track spur near the platform for a potential future extension to Port Coquitlam.

=== Transit exchange ===
Coquitlam Central station provides a bus exchange near the intersection of Lougheed Highway and Barnet Highway. Bus bay assignments are as follows:

Bay	Route	Notes
1	159 Braid Station	
1	160 Port Coquitlam Station	
2	160 Kootenay Loop	
3	151 Burquitlam Station	
4	186 Hampton Park	
4	186 Panorama	Peak hour service only
4	189 Lafarge Park	
5	183 Moody Centre Station	
6	701 Haney Place / Maple Ridge East / Mission City Station	Weekdays only for Mission City Station
6	N9 Downtown	NightBus service
7	R3 Lougheed Hwy to Haney Place	RapidBus service
8	188 Port Coquitlam Station	
9
9	185 Lansdowne	
9	187 Panorama	Peak hour service only
9	187 Parkway	
10	152 Lougheed Station	
11	169 Braid Station	
11	191 Princeton	
12	150 White Pine Beach Special	May to September seasonal service only
12	153 Braid Station	
12	175 Meridian	Peak hour service only
12	179 Buntzen Lake Special	July to September seasonal service only
13	171 Fremont	
13	172 Riverside	
14	173 Cedar	
14	174 Rocklin	
