= Kootenay Loop =

Public transit exchange in Vancouver, Canada

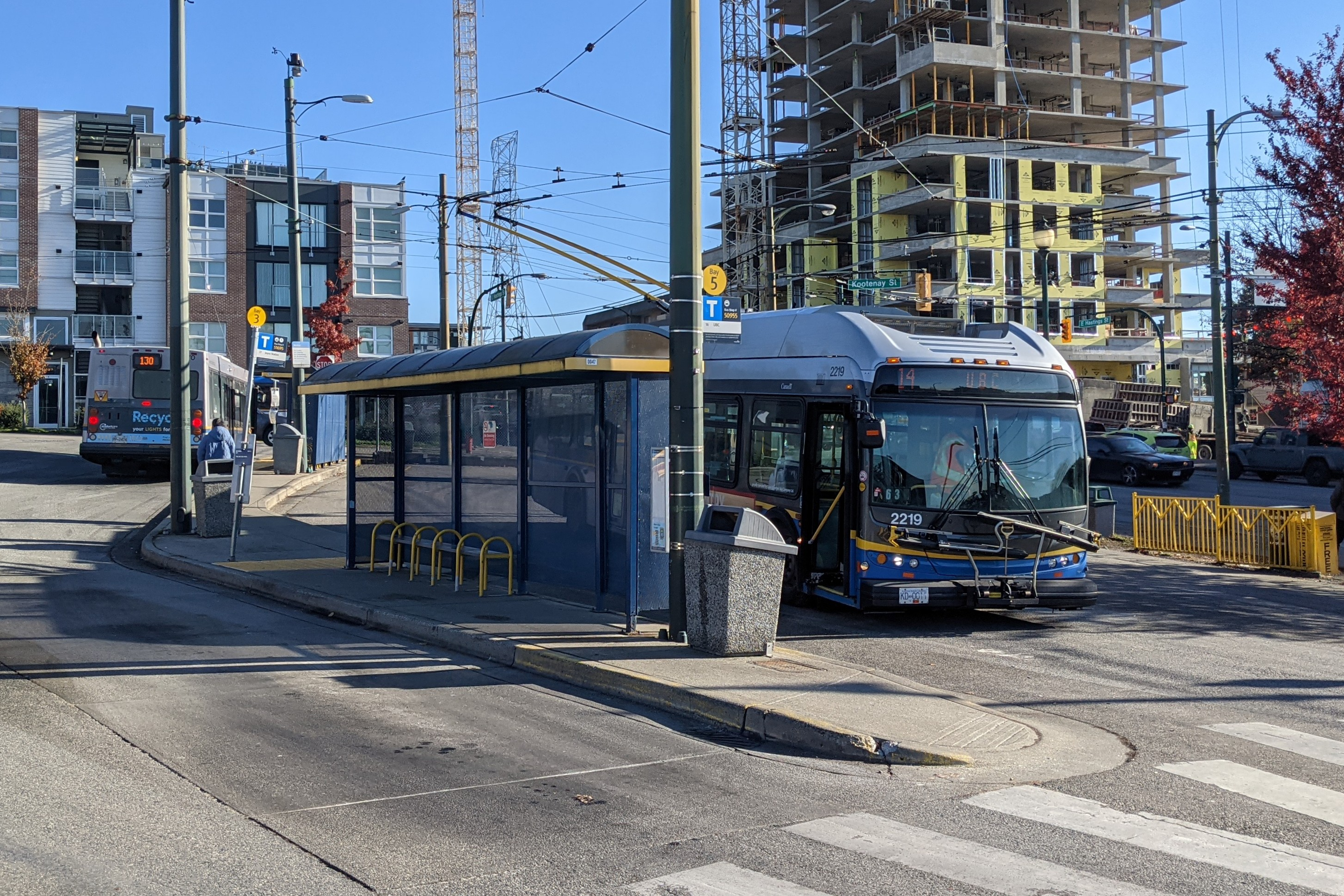
- Route 14 trolley bus on layover

General information
- Location: Kootenay St at E Hastings St; Vancouver, British Columbia; Canada
- Coordinates: 49°16′53″N 123°01′35″W
- Operator: TransLink
- Bus routes: 9
- Bus stands: 10
- Bus operators: Coast Mountain Bus Company
- Connections: R2 Marine–Willingdon; R5 Hastings St

Other information
- Fare zone: 1

History
- Opened: August 20, 1950; 76 years ago
Location

Kootenay Loop is a transit exchange in Vancouver, British Columbia, Canada. It is the easternmost major transit exchange in the city of Vancouver, with routes serving Vancouver, Burnaby, North Vancouver and the Tri-Cities.

== Structure and location ==
Kootenay Loop opened on August 20, 1950, and is located on East Hastings Street at its intersection with Kootenay Street. It is less than 100 metres (330 ft) from Vancouver's border with the city of Burnaby. It is near the Pacific National Exhibition grounds and the Second Narrows Bridge to North Vancouver. It is located just northwest of the Burnaby Transit Centre bus depot.

The exchange can handle regular-length diesel buses, articulated buses and electric trolley buses. Part of the exchange is on Hastings Street itself, with the other section (used by the trolley buses) is separated from regular traffic. It is also one of the power stations for the trolleys.

Kootenay Loop used to be a streetcar turnaround as there was no service into Burnaby after 1949. There was a small cafe in the centre until the mid-1950s.

== Routes ==
As of September 2026, the following routes serve Kootenay Loop:

Bay	Location	Routes	Notes
1	Bus loop	160 Kootenay Loop	Unloading only
2	Bus loop	160 Port Coquitlam Station	
3	Bus loop	27 Joyce Station	
4	Bus loop	130 Kootenay Loop	Unloading only
5	Bus loop	14 UBC	Evening trips do not operate to or from Kootenay Loop.
6	Hastings Street; Westbound	28 Phibbs Exchange	
6	Hastings Street; Westbound	130 Phibbs Exchange	No late evening service to Phibbs Exchange; trips operate to and from Metrotown station only.
7	Hastings Street; Westbound	R2 Marine–Willingdon to Park Royal	RapidBus service
7	Hastings Street; Westbound	R5 Hastings St to Burrard station	RapidBus service
7	Hastings Street; Westbound	N35 Downtown	NightBus service
8	Hastings Street; Eastbound	R2 Marine–Willingdon to Metrotown station	RapidBus service
8	Hastings Street; Eastbound	28 Joyce Station	
8	Hastings Street; Eastbound	130 Metrotown Station	
8	Hastings Street; Eastbound	N35 SFU	NightBus service
9	Hastings Street; Eastbound	R5 Hastings St to SFU	RapidBus service
10	Kootenay Street; Northbound	131 Hastings at Gilmore	

== See also ==
- List of bus routes in Metro Vancouver
