= Evergreen Extension =

2016 extension of Metro Vancouver's SkyTrain Millennium Line

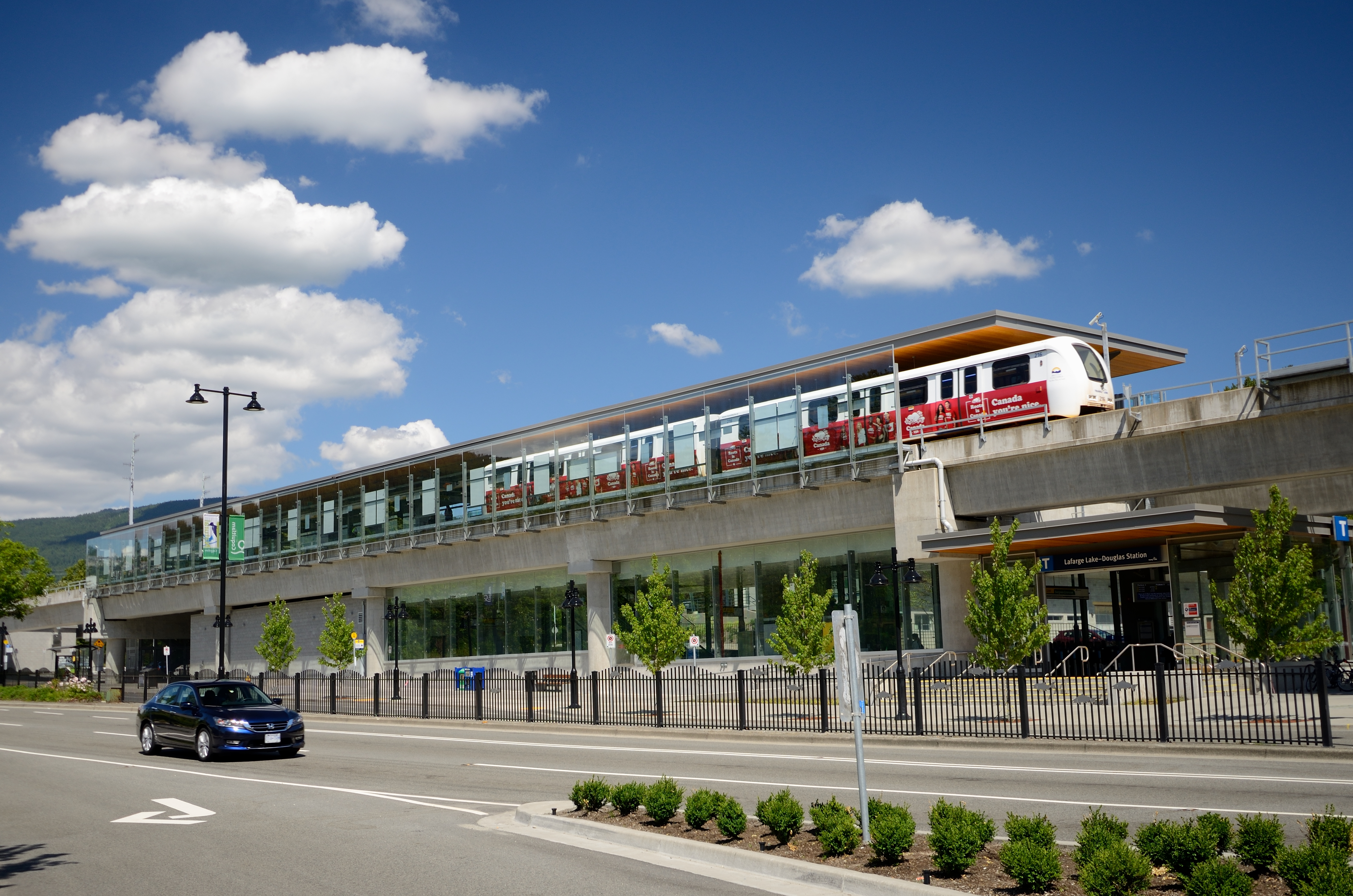
- Lafarge Lake–Douglas station in Coquitlam

Overview
- Other name: Evergreen Line (planning)
- Owner: TransLink
- Locale: Metro Vancouver, British Columbia
- Stations: 6

Service
- Type: Rapid transit extension
- System: SkyTrain (Millennium Line)
- Operator: British Columbia Rapid Transit Company
- Daily ridership: 39,500 (September 2019)

History
- Opened: December 2, 2016

Technical
- Line length: 10.9 km (6.8 mi)
- Number of tracks: 2
- Track gauge: 1,435 mm (4 ft 8 1/2 in) standard gauge
- Electrification: Four rail system (Linear motor)
- Operating speed: 80 km/h (50 mph)

The Evergreen Extension (previously known as the Evergreen Line) is a 10.9-kilometre-long (6.8 mi) extension of the Millennium Line of Metro Vancouver's SkyTrain rapid transit system. The extension runs from Lougheed Town Centre in Burnaby to Lafarge Lake–Douglas in Coquitlam and included six new SkyTrain stations and an upgraded existing station (Lougheed Town Centre) on the Millennium Line. It began operations on December 2, 2016.

Since the extension opened, the Millennium Line has operated between VCC–Clark and Lafarge Lake–Douglas. In 2012, the Evergreen extension was expected to see 50,000 riders daily in its first year of operation, rising to 70,000 passengers per day by 2021. Actual usage, however, has consistently been lower than this, with 30,000 trips taken on an average weekday in January 2017, rising to almost 40,000 trips per day in 2019, before usage dropped sharply as a result of the COVID-19 pandemic.

== History ==
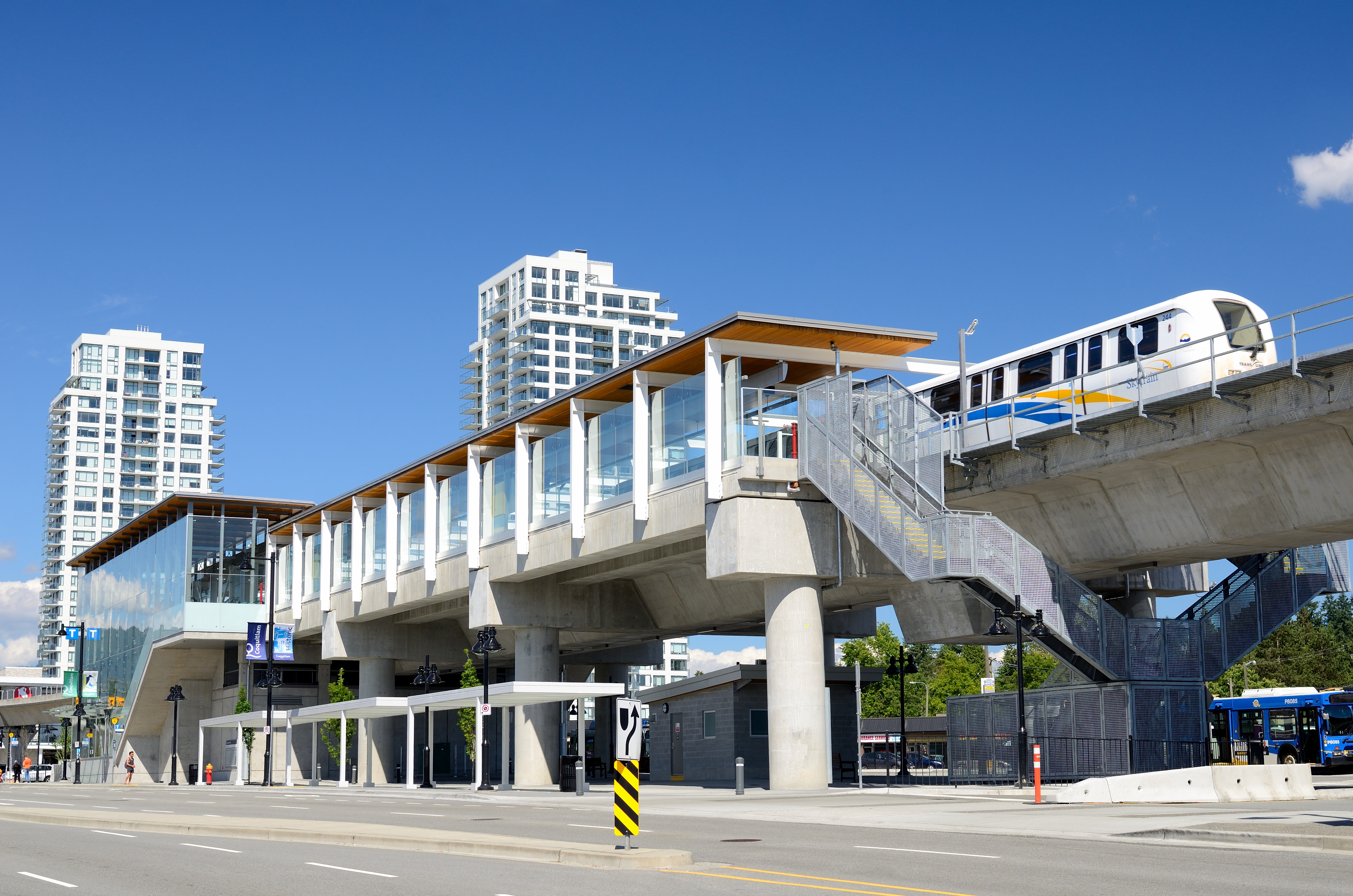
Burquitlam station in Coquitlam

A rapid transit extension to Coquitlam was intended to be phase 2 of the new Millennium Line that was completed in 2002. As the costs of the project rose, however, plans to extend the line into Coquitlam were cancelled, though not before a third incomplete concrete platform on the westbound side of the Lougheed Town Centre station was built, with a spur of tracks for a potential extension.

After completion of the Millennium Line, TransLink undertook several studies regarding the fate of the extension, considering a variety of possible options, including a diesel multiple unit-based railway, a light rail transit line, a new SkyTrain line, and an express bus service. In September 2002, the 97 B-Line express bus service was launched. In 2004, it was decided that a light rail line was the best option, as it would better blend in with the neighbourhood, cost less, better fit ridership patterns, and not compete with customers from the existing West Coast Express.

Detailed design began in October 2006, when the TransLink Board approved the Evergreen Light Rail Transit (LRT) project definition phase. Despite a series of public consultations held during this period, in a community update issued May 2007, TransLink summarized the state of the project as follows:

Work continues to resolve several outstanding issues before the project proceeds. Until there is project certainty, the planned consultation process in support of detailed design, the planned submission of the Application for an Environmental Assessment Certificate and the anticipated start date of the project construction are delayed.

This statement prompted local news agencies to assume TransLink had shelved the project. TransLink responded by issuing a subsequent statement on July 19: "The Light Rail Transit system for the Northeast Sector is the number one rapid transit priority for TransLink", TransLink Chair Malcolm Brodie said. "We have defined the project, and now we are waiting for funding to be confirmed from senior levels of government."

Evergreen Line logo used during the planning stage

On February 1, 2008, the provincial government and TransLink unveiled a revised business case for the Evergreen Extension, preferring the Advanced Light Rapid Transit (ALRT) used by SkyTrain over the light rail technology that had been proposed. The expected completion date was pushed back from 2011 to 2014. On April 18, 2008, the Transport Ministry and TransLink announced that of the two routes proposed in the business case, the North West route was selected after consultation with the various municipalities. On August 5, 2008, the provincial government and TransLink agreed on Evergreen Line delivery. On May 4, 2009, the Ministry of Transportation released a Project Description Report for the Evergreen Line. The report provided more information about the scope and characteristics of the proposed line and detailed the project's environmental and socio-economic requirements.

On September 3, 2009, the release of the report on TransLink's 2010 ten-year plan by Martin Crilly, the Regional Transportation Commissioner appointed by the provincial government, indicated that rapid transit expansion, which included the Evergreen Line, was highly unlikely without a predictable source of operational funding. Although he stopped short of offering his opinion on the project, he agreed nonetheless with TransLink that upgrades to the existing system should be prioritized before the construction of the Evergreen Line.

Later that month, the second project update was released by the Evergreen Line Project. The update stated that contractor selection would begin in early to mid-2010, environmental assessment would be completed in 2010, and construction would proceed in late 2010. The update also announced open houses for the environmental assessment process for September 2009 and open houses for preliminary design in October and November 2009. It did not make reference to the funding issues that remained unresolved at the time.

On October 26, 2009, the TransLink Mayors' Council voted against the increased funding necessary to pursue the Evergreen Line, instead voting for keeping existing services as they are. However, on October 28, 2009, Premier Gordon Campbell stated that the project would continue even though it had been voted down.

On October 7, 2011, the Mayors' Council approved the "Moving Forward" 2012 Supplemental Plan to fund various transportation projects in the Metro Vancouver region, including the Evergreen Line. Funding would be provided in part by a two-cents-per-litre increase in the Metro Vancouver fuel tax that was to be implemented in April 2012, with further funding from new sources that had yet to be determined. Of the projected $1.4 billion cost for the Evergreen Line, TransLink would provide $400 million, the provincial government would contribute $583 million, and the federal government would contribute $417 million. Transportation Minister Blair Lekstrom announced that construction was expected to begin in mid-2012, soon after a winning bid for construction had been chosen from three shortlisted builders.

On January 25, 2012, the provincial government announced that pre-construction work would proceed on the line.

In May 2012, preliminary construction began, including the removal of some buildings and the construction of underground utility tunnels in certain areas of Port Moody and Coquitlam. At the same time, the province also awarded contracts to widen sections of North Road that were to be affected by construction of the line in the middle of the year.

On July 19, 2012, the Government of Canada, the City of Coquitlam, and Coquitlam Centre Mall reached an agreement to add Lincoln station to the Evergreen Line project with the federal government contributing $7 million to the public–private partnership that built the station.

On October 4, 2012, SNC-Lavalin was chosen as the primary contractor to construct the Evergreen Line.

On December 3, 2012, the provincial government and TransLink signed a contract with Bombardier Transportation to supply 28 SkyTrain cars.

On December 8, 2012, the final early works contract for the Evergreen Line was awarded and was to be completed by March 2013. The statement also promised that the project was still on track for completion in 2016.

On February 5, 2013, Thales Canada announced that it had been awarded a contract by Partnerships BC to install the company's SelTrac communications-based train control (CBTC).

Construction along North Road in Burnaby and Coquitlam, in March 2014

On March 23, 2013, the final names of the Evergreen Line stations were announced. It was also announced that construction of the Evergreen Line guideway would start in the Burquitlam area of Coquitlam in mid-2013 and continue south to Lougheed Town Centre station. The stations were to be built in the following order:

- Inlet Centre station, including utility work;
- Moody Centre station, including utility work and relocation of the railway in the area;
- Lincoln station, Burquitlam station, and Lougheed Town Centre station (beginning in mid-2013); and
- Coquitlam Central station and Lafarge Lake–Douglas station (beginning in late 2013).

In October 2014, the elevated guideway section between Lougheed Town Centre station to the South Tunnel Portal was completed. The launching truss was transported to Coquitlam Central station, where crews continued to build the elevated guideway north to Lafarge Lake–Douglas station.

On February 13, 2015, the provincial government announced that the opening of the line would be delayed until late 2016, due to a slower-than-expected tunnel boring process. Any costs associated with the delay would come at no cost to the taxpayers and would instead be covered by the contractor.

In June 2015, the project management team announced that they would begin testing trains between Lougheed station and Burquitlam station in July 2015. In the week of July 6, 2015, testing began.

On November 27, 2015, the provincial government announced that the opening of the line would be further delayed until early 2017.

As of April 2016, the project was 85% complete, including trackwork in elevated and at-grade guideways, guideway construction, tunnel boring, tunnel base, station buildings, and testing between Lougheed and Burquitlam station.

On September 8, 2016, it was announced that the line would be opening before the end of 2016 but that a concrete date had yet to be set. It was also announced that the line would be referred to as the Evergreen Extension instead of the Evergreen Line.

On October 22, 2016, Expo Line and Millennium Line route changes took effect to accommodate the Evergreen Extension. The changes, announced on September 19, 2016, were implemented ahead of the Evergreen Extension opening to familiarize riders with the new operating pattern.

On November 7, 2016, TransLink announced that the extension would open on December 2, 2016.

== Project funding ==
Funding for the project was provided from four major groups:

- Government of British Columbia: $586 million
- Government of Canada: $424 million
- TransLink: $400 million
- City of Coquitlam and Coquitlam Centre: $21 million

== Route description ==
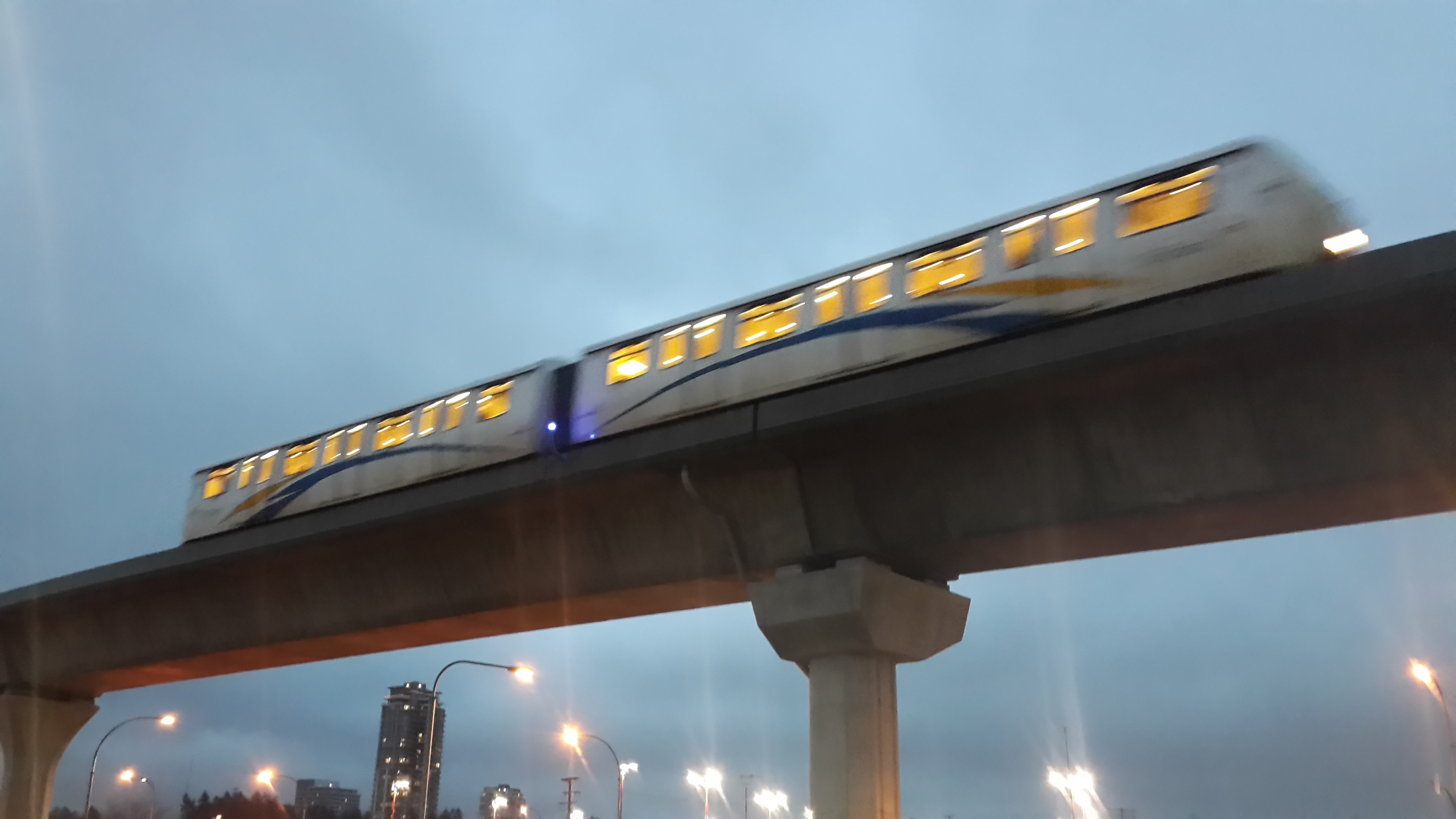
A train running on the Evergreen Extension

The July 2012 project update gave the following description of the alignment:

Burquitlam
The Evergreen Line will run north from Lougheed Town Centre Station on an elevated guideway along the centre of North Road. Burquitlam Station will be on the east side of Clarke Road near Burquitlam Plaza. Leaving Burquitlam Station, the line will cross to the west side of Clarke Road, before entering a tunnel towards Port Moody.

Port Moody
The Evergreen Extension will emerge from the tunnel just east of Barnet Highway. It will travel at ground level along the south side of the Canadian Pacific Rail (CPR) tracks to Moody Centre Station (with a connection to the West Coast Express), located at the Port Moody transit exchange site. Continuing east, the line will cross the CPR tracks just before Inlet Centre Station, located north of Barnet Highway.

Coquitlam
The line will continue along the north side of the CPR tracks towards Coquitlam Central Station, located at the Coquitlam transit exchange site. Turning north, the line will run on an elevated guideway along the west side of Pinetree Way to Lincoln Station. It will then cross to the east side near Northern Avenue, before ending at Lafarge Lake–Douglas Station, north of Guildford Way.

From the line's opening until June 24, 2018, trains ran in the direction of left-hand traffic instead of the standard right-hand traffic between Burquitlam and Lougheed Town Centre, and used two switches just south of Burquitlam station to return to normal travelling direction. Normal right-hand running between those two stations commenced on June 25, 2018, in order to reduce delays.

== Design ==
The May 2009 Project Description Report and September 2009 Project Update provided previously unconfirmed details about the Evergreen Line, including the following:

- Travel time from Coquitlam City Centre to Lougheed Town Centre would be 15 minutes.
- Service would be every three minutes during peak hours.
- Operating hours would be approximately 20 hours per day on weekdays, and less on weekends.
- The line would provide direct connections, without transfers, to what [was then] the Millennium Line.
- Projected ridership was 70,000 per day in 2021.
- Peak hour system capacity would be 10,400 passengers in 2021.
- Operations would be integrated with the existing SkyTrain facility near Edmonds station on the Expo Line.

The LRT-based plan foresaw eleven stations. As part of the decision to use ALRT technology, four planned stations were cut: Cameron, Buller, Lansdowne, and Coquitlam Civic Centre.

=== Stations ===
Six new stations were confirmed for the opening of the Evergreen Extension:

- Burquitlam station, on the east side of Clarke Road near Burquitlam Plaza
- Moody Centre station, at the Port Moody transit exchange site
- Inlet Centre station, north of Barnet Highway, on the north side of the CPR tracks
- Coquitlam Central station, at the Coquitlam transit exchange site
- Lincoln station, on the northeast corner of Coquitlam Centre
- Lafarge Lake–Douglas station, east side of Pinetree Way and north of Guildford Way

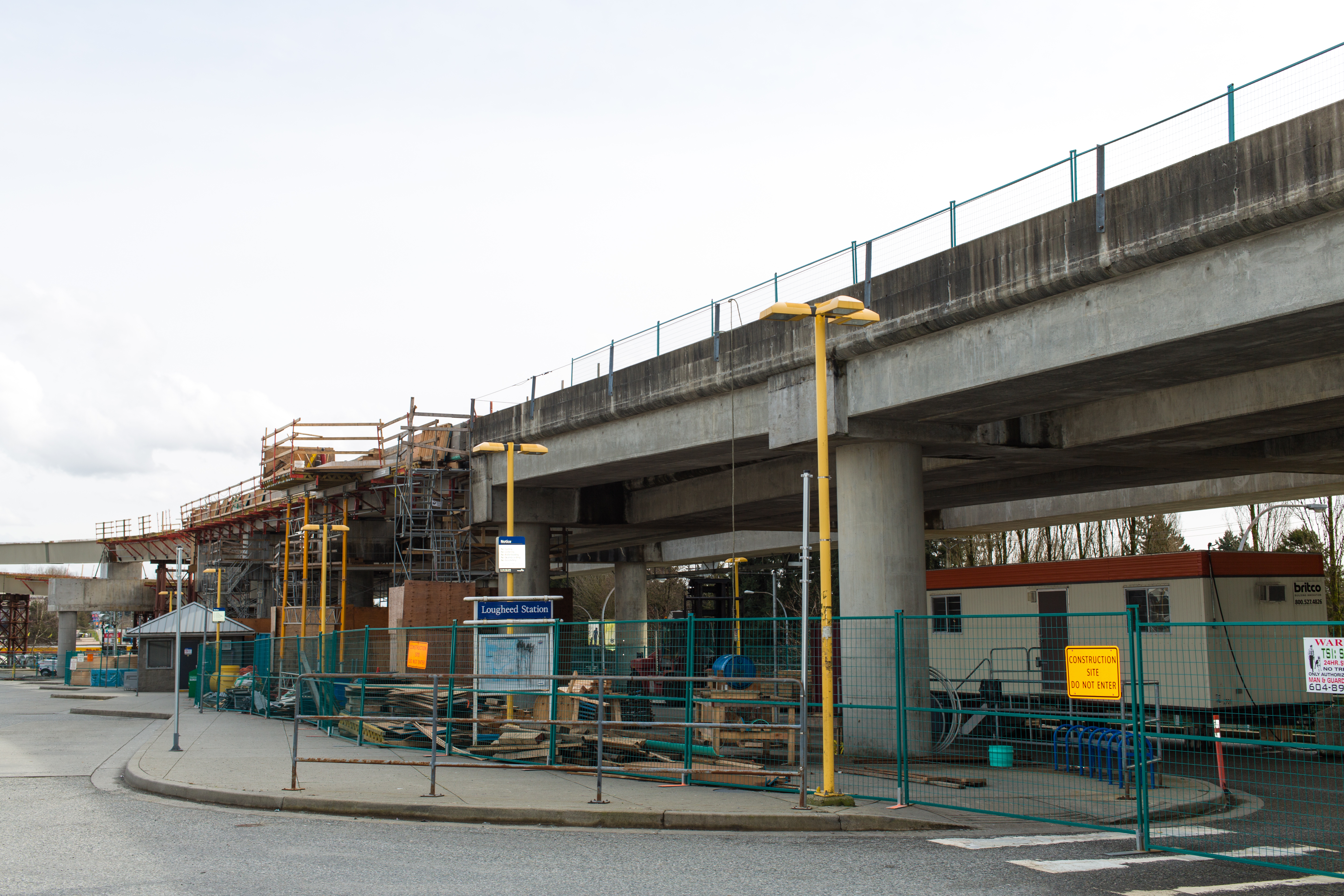
Construction at Lougheed Town Centre station in March 2014

Two existing SkyTrain stations were upgraded to serve the Evergreen Extension:

- Lougheed Town Centre station—An additional platform was constructed on the northeast side of the station, completing a roughed-in platform and track that were constructed previously in anticipation of the Evergreen Extension. This northeast platform (Platform 3) was originally used for eastbound trains travelling to Lafarge Lake–Douglas. The southwest centre platform (Platforms 1 & 2) served the Lougheed branch of the Expo Line (Platform 2 westbound to Production Way–University and Platform 1 eastbound to Braid), as well as westbound Millennium Line trains to VCC–Clark (Platform 2), allowing for cross-platform transfers between those services.
- Commercial–Broadway station—Increased ridership was expected to lead to larger transfer volumes at Commercial–Broadway station in Vancouver, already the busiest public transit hub in Metro Vancouver. As a result, as part of the Expo Line Upgrade Strategy, Commercial–Broadway station received major upgrades to platforms and passageways to facilitate larger volumes of passengers. An additional side platform for passengers exiting Waterfront-bound trains (using a partial Spanish solution approach) was constructed, which saw the remodelling of the Safeway grocery store directly east of the station. This new platform was designed to relieve crowding on existing Platforms 3 and 4. Also included in the plan was a new pedestrian overpass over Broadway and a widened bridge above the Grandview Cut to the Millennium Line platforms.

The design blueprints showed allowances for two future stations, at Queens Street in Port Moody and Falcon Drive in Coquitlam, should future development warrant their construction, according to the Evergreen Line project office. Also in the design plans was a short spur at Coquitlam Central station, added to allow for a possible future extension of the line to Port Coquitlam.
