= Port Coquitlam station =

Metro Vancouver commuter rail station

Port Coquitlam
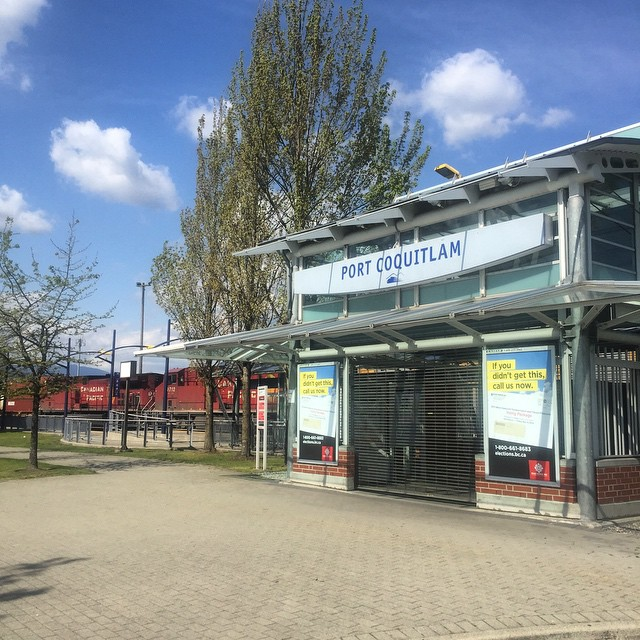

General information
- Location: 2125 Kingsway, Port Coquitlam; Canada
- Coordinates: 49°15′41″N 122°46′26″W
- System: West Coast Express station
- Owner: BC Transit, TransLink
- Line: Canadian Pacific Railway
- Platforms: 1 side platform
- Tracks: 2
- Connections: TransLink

Construction
- Structure type: At-grade
- Parking: 280 spaces, plus overflow
- Cycle facilities: lockers

Other information
- Fare zone: 3

History
- Opened: 1995

Passengers
- 2019: 257,800 ▲1.6%
- Rank: 4 of 8

Services
Preceding station	TransLink	Following station
Coquitlam Central towards Waterfront	West Coast Express	Pitt Meadows towards Mission City
Location

Port Coquitlam is a station on the West Coast Express commuter rail line connecting Vancouver to Mission, British Columbia, Canada. The station is located on the south side of the Canadian Pacific Railway (CPR) tracks in Port Coquitlam, just off Kingsway Avenue. The station opened in 1995, when the West Coast Express began operating. 280 park and ride spaces are available. All services are operated by TransLink.

== Services ==
Port Coquitlam is served by five West Coast Express trains per day in each direction: five in the morning to Vancouver, and five in the evening to Mission. The station is adjacent to a bus loop and park-and-ride facility, which are served by the local bus and Community Shuttle minibus services.

== Bus routes ==
Port Coquitlam railway station provides bus connections within the city of Port Coquitlam and to the cities of Vancouver and Coquitlam. Bus bay assignments are as follows:

Bay	Route number	Destination
1	173	Coquitlam Central Station
1	174	Coquitlam Central Station
1	175	Coquitlam Central Station; Peak hours only
2	173	Cedar
2	174	Rocklin
2	175	Meridian; Peak hours only
3	170	Port Coquitlam South
4	160	Kootenay Loop
5	188	Coquitlam Central Station
6	159	Braid Station
6	159	Coquitlam Central Station
