= Carvolth Exchange =

Transit exchange in British Columbia, Canada

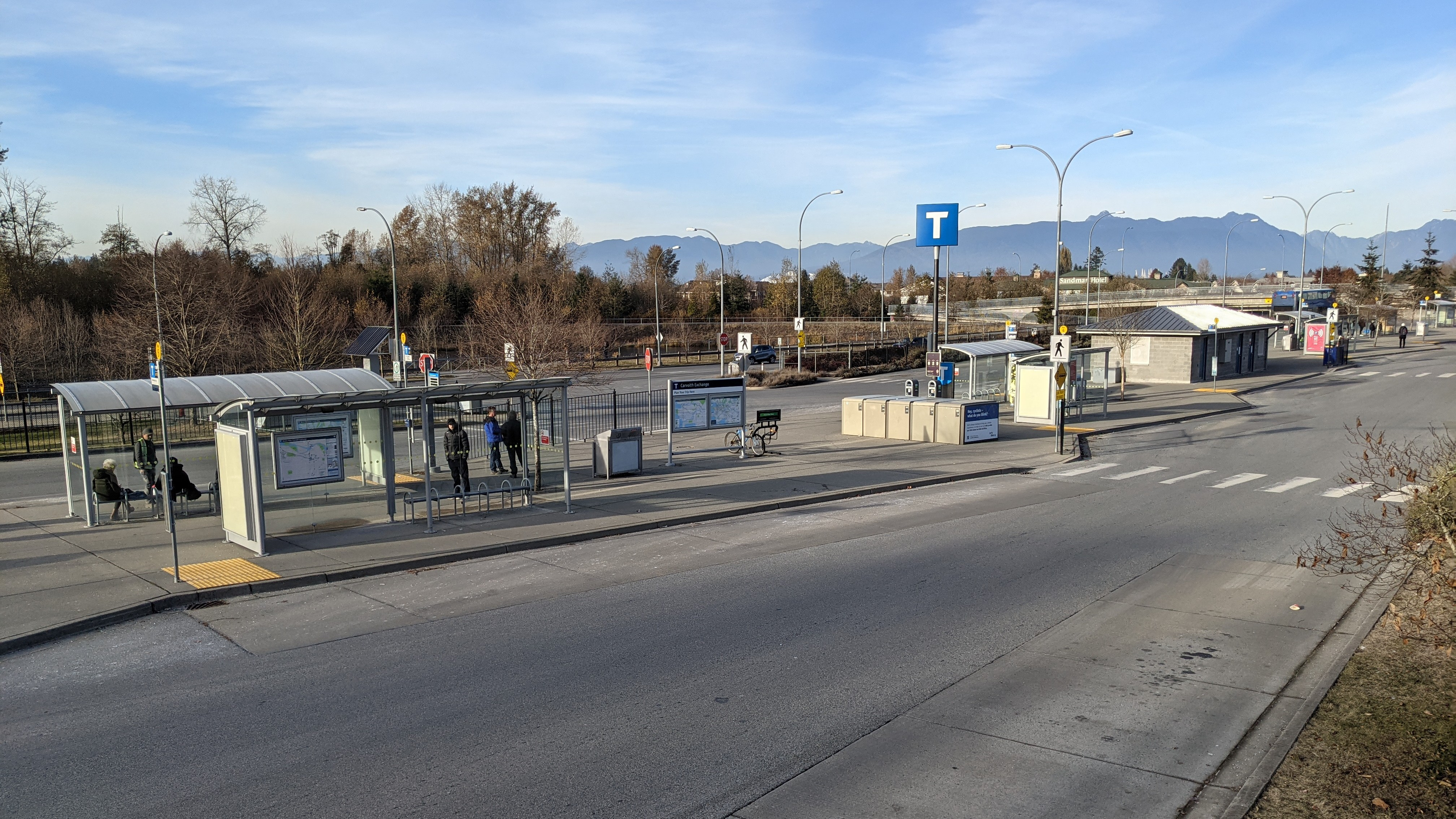
- Looking northwest at Carvolth Exchange

General information
- Location: 202 Street and 86 Avenue; Langley, British Columbia, Canada
- Coordinates: 49°09′35″N 122°39′34″W
- Owner: TransLink
- Bus routes: 7
- Bus stands: 14
- Bus operators: Chilliwack Transit System; Coast Mountain Bus Company
- Connections: BC Transit: 66 Fraser Valley Express

Construction
- Parking: 679

Other information
- Fare zone: 3

History
- Opened: December 1, 2012; 13 years ago
Location

Carvolth Exchange is a transit exchange and park and ride facility serving northwestern Langley Township, British Columbia, Canada. TransLink is the primary operator of the exchange, with routes to Surrey City Centre, New Westminster, Burnaby, Maple Ridge and Langley City, which provide connections to SkyTrain and the West Coast Express rail services for travel towards Vancouver. A single BC Transit express route also serves the exchange, providing service to Burnaby, Abbotsford, and Chilliwack.

== History ==
The exchange opened on December 1, 2012, coinciding with the opening of the second Port Mann Bridge. Prior to opening, the area was served by the Walnut Grove Park and Ride.

On April 6, 2015, the Chilliwack Transit System began operating the 66 Fraser Valley Express for BC Transit with service to Abbotsford and Chilliwack. Carvolth Exchange served as the western terminus of this route until March 27, 2022, when service was further extended west to Lougheed Town Centre station in Burnaby.

== Routes ==
As of January 2019, the following routes serve Carvolth Exchange:

Bay	Route	Destination	Notes
1	–	Unloading only	
2	509	Walnut Grove	Express; peak hours only.
3	501	Langley Centre	
4	501	Surrey Central Station	
5	–	Unloading only	
6	595	Maple Meadows Station	
7	388	22nd Street Station	Peak hours only
8	509	Surrey Central Station	Express; peak hours only.
9	555	Port Mann Express: Lougheed Station	Express; highway coach.
10	–	Spare	
11	562	Langley Centre	
12	595	Langley Centre	
13	66	Fraser Valley Express: to Chilliwack and Lougheed Station	BC Transit route operated by the Chilliwack Transit System connecting to Abbotsford, Chilliwack and Lougheed Town Centre station in Burnaby. Separate fare required.
14	–	HandyDART	

== See also ==
- List of bus routes in Metro Vancouver
