= Central Fraser Valley Transit System =

Public transit system in British Columbia

- Service type: bus service, paratransit
- Alliance: BC Transit
- Routes: 23
- Fleet: 66
- Operator: FirstCanada
- Website: bctransit.com/central-fraser-valley

Central Fraser Valley Transit System (formerly known as ValleyMAX) is a public transit system which provides bus services in the Central Fraser Valley area of British Columbia, Canada. Funding for the system is provided by the City of Abbotsford, the District of Mission, the University of the Fraser Valley and BC Transit, the agency responsible for planning and management of municipal transit systems throughout the province. Other than planning and managing bus routes, The Central Fraser Valley Transit System contracts out most of its bus services to FirstCanada ULC.

== Services ==
Most bus routes run entirely within the urban areas of either Abbotsford or Mission, with the GoLines providing the backbone of the system with transfer-free crosstown service in Abbotsford. The Valley Connector routes link the two communities via the Abbotsford-Mission Highway across the Fraser River. To provide a balanced service, routes are intensified through central Abbotsford, while smaller buses operate on some routes as a flexible "community bus" during off peak hours. Regular service on busy routes is between 6 am and 10:30/11 pm.

In March 2022 BC Transit extended their Fraser Valley Express (FVX) route 66 between Chilliwack and Langley via Abbotsford to terminate at Lougheed Town Centre station in Burnaby giving travellers from the Fraser Valley region a much easier connection to Metro Vancouver via a direct transfer to the Skytrain.

handyDART is a transportation service for people with disabilities that do not allow them to use the conventional transit service. Clients must be pre-approved to make use of this service.

== Regular routes ==
| No. | Name | Municipality | Notes |
|---|---|---|---|
| 1 | Highstreet/UFV | Abbotsford | |
| 2 | Highstreet/McMillan | Abbotsford | |
| 3 | Clearbrook/Huntingdon | Abbotsford | |
| 4 | Saddle/Montrose | Abbotsford | |
| 5 | Clearbrook/Bourquin via Hospital | Abbotsford | |
| 6 | Gladwin | Abbotsford | |
| 7 | Sumas Mountain | Abbotsford | |
| 7A | Sumas Mountain | Abbotsford | |
| 9 | McKee/Montrose | Abbotsford | |
| 12 | UFV - Bourquin Commuter | Abbotsford | Weekday rush service only. |
| 15 | Auguston Connector | Abbotsford | No Sunday service. |
| 16 | McMillan Commuter | Abbotsford | Weekday rush service only. |
| 17 | Townline Industrial | Abbotsford | No weekend service. |
| 21 | Aldergrove Connector | Abbotsford, Langley | Connects to TransLink's 503 route. Weekday rush service only to Abbotsford International Airport. |
| 21A | Aldergrove Connector | Abbotsford, Langley | No weekend service. |
| 22 | East Townline | Abbotsford | Weekday rush service only. |
| 24 | Centre Loop | Abbotsford | Weekday rush service only. |
| 26 | Sandy Hill/Bourquin | Abbotsford | Weekday rush service only. |
| 31 | Valley Connector | Abbotsford, Mission | Travels via the Abbotsford-Mission Highway. |
| 31A | Valley Connector | Abbotsford, Mission | Travels via the Abbotsford-Mission Highway. |
| 31X | Valley Connector | Abbotsford, Mission | Travels via the Abbotsford-Mission Highway. And there is no weekend service. |
| 32 | West Heights | Mission | |
| 33 | Cedar Valley | Mission | |
| 34 | East Side | Mission | |
| 35 | Hatzic | Mission | |
| 39 | Shopper Shuttle | Mission | |
| 66 | Fraser Valley Express | Chilliwack, Abbotsford, Langley, Burnaby | Express, Limited Weekend Service. Operated by Chilliwack Transit. Connection available to SkyTrain |

== West Coast Express ==
Central Fraser Valley Transit provides connecting services to the West Coast Express, which terminates at Mission City Station. This commuter rail service runs to Vancouver in the morning, with return trips in the afternoon and early evening.
