= 97 B-Line =

Express bus service in Metro Vancouver, Canada

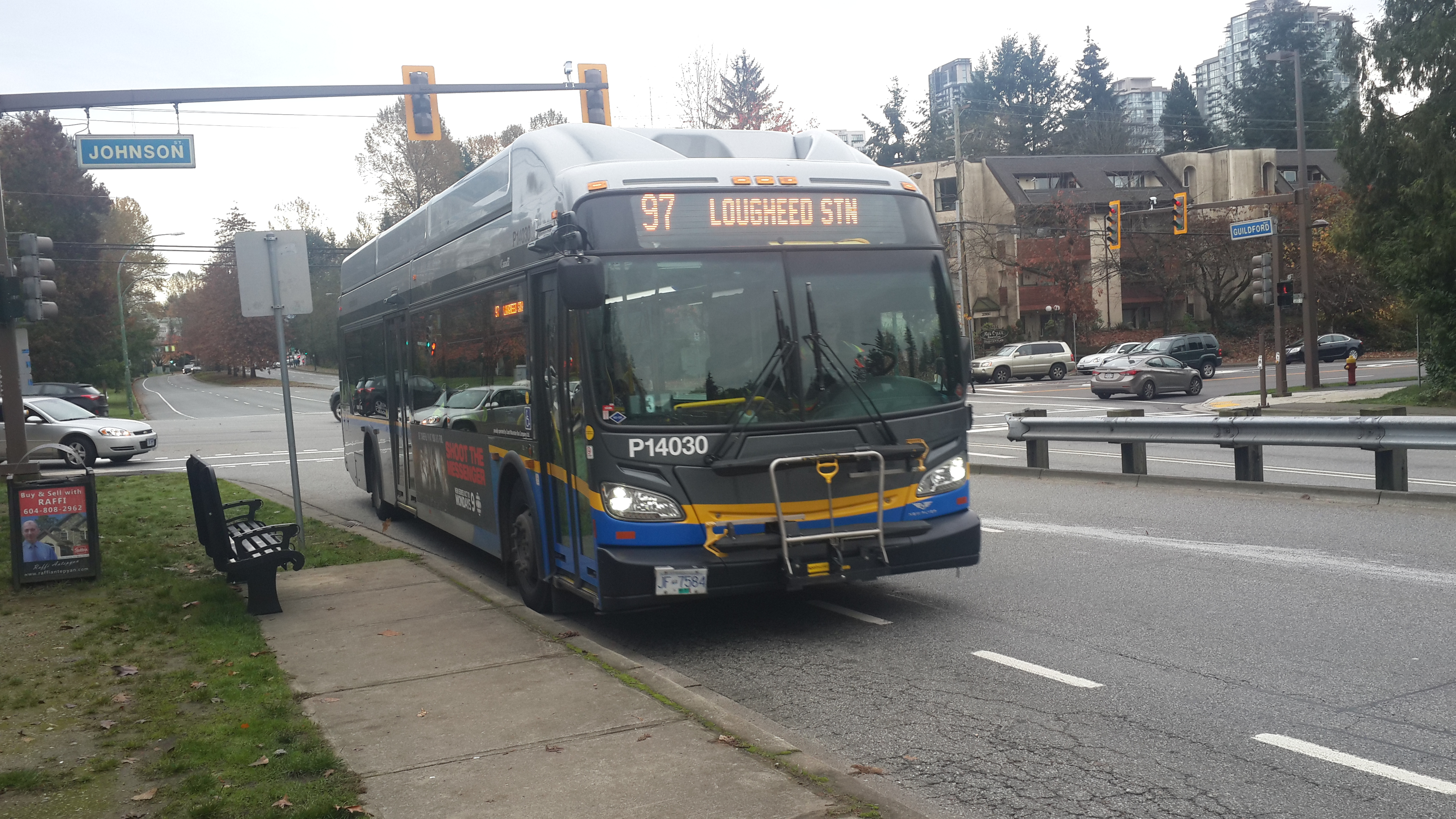

Overview
- System: TransLink
- Operator: Coast Mountain Bus Company
- Began service: September 2, 2002
- Ended service: December 18, 2016

Route
- Start: Lougheed Town Centre
- End: Coquitlam Central
- Length: 12 km (7.5 mi)
- Stops: 19

Service
- Ridership: 10,750 (avg. weekday)

The 97 B-Line was an express bus line in Metro Vancouver, British Columbia, Canada. It connected Coquitlam Central station on the West Coast Express system to Lougheed Town Centre station on the SkyTrain system. It was operated by Coast Mountain Bus Company and funded by TransLink. Going west, the route went along Clarke Rd., St. John's St., Ioco Rd, Guildford Way and Pinetree Way, and served Burnaby, Port Moody, and Coquitlam. The 97 B-Line was discontinued on December 18, 2016, as part of the December 2016 TransLink seasonal bus service changes, many resulting from the opening of the Evergreen Extension of the Millennium Line. The line carried 10,750 passengers on weekdays in 2011.

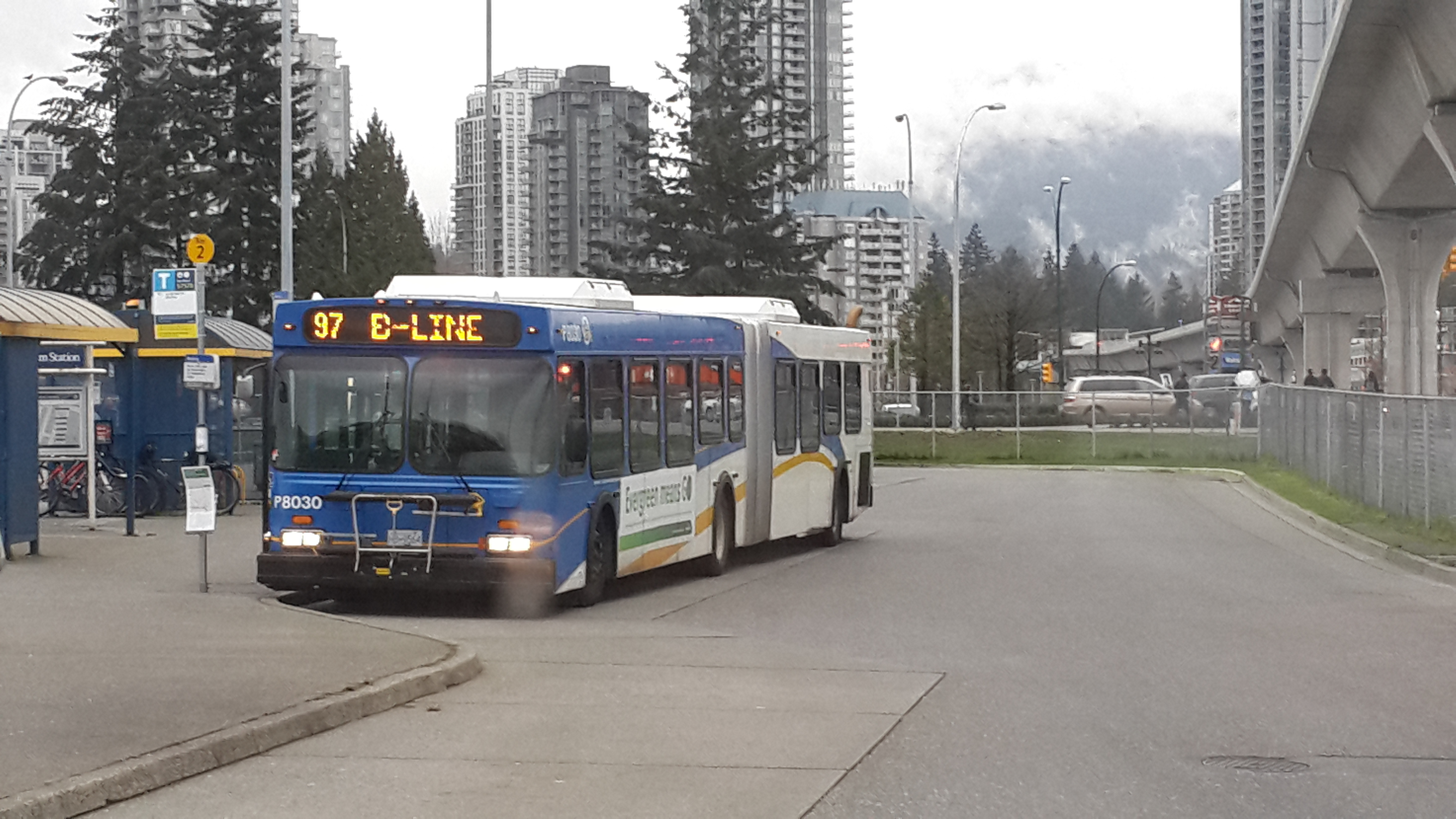

Unlike the other B-Line services, this route mainly used conventional 12.2-metre (40 ft) buses with no special paint scheme, instead of the 18.3-metre (60 ft) articulated buses. It took 45 minutes to complete during rush hour, and about 30 minutes off-peak.

== 97 B-Line stops and transfer points ==
=== Burquitlam stops ===
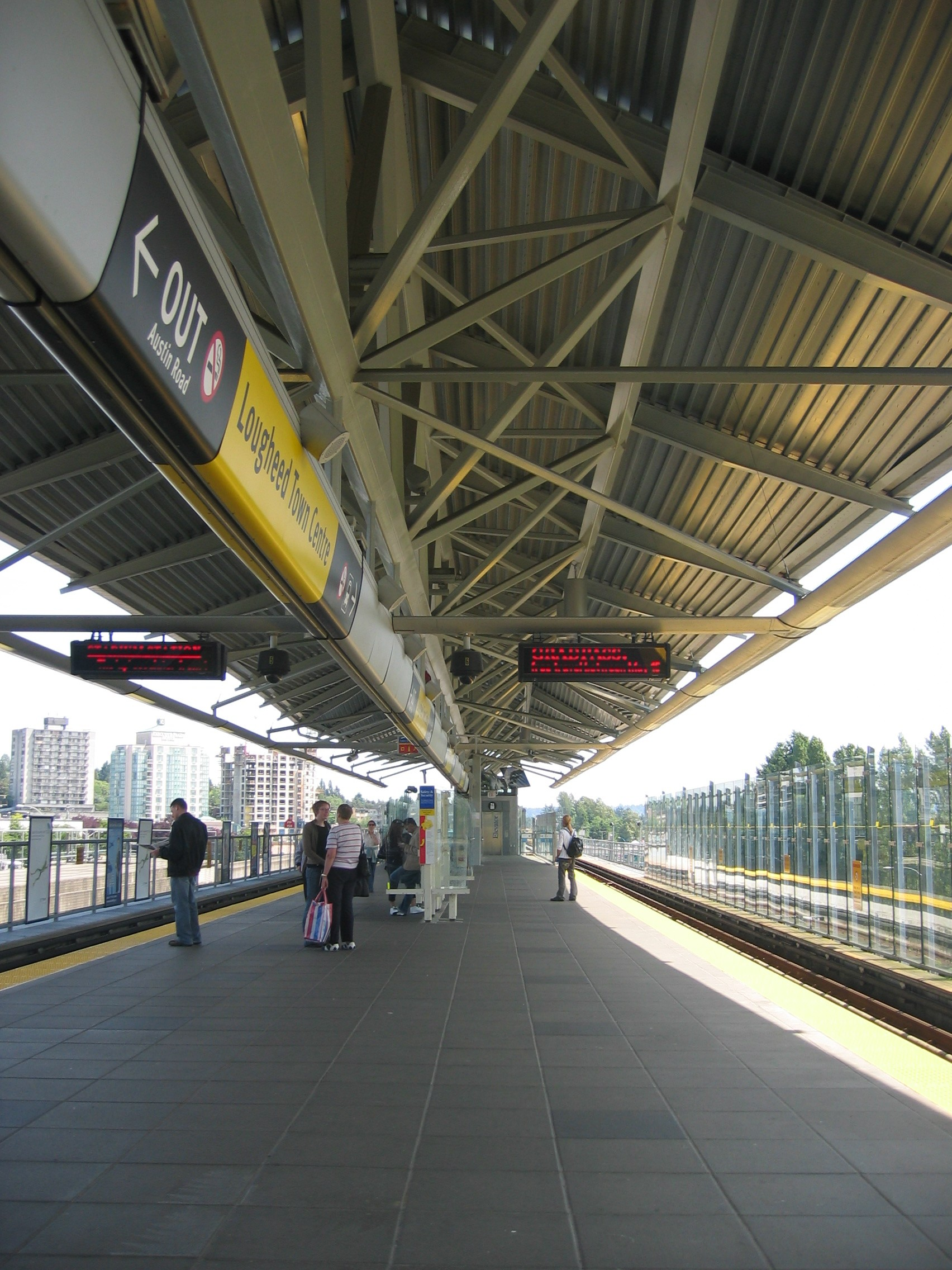
Lougheed Town Centre station

- Lougheed Town Centre station (Note: This stop is located on North Road, the street separating Burnaby and Coquitlam.) – connected to the SkyTrain system and also served the Lougheed Town Centre shopping mall and the standing stones.
- Lougheed Mall / Austin – an alternate stop for the Lougheed Town Centre mall.
- Cameron – served the Sullivan Heights neighbourhood in Burnaby.
- Foster – alternate stop for Sullivan Heights.
- 500 Block / Smith – served the Plaza Burquitlam shopping area.
- Como Lake – alternate stop for the Plaza Burquitlam.

=== Port Moody stops ===
- Glenayre – served the Glenayre and Seaview neighbourhoods of Port Moody, with connections to a local community shuttle.
- Barnet Highway / Albert – served the East Hill neighbourhood.
- Queens – served the northwestern part of the Harbour Chines neighbourhood and the Port Moody Station Museum.
- Williams – served the now-closed Port Moody station of the West Coast Express and northern Harbour Chines.
- Moray – served the industrial areas in southeast Port Moody.
- Newport – served the Port Moody City Hall, the local theatre and library, NewPort Village, Suter Brook, and the Heritage Mountain Shoppers Village strip-mall.
- Ungless – served Eagle Ridge Hospital.

=== Coquitlam stops ===
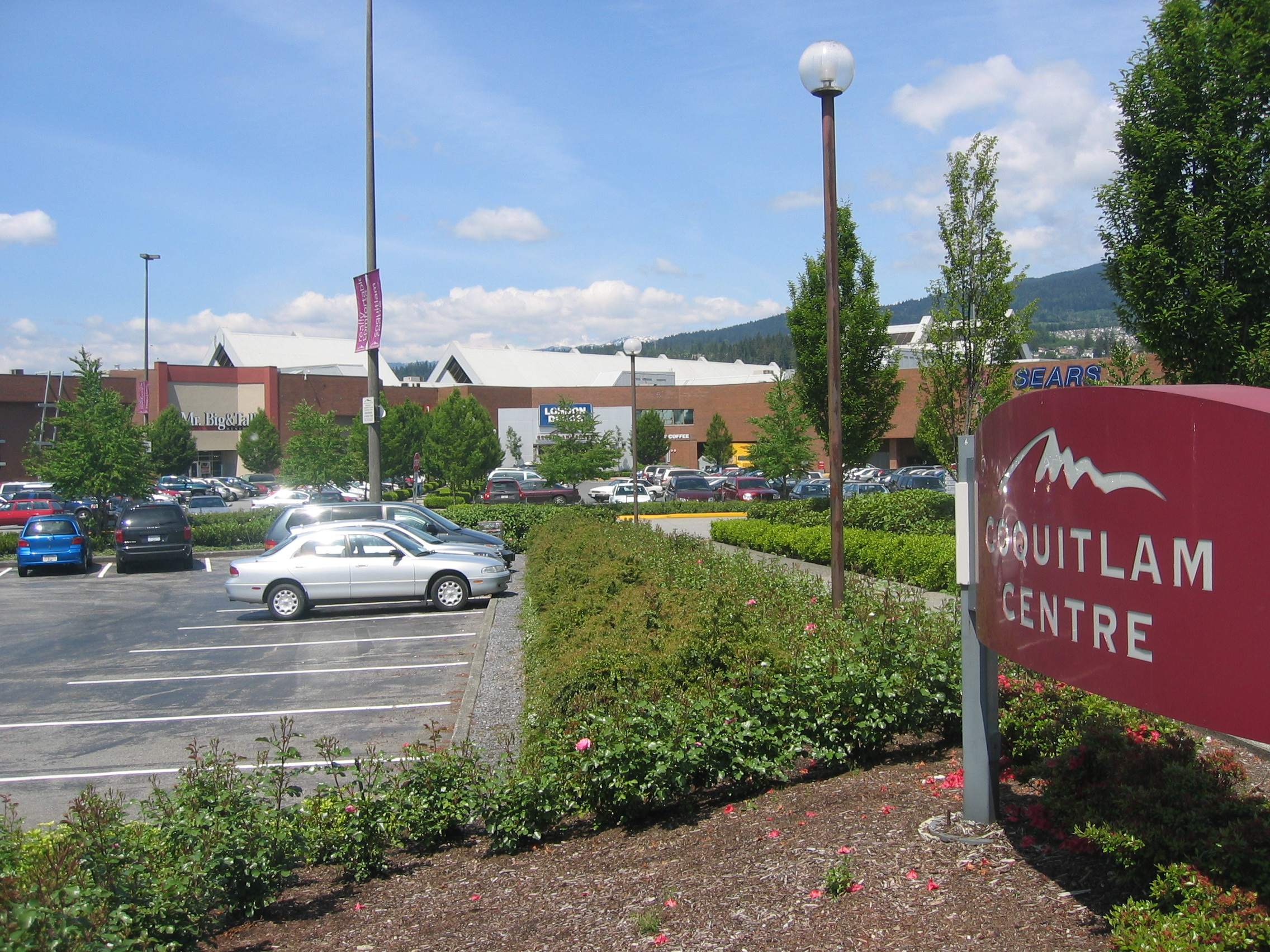
Coquitlam Centre

- Falcon – served the Eagle Ridge neighbourhood around the Coquitlam/Port Moody border.
- Lansdowne – served the Eagle Ridge and Highland Park neighbourhoods.
- Johnson – served the Canyon Springs neighbourhood.
- Pinetree / Guildford – served the Coquitlam City Hall area and Douglas College's David Lam campus.
- Lincoln / Anson – first stop for the Coquitlam Centre shopping mall; also served Henderson Place Mall and the Westwood neighbourhood.
- Coquitlam Central station – connected to the West Coast Express's Coquitlam Station and the Coquitlam Centre mall; also served Westwood Mall and Pinetree Village.

== See also ==
- R1 King George Blvd
- R4 41st Ave
- R5 Hastings St
- 98 B-Line
- 99 B-Line
- List of bus routes in Metro Vancouver
