= Coast Mountain Bus Company =

Bus transit services operator in Metro Vancouver

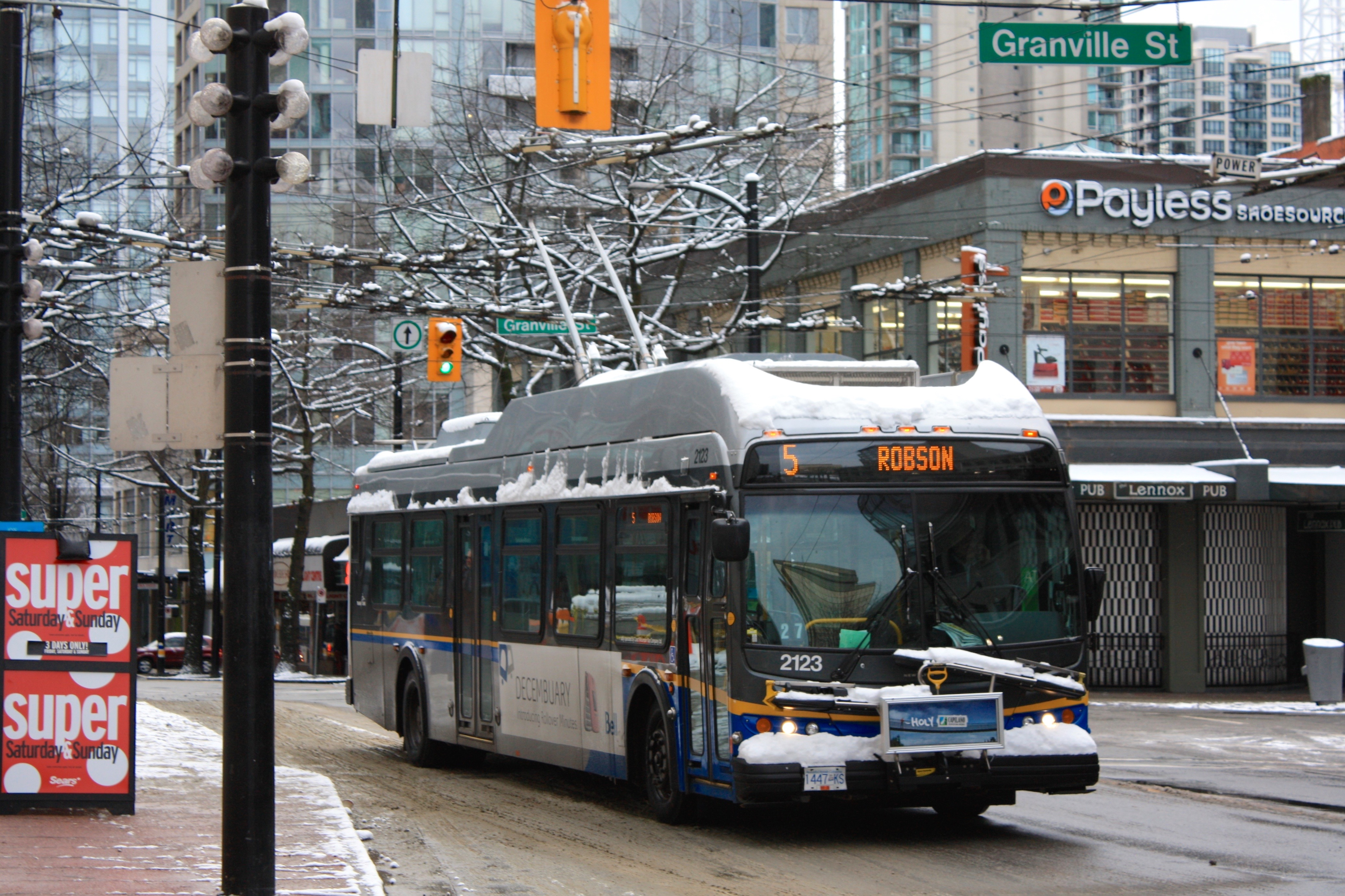
- A CMBC trolleybus at Granville & Robson in Downtown Vancouver
- Parent: TransLink
- Founded: April 1, 1999; 27 years ago
- Headquarters: 700 – 287 Nelson's Court; New Westminster, BC
- Service area: Metro Vancouver, British Columbia, Canada
- Service type: Transit bus, express bus, trolley bus, express coach, shuttle bus, passenger ferry
- Routes: 220 (bus); 1 (ferry)
- Hubs: 6 transit centres
- Fleet: Bus: 1,677; Ferry: 4
- Daily ridership: 730,000
- Chief executive: Michael McDaniel (president & general manager)
- Website: coastmountainbus.com

Coast Mountain Bus Company (CMBC) is the contract operator for bus transit services in Metro Vancouver and is a wholly owned subsidiary of the South Coast British Columbia Transportation Authority, known locally as TransLink, the entity responsible for public transit in the region. The buses form part of the integrated transit network of the Lower Mainland.

== History ==
The Coast Mountain Bus Company was created on April 1, 1999, concurrent with the implementation of TransLink. Bus service in Metro Vancouver was formerly provided by BC Transit, the provincial government crown corporation that operates transit outside of Metro Vancouver.

== Services ==
Coast Mountain Bus Company operates the buses throughout Greater Vancouver, except for some routes in West Vancouver, which are run by its own municipal transit system. One contract operator provides select Community Shuttle service, and another contract operator provides HandyDART services:

- 220 bus routes in total

This includes:

- Regular transit service
- School specials
- Express coach service to/from suburban municipalities
- Trolley bus service – 13 routes primarily in the City of Vancouver
- NightBus – special late-night routes that generally start service at approximately 1 am
- B-Line express bus (1 route)
- RapidBus express bus (6 routes)
- Community shuttles – routes operating minibuses that connect to the larger ones
- SeaBus – passenger ferry across the Burrard Inlet

The regional transit network including bus routes, service levels and fares are set by TransLink.

=== B-Line ===
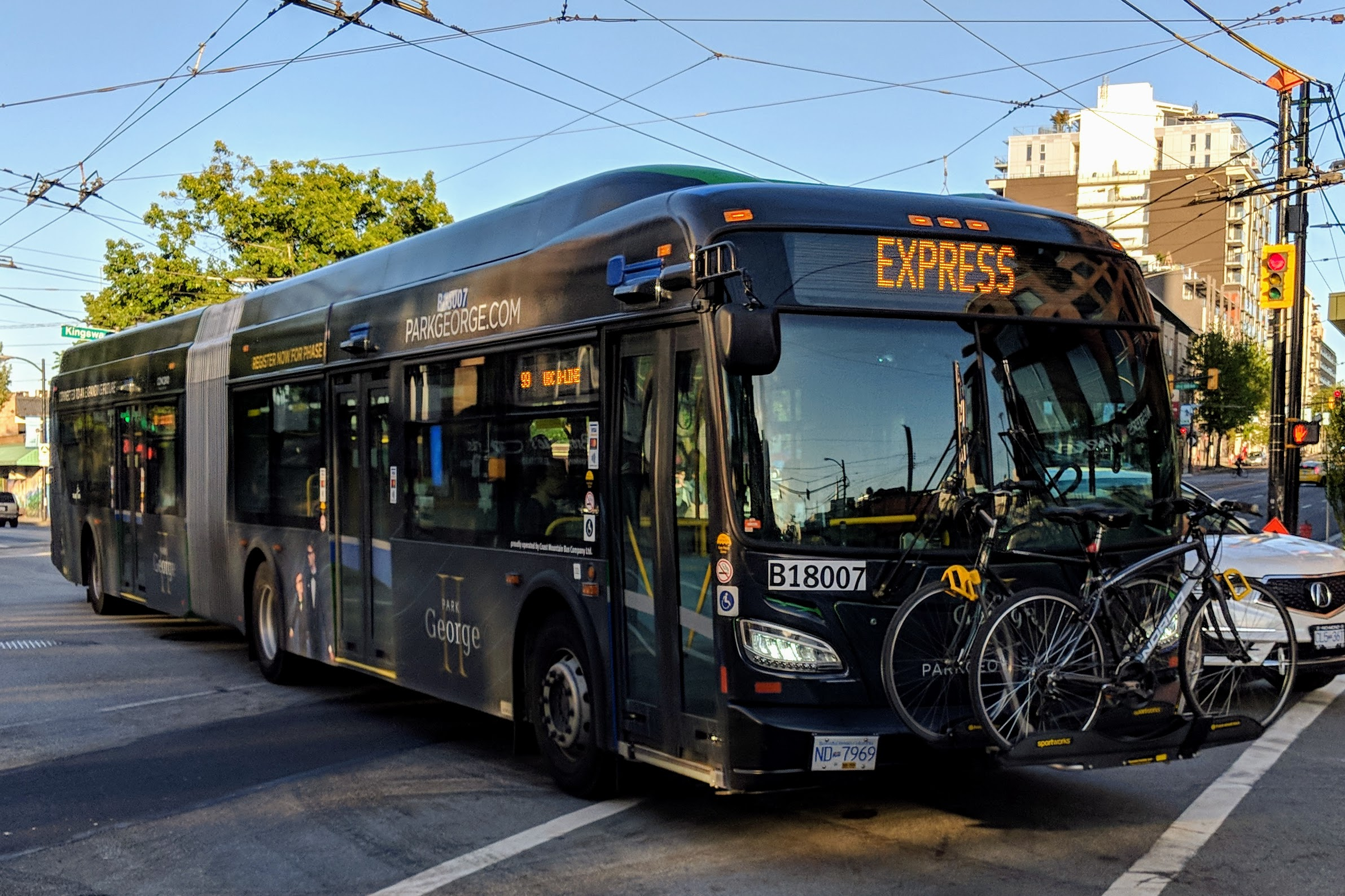
The 99 B-Line is the busiest bus route in North America, with an average weekday ridership of 56,000 passengers as of 2016.

B-Lines are a type of express bus route with bus rapid transit elements using mostly 60-foot (18 m) low-floor articulated buses. All B-Line routes currently in operation feature all-door boarding as of January 1, 2018.

One route is currently in operation:

- 99 B-Line: Broadway between UBC Exchange and Commercial–Broadway station, via Broadway–City Hall station

Four routes no longer operate:

- 95 B-Line: Waterfront station to Simon Fraser University's Burnaby campus. This service was rebranded as the R5 Hastings St RapidBus.
- 96 B-Line: From Newton Exchange to Guildford Mall. This service was rebranded as the R1 King George Blvd RapidBus.
- 97 B-Line: From Coquitlam Central station to Lougheed Town Centre station. It was replaced by the Millennium Line's Evergreen Extension.
- 98 B-Line: Granville Street and No. 3 Road between Burrard station and Richmond Centre. It was replaced by the Canada Line.

=== RapidBus ===
On January 6, 2020, two of the existing B-Line routes (the 95 and the 96) were rebranded as RapidBus routes (routes R5 and R1 respectively), and the following routes began service:

- R3 Lougheed Hwy: Lougheed Highway between Coquitlam Central station in Coquitlam and Haney Place Exchange in Maple Ridge. It complements the existing 701 route servicing local stops.
- R4 41st Ave: 41st Avenue between UBC Exchange and Joyce–Collingwood station, entirely within Vancouver. It replaced the 43 Express.

A fifth RapidBus was introduced on April 6, 2020:

- R2 Marine–Willingdon: Marine Drive, 3rd Street and Main Street between Park Royal Exchange in West Vancouver and Phibbs Exchange in North Vancouver, replacing the 239. The R2 was later extended along Willingdon Avenue to Metrotown station in Burnaby on September 7, 2026.

On January 2, 2024, a sixth RapidBus was added:

- R6 Scott Rd: Scott Road station to Newton Exchange within Surrey

== Fare Paid Zones ==
A Fare Paid Zone is a clearly marked territory on which passengers must have valid proof of payment and present it for inspection upon request of a transit employee. Initially, these were only in effect in SkyTrain and SeaBus stations and vehicles until June 25, 2007, when the law was changed. Now, all buses, including West Vancouver Blue Buses, are designated Fare Paid Zones. The reason for implementing Fare Paid Zones on buses was to remove the responsibility of fare enforcement from bus drivers, as too many of them were being assaulted in disputes over fare payment. Fare enforcement on all buses are now the responsibility of the Transit Police and Transit Security Department. Officers may board a bus at any time and conduct a fare inspection. Those who fail to pay the fare and retain proof of payment could be removed from the bus and/or fined $173.

== Facilities ==
=== Current facilities ===
- Burnaby Transit Centre: Located at 3855 Kitchener Street, Burnaby, it was built in 1986. This transit centre is split into two facilities (north and south,) separated by Kitchener Street. Serving the North Shore, parts of Burnaby and Vancouver, Burnaby Transit Centre is also home to many support services such as Environmental Services, Trolley Overhead, Facilities Maintenance, Fire Prevention, and Non-Revenue Vehicle Maintenance. Beginning in September 2016, North Shore transit routes operate out of this transit centre. Fleet Overhaul at this location is where the majority of body repair and repainting is carried out, as well as engine and component overhaul, while minor repair is most likely carried out at the bus's home garage.
- Hamilton Transit Centre: Located at 4111 Boundary Road, Richmond, this facility opened in September 2016, and took over operations of various South Delta, Richmond, Burnaby and New Westminster routes. It is the second transit centre to have abilities to house CNG buses.
- Port Coquitlam Transit Centre: Located at 2061 Kingsway Avenue, Port Coquitlam, it opened in August 1978. It was the first garage to support Compressed Natural Gas (CNG) vehicles. Serves the Tri-Cities, New Westminster, Maple Ridge and Pitt Meadows areas.
- Richmond Transit Centre: Located at 11133 Coppersmith Way, Richmond, it opened on September 4, 2000. It is the main base for the suburban routes served by Orion V highway coaches and local routes in Richmond, White Rock, Delta, and some Burnaby, Surrey and Vancouver routes.
- Surrey Transit Centre: Located at 7740 132nd Street, Surrey, it opened in May 1975. It is the base for most Surrey, Langley, and North Delta services and some White Rock and Ladner services. As of May 2018, it is the third transit centre to have abilities to house CNG buses.
- Vancouver Transit Centre: Located at 9149 Hudson Street, Vancouver, it opened on September 2, 2006. It is the garage for Vancouver bus services. This garage serves the trolley routes, as well as most of Vancouver's buses.

=== Former facilities ===
- North Vancouver Transit Centre (1946–2016): This depot, built in 1945, was located at 536 East 3rd Street, North Vancouver. It was the base for most North Shore services not operated by West Vancouver Municipal Transit. It closed in September 2016, and all North Vancouver routes now operate from Burnaby Transit Centre.
- Oakridge Transit Centre (1948–2016): Located at 949 West 41st Avenue, it opened in 1948. Oakridge was to be decommissioned and likely sold for re-development beginning in 2007. However, with the arrival of several New Flyer and Nova Bus orders starting in 2006, it remained an active support facility, conducting retrofitting on these vehicles in preparation for revenue service. Additionally, the Oakridge yard was home to many retired coaches, including E901/902 trolleys, New Flyer D40s, and other vehicles. In the second quarter of 2008, as part of a re-organization and expansion at Burnaby Transit Centre, Oakridge took over many of the tasks formerly located at the other facilities. The Community Shuttle service was one of the groups moved, making Oakridge an active transit centre once again. However, in September 2016, the shuttle operations were shifted to the new Hamilton Transit Centre. The property has since been sold for $440 million to a developer.

== Management and personnel ==
=== Employees ===
CMBC's 5200+ employees are spread across Metro Vancouver.

- The 3700 bus operators, represented by Unifor Local 111, and the 1100 maintenance employees, represented by Unifor Local 2200, work out of the six regional depots.
- The SeaBus staff of 80, including marine attendants, deck officers, engineers, coordinators (also represented by Unifor Local 2200), and office staff work from their North Vancouver location.
- The 600 staff involved in scheduling, training, operational planning, and administrative services are spread throughout the system, as well as at CMBC's head office in New Westminster are represented by the Canadian Office and Professional Employees Union, Local 378.
- In October 2008, CMBC was named one of BC's Top Employers by Mediacorp Canada Inc.
- Coast Mountain Bus Company operates the Transit Security Department for TransLink. Transit security officers are mobile, ride buses and trains, inspect fares, issue fines and patrol TransLink properties (bus loops and exchanges, SkyTrain stations, SeaBus, etc.) and are authorized to arrest persons who commit criminal offences on or in relation to any TransLink properties per the Criminal Code. Transit security officers are also authorized to enforce Transit Conduct and Safety Regulations, as well as the Transit Tariff Bylaw under the South Coast British Columbia Transportation Authority Act (SCBCTA Act).

=== Labour disputes ===
In 2001, over 3,400 workers rallied in a strike and disrupted transit service for 123 days, from April 1, 2001, to August 1, 2001. SkyTrain service was not affected.

In January 2024, CUPE 4500, a union representing transit supervisors and other bus system staff, went on strike. All bus and SeaBus service operated by CMBC in Metro Vancouver was cancelled on January 22 and 23 as a result. The union applied to the BC Labour Relations Board for permission to picket at SkyTrain facilities; if approved, this would mean any future job action by CUPE 4500 would shut down SkyTrain services on all three lines.

== Fleet roster ==
=== Current fleet ===
The following fleet is owned by TransLink and operated and maintained by CMBC.

Order year	Picture	Manufacturer	Model	Powertrain (engine/transmission)	Propulsion	Fleet (qty.)	Notes
12 metres (40 ft)
2005–2007		NFI	E40LF E40LFR	Vossloh Kiepe propulsion and Škoda traction motor	Electric trolley bus	2101–2199, 2201–2289 (188)	To be retired and replaced with Solaris trolleys from 2027
2007		NovaBus	LFS	Cummins ISL; ZF 6HP592C	Diesel	9605–9699, 9701–9725 (120)	9601–9604 transferred to West Vancouver Municipal Transit between 2008 and 2010; renumbered 703–706
2008		NovaBus	LFS	Cummins ISL; ZF 6HP554C	Diesel	9726–9791 (66)	
2008		NovaBus	LFS	Cummins ISL; ZF 6HP554C	Diesel	9797–9799 (3)	
2008		NovaBus	LFS HEV	Cummins ISL Allison EP40 hybrid system	Hybrid	9401 (1)	
2009		NovaBus	LFS HEV	Cummins ISL Allison EP40 hybrid system	Hybrid	9402–9499 (98)	2 units retired, 13 units converted to Training units
2010		NovaBus	LFS HEV	Cummins ISL9 Allison EP40 hybrid system	Hybrid	9501–9542 (42)	
2010		NovaBus	LFS	Cummins ISL9; Allison B400R	Diesel	9543–9581, 9583–9590 (47)	
2014		NFI	XN40	Cummins Westport ISL G; ZF 6AP1400B	CNG	14001–14045 (45)	
2016		NFI	XD40	Cummins ISL9; ZF 6AP1400B	Diesel	16101–16130, 16137 (31)	16131-16136, 16138-16140 transferred to West Vancouver Municipal Transit; renumbered 1606–1614; Remainder of units to be transferred to West Vancouver Municipal Transit by 2030
2016		NFI	XN40	Cummins Westport ISL G; ZF 6AP1400B	CNG	16001–16051 (51)	
2017		NFI	XN40	Cummins Westport ISL G NZ; ZF 6AP1400B	CNG	18101–18206 (106)	
2018		NovaBus	LFS HEV	Cummins B6.7; BAE Systems Hybridrive HDS 200	Hybrid	18301–18404 (104)	
2018		NovaBus	LFS Suburban	Cummins L9; ZF EcoLife	Diesel	18451–18473 (23)	First units to sport a revised "bluetop" livery; Replacements of the aging Orion Vs
2019		ADL	Enviro500	Cummins L9 Allison B500R	Diesel	19401–19432 (32)	First unit arrived in August 2019; First buses to feature a USB charging port at all seats
2020		NFI	XN40	Cummins Westport L9N Allison B400R	CNG	19101–19147 (47)	
2021		ADL	Enviro500	Cummins L9 Allison B500R	Diesel	21401–21425 (25)	
2023		NovaBus	LFSe+	BAE Systems Series-EV HDS 200	Battery electric	23201–23215 (15)	23201 was the world debut of the LFSe+
2024		NovaBus	LFS CNG	Cummins Westport L9N; ZF EcoLife 6AP1420B	CNG	24101–24150 (50)	
2025		NovaBus	LFS CNG	Cummins Westport L9N; ZF EcoLife 6AP1420B	CNG	25101-25184 (84)	
2025		NovaBus	LFSe+	BAE Systems GPM-12	Battery electric	25201-25207 (7)	
2026		NovaBus	LFS CNG	Cummins Westport L9N; ZF EcoLife 6AP1420B	CNG	26101-26130 (30)	Features a revised livery akin to the Solaris Trollinos and the Mark Vs
2027		Solaris	Trollino 12		Electric Trolleybus	27001- (188)	27001 arrived in mid-2026 as a pilot vehicle; Replacements for the existing trolleybus fleet
18 metres (60 ft) (articulated)
2007–2008		NFI	E60LFR	Vossloh Kiepe propulsion and Škoda traction motor	Electric trolley bus	2501–2540 (40)	To be replaced by Solaris Trollino 18s in 2028
2009		NFI	E60LFR	Vossloh Kiepe propulsion and Škoda traction motor	Electric trolley bus	2541–2574 (34)	To be replaced by Solaris Trollino 18s in 2028
2010		NFI	DE60LFR	Cummins ISL9; Allison EP50 hybrid system	Hybrid	8118–8156 (39)	
2012		NFI	XDE60	Cummins ISL9; Allison H 50 EP hybrid system	Hybrid	12001–12025 (25)	12024 used as test platform for new "RapidBus" livery, later given same livery as 2015+ units
2015		NFI	XDE60	Cummins ISL9; Allison H 50 EP hybrid system	Hybrid	15001–15021 (21)	
2016		NFI	XDE60	Cummins L9; Allison H 50 EP hybrid system	Hybrid	16201–16226 (26)	
2018		NFI	XDE60	Cummins L9; BAE Systems HDS 300 hybrid system	Hybrid	18001–18063 (63)	First units in new RapidBus livery
2019		NFI	XDE60	Cummins L9; BAE Systems HDS 300 hybrid system	Hybrid	19001–19047 (47)	
2021		NFI	XDE60	Cummins L9; BAE Systems HDS 300 hybrid system	Hybrid	21001–21025 (25)	
2022		NFI	XDE60	Cummins L9; BAE Systems HDS 300 hybrid system	Hybrid	22001–22015 (15)	
2023		NFI	XDE60	Cummins L9; BAE Systems HDS 300 hybrid system	Hybrid	23001–23015 (15)	
2024		NFI	XDE60	Cummins L9; BAE Systems HDS 200 hybrid system	Hybrid	24001–24016 (16)	
2028		Solaris	Trollino 18		Electric trolleybus	28201-28274 (74)	28201 arrived in Late 2026 as the pilot vehicle

==== Community Shuttle ====
Year	Picture	Builder	Model	Chassis	Powertrain (engine/transmission)	Propulsion	Fleet series	Notes
2019–2020		ARBOC	Spirit of Mobility	Chevrolet Express	GM Vortec 6000/L96; GM 6L90-E	Gasoline	19503–19535, 19538–19549	
2019		Girardin	G5	Chevrolet Express	GM Vortec 6000/L96; GM 6L90-E	Gasoline	19550–19554	
2020–2021		ARBOC	Spirit of Freedom	Chevrolet Express	GM Vortec 6000/L96; GM 6L90-E	Gasoline	21501–21562	
2023		Girardin	G5	Chevrolet Express	GM Vortec 6000/L96; GM 6L90-E	Gasoline	23601–23606	
2023		Girardin	G5	Ford E-450		Gasoline	23651–23665	
2024		ARBOC	Spirit of Freedom	Chevrolet Express	GM Vortec 6000/L96; GM 6L90-E	Gasoline	24506-24539	
2024		Girardin	G5	Chevrolet Express	GM Vortec 6000/L96; GM 6L90-E	Gasoline	24601–24634	
2025		ARBOC	Spirit of Freedom	Chevrolet Express	GM Vortec 6000/L96; GM 6L90-E	Gasoline	25501-25523	
2025		Girardin	G5	Chevrolet Express	GM Vortec 6000/L96; GM 6L90-E	Gasoline	25601–25627	
2026		Girardin	G5	Chevrolet Express	GM Vortec 6000/L96; GM 6L90-E	Gasoline	26601-26624	

==== SeaBus ====
Vessel	Year of construction (location)	Capacity	Status	Exterior	Interior
MV Burrard Otter	1976 (Vancouver)	385	Retired – December 2016		
MV Burrard Beaver	1976 (Victoria)	385	In use		Similar to Burrard Otter
MV Burrard Pacific Breeze	2009 (Victoria)	385	In use		
MV Burrard Otter II	2014 (Singapore)	385	In use	(similar to Burrard Pacific Breeze)	(similar to Burrard Chinook)
MV Burrard Chinook	2019 (Netherlands)	385	In use		

==== Notes ====
- All vehicles are wheelchair-accessible.
- All CMBC diesel buses are currently running on a 5% bio-diesel blend.

==== Prefixes ====
Letter prefixes are prepended to the bus numbers on most conventional Coast Mountain buses, except trolleys. Generally, the prefixes are used to identify which garage the bus is operating from.

- B – Burnaby
- H – Hamilton
- P – Port Coquitlam
- R – Richmond
- S – Surrey (or Community Shuttle)
- V – Vancouver (formerly Oakridge)
- T – Training vehicle (or HandyDART)

===== Former prefixes =====
These are prefixes not in use that were formerly used.

- N – North Vancouver (until September 2016)

==== Numbering ====
Since 2012, Coast Mountain buses are numbered by the order year, series number and unit number. For example, bus number 12001 would have been ordered in 2012, is part of that year's "000" series (denoting New Flyer XDE60 articulated buses), and the first bus received. The order year may not reflect a bus' production year; bus number 12024 is the 24th bus in the same order placed in 2012 but was not produced until 2013. Series numbers vary by year and are often not reused on the same models each year. Community Shuttles since 2016 are always numbered in the "500" series. Prior to 2012, buses followed a legacy numbering system adopted from the former BC Transit Vancouver Regional Transit System, where buses would be numbered by series. Bus number 3334, for example, would be bus number 134 of the New Flyer C40LF/C40LFR 3200/3300 series. Unlike the current numbering system, all bus numbers ending in −00 would be skipped due to BC Transit policy. This was abolished when the new system was implemented in 2012. Exceptions to this are trolley buses, which follow a numbering scheme dating back to the British Columbia Electric Railway era, and older Community Shuttles, which followed either a three-digit system or the four-digit system of West Vancouver. These Community Shuttles carried "S" prefixes to denote "Shuttle" and their numbering systems did not skip bus numbers ending in −00.

==== Additional fleet notes ====
The first prototype 40-foot (12 m) New Flyer/Vossloh Kiepe low-floor trolley bus arrived at the Oakridge Transit Centre on July 2, 2005. The 187 additional vehicles of that type arrived in 2006–2007, and all had entered service by the end of 2007. The first 60-foot (18 m) articulated trolley coach (#2501) arrived at the Oakridge Transit Centre in January 2007. The others started arriving in January 2008, and all 74 had entered service by the end of 2009.

It was announced that the original bike racks on the 2006 New Flyer buses can only be used in daylight, as they blocked the headlights at night. All of them have been replaced with a modified "V2W" rack.

=== Retired fleet ===
The following fleet were owned by TransLink and operated and maintained by CMBC or demonstrated with CMBC.

Order year	Year retired	Picture	Manufacturer	Model	Powertrain (engine/transmission)	Propulsion	Fleet	Notes
12 metres (40 ft)
1982			Flyer Industries	D901A	Detroit Diesel 6V71N; Allison V730	Diesel	1158–1192	
1982			GMDD	T6H-5307N	Detroit Diesel 6V92TA; Allison V730	Diesel	4101–4115	
1987	2007		GMDD	TC40-102N	Detroit Diesel 6V92TA; Allison V731	Diesel	4116–4143	
1989	2006–2007		MCI	TC40-102N	Detroit Diesel 6V92TA; Allison V731	Diesel	4144–4192	
1990	2006–2007		MCI	TC40-102N	Detroit Diesel 6V92TA; Voith D86.3ADR	Diesel	4193–4199 4201–4278	
1991	2006–2010		NFI	D40	Detroit Diesel 6V92TA; Allison HTB-748	Diesel	3101–3210	
1992	2009–2010		NFI	D40	Detroit Diesel 6V92TA; Allison HTB-748	Diesel	3211–3257	
1995	2011		NFI	C40	Detroit Diesel Series 50; Allison B400R	Diesel (ex-CNG)	3258–3282	
1995–1996	2012-2018		NFI	D40LF	Detroit Diesel Series 50; Allison WB-400R5	Diesel	7101–7150	7112 is used as a community outreach bus
1996	2012–2019		NFI	D40LF	Detroit Diesel Series 50; Allison WB-400R5	Diesel	7151–7243	7183 has been preserved by Transit Museum Society as BC Transit 9753
1998	2011, 2016–2019		NFI	C40LF	Detroit Diesel Series 50 EGR; Allison WB-400R5; Cummins Westport C Gas Plus; Voith D863.3	CNG/Diesel (ex-CNG)	3283–3299, 3301–3305	
1996	2010		NFI	F40LF	Cummins ISB; GM-Allison EP-40 hybrid system	Diesel electric (ex-hydrogen fuel cell)	7244–7246	
1998	2000 (CMBC), 2013 (WVMT)		NovaBus	LFS	Cummins C8.3; Allison B400R5	Diesel	7298	
1998	2014-2019		NFI	D40LF	Detroit Diesel Series 50; Allison WB-400R5	Diesel	7247–7297	
1999	2016–2019		NFI	D40LF	Detroit Diesel Series 50; Allison WB-400R5	Diesel	7299, 7301–7374	
2000	2016–2024		NFI	D40LF	Cummins ISL; Allison WB-400R5	Diesel	7375–7399, 7401–7408, 7410–7418, 7420–7425, 7427–7429	
2000–2001	2018–2023		OBI	V (05.501)	Detroit Diesel Series 50 EGR; Allison WB-500R6	Diesel	9201–9276 (76)	
2001	2024		NFI	D40LF	Cummins ISL; Allison WB-400R5	Diesel	7430–7437, 7440–7442, 7444, 7446	
2006	2024–2026		NFI	D40LFR	Cummins ISL; Allison WB-400R6	Diesel	7447–7499, 7501–7504 (57)	
2008	2025–2026		OBI	V (05.501)	Cummins ISL; Allison B400R	Diesel	9277–9285 (9)	Final high-floor buses retired for the Coast Mountain Bus Company.
Trolley bus
1982–1983	2002–2008		Flyer Industries	E901A-E902	General Electric	Electric trolley bus	2701–2947	
18 metres (60 ft)
1991	2010	An older high-floor	NFI	D60	Detroit Diesel 6V92TA; Allison HTB-748	Diesel	3001–3021	
1998	2016–2019		NFI	D60LF	Detroit Diesel Series 50; Allison WB-500R5	Diesel	8001–8021	
1999	2016–2019		NFI	D60LF	Detroit Diesel Series 50; Allison WB-500R5	Diesel	8022–8047	
2000	2015–2019		NFI	D60LF	Detroit Diesel Series 50 EGR; Allison WB-500R5	Diesel	8048–8099, 8101	
2006	2025		NFI	C40LFR	Cummins Westport C-Gas Plus; Cummins Westport ISL-G; Allison WB-400R6	CNG	3309–3358 (50)	
2007	2024		NFI	D60LFR	Cummins ISM; Allison WB-500R6	Diesel	8102–8117 (16)	
Community Shuttle
1996–1997			Ford	E450	International T444E; Ford AOD	Diesel	S057–S061	
2000			Ford	E350	International T444E; Ford AOD	Diesel	S001	
2001			Ford	E350	International T444E; Ford AOD	Diesel	S002	
2002–2003			Ford	E450	International T444E; Ford AOD with Telma retarder	Diesel	S006–S056	
2004			Ford	E450	International VT365; Ford Torqshift with Telma retarder	Diesel	S062–S102	
2005			GMC	C5500	GM Duramax 6.6L; Allison 1000 with Telma retarder	Diesel	S202–S236	
2005			GMC	C5500	GM Duramax 6.6L; Allison 1000 with Telma retarder	Diesel	S237–S57	
2007			GMC	C5500	GM Duramax 6.6L; Allison 1000 with Telma retarder	Diesel	S258–S301	
2008–2009			GMC	C5500	GM Duramax 6.6L; Allison 1000 with Telma retarder	Diesel	S305–S356, S357–S380	
2012			International	AC series	International MaxxForce 7; Allison 1000	Diesel	S410–S434	
2013			International	AC series	International MaxxForce 7; Allison 1000	Diesel	S435–S464	
2013			Chevrolet	G4500	GM Vortec 6000/L96; GM 6L90-E with Telma retarder	Gasoline	S1301-S1320, S1321	
2014			International	AC series	International MaxxForce 7; Allison 1000	Diesel	S465–S471	
2014			Chevrolet	G4500	GM Vortec 6000/L96; GM 6L90-E with Telma retarder	Gasoline	S1322-S1325, S501-S544	
2016–2018			Girardin	G5	GM Vortec 6000/L96; GM 6L90-E with Telma retarder	Gasoline	16501-16562, 17506–17564,18510–18527	

=== Demonstrator units ===
Year	Picture	Manufacturer	Model	Powertrain (engine/transmission)	Propulsion	Fleet	Notes
2005		NovaBus	LFS	Cummins ISL; ZF 5HP522C	Diesel	1001, 1002	
2005		Orion	VII	Cummins ISB; BAE HybridDrive	Diesel-Hybrid	1003	
2010		Orion	VII EPA10	Cummins ISL9	Diesel	1004	
2011		NFI	XDE40	Cummins ISL9 Allison H 40 EP hybrid system	Diesel-Hybrid	1005	
2011		NovaBus	LFX Artic	Cummins ISL9	Diesel	1006	
2014		ADL	Enviro500	Cummins ISL9; Allison B500R	Diesel	1008, 1009	Demonstrated with CMBC from November 2017 to March 2018; Ran on routes 301, 311, 351, 354, 555, 601 and 620; Wrapped in #TransLinkTomorrow livery
2017		BYD	K9		Battery electric	1007	Serving routes 4 and 41
2019		NFI	XE40	Siemens ELFA2	Battery electric	19303, 19304	Serving route 100 only
2019		NovaBus	LFSe	TM4 SUMO HD	Battery electric	19301, 19302	Serving route 100 only
2020		NovaBus	LFSe+		Battery electric	1010	Demonstrated with CMBC from February to March 2022
2023		Solaris	Trollino 12		Electric trolley bus	1011	Demonstrated with CMBC from August to September 2023

=== Gallery of fleet examples ===
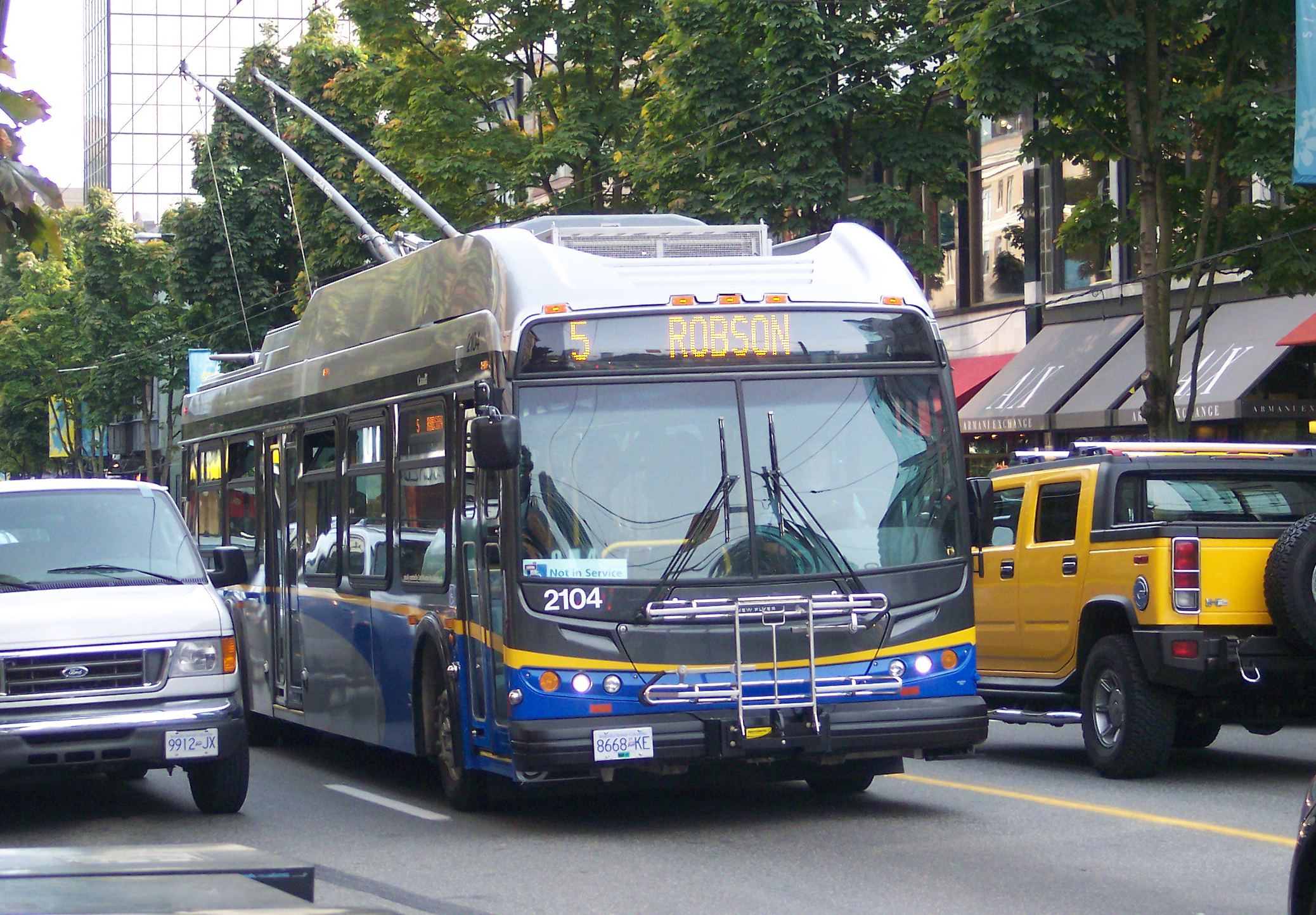
A regular-length low-floor trolleybus

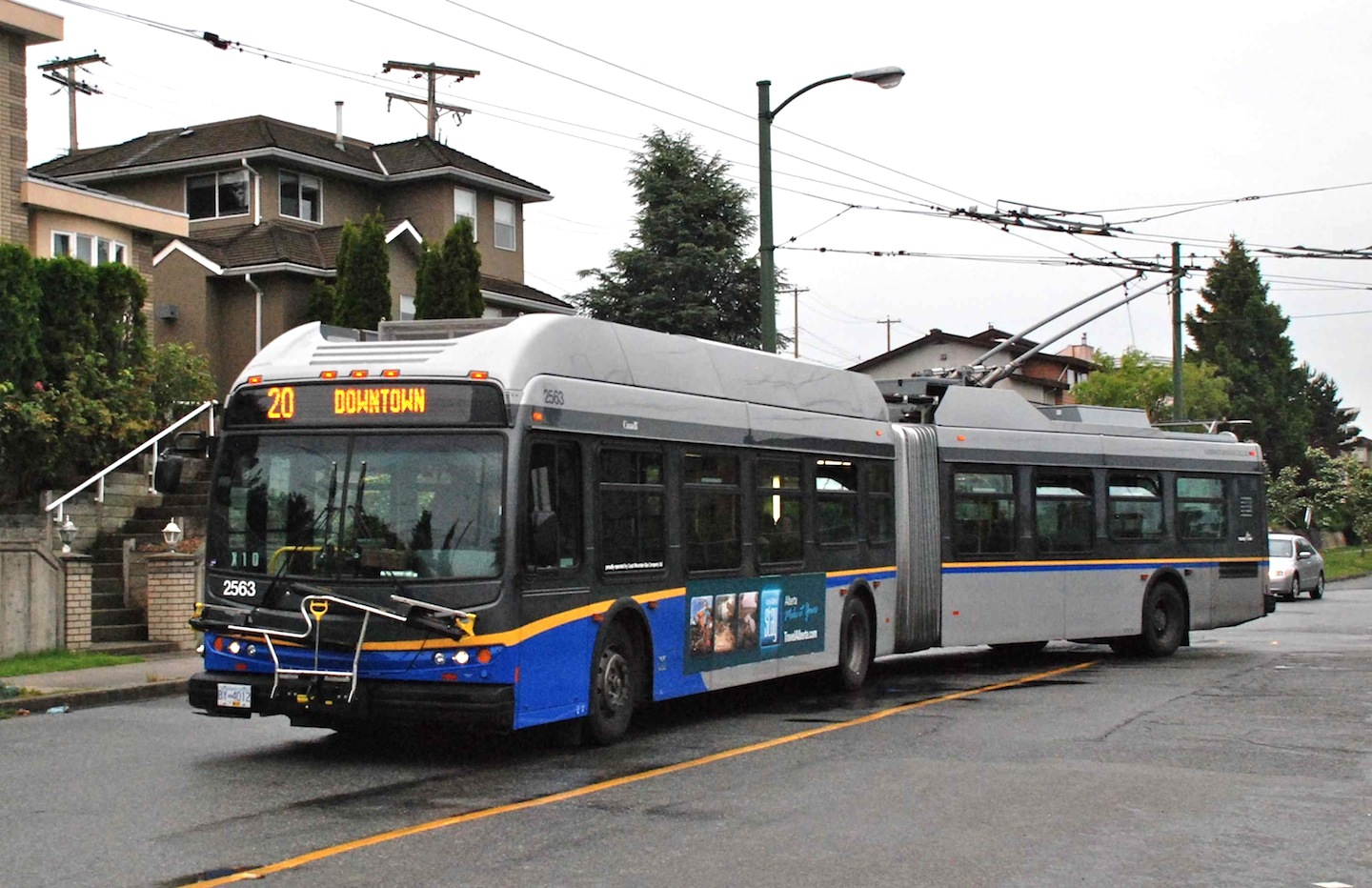
A low-floor articulated trolleybus

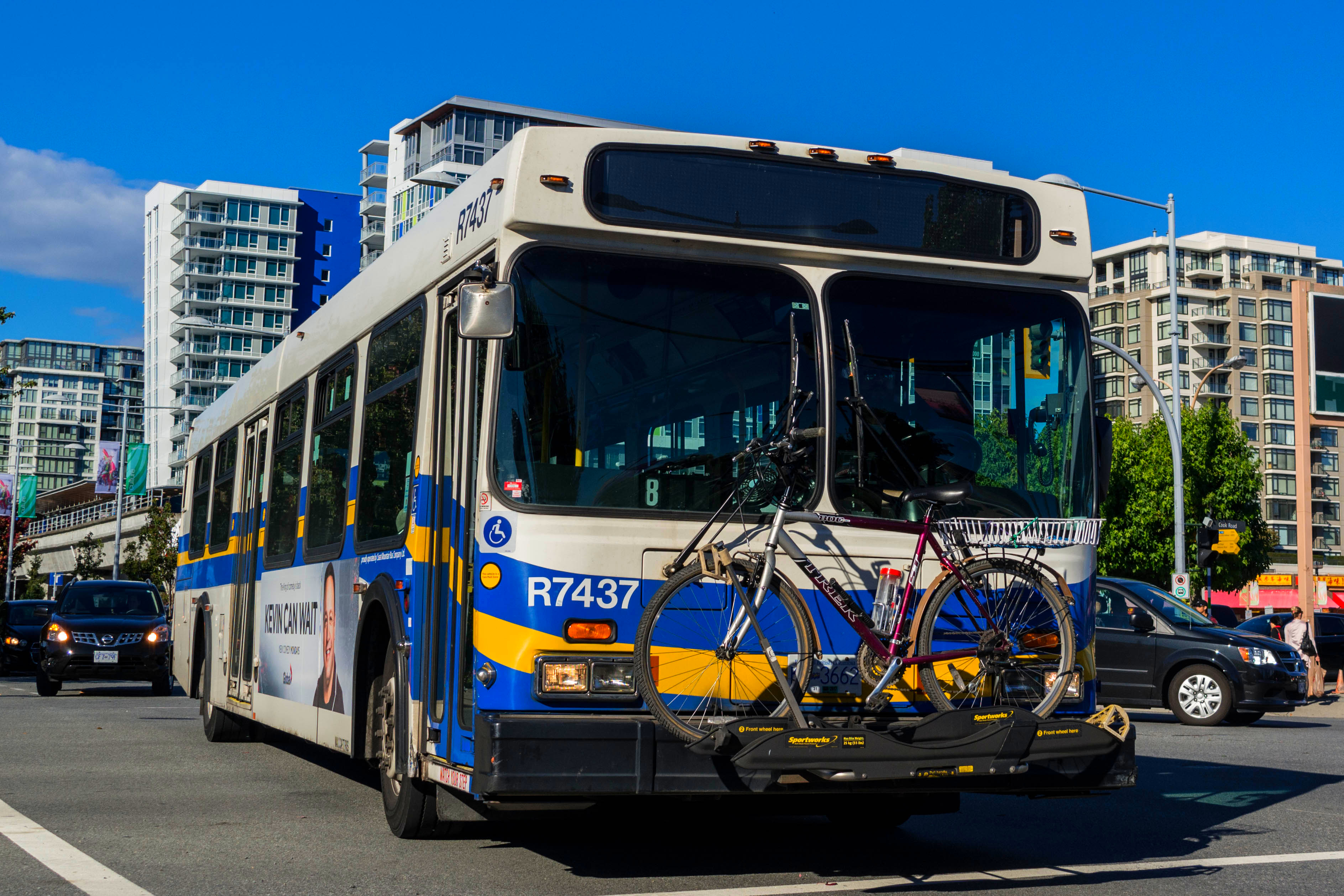
An older regular-length low-floor urban bus

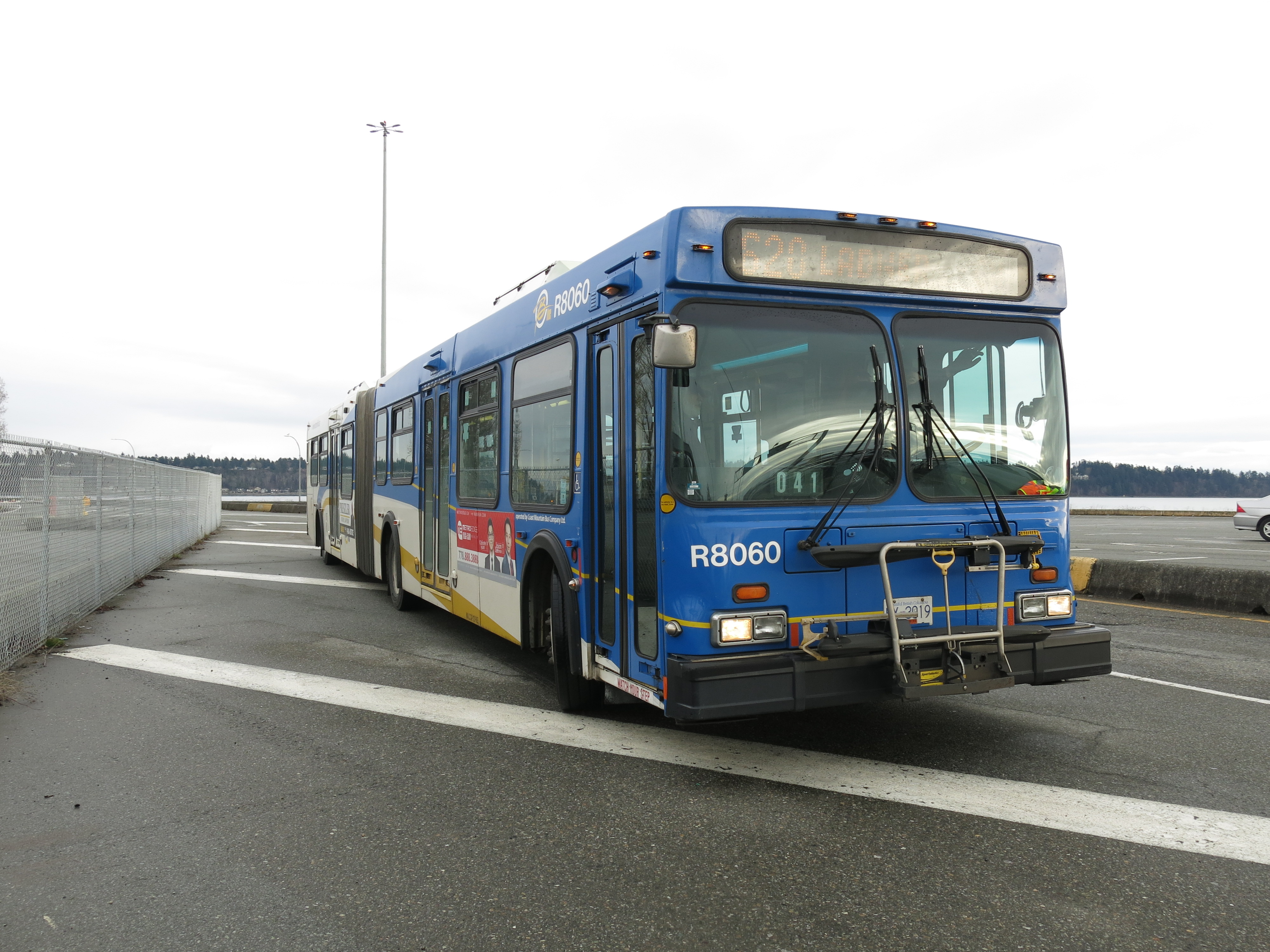
An older low-floor articulated bus

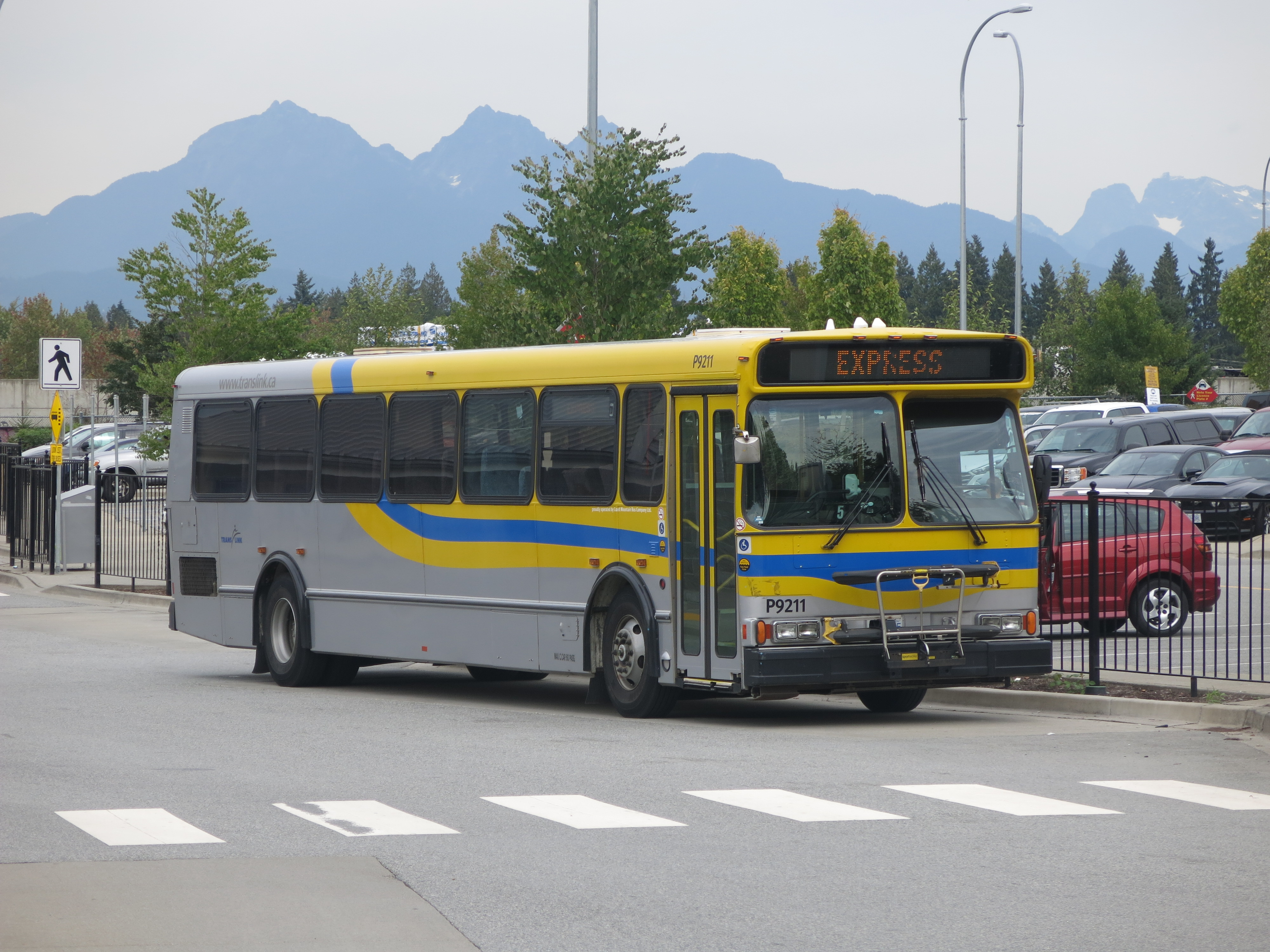
A regular-length high-floor commuter bus

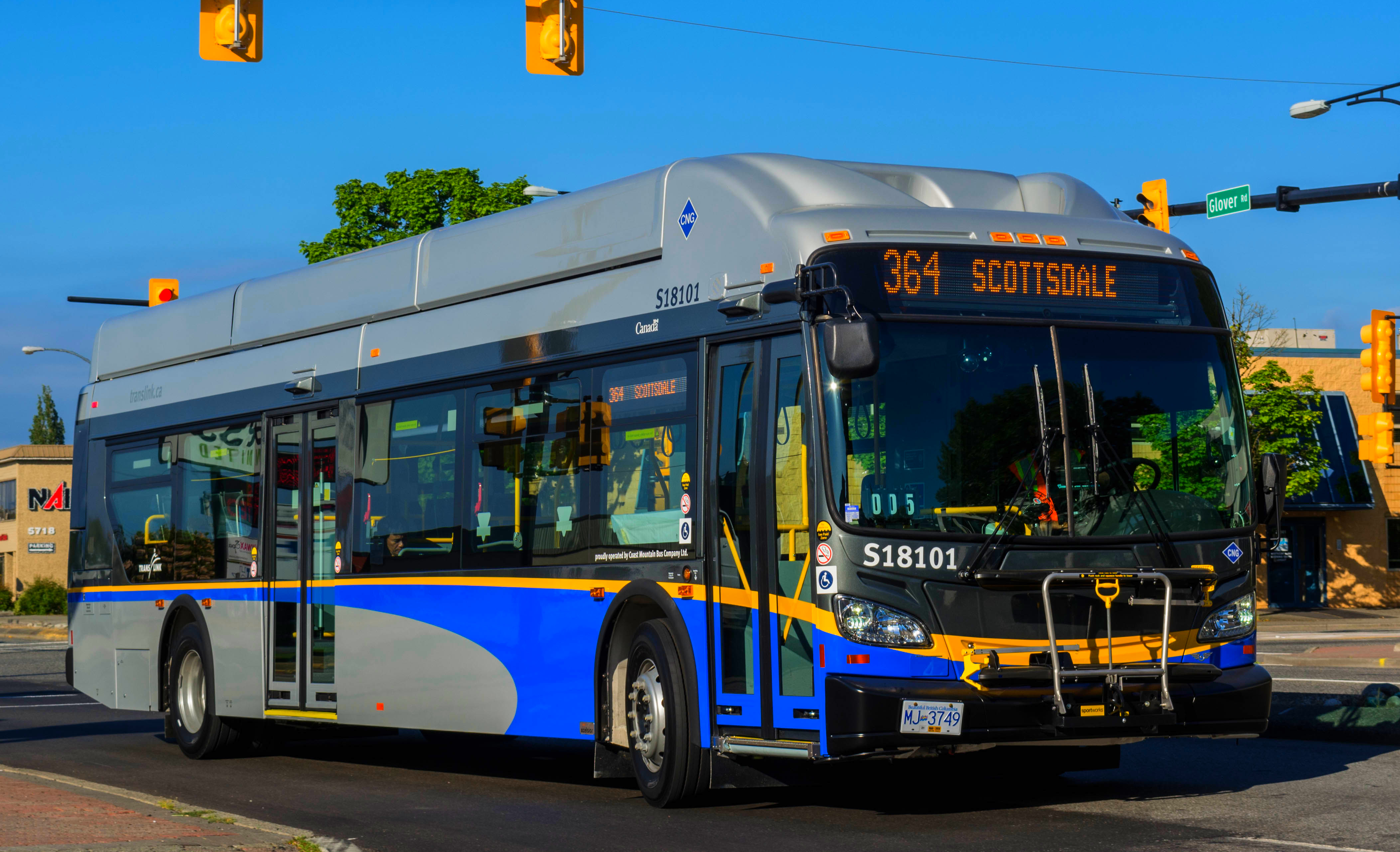
A newer regular-length low-floor urban bus

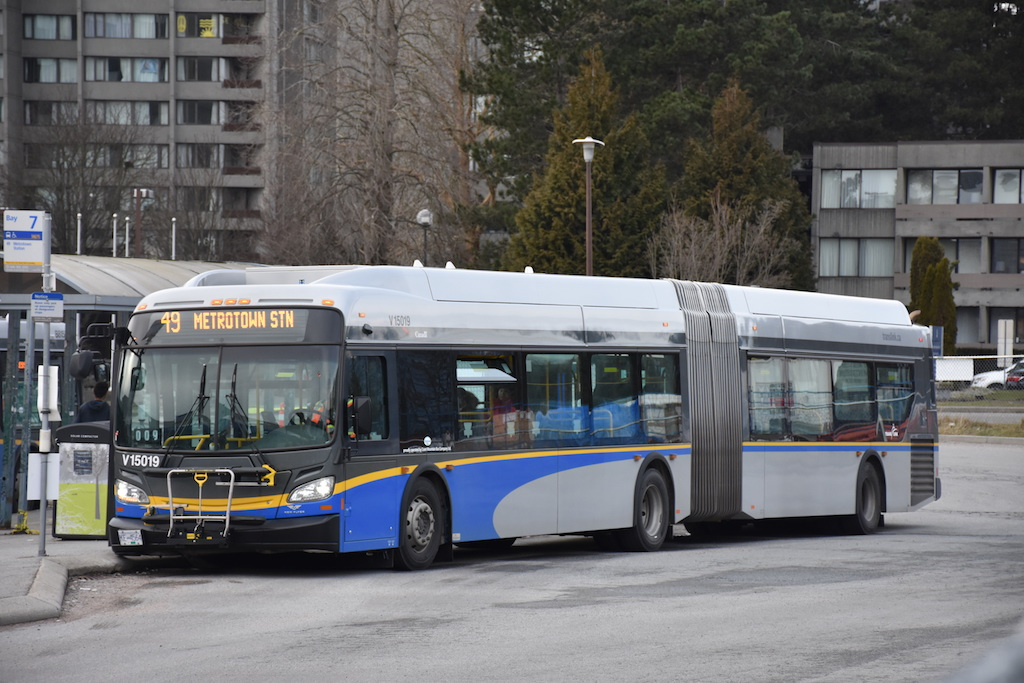
A newer low-floor articulated bus

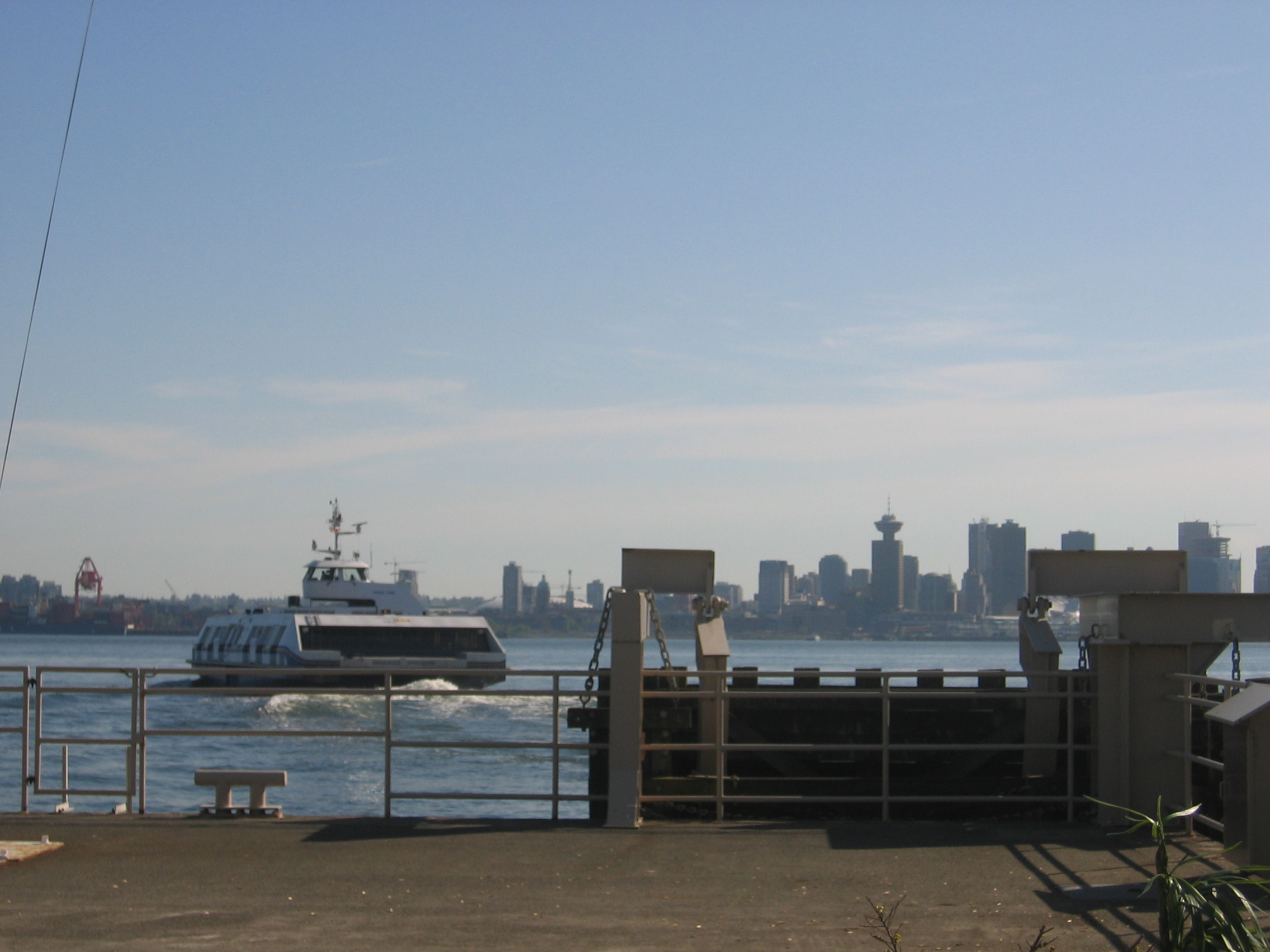
A SeaBus departing Lonsdale Quay

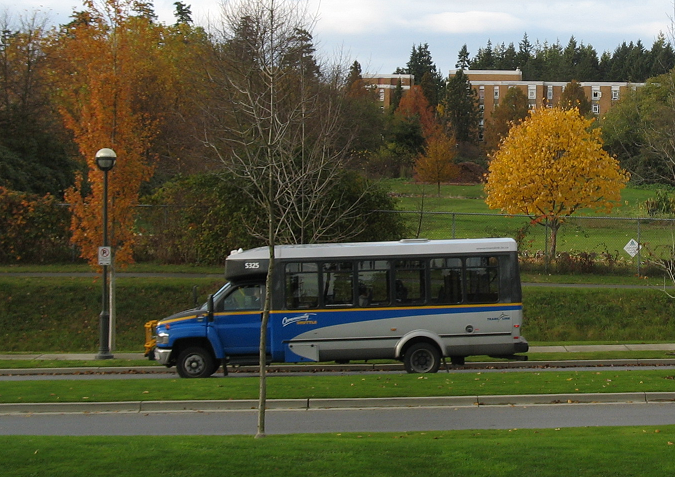
An older El Dorado Aero Elite community shuttle bus
