= Chilliwack/Agassiz-Harrison Transit System =

Canadian public transportation operator

Chilliwack Transit System Agassiz–Harrison Transit System

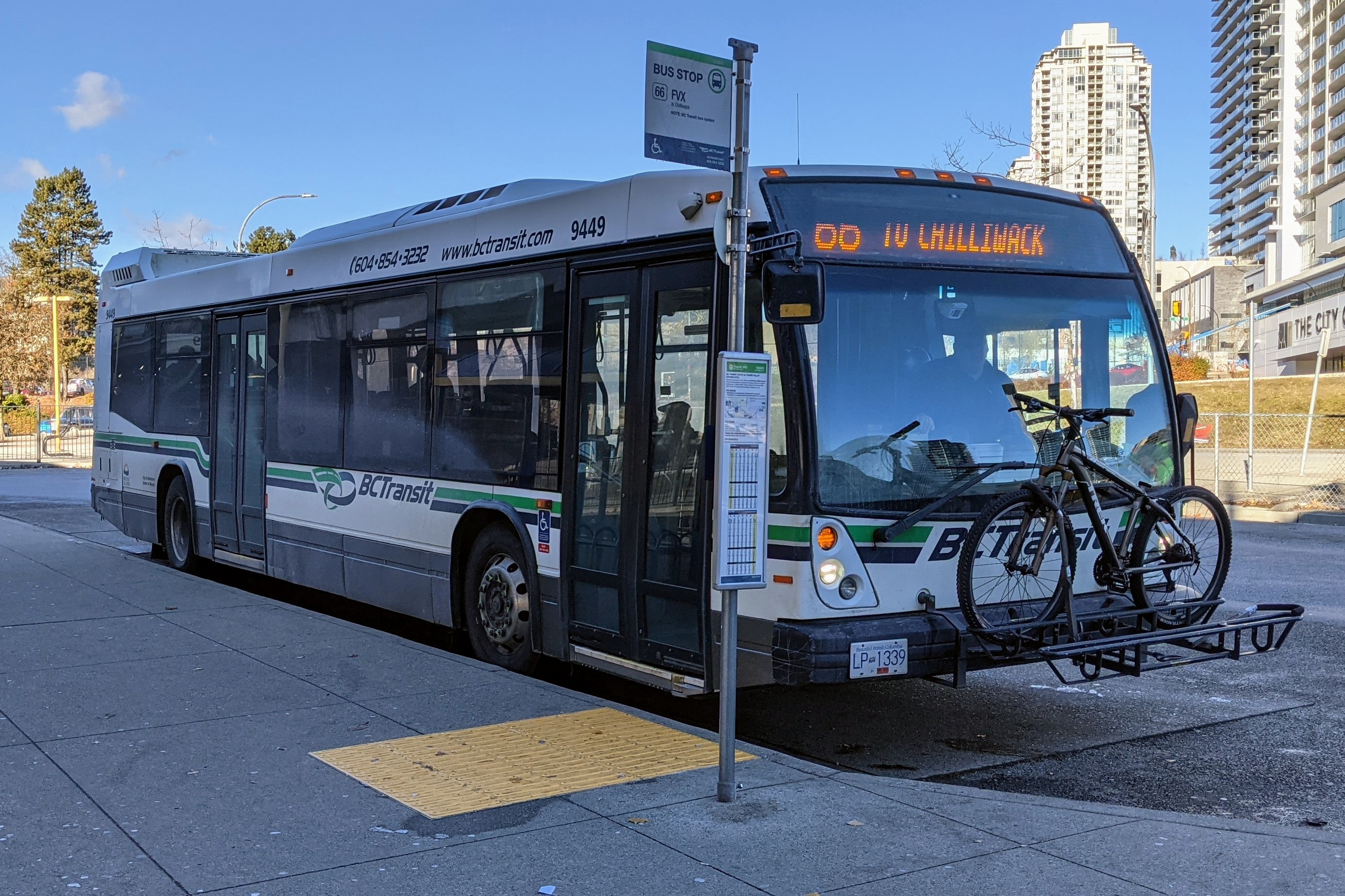
- 66 Fraser Valley Express at Lougheed station
- Locale: Chilliwack, British Columbia
- Service type: Bus service; paratransit
- Alliance: BC Transit
- Routes: 12
- Hubs: Downtown Exchange; Chilliwack Mall; Cottonwood Mall; Carvolth Exchange
- Operator: Transdev
- Chief executive: Manuel Achadinha
- Website: bctransit.com/chilliwack

Chilliwack Transit System operates the public transportation system for the City of Chilliwack in the Upper Fraser Valley of British Columbia, Canada. Funding is provided under a partnership between the city and BC Transit, the provincial agency which plans and manages municipal transit systems. HandyDART provides door-to-door transportation for people whose disability prevents them from using conventional bus service.

Agassiz–Harrison Transit System, operating on bus route 71, runs from the Chilliwack downtown exchange to Rosedale, Popkum, Agassiz and Harrison Hot Springs. Fares on this route are based on a zonal system and passengers can transfer to the Chilliwack Transit System for free while Chilliwack passengers pay the difference in fares when transferring onto the Agassiz–Harrison bus.

Funding for the Chilliwack/Agassiz–Harrison Transit System is cost shared between the District of Kent and BC Transit in partnership with the Fraser Valley Regional District, the Village of Harrison Hot Springs and the City of Chilliwack.

== Routes ==
The Chilliwack Transit System is funded by the City of Chilliwack and BC Transit.

Route numbers were renumbered in March 2022 to prevent confusion with the neighboring Central Fraser Valley Transit System.

No.	Name	Description
51	Vedder	Downtown to UFV Chilliwack Campus (via Vedder Road) and vice versa via Menzies
52	Evans	Downtown to Cottonwood Mall and vice versa via Evans Road
53	Fairfield	Downtown to Fairfield Island Loop
54	Promontory	Cottonwood Mall to Promontory via Promontory Rd and vice versa
55	Yarrow-Greendale	Vedder Road to UFV Chilliwack Campus, Yarrow and Greendale via Vedder Mountain, Yarrow Central, Keith Wilson and South Sumas Rd (weekdays and Saturdays only)
56	Cultus Lake	Promontory/Cottonwood Mall to Cultus Lake (summer only)
57	Broadway	Downtown to Cottonwood Mall & vice versa via Broadway and Airport Rd
58	Tyson	Cottonwood Mall to Tyson via Evans and Tyson Road
59	Industrial	Downtown to Cottonwood Mall and Lickman Rd in AM, Cottonwood Mall to Lickman Road and Downtown in PM (weekdays only)
66	Fraser Valley Express	Downtown to Lougheed SkyTrain station and vice versa via Highway 1
71	Agassiz–Harrison	Downtown to Rosedale, Agassiz and Harrison Hot Springs via Yale Road and Hwy 9
72	Agassiz–Hope	Agassiz to Hope via Lougheed Highway
