= The City of Lougheed =

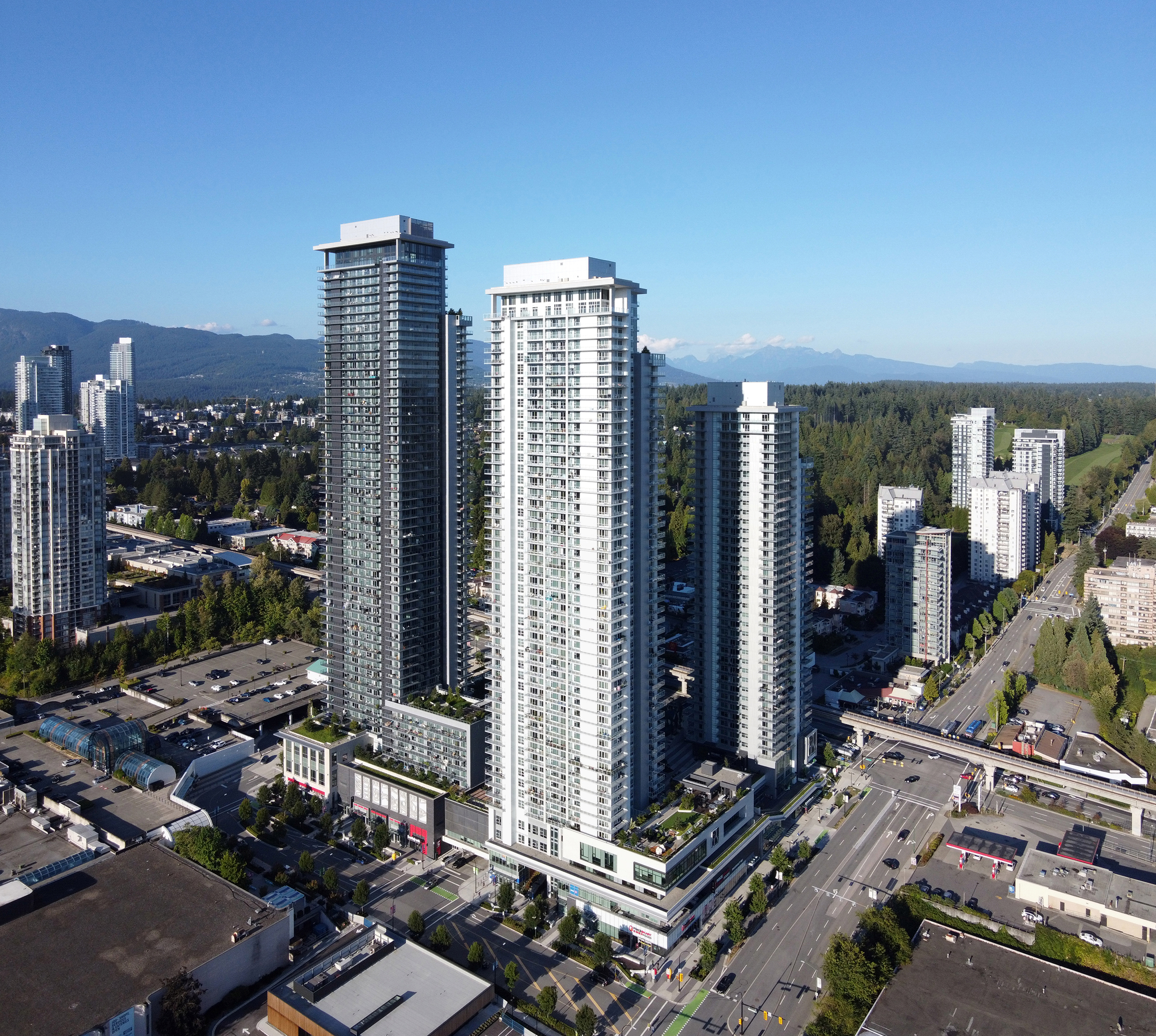
- Looking east at the City of Lougheed
- Coordinates: 49.251049°N 122.89606°W
- Address: 9855 Austin Avenue, Burnaby, British Columbia, Canada
- Opened: September 24, 1969; 57 years ago
- Manager: Shape Property Management Corp.
- Owner: Shape Properties Corp.
- Num. of stores: 160
- Num. of anchor tenants: 3
- Floor area: 57,100 m^{2} (615,000 sq ft)
- Floors: 2
- Public transit: Lougheed Town Centre station; Bus
- Website: thecityoflougheed.com

The City of Lougheed is the second-largest shopping centre in Burnaby, British Columbia, Canada, with 57,100 square metres (615,000 sq ft) and over 160 shops and services. It opened in 1969 and is located in the northeast corner of Burnaby near the Coquitlam border. The centre is located adjacent to Lougheed Town Centre station, an interchange station that connects the Expo Line and Millennium Line of Metro Vancouver's SkyTrain rapid transit system.

Formerly known as Lougheed Town Centre or Lougheed Mall, as of 2018 the 16-hectare (40-acre) site was being redeveloped into a master-planned, mixed-use community that will include up to 23 residential towers, 300 new shops and restaurants, and more than two hectares (5 acres) of public parks and plazas.

== History ==
The centre (originally known as Lougheed Mall) opened on September 24, 1969, with anchors the Bay, Safeway, and Woolco. It was the first Bay store to open in a shopping centre. Lougheed had a three-screen movie theatre within the mall complex operated by Famous Players from its opening 1969 until it closed in February 1991; it then sat vacant for a few months until the Theatre Near You chain took it over that November as a discount second-run cinema, running it until it closed for good in 2002 when mall management terminated the lease and had the former theatre renovated for additional retail space. The mall was expanded in 1986 and was renovated in the early 2000s. The Bay closed in December 2023 and the signage of the store was taken down roughly at the same time.

In keeping with the city's master plan, the Lougheed Town Centre site has been redeveloped into a mixed-use urban community called the City of Lougheed, with 300 new shops and restaurants, two hectares (5 acres) of public parks and plazas and more than 10,000 new homes. Demolition was undertaken on the east portion of the site to make way for the first neighbourhood, which includes four residential towers and new retail; it is scheduled for completion in 2021. The existing food court closed and the Eateries, a new casual dining area, opened in 2019 to initiate the transition from Lougheed Town Centre to the City of Lougheed. Future development will roll out over multiple phases. The project is being completed by real estate management, investment and development company Shape Properties Corp.

== Master plan ==
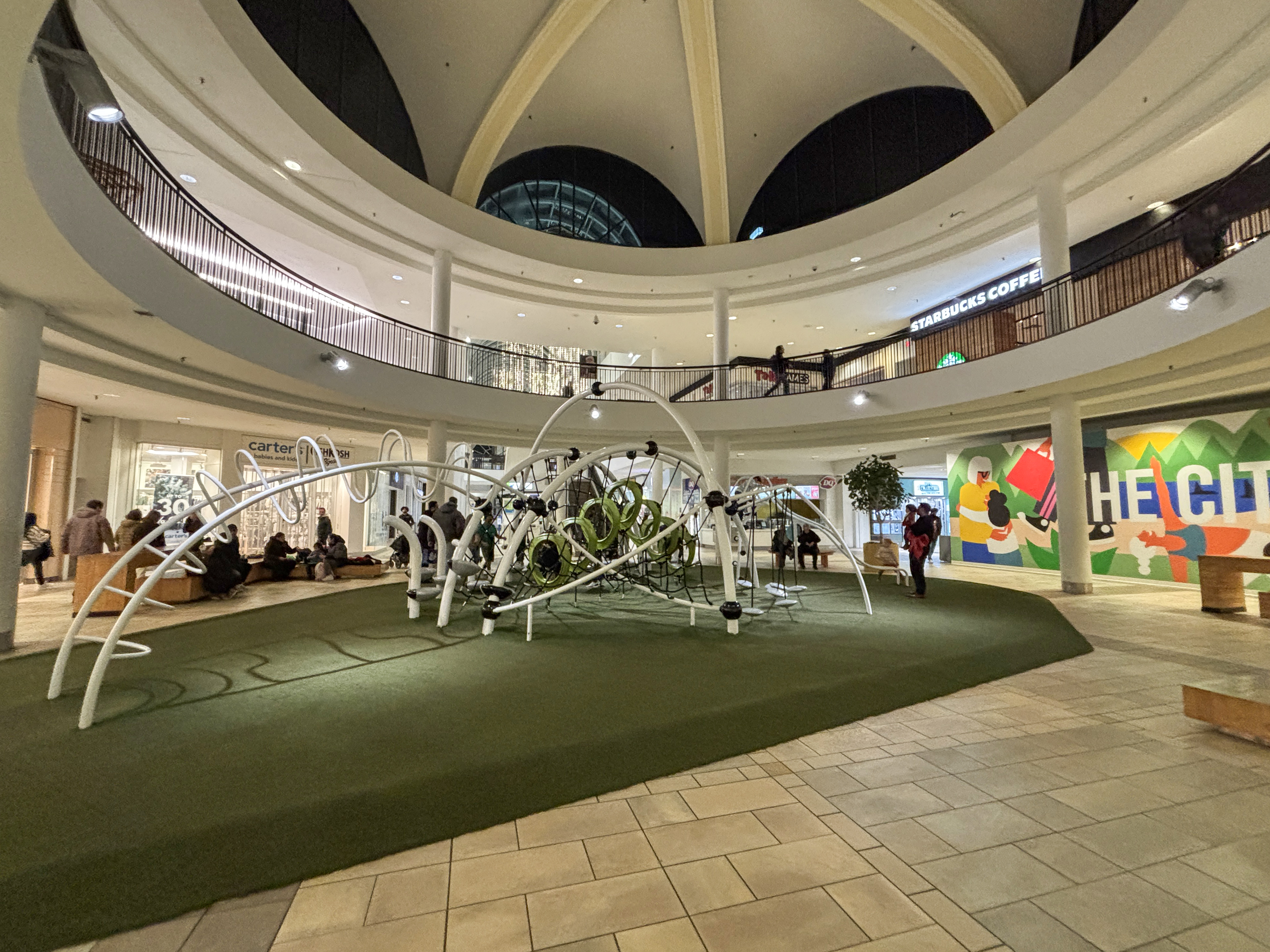
The City of Lougheed mall atrium

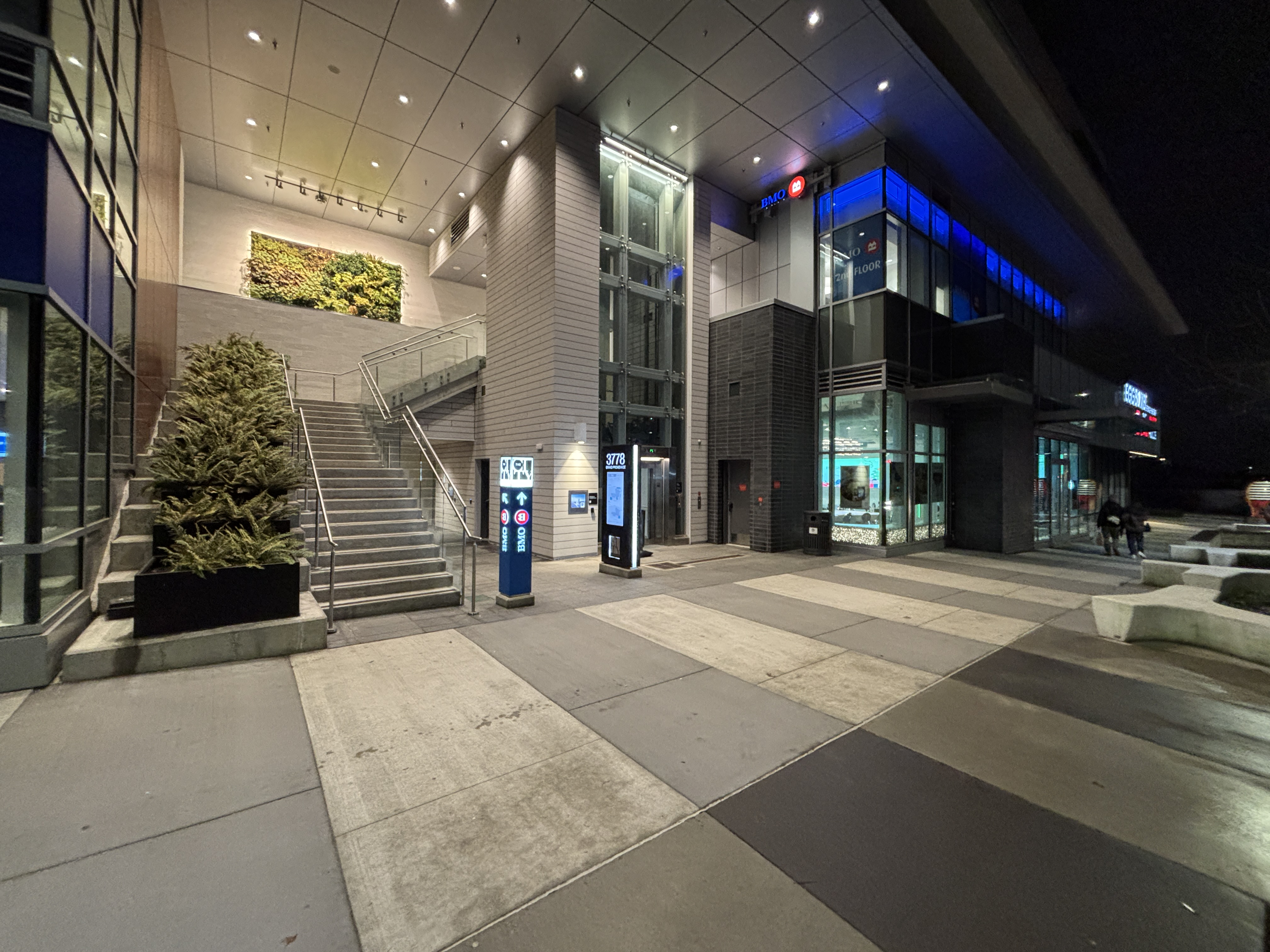
Neighbourhood One

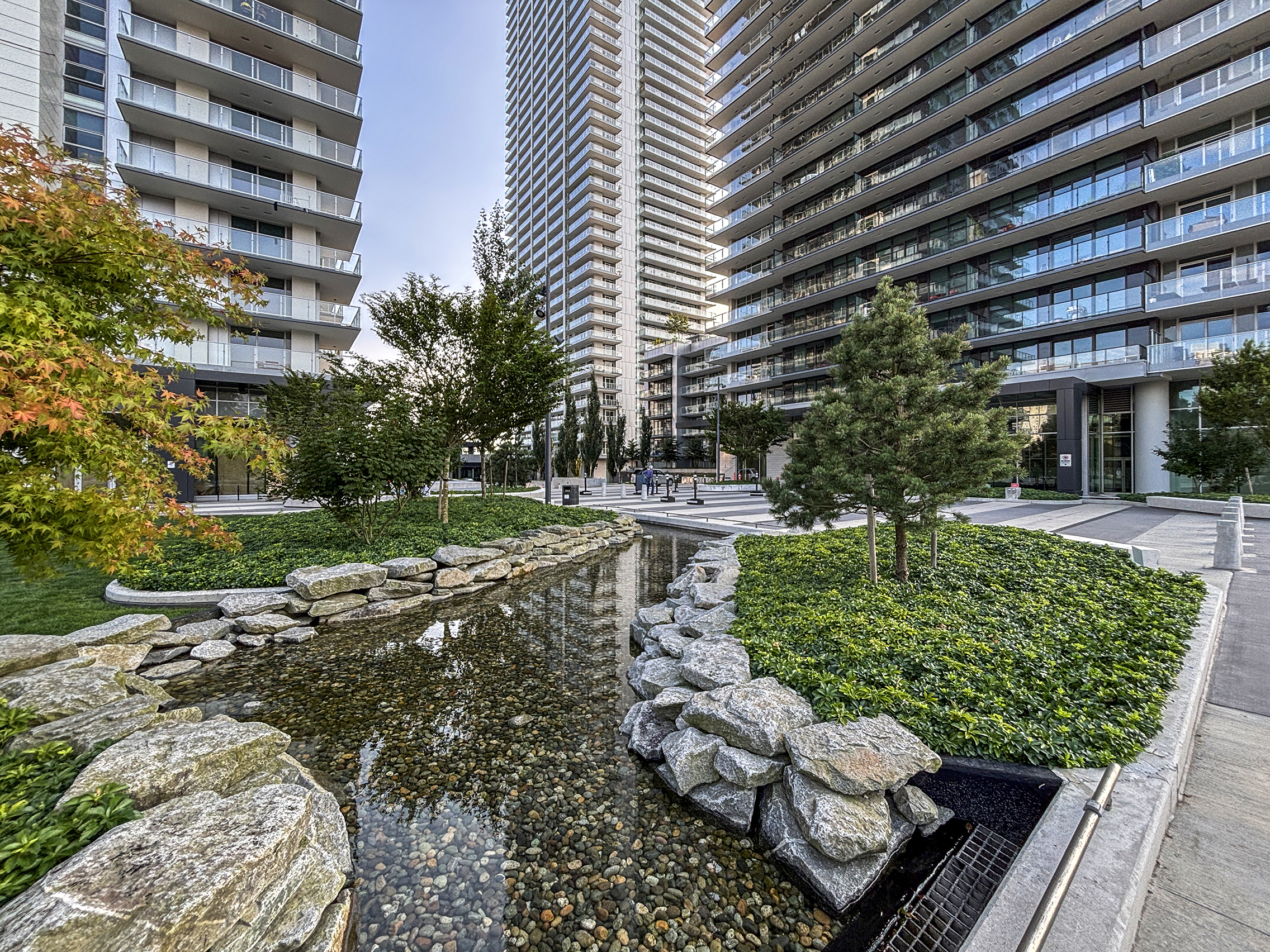
Podium garden

The City of Lougheed is one of four town centres designated by Burnaby to offer a full range of housing, office, retail, services and the option to walk, bike, take transit or drive to access a mix of goods and services. All four town centres are served by rapid transit and provide higher-density housing opportunities.

The master plan for the Lougheed Town Centre Core Area was adopted by Burnaby City Council on August 29, 2016. This was an undertaking of city staff in collaboration with Shape Properties Corp., James KM Cheng Architects Inc., and various consultant teams. Two public consultation processes also contributed to the development of the master plan, including open houses and information displays in the community. The master plan laid out the Lougheed Core Area's transformation into a transit-connected, mixed-use area with diverse housing, employment, service, and recreation opportunities. The master plan has been used to inform and guide site-specific rezoning applications within the Lougheed Town Centre Core Area and was awarded the Planning Institute of British Columbia's "2016 Award for Excellence in Planning Practice – City and Urban Areas – GOLD".

== Transportation ==
The City of Lougheed is served by the regional SkyTrain system, with the closest station being Lougheed Town Centre station, which is one of the exchange stations between Expo Line trains bound for Waterfront station and Millennium Line trains bound for either Lafarge Lake–Douglas station or VCC–Clark station. The mall is also served by a bus loop, with routes going to the Tri-Cities area, Burnaby, New Westminster, and express service to Fraser Heights, Langley, and as far east as the Fraser Valley.

== Gallery ==
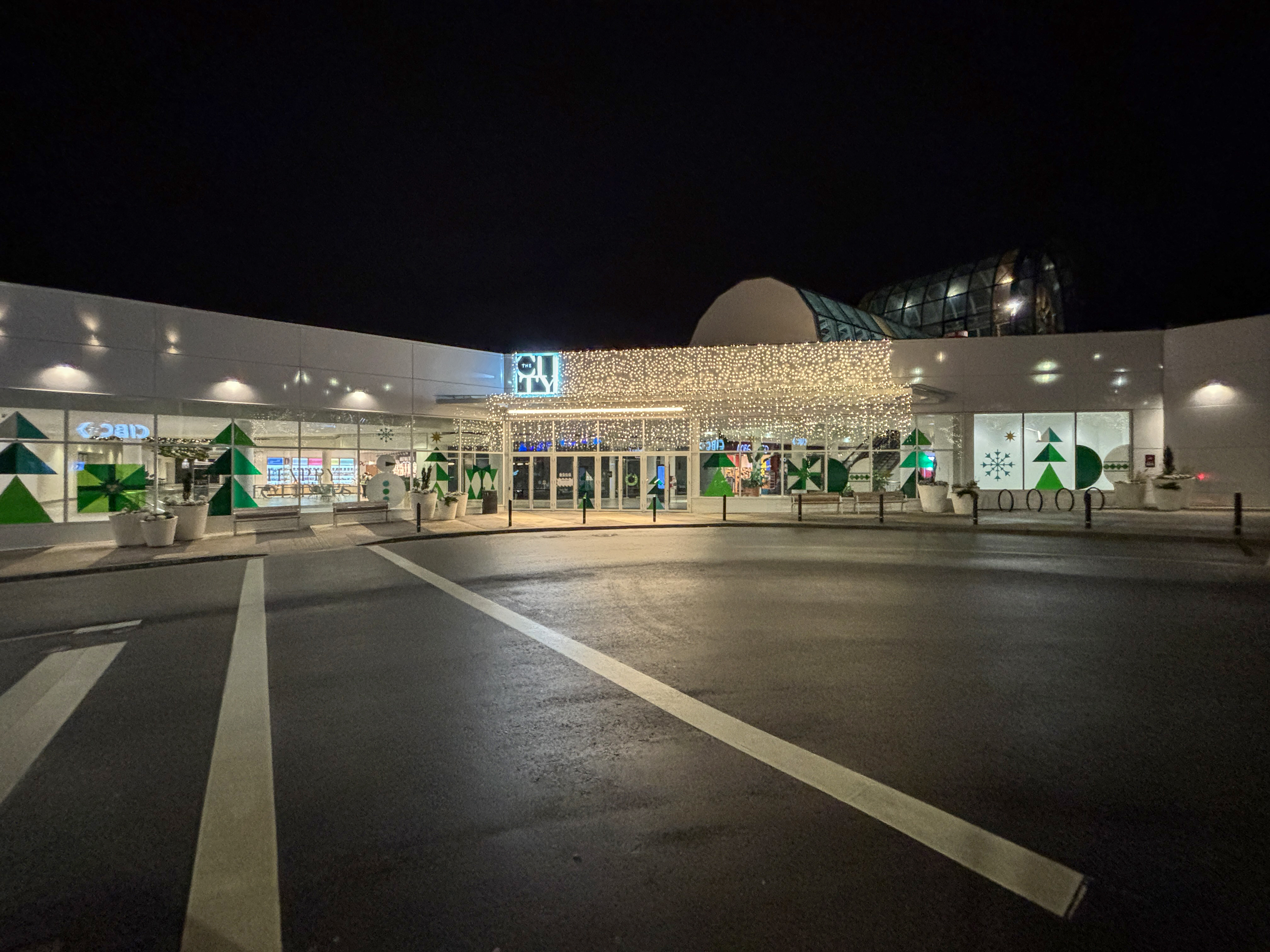
Mall exterior in 2024

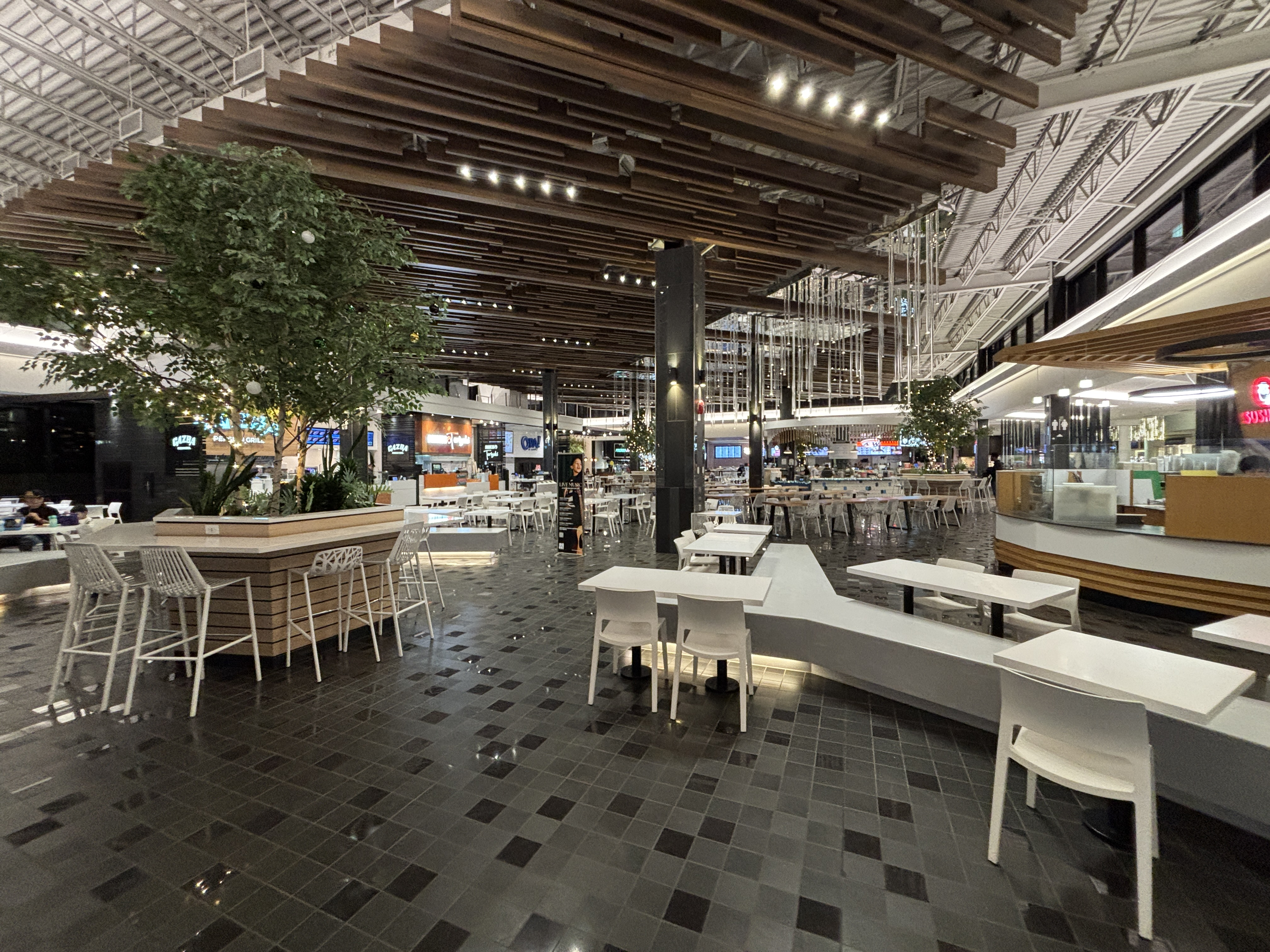
Food court after renovation

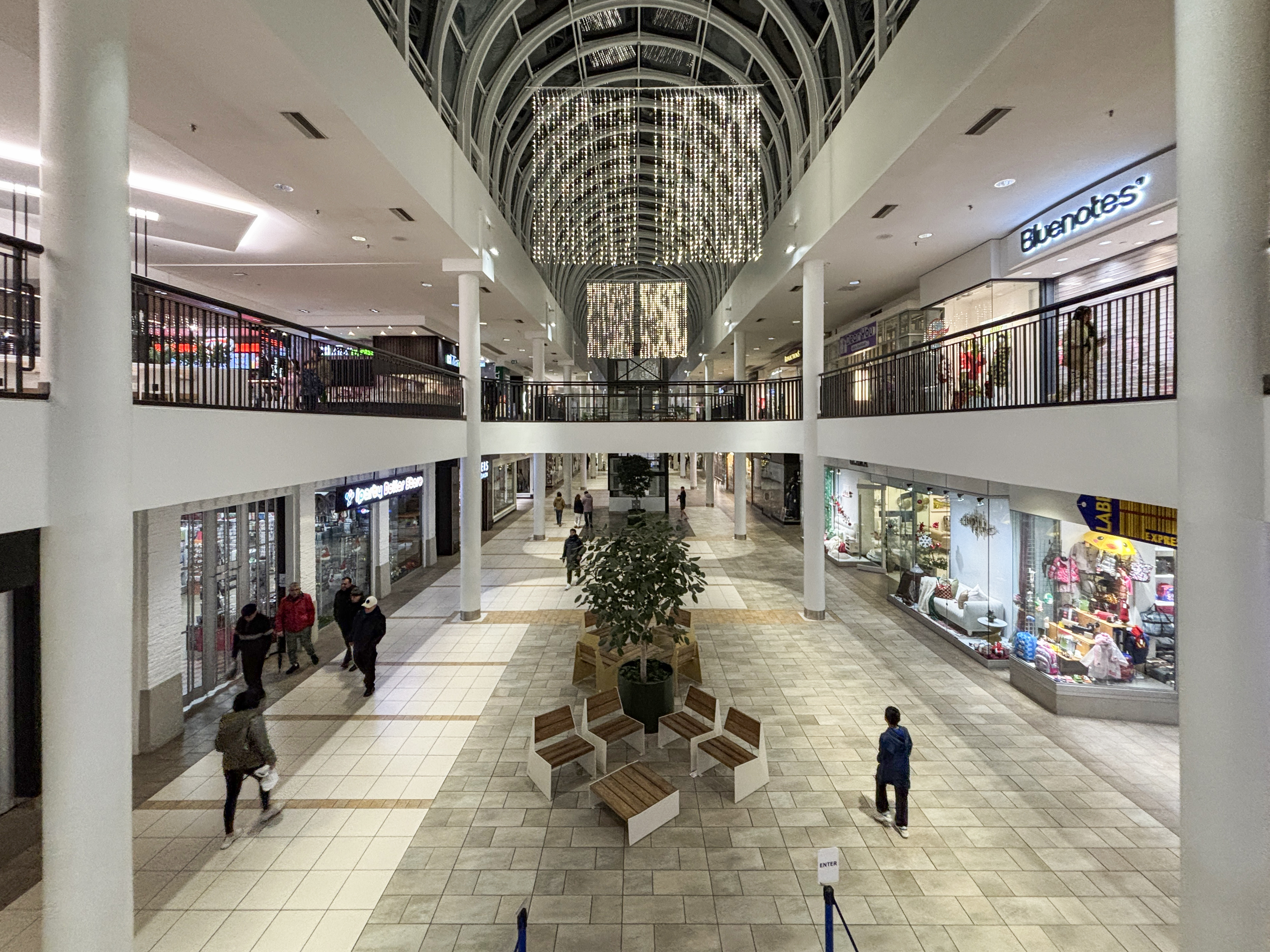
Mall interior

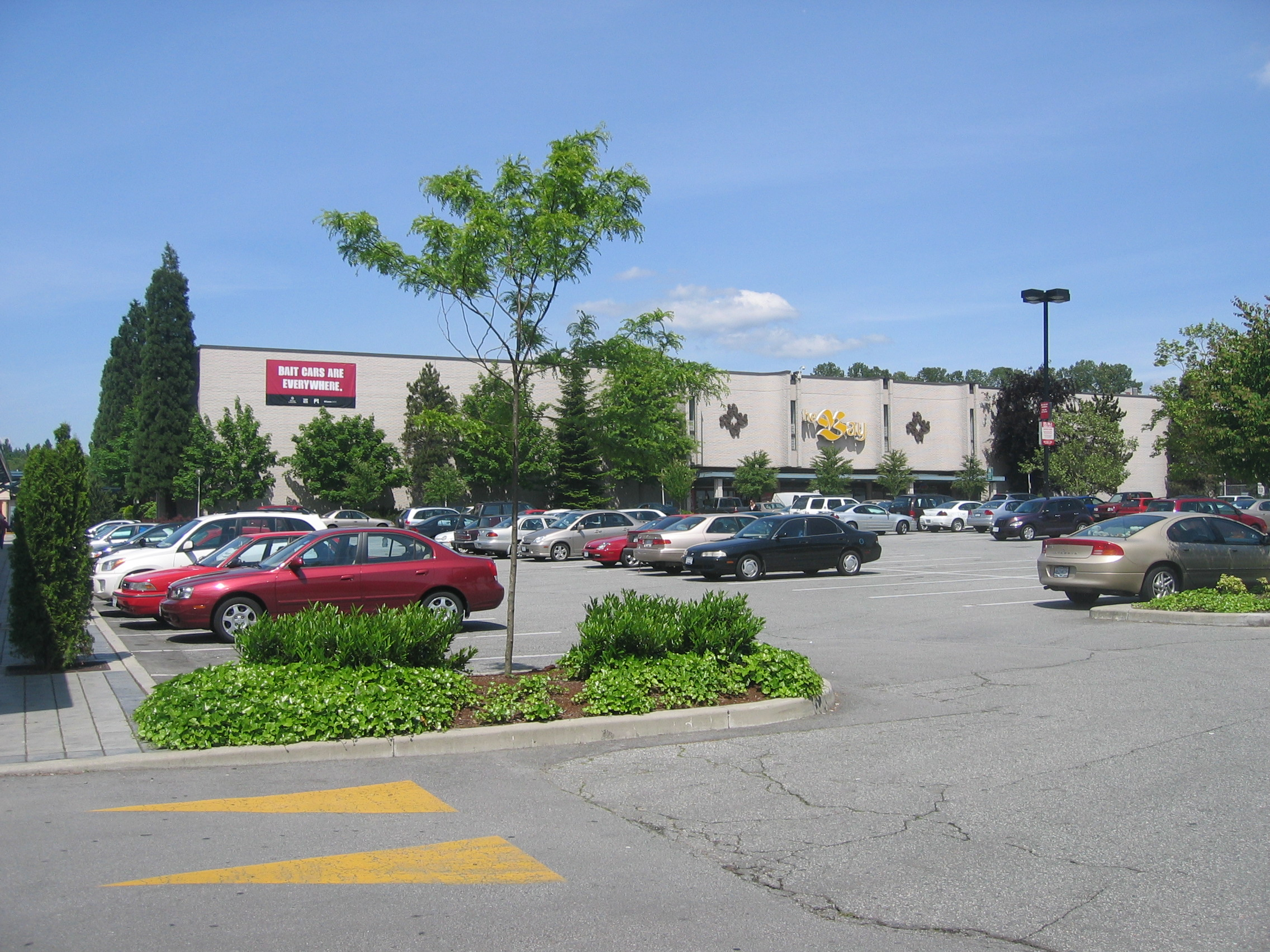
Lougheed Town Centre in 2006
