= Lougheed Town Centre station =

Metro Vancouver SkyTrain station

Lougheed Town Centre
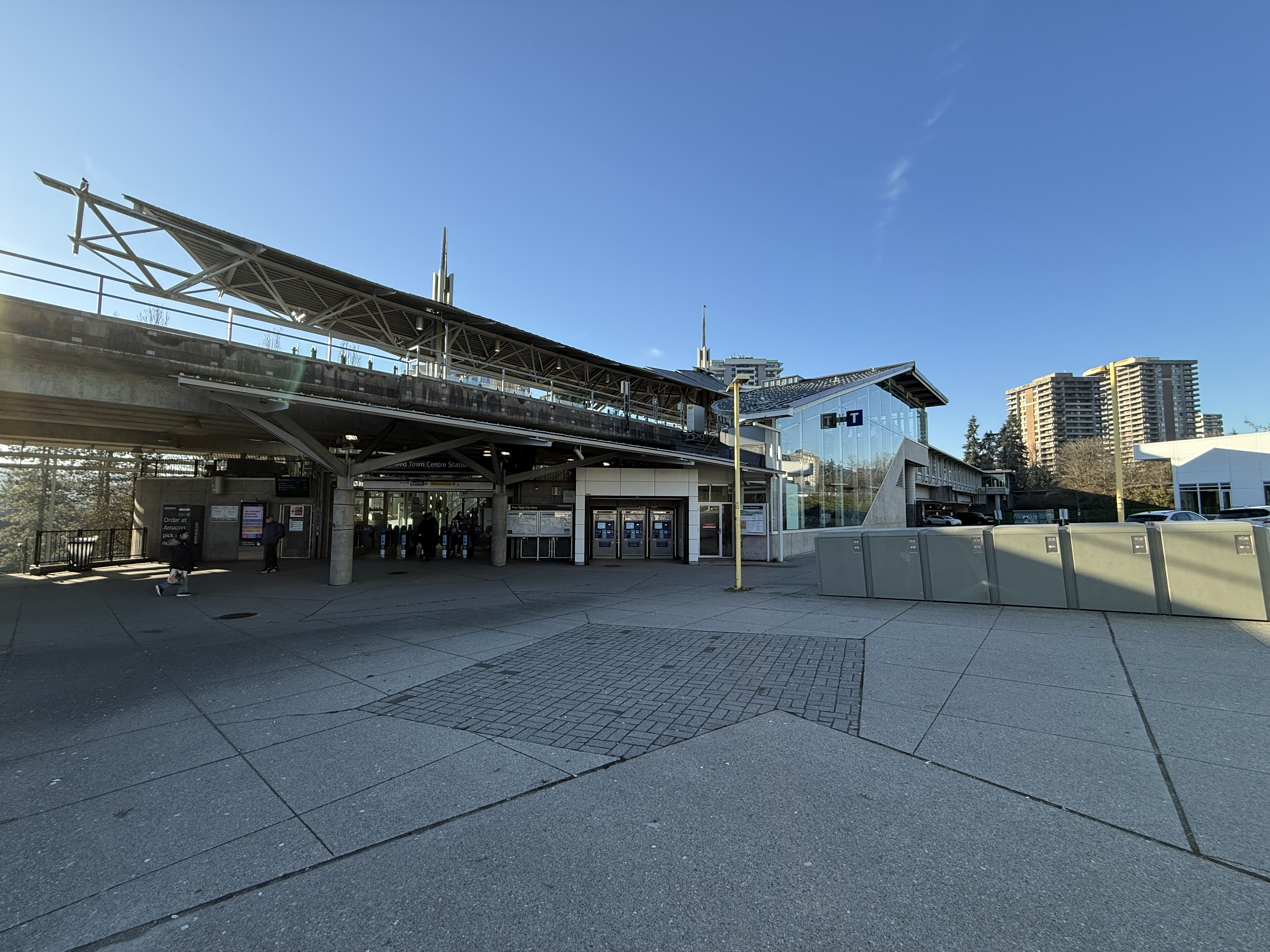
- Exterior of Lougheed Town Centre station

General information
- Location: 9755 Lougheed Highway, Burnaby
- Coordinates: 49.24846°N 122.89702°W
- System: SkyTrain station
- Owner: TransLink
- Platforms: Centre platform Side platform
- Tracks: 3
- Connections: BC Transit: 66 Fraser Valley Express

Construction
- Structure type: Elevated
- Accessible: yes
- Architect: Paul Merrick Architects

Other information
- Station code: LH
- Fare zone: 2

History
- Opened: August 31, 2002

Passengers
- 2025: 3,717,000 ▼1.5%
- Rank: 13 of 54

Services
Preceding station	TransLink	Following station
Braid towards Waterfront via Columbia	Expo Line Lougheed branch	Production Way–University Terminus
Production Way–University towards VCC–Clark	Millennium Line	Burquitlam towards Lafarge Lake–Douglas
Location

Lougheed Town Centre (sometimes abbreviated as Lougheed) is an elevated station on the Expo and Millennium Lines of Metro Vancouver's SkyTrain rapid transit system. The station is located at Lougheed Highway and Austin Road in Burnaby, British Columbia, Canada. Initially a Millennium Line station, a reorganization of SkyTrain service patterns in 2016 brought a branch of the Expo Line over the existing tracks to serve the station. It is one of three stations where transfer between the Expo Line and the Millennium Line is possible, the other two such points of transfer being Commercial–Broadway and Production Way–University stations.

The station is adjacent to a mid-size shopping mall, the City of Lougheed, formerly named "Lougheed Town Centre", from which the station drew its name. A Korean neighbourhood exists within walking distance of the south side of the station.

== History ==
Lougheed Town Centre station was opened in 2002 as part of the original Millennium Line project. The station was designed by the architecture firm Paul Merrick Architects.

An unfinished third platform had been roughed in on the east side of the station during its construction, in anticipation of a future connection for a SkyTrain extension to Coquitlam. The provincial government suspended plans for the extension in the early 2000s, and in the interim TransLink decided to use light rail technology for the alignment instead of Bombardier's Advanced Rapid Transit technology (as used on SkyTrain's Expo and Millennium Lines), which would have rendered the roughed-in platform and the adjacent switches obsolete.

In 2008, the provincial government announced new plans for the line, including a return to the use of SkyTrain technology. As a result, the third platform at the station would be built and used to connect to the Evergreen Extension stations. In 2012, construction began on the Evergreen Extension, which included the third platform at Lougheed Town Centre station.

In 2016, SkyTrain service was reconfigured in anticipation of the opening of the Evergreen Extension; as a result, Lougheed Town Centre station became a temporary terminus station of the Millennium Line on October 22, 2016, with service running between VCC–Clark station and this station. At the same time, the third platform at the station opened, and a new Expo Line branch running between Waterfront and Production Way–University stations was created to serve the station. When the Evergreen Extension opened on December 2, 2016, Lafarge Lake–Douglas station became the eastern Millennium Line terminus.

For the first 18 months of service on the Evergreen Extension, the third platform served eastbound trains while the northern half of the island platform served westbound trains (with Millennium Line trains running left-handed through the station); this measure allowed a cross-platform transfer between Millennium Line trains headed to VCC–Clark station and Expo Line trains headed to Waterfront station (via Columbia station). On June 25, 2018, normal right-hand running of Millennium Line trains through the station resumed, making it possible to do a cross-platform transfer between Expo Line trains headed for Production Way–University station and Millennium Line trains headed to Lafarge Lake–Douglas station.

== Services ==
The station is served by a bus loop and was the western terminus for the defunct 97 B-Line, which connected to Coquitlam Central station. Other bus connections to Burnaby, New Westminster, Port Moody, and Coquitlam areas make Lougheed Town Centre station a major transportation hub for the area and one of the busiest stations on the Millennium Line. On March 27, 2022, the Chilliwack Transit System moved the western terminus of BC Transit route 66 Fraser Valley Express to Lougheed Town Centre station, providing bus service to Abbotsford and Chilliwack.

== Station information ==
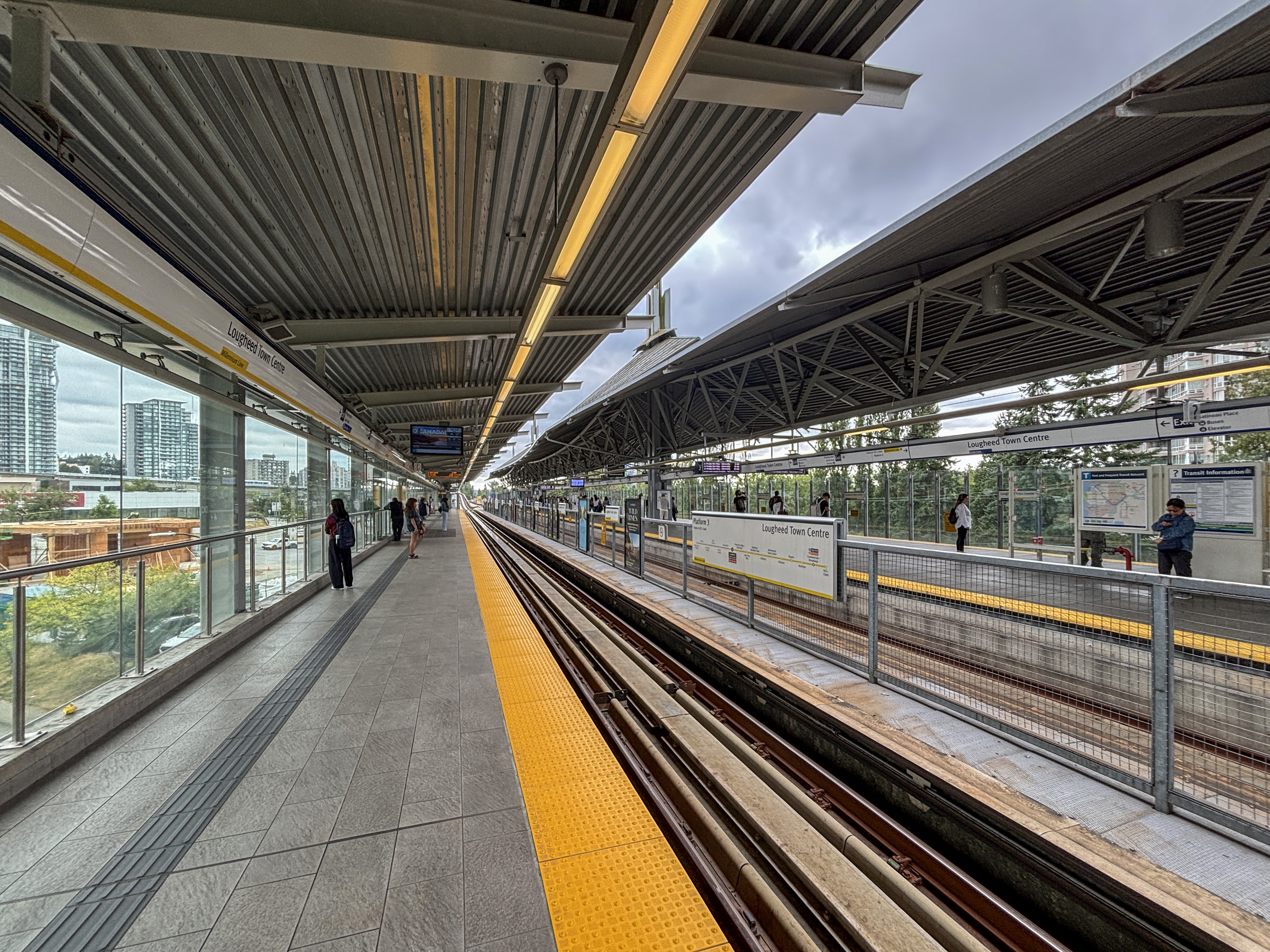
Platform 3 provides westbound Millennium Line service

=== Entrances ===
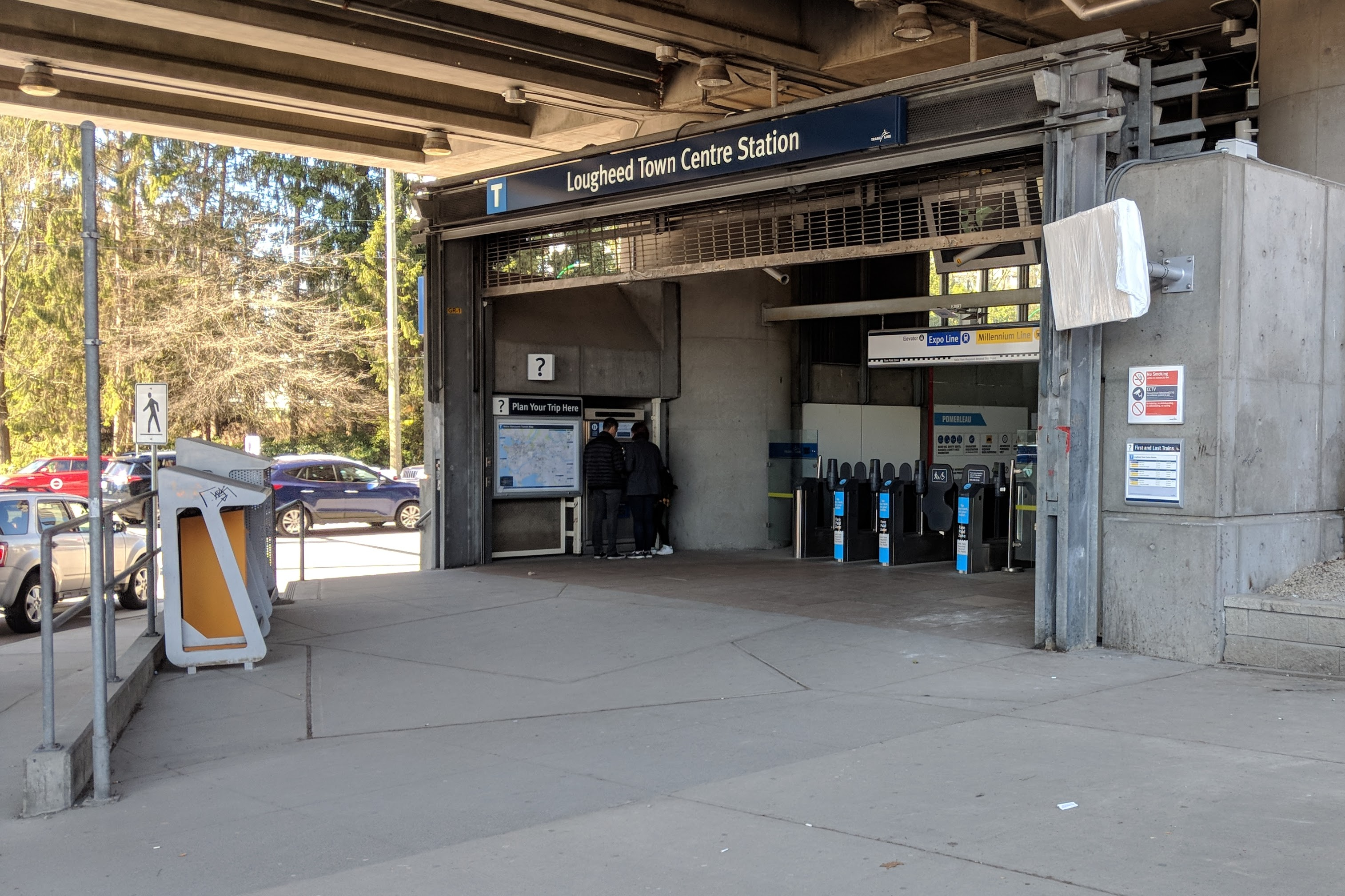
Austin Road entrance

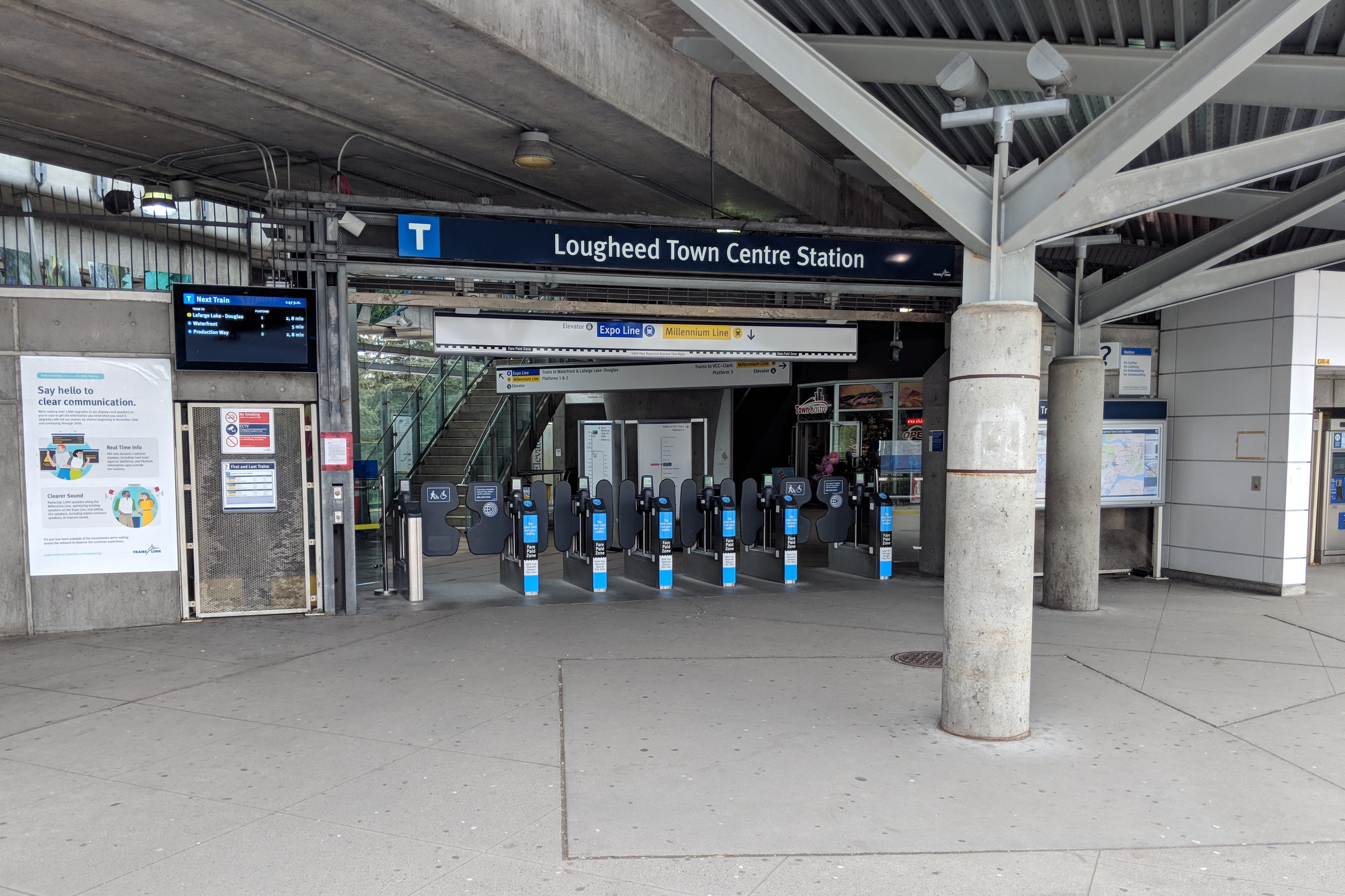
The entrance located on Gatineau Place is adjacent to the station's bus exchange

- Austin Road entrance: located at the west end of the station platform, with an elevator linking the street, concourse, and platform levels; however, there is no escalator between street and concourse level.
- Gatineau Place entrance: located at the east end of the station, connecting the platform with the bus loop at street level via elevators and both up and down escalators. Retail shops are present at this entrance. Bus and HandyDart drop-off areas are also located on Gatineau Place, in front of the station plaza.
- Mall entrance: located on the concourse level of the Austin Road entrance. It connects to the City of Lougheed via a weather-protected walkway through the mall parking lot.

=== Transit connections ===
Lougheed Town Centre station provides an off-street transit exchange in between Gatineau Place and Lougheed Highway. The station is close to the boundary of Burnaby (fare zone 2) and Coquitlam (fare zone 3). As of October 2026, bus bay assignments were as follows:

Bay	Routes	Notes
1	555 Carvolth Exchange	Express service
2	152 Coquitlam Central Station	
3	110 Metrotown Station	
4	101 22nd Street Station	
5	66 Fraser Valley Express (BC Transit route)	Operated by the Chilliwack Transit System connecting to Abbotsford, Chilliwack and Carvolth Exchange in Langley Township. Separate fare required.
6	180 Moody Centre Station	Via Glenayre
7	136 Brentwood Station	
8	157 Burquitlam Station	Via Poirier Community Centre
9	156 Braid Station	Via Poirier Community Centre
10	109 New Westminster Station	
10	N9 Downtown	NightBus service
10	N9 Coquitlam Central Station	NightBus service
