= History of the SkyTrain =

The SkyTrain rapid transit system in Greater Vancouver, Canada, was conceived as a legacy project of Expo 86 and was finished in time to showcase the fair's theme: "Transportation and Communication: World in Motion – World in Touch". Construction was funded by the provincial and federal governments. Vancouver had plans as early as the 1950s to build a monorail system, with modernist architect Wells Coates pencilled in to design it; that project was abandoned. The lack of a rapid transit system was said to be the cause of traffic problems in the 1970s, and the municipal government could not fund the construction of such a system. During the same period, Urban Transportation Development Corporation, then an Ontario crown corporation, was developing a new rapid transit technology known as an "Intermediate Capacity Transit System". In 1980, the need for rapid transit was great, and Ontario needed buyers for its new technology. "Advanced Light Rapid Transit" was selected to be built in Vancouver to showcase the Ontario project at Expo 86.

== Expo 86 and the Expo Line ==
Construction of the original line began on March 1, 1982, under the Social Credit government of Bill Bennett, who inaugurated the system at Waterfront station. SkyTrain opened on December 11, 1985, with free weekend service, and entered full revenue service on January 3, 1986.

Until 1989, the SkyTrain terminated at New Westminster station; in 1987, construction began on an extension including the Skybridge, Columbia station, and Scott Road station, extending the service to Surrey. The line was expanded yet again in 1994 with the opening of the Gateway, Surrey Central, and King George stations. SkyTrain was part of the 1996 Greater Vancouver Regional District's (GVRD) Livable Region Strategic Plan, which discussed strategies to deal with the anticipated increase of population in the region. These strategies included increasing transportation choices and transit use.

From 1989 to 1993, BC Transit had carried out an extensive analysis on rapid transit from Vancouver to Richmond. Close to a million dollars was spent by BC Transit carrying out engineering and cost estimates on various possible alignments. Routes in Vancouver such as Granville, Oak, Heather, Ontario and Main Street were all examined and eliminated. Recommended routes for the final assessment were the Cambie Street corridor and the Arbutus corridor. The final option selected was SkyTrain running along Cambie, but the Arbutus alignment was a strong contender from the point of view of cost and LRT technology. In about 1995, the provincial government changed its priorities, and announced a Broadway–Lougheed–New Westminster rapid transit route, with a future line to Coquitlam; this would be named the Millennium Line (with the original line from Waterfront to King George retroactively named the Expo Line). As part of that announcement, the Arbutus and Cambie Street corridors were shown as potential future rapid transit corridors from Vancouver to Richmond.

== Expansion ==
In 1997, negotiations began at the Greater Vancouver Regional District on transferring responsibility for SkyTrain from the province to the local governments after different visions emerged on how to cope with the growing region and the expansion line planned through the Lougheed area of Burnaby. In 1999, with the adoption of the Greater Vancouver Transportation Authority Act (now the South Coast British Columbia Transportation Authority Act), responsibility for SkyTrain, and ownership of SkyTrain's operating company, the British Columbia Rapid Transit Company, were transferred from BC Transit to the Greater Vancouver Transportation Authority, branded as TransLink. As part of the deal, the proponents agreed on a limited growth plan, with the province taking responsibility for expansion under the Crown corporation Rapid Transit Project 2000 (RTP 2000), and a cost-sharing scheme.

Transit expansion options for the rapidly growing region, which was outstripping TransLink's capacity, included streetcars, rapid buses, and light rapid transit, which were passed over in favour of new SkyTrain lines. RTP 2000 proposed a two-phase expansion: a $1.2-billion Millennium Line from New Westminster to Vancouver Community College via Lougheed Town Centre in Phase I; and a $73-million Coquitlam line from Lougheed Mall to Coquitlam Centre via Port Moody, and a Western Line from Vancouver Community College to Granville Street via the Broadway corridor, both to be completed before 2006, in Phase II.

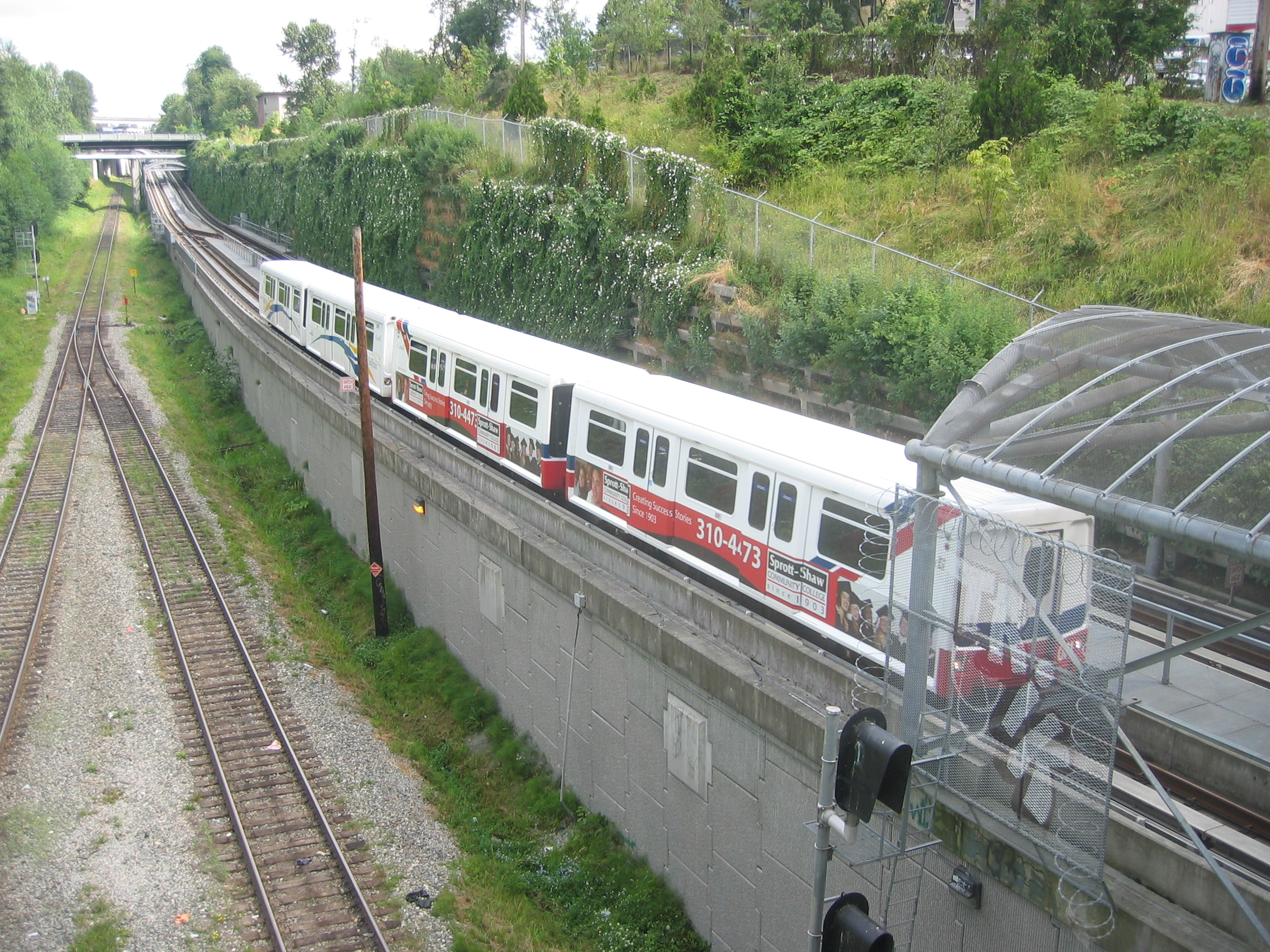
A MK I train passing by on the Millennium Line, between VCC–Clark station and Commercial–Broadway station (2006)

The first section of the Millennium Line opened in 2002, with the addition of two stations, Braid and Sapperton. Most of the remaining portion began operating later that year, serving North Burnaby and East Vancouver. Phase I of the Millennium Line was completed $50 million under budget. Critics of the project dubbed it the "SkyTrain to Nowhere", claiming that the route of the new line was based on political concerns, not the needs of commuters. One illustration of the legitimacy of this complaint was that the end of the Millennium Line was located in a vacant field, originally chosen because it was supposed to be the location for a new high-tech development and was close to the head office of QLT Inc., but additional development was slow to materialize. That station, VCC–Clark near Clark Drive and Broadway, did not open until 2006 because of difficulty in negotiating the right-of-way from BNSF Railway, but it was still five kilometres (3.1 mi) short of the original proposed Phase II terminus at Granville Street.

By 1998, plans for a line to Richmond resurfaced, including a spur to the Vancouver International Airport, in part to strengthen Vancouver's planned bid for the 2010 Winter Olympics. Equal shares of funding were obtained from the federal and provincial governments, as well as the airport authority. The Richmond line contradicted TransLink's stated priority of building Phase II of the Millennium Line to Coquitlam, and TransLink's board twice rejected using the offered funding to build the line to Richmond, then narrowly approved it in a third vote in 2004. The new line was named the Canada Line to acknowledge the federal government's contribution.

=== Canada Line ===
The Canada Line was built as a public–private partnership, with the winning bidder, led by SNC-Lavalin (now known as ProTransBC), contributing funds toward its construction and operating it for 35 years. TransLink guaranteed ProTransBC a minimum ridership. The Canada Line opened on August 17, 2009, 15 weeks ahead of schedule and on budget. Ridership rose three years ahead of forecasts, hitting 100,000 passengers per weekday in May 2010 and 110,000 passengers per weekday in February 2011. The Canada Line is operationally independent from the Expo and Millennium Lines and uses rolling stock that is incompatible with the other lines, but it is still considered to be part of the SkyTrain network.

=== Evergreen Extension ===
The Evergreen Extension (previously known as the Evergreen Line and, prior to that, part of the Millennium Line Phase II project) is a 10.9-kilometre-long (6.8 mi) extension of the Millennium Line. It extended the SkyTrain network from Lougheed Town Centre in Burnaby to Lafarge Lake–Douglas in Coquitlam, with the addition of six new stations and major upgrades to two existing stations (Commercial–Broadway station and Lougheed Town Centre). It opened on December 2, 2016.

=== Broadway Extension ===
The Broadway Extension will extend the Millennium Line west from VCC–Clark station to a new terminus, Arbutus station. The $2.83-billion extension will be 5.7 kilometres (3.5 mi) long, mainly underground, and feature five new stations. Major construction began in May 2021. It is expected to open in 2027.

=== Surrey–Langley extension ===
The $6-billion, 16-kilometre (9.9 mi) Surrey–Langley extension was proposed in December 2018. It will extend the Expo Line east from King George Station to Langley City Centre station. Major construction started in November 2024; the extension includes 8 new stations. It is expected to open in the fourth quarter of 2029.

=== Timeline of SkyTrain construction ===
Project name	Line(s)	Opened	Section	Stations	Length	Cost/km (millions)
Demonstration line	Expo	Summer 1983	Main Street station Terminal Ave guideway	1	1 km	N/A
Expo Phase I	Expo	January 3, 1986	Waterfront – New Westminster	15	20.4 km	$82.66
Expo Phase II	Expo	February 14, 1989	New Westminster – Columbia	2	2.9 km	$101.72
Expo Phase II	Expo	March 16, 1990	Columbia – Scott Road	2	2.9 km	$101.72
Surrey Extension	Expo	March 28, 1994	Scott Road – King George	3	4.4 km	$57.03
Millennium Phase I	Millennium	January 2, 2002	Columbia – Braid	12	19.1 km	$61.68
Millennium Phase I	Millennium	August 31, 2002	Braid – Commercial Drive	12	19.1 km	$61.68
Millennium Phase I	Millennium	November 21, 2003	Lake City Way station added	12	19.1 km	$61.68
VCC–Clark Extension	Millennium	January 6, 2006	Commercial Drive – VCC–Clark	1	0.8 km	$61.68
Canada Line	Canada	August 17, 2009	Waterfront – Richmond–Brighouse; Waterfront – YVR–Airport	15	19.2 km	$99.47
Evergreen Extension	Millennium	December 2, 2016	Lougheed Town Centre – Lafarge Lake–Douglas	6	10.9 km	$128.44
Capstan station	Canada	December 20, 2024	Bridgeport – Aberdeen	1	N/A	$62

== Impact ==
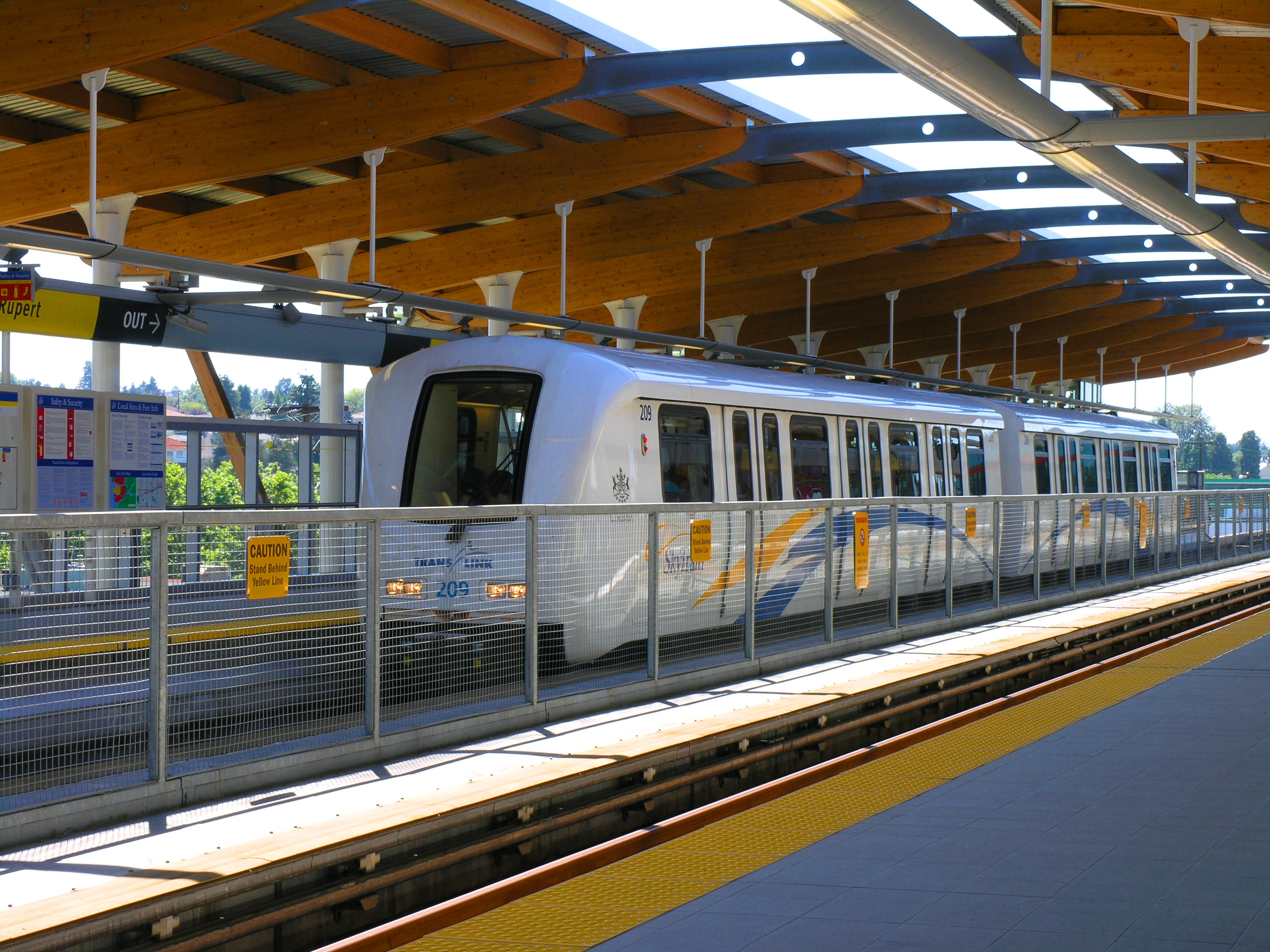
A first-generation Mark II SkyTrain at Rupert station, Millennium Line (2005)

The SkyTrain system has had a significant impact on the development of areas near stations and has helped to shape urban density in Metro Vancouver. Between 1991 and 2001, the population living within 500 metres (1,600 ft) of a SkyTrain station increased by 37 per cent, compared to the regional average of 24 per cent. From the system's opening, the total population of the service area rose from 400,000 to 1.3 million people. According to BC Transit's document SkyTrain: A catalyst for development, more than $5 billion of private money had been invested within a 10–15 minute walking distance of the SkyTrain and SeaBus. The report claimed that those two modes of transportation were the driving force of the investment, though it did not disaggregate the general growth in that area.

According to Graham R. Crampton, SkyTrain and San Diego's trolley system were among the most successful transit systems in three areas: stimulation of growth in city centres; stimulation of growth in declining areas; and change in the pattern of urban development. Vancouver's system was particularly impressive, according to E. Babalik:

The most effective system in terms of shaping urban growth is SkyTrain. The corridor that SkyTrain runs through became the main development axis of Vancouver with a notably denser urban form after the opening of SkyTrain. Development densities along SkyTrain route have changed especially as a result of the rezoning plans of the municipalities. These plans increased the densities at station areas, and encouraged office and retail centres at stations. Some of the SkyTrain stations became the 'new town centres' as proposed in the metropolitan development plan.

Larry Ward, former president and CEO of British Columbia Rapid Transit Corporation, told Goliath that public reaction to the Millennium Line was positive; customers enjoyed the spaciousness of the Mark II cars, the brighter station colours, and the general ambiance. When Broadway station opened in 1985, it caused disruption to business south of the station. In an effort to provide redress for the damage done, The Hub was created in 2003 when the adjacent Commercial Drive station opened. The Hub is a strip of retail businesses within Commercial Drive station, a transfer point between the Expo and Millennium lines. Almost 50,000 people pass through the intersection every business day.

The Canada Line was credited with spurring transit-oriented development in Richmond, where 40,000 residents live within 400 metres (1,300 ft) of the line. The City of Richmond planned to add 80,000 more residents to its city centre by 2031, concentrated in five high-density neighbourhoods surrounding the city's Canada Line stations. The City of Vancouver has been slower to adopt a SkyTrain-related growth strategy: its Cambie Corridor Planning Program, which was to be completed by 2011, intended to produce a coordinated strategy for the entire corridor, as well as policies for what the city called "strategic sites".

== Controversies ==
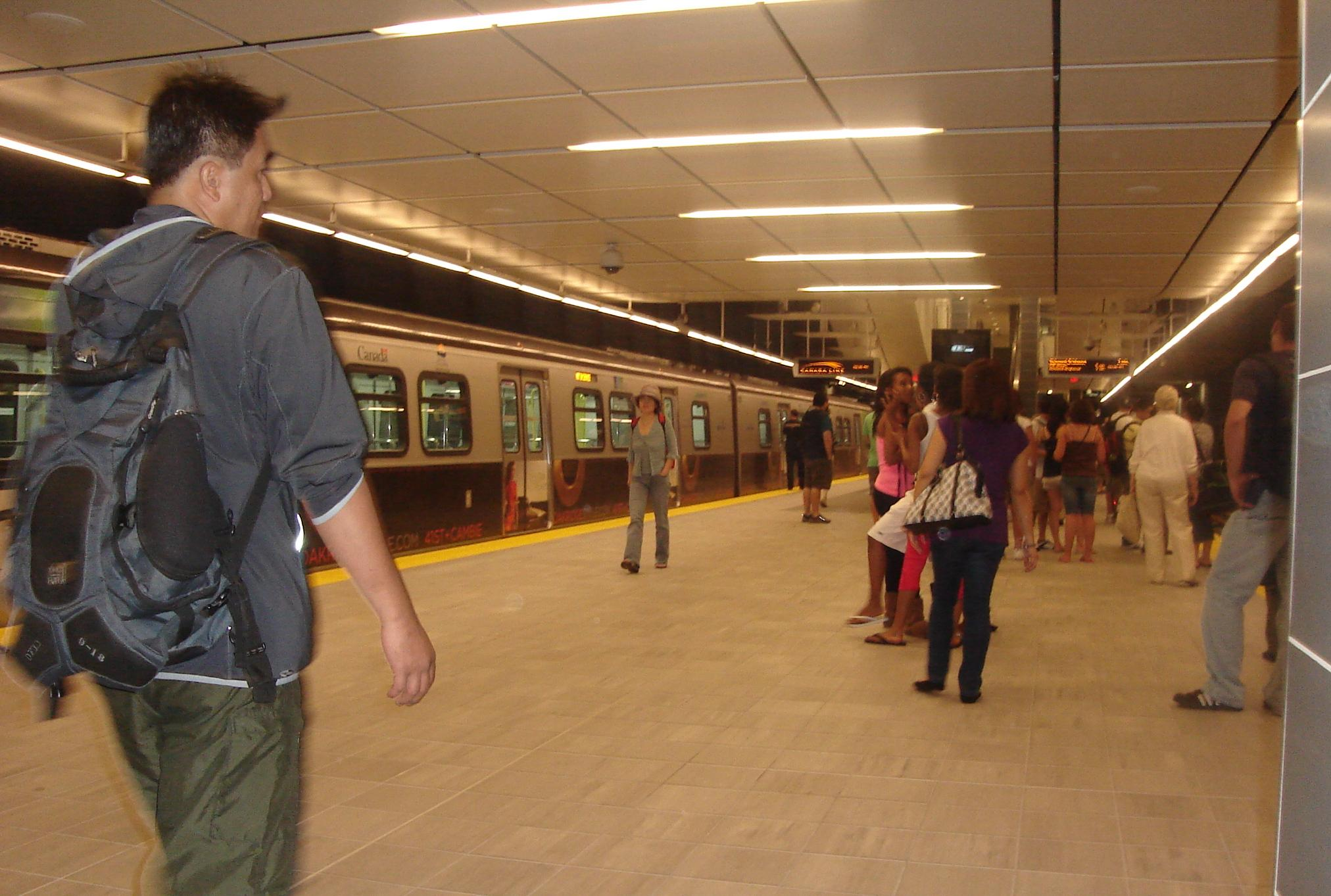
A Canada Line train at Waterfront station in Downtown Vancouver (2009)

=== Technology choice ===
The choice of SkyTrain technology to provide rapid transit in the Metro Vancouver region has not gone unchallenged. A survey conducted by Canadian Facts for the Rapid Transit Project and released in 1998, eight days after Premier Glen Clark stated his preferred technology choice for connecting Coquitlam Centre to Vancouver was SkyTrain, found that:

- 61 percent of Greater Vancouver residents were "more likely" to support the construction of SkyTrain than ground-level light rail transit;
- 71 percent said that "even though SkyTrain is more expensive to build, it is better than ground LRT";
- 69 percent felt that SkyTrain would have the largest impact on traffic reduction, followed by either transit links (54 per cent), rapid buses on dedicated lanes such as those used for the B-Line bus routes (40 per cent), and less expensive LRT lines (32 per cent);
- 51 percent said the terminus should have been at UBC, followed by Granville Street (24 per cent) and Commercial–Broadway station (17 per cent);
- 63 percent said that SkyTrain was the best mode of transportation, followed by the bus system (24 per cent), the West Coast Express (3 per cent) and the SeaBus (1 per cent).

Deming Smith of the Society Promoting Environmental Conservation believed that the selection of SkyTrain was politically charged, because construction workers would vote for Glen Clark's party, the British Columbia New Democratic Party, for providing them with employment.

=== Debt ===
The system had debt problems in 1998. The debt servicing of SkyTrain was three and a half times the actual operating budget, whereas the debt servicing of buses was only one-seventh the operating budget. During construction of the Surrey extension, the Vancouver Regional Transit Commission, a division of BC Transit, was $30 million in debt. The provincial government agreed to cover the debt in 1991 for three years.

=== Environmental impacts ===
In May 2001, protesters halted construction of the Millennium Line in an attempt to save the trees and vegetation within the Grandview Cut. TransLink scrapped the original plan of building a tunnel in favour of a guideway. The bridge over the cut was consequently out of service from April to December 2001. It disrupted bus service and several local businesses, including Canada Post, a hairdressing school, and a restaurant, which experienced a $5,000-per-month loss of revenue. The owner appealed to city hall and the Millennium Line Rapid Transit Project Office for compensation, and complained to Premier Ujjal Dosanjh and Deputy Premier Joy MacPhail. Dosanjh sent her a letter saying he would pass her concerns on to Economic Development minister Mike Farnworth. MacPhail declined compensation and said the Nanaimo Bridge construction project was a "necessary evil".

=== Disruption to local businesses ===
Construction of the Canada Line raised concerns over the disruption of local business near Yaletown, Cambie Street, and No. 3 Road in Richmond. InTransitBC, the construction consortium, responded by launching an advertising campaign promoting local business on the line. Residents of Cambie Street opposed the building of the Canada Line on their street and advocated instead for the line to be built down the Arbutus corridor, which is zoned for rail transit. Officials said that Cambie was preferred because the line is shorter and covers more important and trafficked destinations that can generate more revenue, like Vancouver General Hospital, Vancouver City Hall, Oakridge Centre, and Langara College. Vancouver mayor Gregor Robertson was a strong supporter of Cambie Street merchants and spoke regularly about hardships arising from the Canada Line construction. He called the handling of the rail line construction an "injustice". On March 23, 2009, Robertson testified in a lawsuit by a Cambie Street merchant in the BC Supreme Court regarding damage to her business from the construction. The merchant was awarded $600,000 by the court, which ruled that there was insufficient action to mitigate the effects of Canada Line construction on Cambie Street merchants. When the Canada Line opened on August 17, 2009, Robertson said Greater Vancouver needed more rapid transit, but that the Canada Line was a "great start" and that he was a "Johnny-come-lately" to the project.
