= Broadway–City Hall station =

Metro Vancouver SkyTrain station

Broadway–City Hall
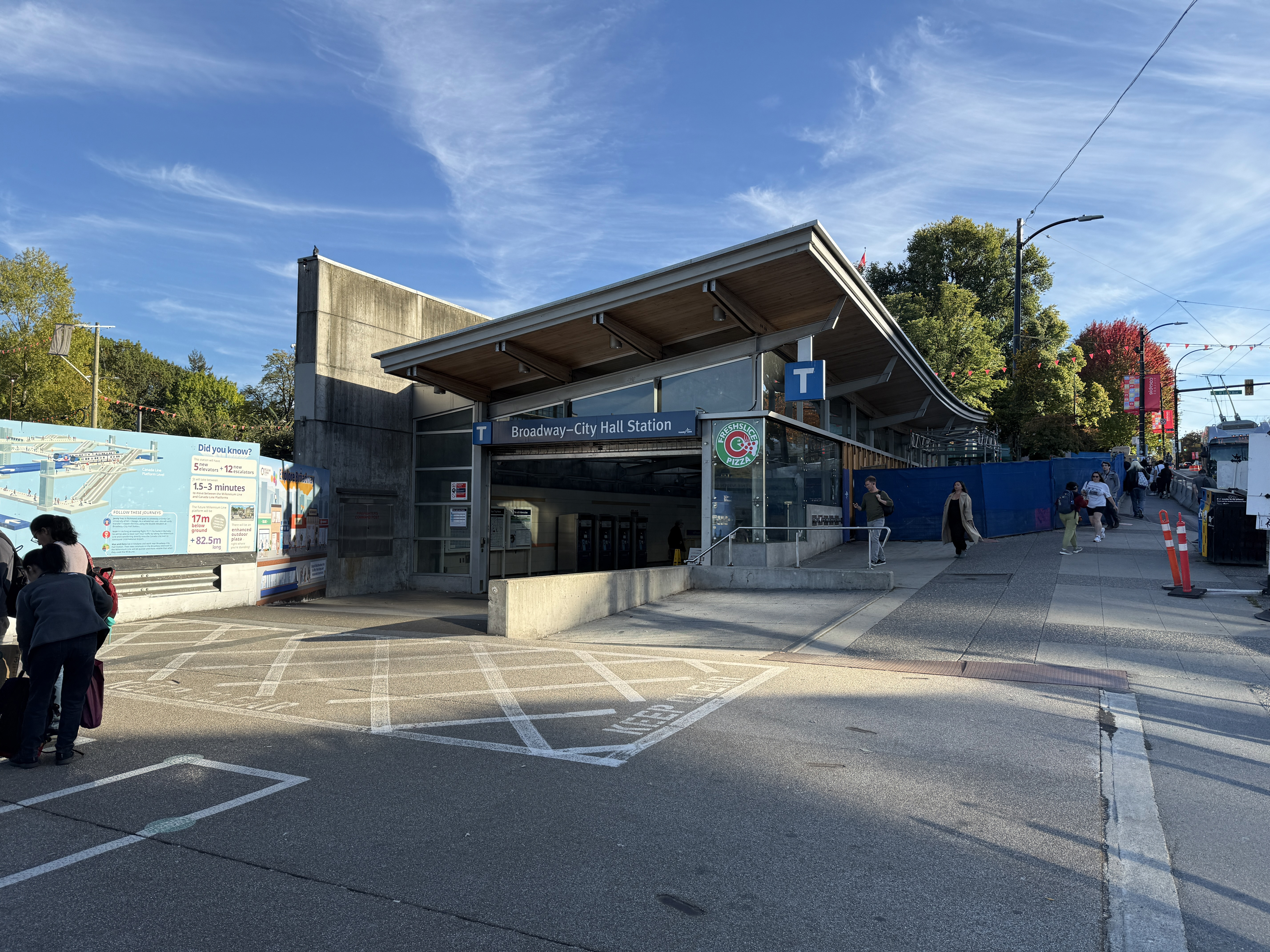
- Broadway–City Hall station entrance in 2025

General information
- Location: 496 West Broadway, Vancouver
- Coordinates: 49°15′46″N 123°6′52″W
- System: SkyTrain station
- Owner: TransLink
- Platforms: Side platforms
- Tracks: 2
- Connections: 99 B-Line

Construction
- Structure type: Subway
- Accessible: yes
- Architect: VIA Architecture

Other information
- Station code: BC
- Fare zone: 1

History
- Opened: August 17, 2009

Passengers
- 2025: 3,559,000 ▲0.7%
- Rank: 16 of 54

Services
Preceding station	TransLink	Following station
Olympic Village towards Waterfront	Canada Line	King Edward towards Richmond–Brighouse or YVR–Airport
Future services
Oak–VGH towards Arbutus	Millennium Line Broadway extension (opens 2027)	Mount Pleasant towards Lafarge Lake–Douglas
Location

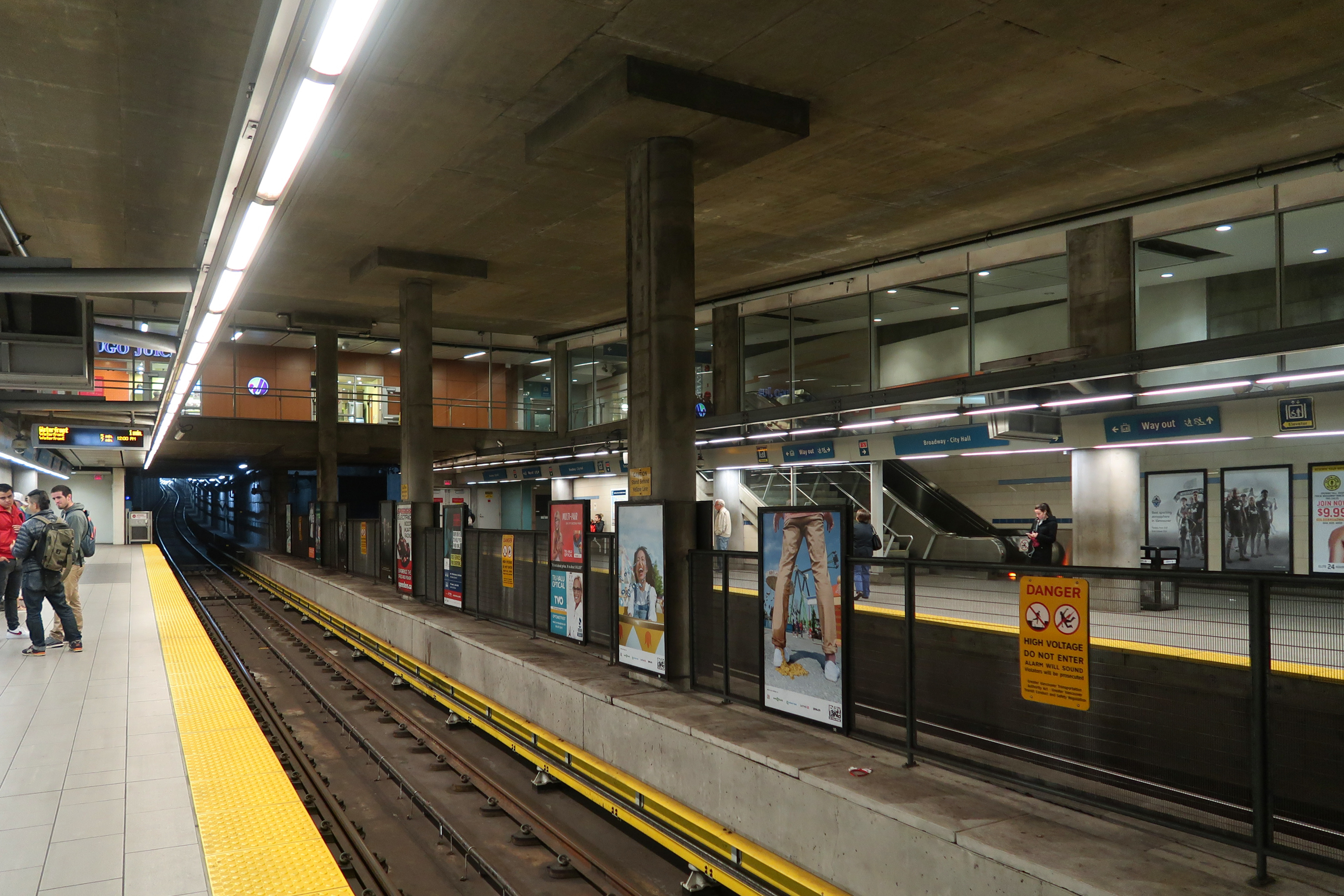
Broadway–City Hall's platform level

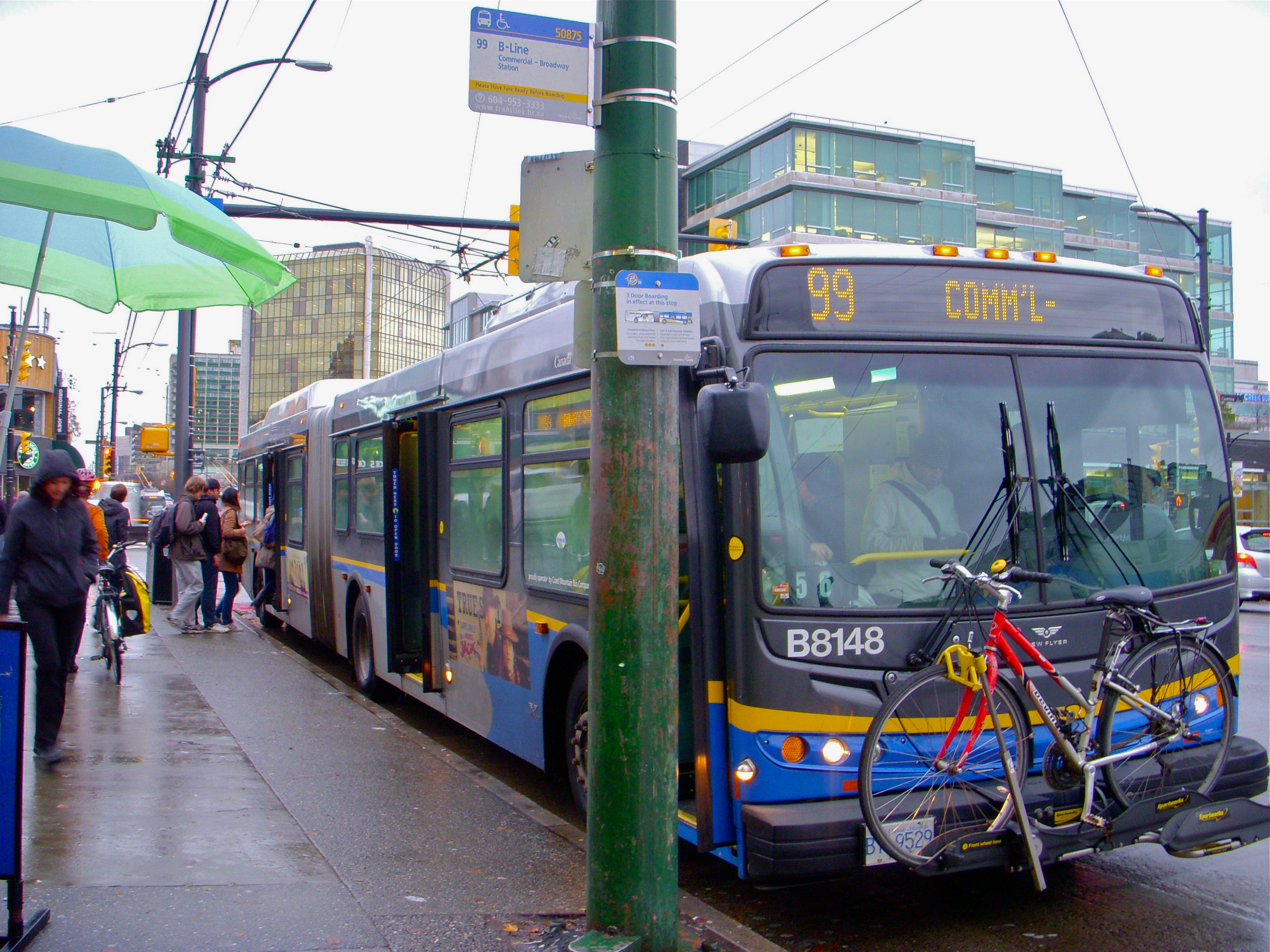
An eastbound 99 B-Line with service to Commercial–Broadway

Broadway–City Hall is an underground station on the Canada Line of Metro Vancouver's SkyTrain rapid transit system. The station is located at the intersection of West Broadway and Cambie Street in Vancouver, British Columbia and is within walking distance of Vancouver City Hall, City Square Shopping Centre, Vancouver General Hospital and related facilities, as well as the surrounding Fairview and Mount Pleasant neighbourhoods.

== History ==
Broadway–City Hall station was opened in 2009, along with the rest of the Canada Line. The station features large double-height ceilings over the platform area and was designed by the architecture firm VIA Architecture.

In 2018, it was confirmed that the Millennium Line would be extended from its current terminus at VCC–Clark station west to Arbutus Street, with a potential future terminus at the University of British Columbia. When completed, Broadway–City Hall station will become a transfer point on the Broadway extension as the station was designed with a "knock-out" panel on the mezzanine level to provide a connection to the Millennium Line platforms under Broadway. Originally scheduled to open in 2025, the opening of the new platforms has been pushed back twice and, as of May 2024, it is scheduled to open in late 2027.

== Services ==
Broadway–City Hall station is served by a number of bus routes, including the #9 trolleybus route providing east–west local service along Broadway, the #15 serving Cambie Street, and the 99 B-Line operating east to Commercial–Broadway station and west to the University of British Columbia (UBC).

== Station information ==
=== Entrances ===
Broadway–City Hall is served by a single entrance at the southeast corner of Cambie Street and West Broadway. The 99 B-Line to Commercial–Broadway station stops in front of this entrance.

The Crossroads development at the northwest corner of Cambie Street and West Broadway was required by the City of Vancouver to provide space for an entrance to the station. This entrance has yet to be built.

=== Transit connections ===
The following bus routes can be found in close proximity to Broadway–City Hall station:

Bay	Location	Routes
1	Broadway; Eastbound	99 B-Line to Commercial–Broadway Station; N9 Coquitlam Central Station (NightBus service)
2	Cambie Street; Northbound	15 Olympic Village Station; 17 Downtown N15 Downtown (NightBus service)
3	Cambie Street; Southbound	15 Cambie; 17 Oak N15 Cambie (NightBus service)
4	Broadway; Westbound	99 B-Line to UBC; N9 Downtown (NightBus service)
5	Broadway; Westbound	9 Alma; N9 Downtown (NightBus service)
6	Broadway; Eastbound	9 Boundary
