= Mount Pleasant station (SkyTrain) =

Metro Vancouver SkyTrain station

Mount Pleasant
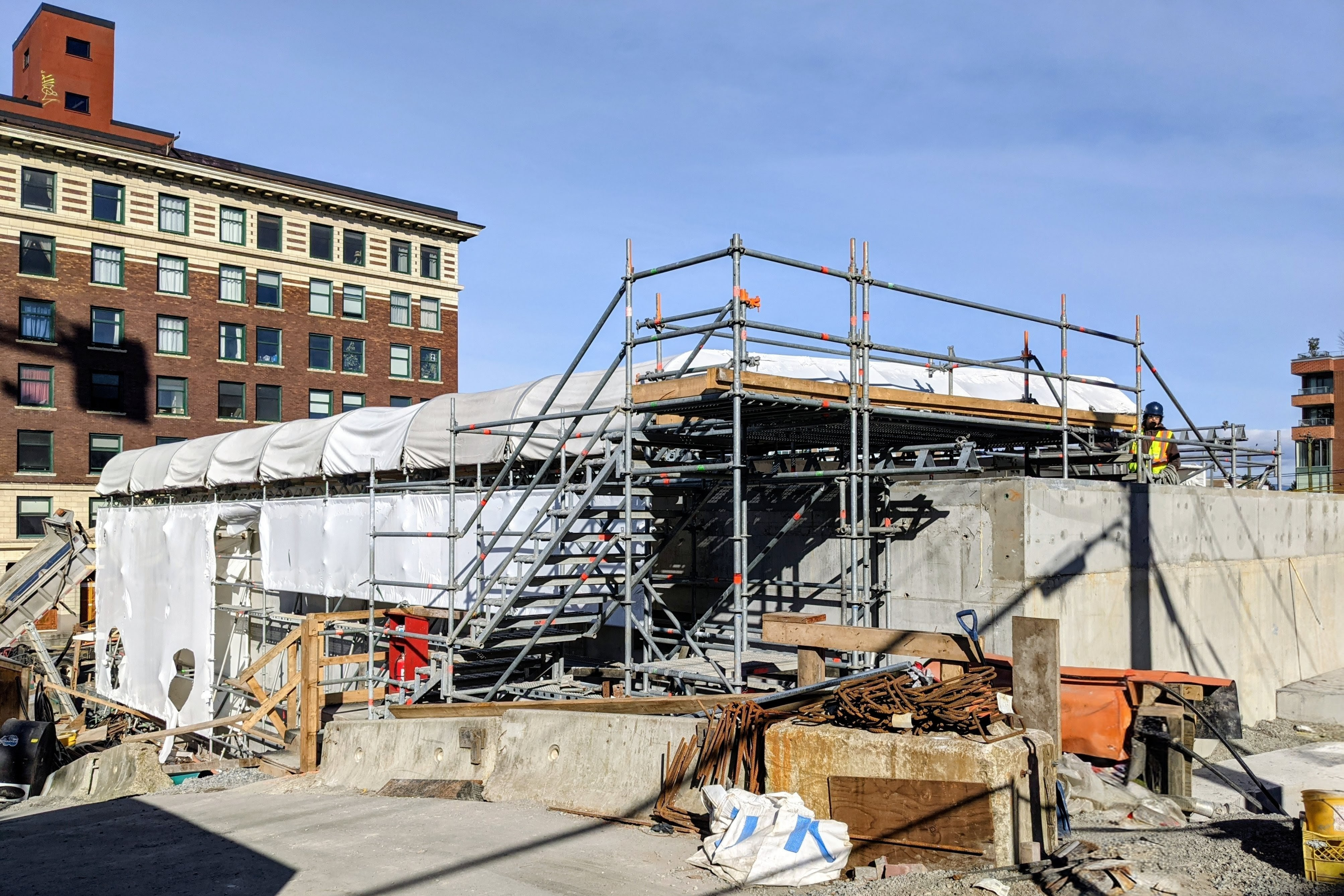
- Construction of the headhouse in February 2026

General information
- Location: Vancouver
- Coordinates: 49.262677°N 123.101419°W
- System: SkyTrain station
- Owner: TransLink
- Platforms: Centre platform
- Tracks: 2

Construction
- Structure type: Subway
- Accessible: Yes

Other information
- Status: Under construction
- Fare zone: 1

History
- Opening: 2027 (1 year's time)

Services
Preceding station	TransLink	Following station
Broadway–City Hall towards Arbutus	Millennium Line Broadway extension (opens 2027)	Great Northern Way–Emily Carr towards Lafarge Lake–Douglas
Location

Mount Pleasant is an underground station under construction on the Millennium Line of Metro Vancouver's SkyTrain rapid transit system. It is being built on the southwest corner of the intersection of East Broadway and Main Street in the Mount Pleasant neighbourhood of Vancouver, British Columbia, Canada. Originally scheduled to open in 2025, the station's projected opening has been pushed back twice; as of May 2024, it is scheduled to open in late 2027.
