= Great Northern Way–Emily Carr station =

Metro Vancouver SkyTrain station

Great Northern Way–Emily Carr
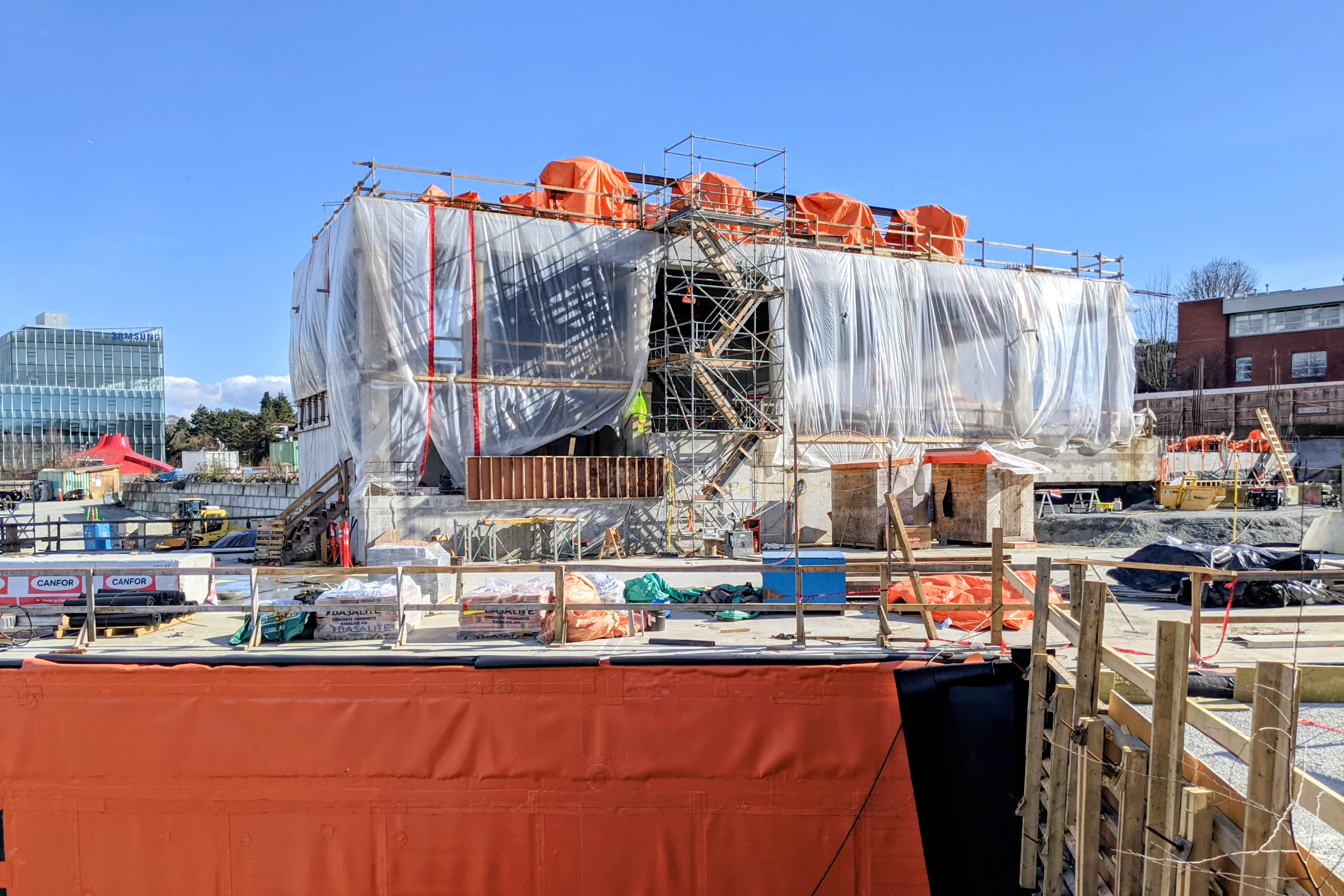
- Construction of the headhouse in February 2026

General information
- Location: Vancouver
- Coordinates: 49.267032°N 123.094822°W
- System: SkyTrain station
- Owner: TransLink
- Platforms: Centre platform
- Tracks: 2

Construction
- Structure type: Subway
- Accessible: Yes

Other information
- Status: Under construction
- Fare zone: 1

History
- Opening: 2027 (1 year's time)
- Former names: Great Northern Way (planning)

Services
Preceding station	TransLink	Following station
Mount Pleasant towards Arbutus	Millennium Line Broadway extension (opens 2027)	VCC–Clark towards Lafarge Lake–Douglas
Location

Great Northern Way–Emily Carr is an underground station under construction on the Millennium Line of Metro Vancouver's SkyTrain rapid transit system. It is being built at the intersection of Great Northern Way and Thornton Street adjacent to the Emily Carr University of Art and Design in the Strathcona neighbourhood of Vancouver, British Columbia, Canada. Originally scheduled to open in 2025, the station's projected opening has been pushed back twice; as of May 2024, it is scheduled to open in late 2027.

During planning, the station was known simply as Great Northern Way. On September 17, 2020, the station was renamed to include reference to Emily Carr University.

== Structure and design ==
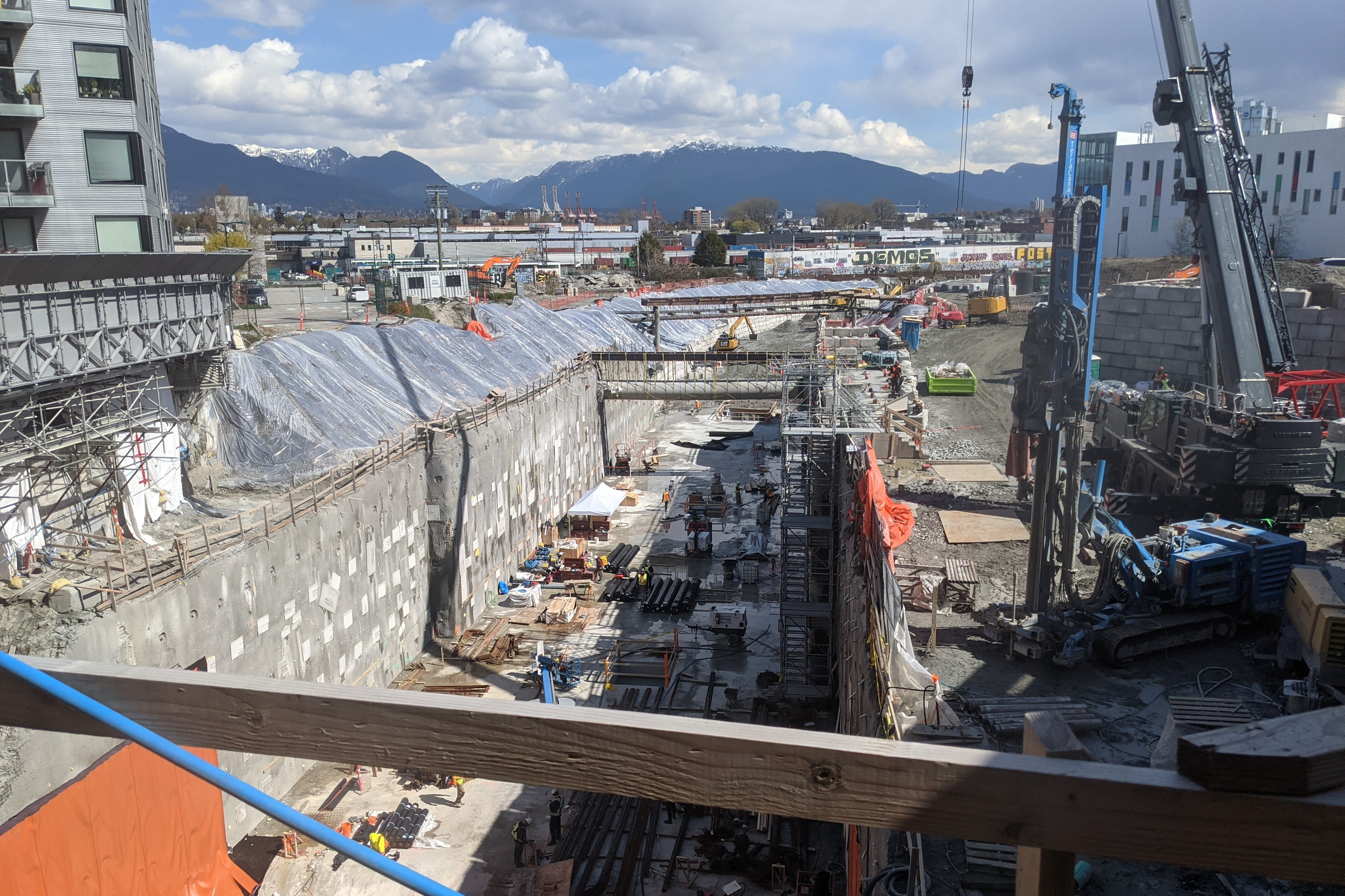
Staging pit for the tunnel boring machines in April 2022

Similar to Olympic Village station, Great Northern Way–Emily Carr is being built in the staging pit used for the two tunnel boring machines.
