= Oak–VGH station =

Metro Vancouver SkyTrain station

Oak–VGH
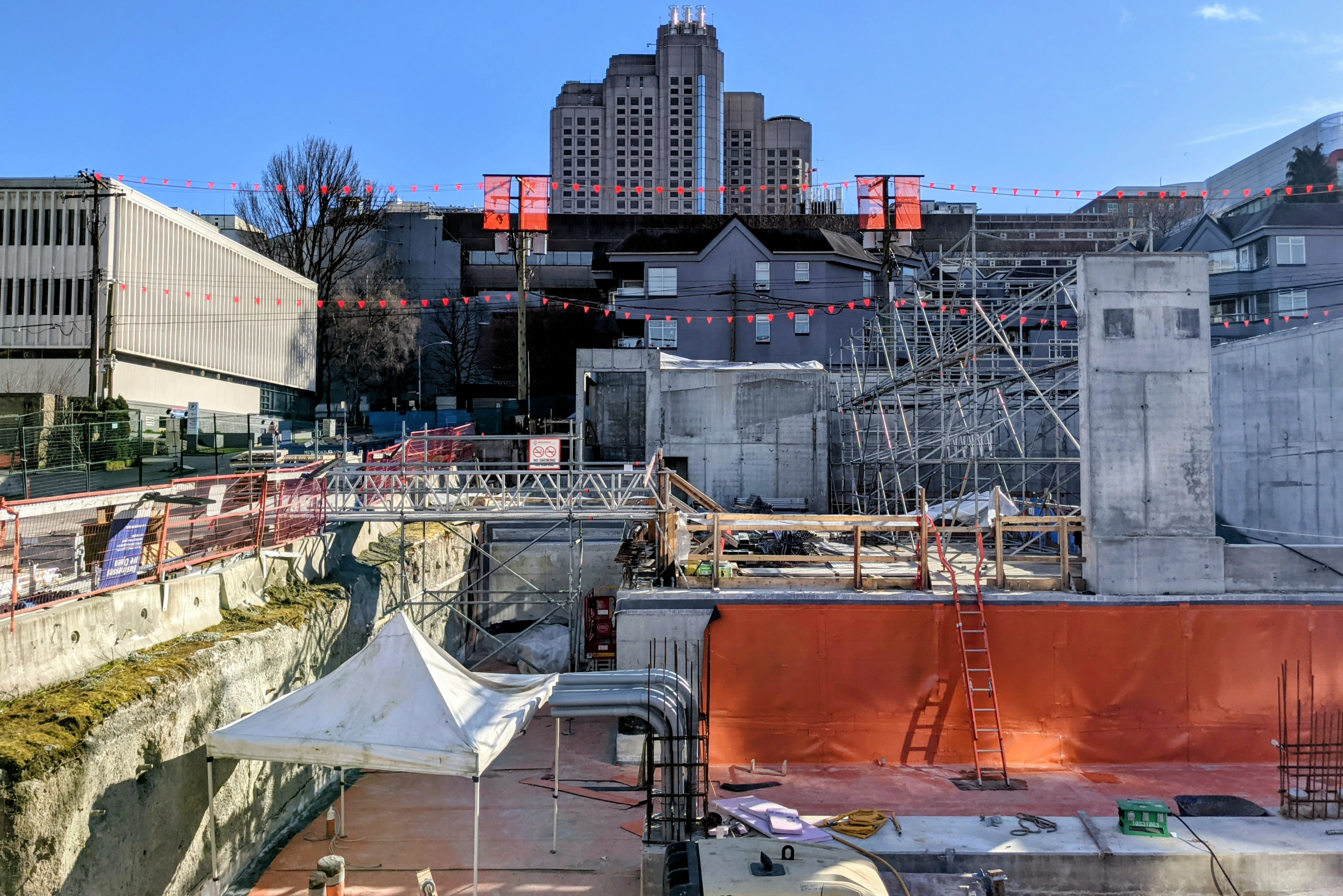
- Construction of the headhouse in February 2026

General information
- Location: Vancouver
- Coordinates: 49.263328°N 123.124357°W
- System: SkyTrain station
- Owner: TransLink
- Platforms: Centre platform
- Tracks: 2

Construction
- Structure type: Subway
- Accessible: Yes

Other information
- Status: Under construction
- Fare zone: 1

History
- Opening: 2027 (1 year's time)
- Former names: Fairview–VGH (planning)

Services
Preceding station	TransLink	Following station
South Granville towards Arbutus	Millennium Line Broadway extension (opens 2027)	Broadway–City Hall towards Lafarge Lake–Douglas
Location

Oak–VGH is an underground station under construction on the Millennium Line of Metro Vancouver's SkyTrain rapid transit system. It will be located at the southwest corner of the intersection of West Broadway and Laurel Street near Vancouver General Hospital in the Fairview neighbourhood of Vancouver, British Columbia, Canada. Originally scheduled to open in 2025, the station's projected opening has been pushed back twice; as of May 2024, it is scheduled to open in late 2027.

During planning, the station was known as Fairview–VGH. On September 17, 2020, the station was renamed to include reference to the nearby Oak Street, only one block west of the station.
