= Broadway Subway =

Broadway Subway may refer to:

== Lines ==
=== United States ===
- Broadway Subway (IRT), a New York City subway line
- Broadway Subway (BMT), a New York City subway line

=== Canada ===
- Broadway Subway Project, an extension of the Millennium Line in Vancouver, British Columbia
