= South Granville station =

Metro Vancouver SkyTrain station

South Granville
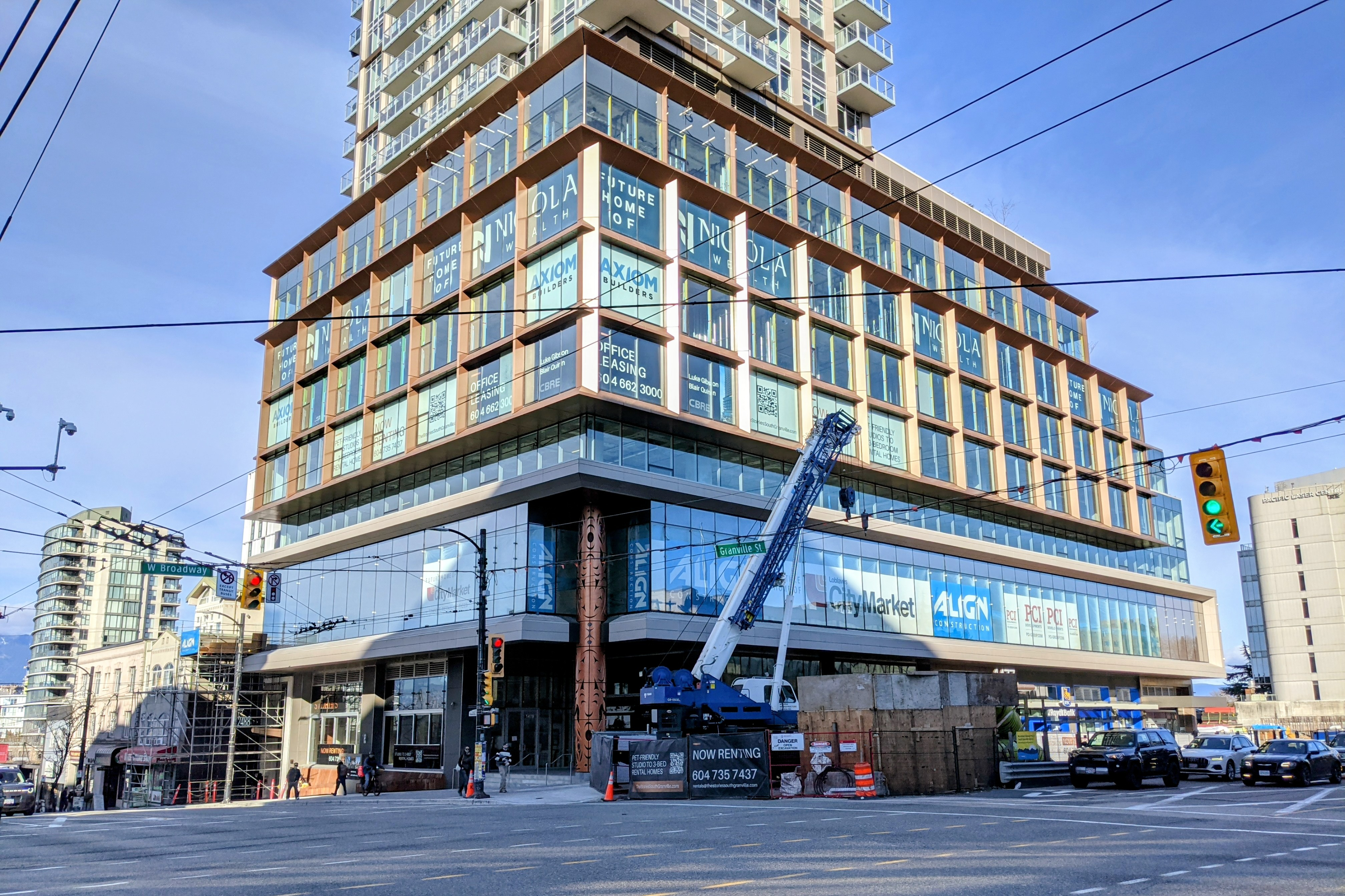
- 1477 West Broadway in February 2026. It will house the entrance to South Granville.

General information
- Location: Vancouver
- Coordinates: 49.263801°N 123.138253°W
- System: SkyTrain station
- Owner: TransLink
- Platforms: Centre platform
- Tracks: 2

Construction
- Structure type: Subway
- Accessible: Yes

Other information
- Status: Under construction
- Fare zone: 1

History
- Opening: 2027 (1 year's time)

Services
Preceding station	TransLink	Following station
Arbutus Terminus	Millennium Line Broadway extension (opens 2027)	Oak–VGH towards Lafarge Lake–Douglas
Location

South Granville is an underground station under construction on the Millennium Line of Metro Vancouver's SkyTrain rapid transit system. It will be located at the northeast corner of the intersection of West Broadway and Granville Street in the South Granville area on the border of the Fairview and Kitsilano neighbourhoods in Vancouver, British Columbia, Canada. Originally scheduled to open in 2025, the station's projected opening has been pushed back twice; as of May 2024, it is scheduled to open in late 2027.
