= VCC–Clark station =

Metro Vancouver SkyTrain station

VCC–Clark
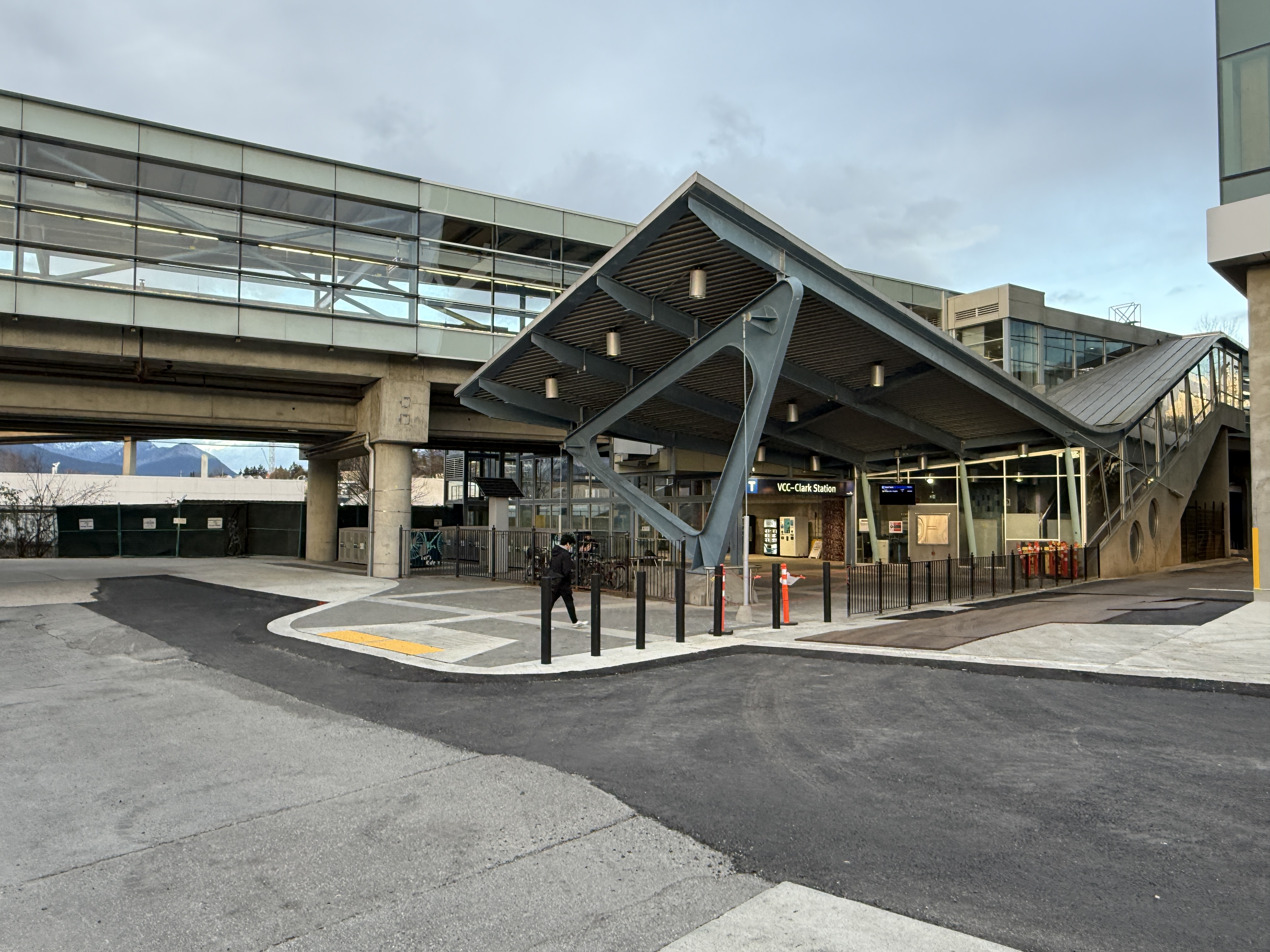
- VCC–Clark station in 2026

General information
- Location: 2102 Keith Drive, Vancouver
- Coordinates: 49.265753°N 123.078825°W
- System: SkyTrain station
- Owner: TransLink
- Platforms: Side platforms
- Tracks: 2
- Connections: 84 UBC

Construction
- Structure type: Elevated
- Accessible: yes
- Architect: Francl Architecture; Stantec Architecture

Other information
- Station code: VC
- Fare zone: 1

History
- Opened: January 6, 2006

Passengers
- 2025: 880,000 ▲0.3%
- Rank: 45 of 54

Services
Preceding station	TransLink	Following station
Terminus	Millennium Line	Commercial–Broadway towards Lafarge Lake–Douglas
Future services
Great Northern Way–Emily Carr towards Arbutus	Millennium Line Broadway extension (opens 2027)	Commercial–Broadway towards Lafarge Lake–Douglas
Location

VCC–Clark is an elevated station on the Millennium Line of Metro Vancouver's SkyTrain rapid transit system. The station is named after the nearby Vancouver Community College (VCC) located in Vancouver, British Columbia, Canada and serves as the western terminus of the Millennium Line.

== History ==
VCC–Clark station's original plans called for it to be located underground below Broadway to the south of Vancouver Community College, but the City of Vancouver wanted the line to run to the north through an emerging technology zone on the False Creek Flats.

The station was originally planned to open with the original portion of the Millennium Line in 2002, but the construction was delayed because of property issues as the station is located in a former railyard. Service at the station was slated to begin in the fourth quarter of 2005, but testing and commissioning of the station and related facilities continued during that time frame, with trial running of trains starting in mid-November that year. The station, designed by the architecture firms Francl Architecture and Stantec Architecture, officially opened in 2006. A limited-stop bus route, the 84, connects VCC–Clark to UBC to relieve the 99 B-Line bus route and the trolley buses on Broadway.

Plans originally called for the Millennium Line to extend west along the Broadway corridor from VCC–Clark station to Granville Street and 10th Avenue with three additional stations. In 2006, it was revealed that this 5-kilometre (3.1 mi) extension would be placed on hold while priority was given to the Canada Line and Evergreen Extension. In 2018, a 5.7-kilometre (3.5 mi) extension west to Arbutus Street was approved with an estimated completion date of 2027.

== Station information ==
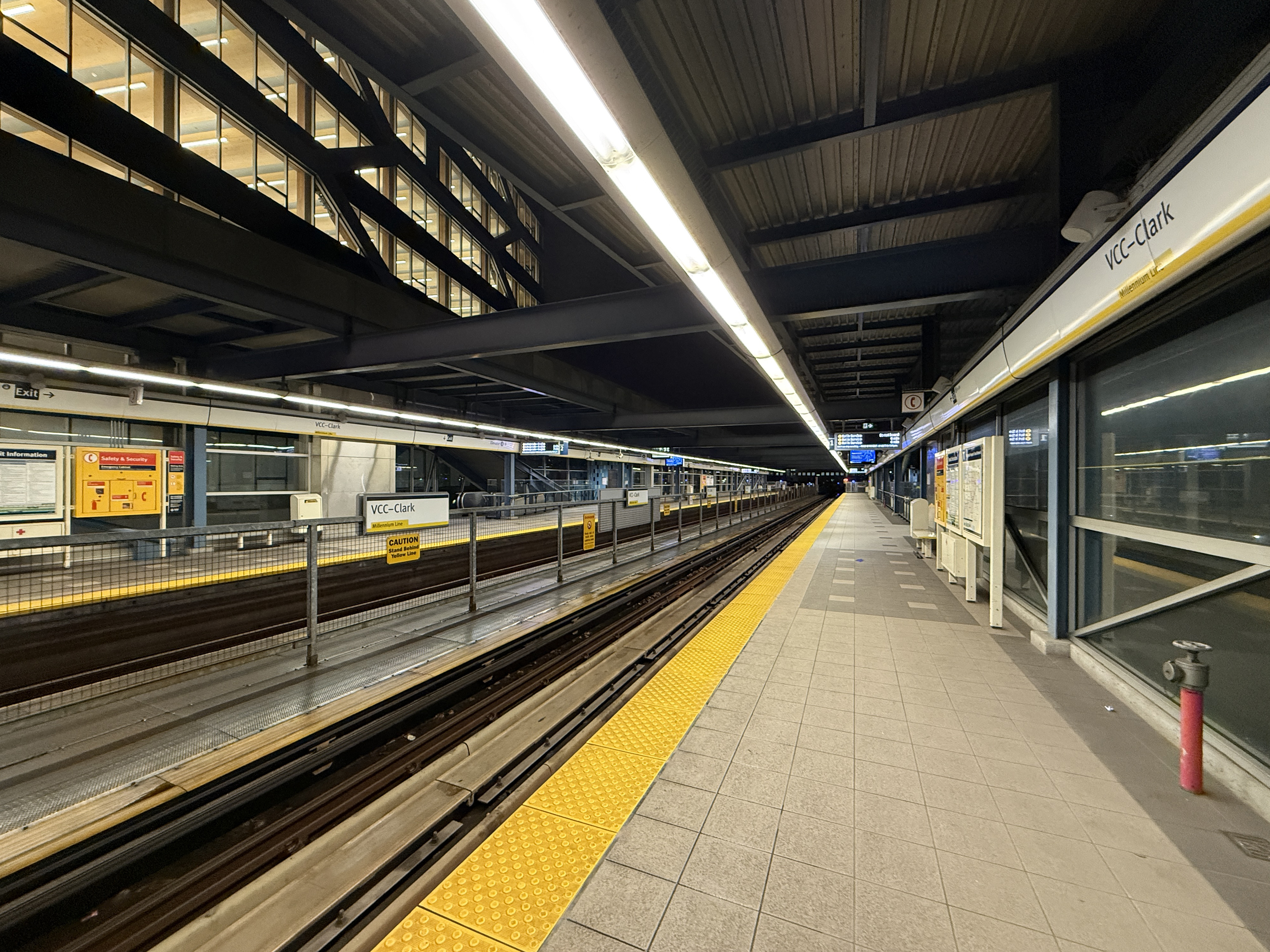
Platform level looking towards the tail tracks on the west end

=== Entrances ===
VCC–Clark station is served by a single entrance located at the west end of the station. The entrance is located on the Keith Drive north of 6th Avenue.

=== Transit connections ===
VCC–Clark station is served by one bus connection: an express route to the University of British Columbia.

Bay	Routes
1	84 UBC (Express)
