= 99 B-Line =

Express bus service in Metro Vancouver, Canada

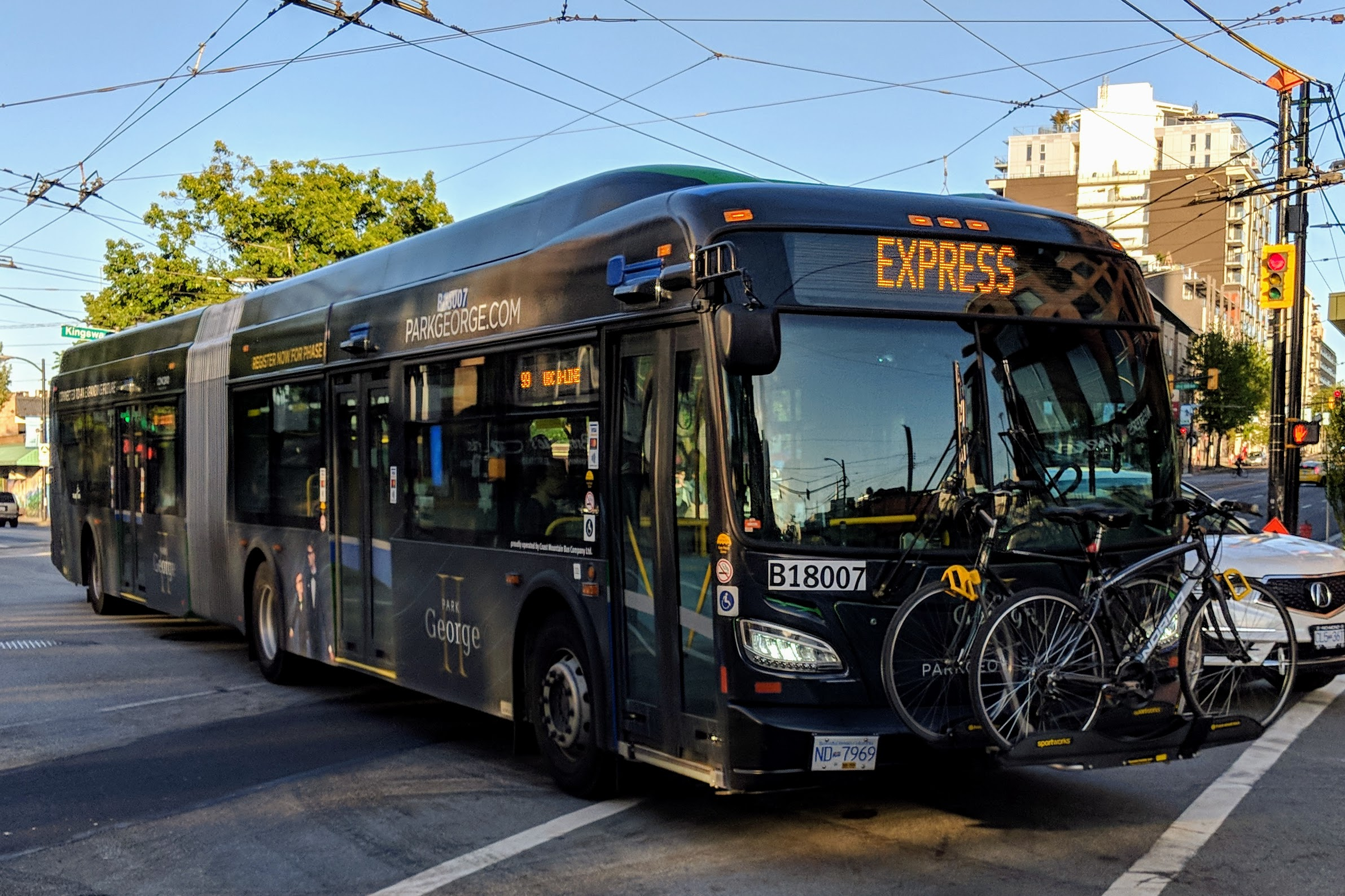
- A 99 B-Line bus

Overview
- System: TransLink
- Operator: Coast Mountain Bus Company
- Began service: September 3, 1996

Route
- Start: UBC Exchange
- End: Commercial–Broadway station
- Length: 14.3 km (8.9 mi)
- Stops: 13

Service
- Ridership: 34,650 (avg. weekday 2025)
Route map
99 B-Line highlighted in orange; limited service segment in red
Key

The 99 B-Line is an express bus line with bus rapid transit elements in Vancouver, British Columbia, Canada. It travels along Broadway, a major east–west thoroughfare, and connects the University of British Columbia (UBC) to Commercial–Broadway station on the SkyTrain system. It is operated by Coast Mountain Bus Company and funded by TransLink.

It is the first and the most popular of the B-Line routes in the regional system. The other B-Lines that followed are based on the 99 B-Line in terms of the use of articulated buses (which can carry 120 passengers) and frequent arrivals for buses. The waiting time for a bus during peak hours on a weekday is 1.5–3 minutes. All of the buses on this route are built by New Flyer Industries of Winnipeg, Manitoba. On average it takes 42 minutes to complete the entire route, or half an hour near the last runs at the end of the night.

The 99 B-Line was the busiest bus route in Canada and the United States in 2018, with an average weekday ridership of 55,900 passengers. This number had increased from approximately 45,000 passengers per day in 2007. The COVID-19 pandemic in British Columbia and subsequent demand and service changes lowered the ridership of the line; by 2024, it saw around 34,160 trips per weekday, about 60 percent of its peak levels of 57,240 in 2019. Ridership across the overall TransLink network returned to 90 percent of pre-pandemic levels during the same time period.

== History ==
The 99 B-Line was created to connect UBC to Lougheed Mall in Burnaby via 10th Avenue, Broadway and Lougheed Highway. Then under the jurisdiction of BC Transit, it was launched on September 3, 1996 and started out using a few high-floor articulated buses and regular-sized buses. It became apparent that the regular buses could not handle the demand as this route soon became the most popular route in the system. By September 1998, 60-foot low-floor articulated buses were used for all trips, adorned with a distinctive B-Line livery. During rush hours, the B-Line uses curb lanes designated as bus lanes on Broadway from Commercial–Broadway station to Arbutus Street.

An estimated 12,000 passengers per day used the route daily during its first two years of operation, 30% more than had been estimated. Of that number, 20% of the passengers used to drive to their destination rather than take public transit. Service had to be extended to late-nights, Sundays and holidays.

Service began with a 10-minute headway between UBC and Broadway station, 10–20 minute headway between UBC and Brentwood Mall, and 30 minute headway between UBC and Lougheed Mall. Frequency was increased as demand increased, but only in the UBC to Broadway station section, with 7.5 minute headway. Soon the Lougheed Mall section was improved to 15-minute headway. Today the 99 B-Line operates on a 2-minute headway in the morning peak direction, with a 4.5 minute day base headway.

In the late 1990s, the British Columbia government approved the construction of a new SkyTrain line called the Millennium Line. This new line replaced the eastern portion of the 99 B-Line, from Broadway station to its old terminus at Lougheed Mall. It opened in 2002, with the 99 B-Line terminating at then-Broadway station (now Commercial–Broadway station as a result of the 2009 combining of the Expo Line's Broadway station and the Millennium Line's Commercial station).

As the fair bulk of the route's riders are students at UBC, the introduction of the U-Pass in 2003, a discounted bus pass for university students, put even more strain on the route's resources. A peak-hour B-Line route called the #99 Special was introduced in 2004, featuring non-stop service to UBC during the morning rush hours and to Broadway station during evening rush hours. This route's "non-stop" moniker was revoked in 2005 when the service began serving more stops along the corridor and was discontinued completely in January 2006 to make way for a new route that was expected to be about as fast as the #99, the #84, which operates from UBC to the new VCC–Clark station. This new route was designed to take pressure off the 99 B-Line. Additionally, curb lanes on Broadway were converted into bus lanes for rush-hour periods.

On June 25, 2007, the 99 B-Line route became the first route in the TransLink system to allow passengers with valid proof of payment to board using any of the three doors at any stop. To facilitate this, the bus driver controls the operation of all three doors at each of the stops. Passengers who are paying cash must board through the front door. Fare Enforcement is carried out by Transit Security Officers. Transit Security Officers may board the bus at any time to conduct a Fare Inspection. Passengers without valid fare could be removed from the bus or fined.

With the rest of the B-Line routes having been rebranded as RapidBus in January 2020, it was decided to keep the 99 B-Line unchanged instead of including it in the rebranding as the Millennium Line Broadway extension will be replacing the eastern section of the 99 B-Line. The extension will include six stations running from VCC–Clark station to Arbutus Street, where the truncated service will continue from a new bus loop. These changes left the 99 B-Line as the only B-Line still in service.

The 99 B-Line was the busiest bus route in Translink's network in 2025, with over 10 million total boardings.

== Stops and transfer points ==
- UBC Exchange – The western terminus of the line, serving UBC's campus centre; transfer point for services to other Vancouver-area neighbourhoods, Richmond and Burnaby.
- Allison – The easternmost stop in the unincorporated University Endowment Lands before the route enters the city of Vancouver. Serves the University Marketplace shopping area as well as the residents around it.
- Sasamat – The westernmost stop in Vancouver before entering the University Endowment Lands. Serves the West Point Grey neighbourhood.
- Alma/W 10th – Connects to trolley bus routes serving the Dunbar corridor.
- Macdonald – Transfer point for the #2 bus, which travels into downtown Vancouver.
- Arbutus – This stop was added on December 14, 2009. Serves the Kitsilano neighbourhood and provides connections to the #16 Arbutus bus.
- Granville – Connects to the #10 bus, which runs along Granville Street and into downtown. Other connections are the #14 UBC/Hastings, #16 Arbutus/29th Avenue station, and the N9/N10 Night Bus routes.
- Heather/Willow – Serves Vancouver General Hospital and the southern False Creek area. Also a transfer point for route #17 Oak.
- Cambie – Transfer point for the Canada Line (Broadway–City Hall station) to downtown, Richmond and Vancouver International Airport. Provides service to Vancouver City Hall and connects to the #15 bus that runs along Cambie Street.
- Main – Transfer point for the #3 bus that operates along Main Street. Transfer point for the #19 bus that operates between Stanley Park and Metrotown station.
- Fraser – This stop was added on December 14, 2009; provides connections to the #8 Fraser bus.
- Clark – Serves Vancouver Community College. Also a short walk from the VCC–Clark SkyTrain station. Transfer point for the #22 bus operating down Knight Street. The stop at Clark was added on April 14, 1997.
- Commercial–Broadway station – Eastern terminus of the 99 B-Line. Serves the Commercial–Broadway SkyTrain station. Also a transfer point for the #20 bus operating along Commercial Drive and Victoria Drive.

=== Beyond Commercial–Broadway station ===
Before SkyTrain's Millennium Line was opened, the 99 B-Line served these stops in addition to the ones above.

- Boundary Road – Served the area at the Burnaby–Vancouver border. Was also a transfer point for the #9 bus. It was just prior to this stop that the route leaves Broadway, which turns into Lougheed Highway. Some runs of the current 99 B-Line service Boundary when going to and from the Burnaby bus depot.
- Brentwood Mall – Served the Brentwood Town Centre shopping mall and was the first stop in Burnaby (excluding Boundary, because it straddled city limits). Brentwood still is a popular transfer point for North Burnaby bus routes to this day. Replaced by Brentwood Town Centre station on the SkyTrain.
- Austin – Stopped at Government during peak hours. It was one of the first stops servicing Lougheed Mall and was also close to bus connections to Simon Fraser University.
- Lougheed Mall – Served the Lougheed Town Centre shopping mall and was the eastern terminus of the 99 B-Line. It is still home to many routes going to Coquitlam, Port Coquitlam, Port Moody, Pitt Meadows and Maple Ridge. The stop was replaced by Lougheed Town Centre station on the SkyTrain.

== See also ==
- 97 B-Line
- 98 B-Line
- R1 King George Blvd (formerly 96 B-Line)
- R5 Hastings St (formerly 95 B-Line)
- List of bus routes in Metro Vancouver
