= Commercial–Broadway station =

Metro Vancouver SkyTrain station

Commercial–Broadway
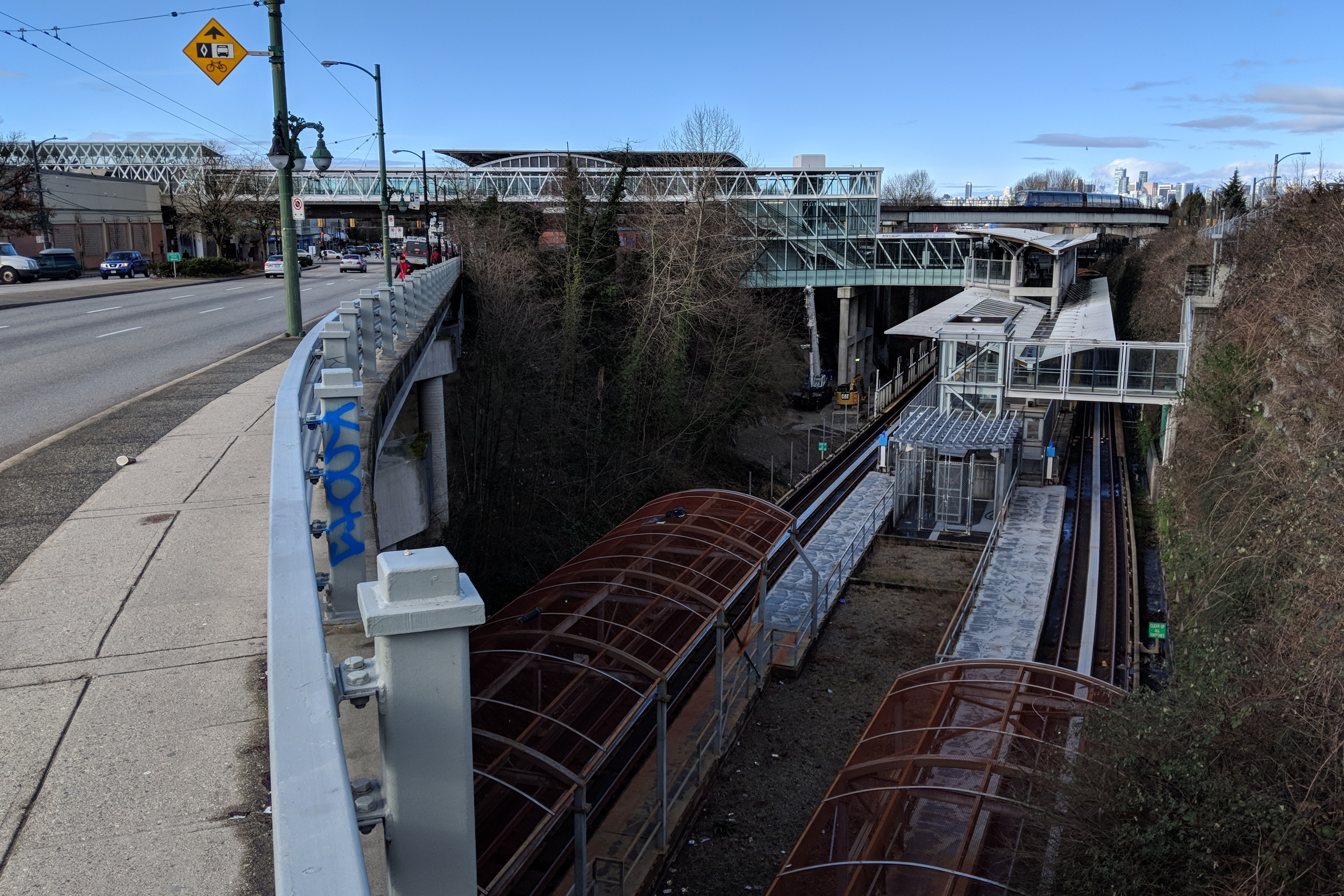
- Commercial-Broadway station viewed from the east

General information
- Location: 2550 Commercial Drive, Vancouver
- Coordinates: 49°15′45″N 123°04′08″W
- System: SkyTrain station
- Owner: BC Transit, BC Ministry of Transportation, TransLink
- Platforms: 2 centre platforms 1 side platform
- Tracks: 4 (2 on each level)
- Connections: 99 B-Line

Construction
- Structure type: Below-grade and elevated
- Platform levels: 2
- Accessible: yes

Other information
- Station code: BW, CM
- Fare zone: 1

History
- Opened: December 11, 1985; 40 years ago (Expo Line); August 31, 2002; 24 years ago (Millennium Line)
- Rebuilt: 2002, 2008–2009, 2015–2019; 7 years ago
- Former names: Broadway (1985–2009); Commercial Drive (2002–2009)

Passengers
- 2025: 6,445,000 ▼4.6%
- Rank: 3 of 54

Services
Preceding station	TransLink	Following station
Main Street–Science World towards Waterfront	Expo Line	Nanaimo towards King George or Production Way–University
VCC–Clark Terminus	Millennium Line	Renfrew towards Lafarge Lake–Douglas
Location

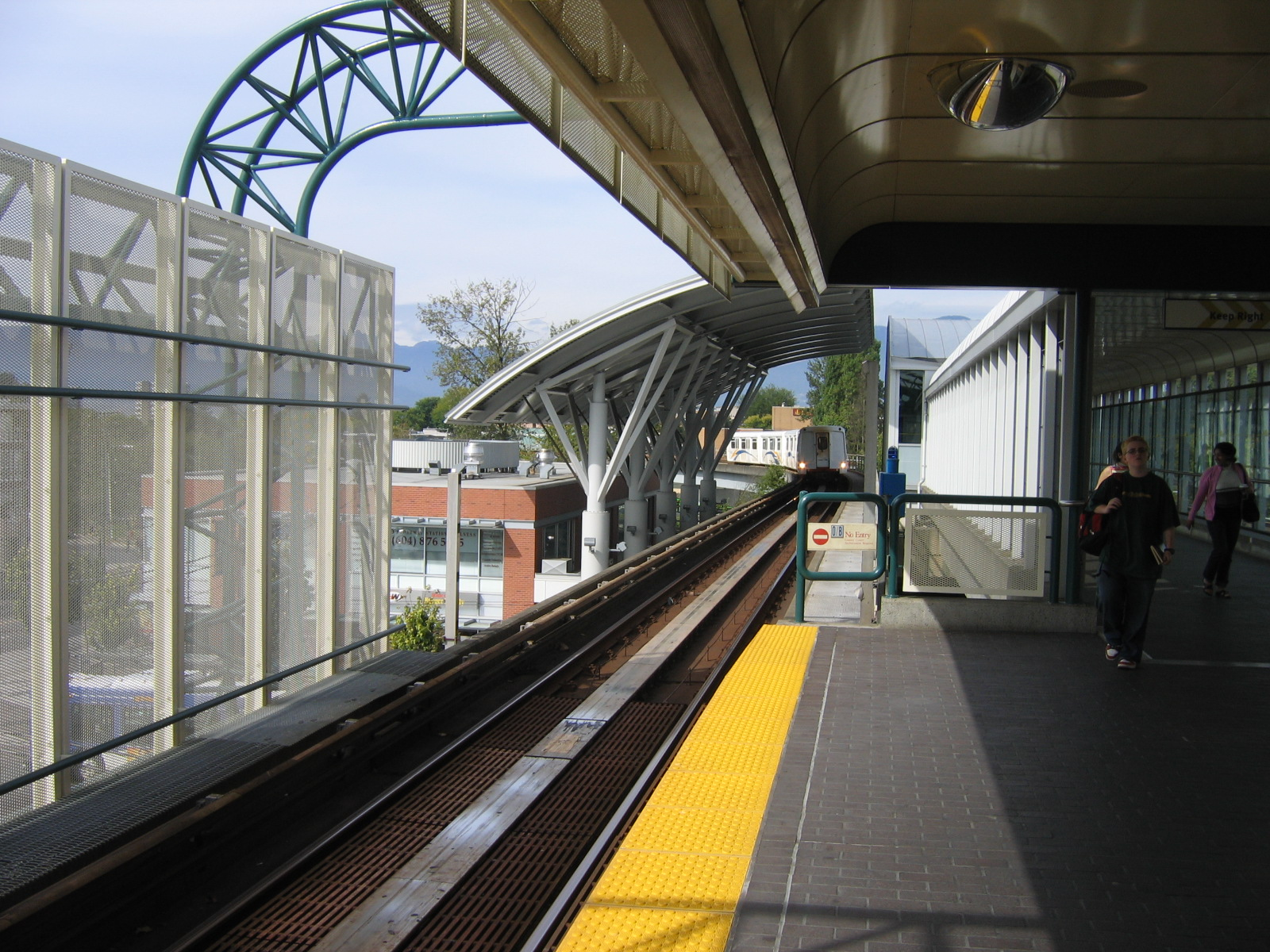
Platform 4 trains travel outbound on the Expo Line.

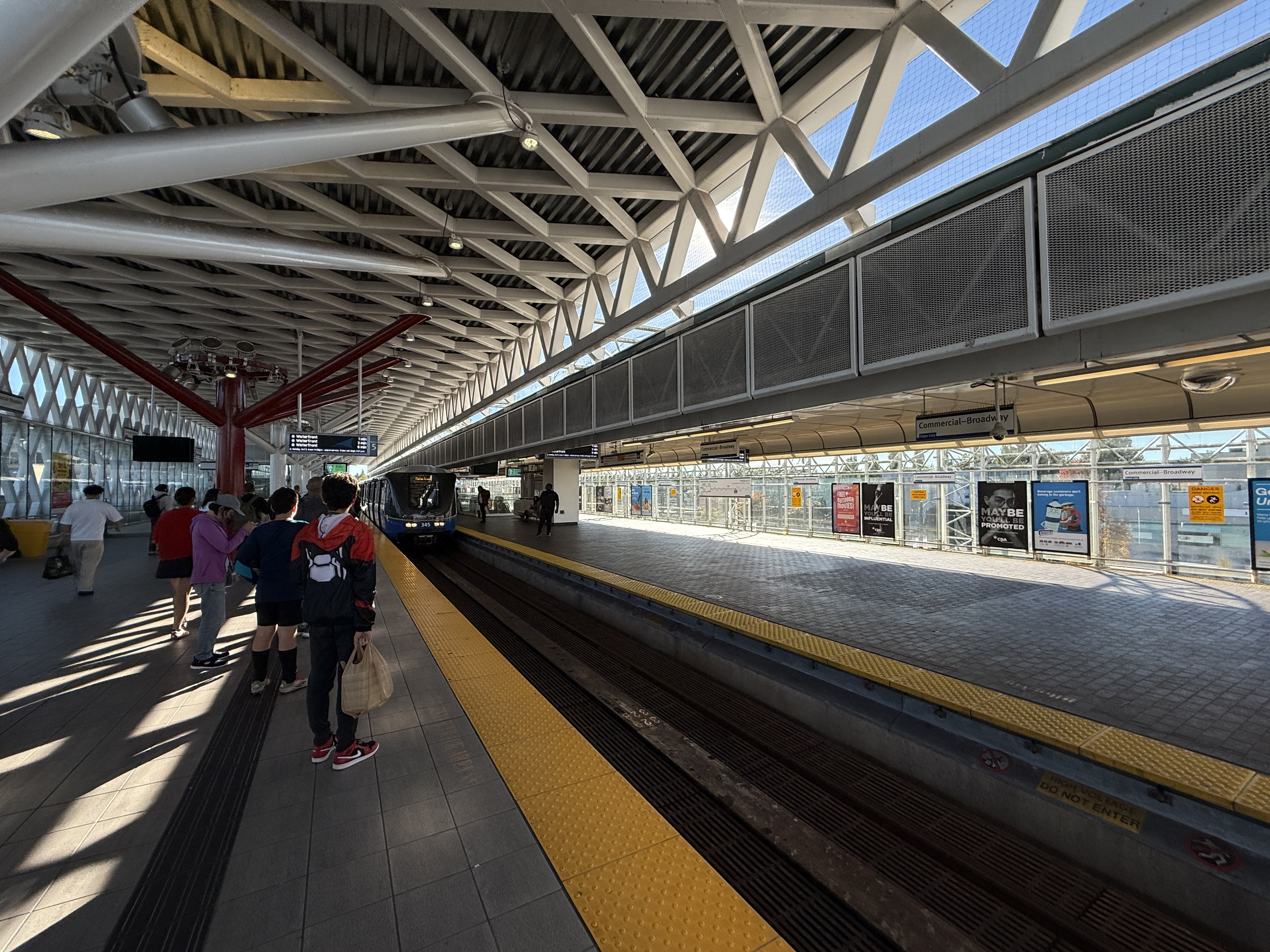
Platform 5 travel inbound on the Expo Line.

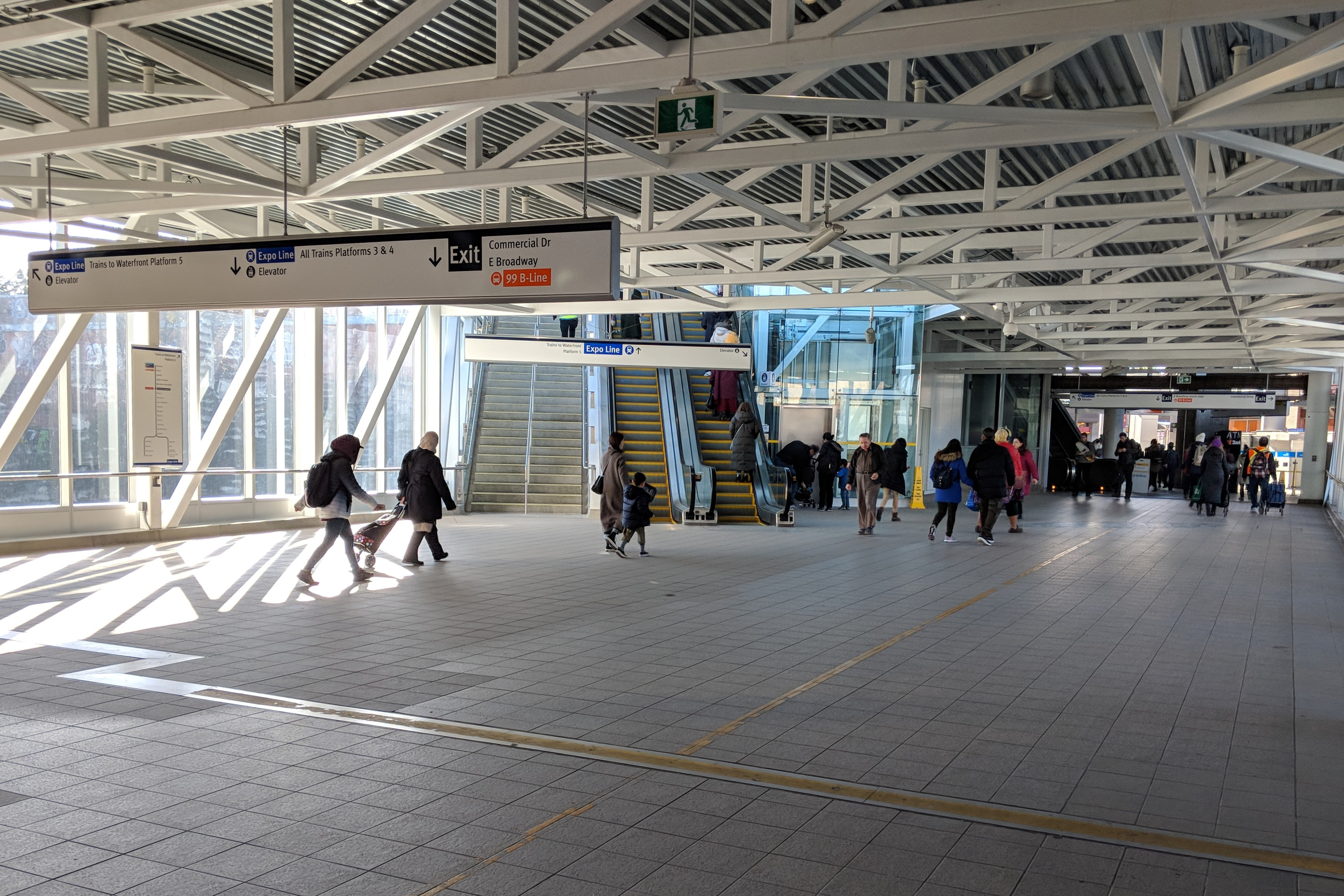
Concourse located on the north side of East Broadway

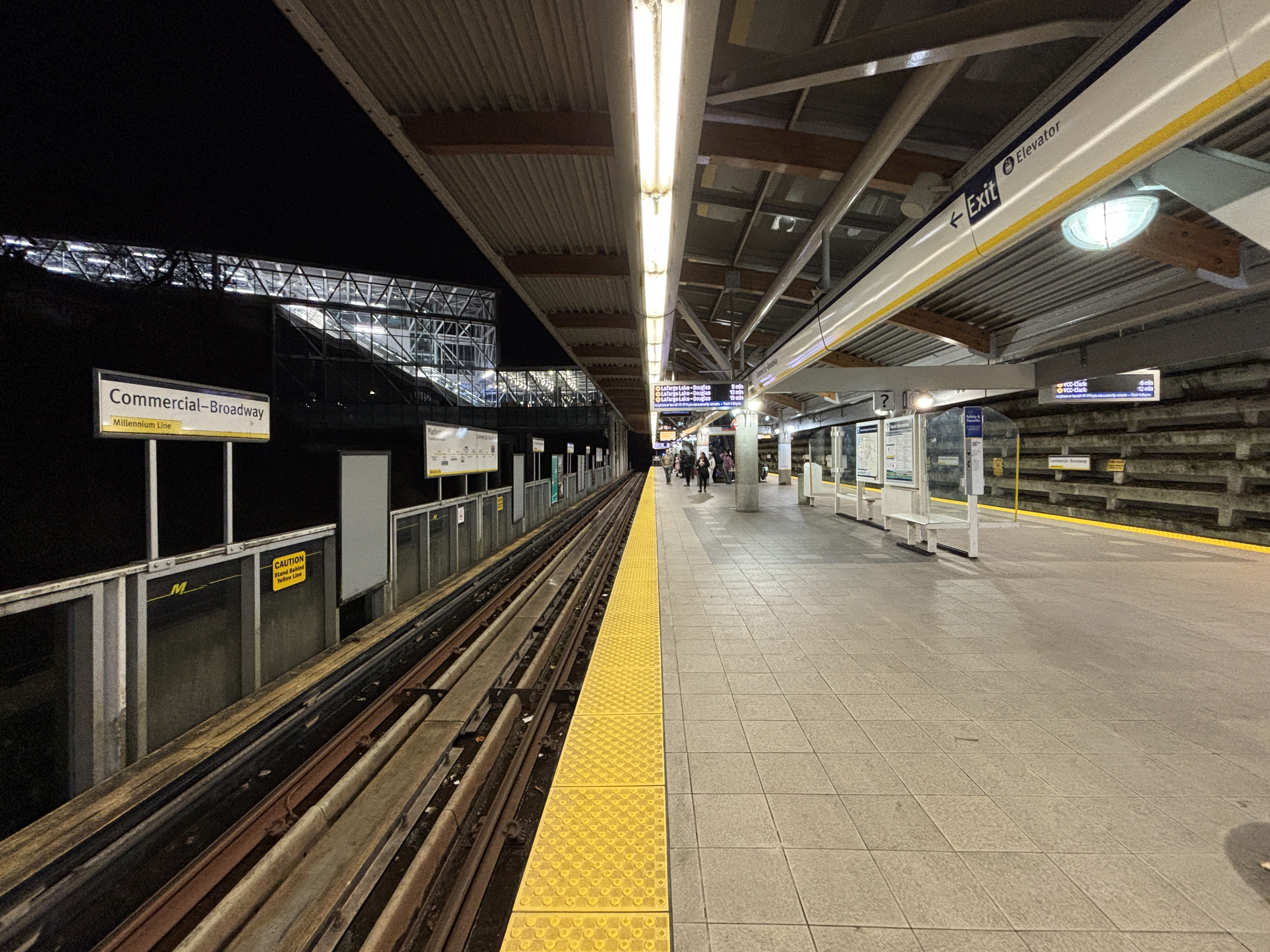
Platforms 1 and 2 are located in the Grandview Cut and provide Millennium Line service.

Commercial–Broadway (formerly two separate stations, Broadway and Commercial Drive) is a rapid transit station complex in Metro Vancouver's SkyTrain system in Vancouver, British Columbia, Canada. It serves an elevated portion of the Expo Line and a below-grade portion of the Millennium Line. It is a major transit hub, with the third-highest number of boardings of any SkyTrain station, and a terminus of the region's busiest bus route, the 99 B-Line.

The station was formed by merging the previously separate Broadway and Commercial Drive stations in 2009. In February 2019, a third platform was opened in the Broadway segment of the station to increase capacity for Waterfront station–bound Expo Line service in anticipation of increased station traffic resulting from various initiatives, including the opening of the Evergreen extension on the Millennium Line.

== Location ==
Commercial–Broadway station is located just east of the intersection of East Broadway and Commercial Drive in East Vancouver, on the outskirts of Vancouver's Little Italy district. The Expo Line platform is elevated over East Broadway, while the Millennium Line platform is located below street level within the Grandview Cut south of Grandview Highway North. The two sections are connected via a pedestrian overpass that crosses East Broadway.

== History ==
Commercial–Broadway station is a merger of two existing stations: Broadway station on the Expo Line and Commercial Drive station on the Millennium Line.

Broadway station opened on December 11, 1985, as part of the original Expo Line. It was designed by architecture firm Allen Parker and Associates, who were also responsible for Burrard station. The station later became one of the system's busiest. A nearby station, named Commercial Drive, opened in the Grandview Cut on August 31, 2002, as the temporary terminus for the Millennium Line with a transfer to Broadway station. In January 2006, the Millennium Line was extended westward by 0.75 kilometres (0.47 mi) to terminate at VCC–Clark station.

In November 2008, renovations began on Broadway station, including the addition of a new entrance on the south side of the station from 10th Avenue, the replacement and relocation of the station's elevator, and the refitting of the original metal mesh paneling on the ground level with glass. These upgrades were completed in October 2009.

Both stations were formally merged and renamed on September 7, 2009, due to concern over potential confusion with Broadway–City Hall station of the then-new Canada Line. Commercial Drive became platforms 1 and 2 of the new station, while Broadway became platforms 3 and 4.

Between August 31, 2002, and October 22, 2016, the station was one of only four in the world where the same metro line (in this case, the Millennium Line) ran through a station twice in a pretzel configuration, the others being the Serdika and Serdika II stations on the Sofia Metro in Sofia, Bulgaria; the Monument Metro station on the Tyne and Wear Metro in Newcastle upon Tyne, England; and Voorweg RandstadRail station on the Randstadrail in The Hague, Netherlands.

== Upgrades ==
In conjunction with the Evergreen Extension project, major upgrades at the station began in the second quarter of 2015 to accommodate increased passenger volumes and enhance the passenger environment. Originally scheduled to be completed by mid-2017, these upgrades were completed and opened to the public on February 2, 2019. The upgrades include:

- A new platform (platform 5) to the east of platforms 3 and 4, which improves passenger traffic on those platforms by providing extra platform capacity for Waterfront station–bound Expo trains in anticipation of increased traffic at the station owing to initiatives such as the opening of the Evergreen stations on the Millennium Line. Waterfront-bound trains at this station open their doors on both sides, allowing all-door boarding and alighting.
- Added weather protection and amenities for bus passenger waiting areas.
- Access improvements within the station, including upgraded passageways, vertical movement, and entrances.
- A new pedestrian plaza for the portion of the station south of Broadway.
- A new bike parkade which accommodates up to 42 bicycles.

== Services ==
- Commercial–Broadway station is a major connection point for TransLink bus routes that run along Broadway, including the 9 bus and the 99 B-Line, an articulated express bus with limited stops and direct access to the University of British Columbia.
- Prior to the upgrading of Broadway station between 2008 and 2009, the station contained the "Broadway Smoke Shoppe", "The Exchange", and the "Vancouver Ticket Centre", three small convenience and retail outlets introduced as part of a retail program established with the opening of SkyTrain in 1986.

== Station information ==
=== Entrances ===
- Commercial Drive and Broadway (north) entrance: located at the northeast corner of Broadway and Commercial Drive intersection, opened in 2002 in conjunction with the opening of Millennium Line. Passenger can enter the station from both the westbound (north) side of Broadway and southbound side of Commercial Drive. This entrance provides both up/down escalators and elevators to all 4 platforms, although both escalators serving platforms 1 and 2 may turn to the peak direction of travel during rush hours.
- Broadway (south) entrance: the original entrance for the station, located at the southeast corner of the intersection, north end of platforms 3 and 4. The entrance opens toward the eastbound (south) side of Broadway. Escalators and elevators connect the street level with platforms 3 and 4. To access platforms 1 and 2, passenger must cross Broadway or use the overhead walkway to the Commercial Drive entrance.
- 10th Avenue entrance: the newest entrance for the station, opened in 2009. The entrance is located at the south end of platforms 3 and 4, sharing the station house with Broadway entrance.

=== Transit connections ===
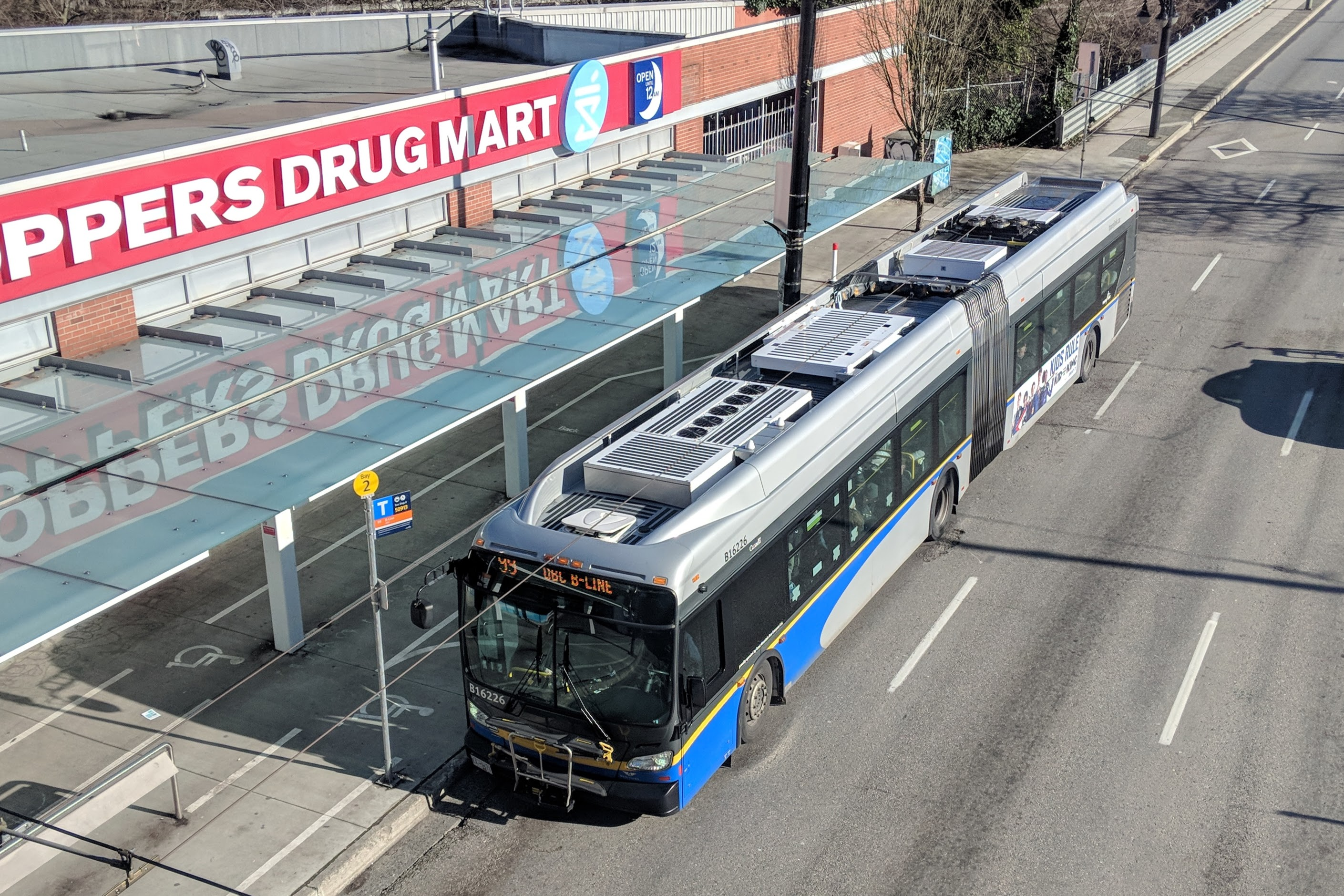
99 B-Line with service to UBC

Bus routes:

- The following routes travel westbound on Broadway, with stop in front of the Broadway (north) entrance of the station:
  - 9 UBC / Alma / To Granville
  - 99 B-Line UBC
  - N9 Downtown NightBus
- Transit service travelling eastbound on Broadway is located near the Broadway (south) entrance:
  - 9 Boundary
  - 99 B-Line To Boundary B-Line
  - N9 Coquitlam Station NightBus
- The following routes travel southbound on Commercial Drive, with stops on both north and south side of Broadway intersection:
  - 20 Victoria / Victoria to 54th
  - N20 Victoria NightBus
- Northbound transit service on Commercial Drive stops north of the Broadway intersection only, near the Commercial Drive entrance:
  - 20 Downtown
  - N20 Downtown NightBus
  - Drop off for 9 and 99 Commercial Broadway Station
