= Millennium Line =

Rapid transit line in Metro Vancouver, Canada

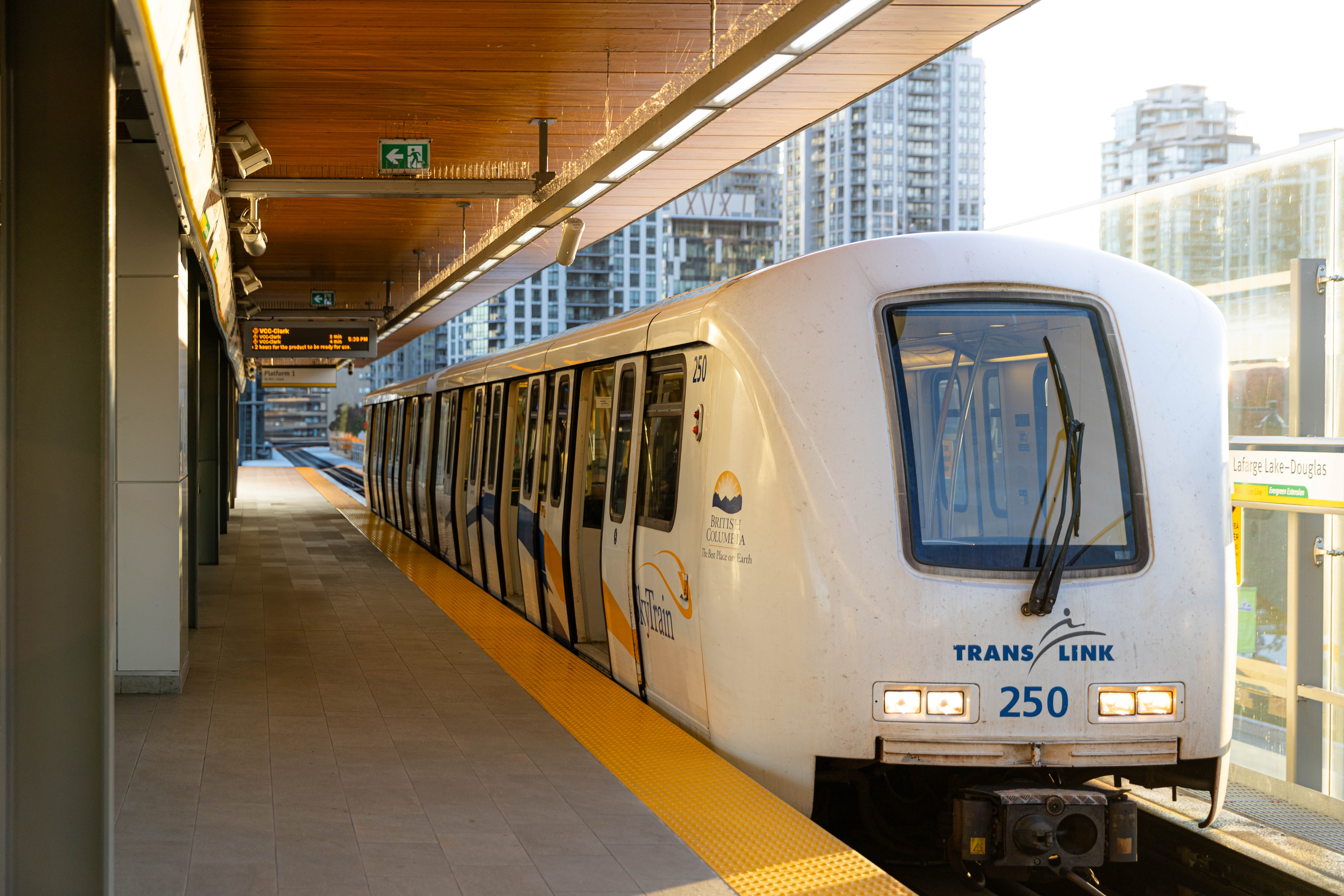
- A train at Lafarge Lake–Douglas station

Overview
- Owner: TransLink (South Coast British Columbia Transportation Authority)
- Locale: Metro Vancouver, British Columbia
- Termini: VCC–Clark; Lafarge Lake–Douglas
- Stations: 17 (6 under construction)

Service
- Type: Rapid transit
- System: SkyTrain
- Operator: British Columbia Rapid Transit Company
- Rolling stock: ART Mark II, 2 cars per trainset
- Daily ridership: 311,000 (2023) (Note: Combined with Expo Line)

History
- Opened: January 7, 2002; 24 years ago
- Last extension: 2016

Technical
- Line length: 25.5 km (15.8 mi)
- Number of tracks: 2
- Track gauge: 1,435 mm (4 ft 8 1/2 in)
- Electrification: Third rail (linear motor)
- Operating speed: 80 km/h (50 mph)
Route map
Millennium Line highlighted in yellow

The Millennium Line is the second line of the SkyTrain rapid transit system in the Metro Vancouver region of British Columbia, Canada. The line is owned and operated by BC Rapid Transit Company, a subsidiary of TransLink, and links the cities of Vancouver, Burnaby, Coquitlam and Port Moody. The line was opened in 2002 and was named in recognition of the new millennium.

== Route ==
The Millennium Line operates from VCC–Clark station in Vancouver to Lafarge Lake–Douglas station in Coquitlam. The line is elevated to Burquitlam station, where it then goes through a 2-kilometre (1.2 mi) bored tunnel to the city of Port Moody. In Port Moody, the line runs at grade level, rising to cross railway tracks. From Coquitlam Central station, the line is elevated to the terminus at Lafarge Lake–Douglas station.

When the Evergreen Extension opened in late 2016, eastbound trains crossed the westbound tracks to access the new northernmost platform (Platform 3) at Lougheed Town Centre station. Trains then operated left-track running to a crossover junction just before Burquitlam Station, where trains crossed back to right-track running. Westbound Millennium Line trains crossed over to left-hand running just south of Burquitlam station, which allowed them to access westbound Platform 2 at Lougheed Town Centre station. This unusual service design allowed same-platform interchange for Expo Line passengers arriving at Lougheed Town Centre and continuing west towards VCC–Clark station on the Millennium Line.

On June 25, 2018, service patterns were changed to eliminate all left-track running. This change meant passengers arriving westbound at Lougheed on the Expo Line who wished to continue towards VCC–Clark could either change platforms at Lougheed or remain on their Expo Line train until its terminus at the next station, Production Way–University, where they could make a same-platform transfer to a westbound Millennium Line train. For passengers arriving eastbound at Lougheed, transfers between eastbound Millennium and Expo Line trains were now same-platform. TransLink stated the change to traditional right-track running would provide faster and more reliable trips for passengers as the many track changes the initial service pattern required had resulted in delays.

== History ==
=== Early proposals ===
When the Expo Line was opened in 1985, an extension to Lougheed Mall in east Burnaby was proposed. The most likely junction point for the spur to Lougheed Mall would have been from Royal Oak station, up Edmonds Street to Lougheed Mall, although early SkyTrain route maps also suggested an extension northeast from New Westminster. Neither plan was realized, although the extension of Expo Line tracks to Columbia Station in 1989 and the completion of the SkyBridge to Surrey in 1990 resulted in a short spur east of Columbia station, which was later incorporated into the new Millennium Line.

=== Phase I: Columbia to Commercial Drive (2002) ===
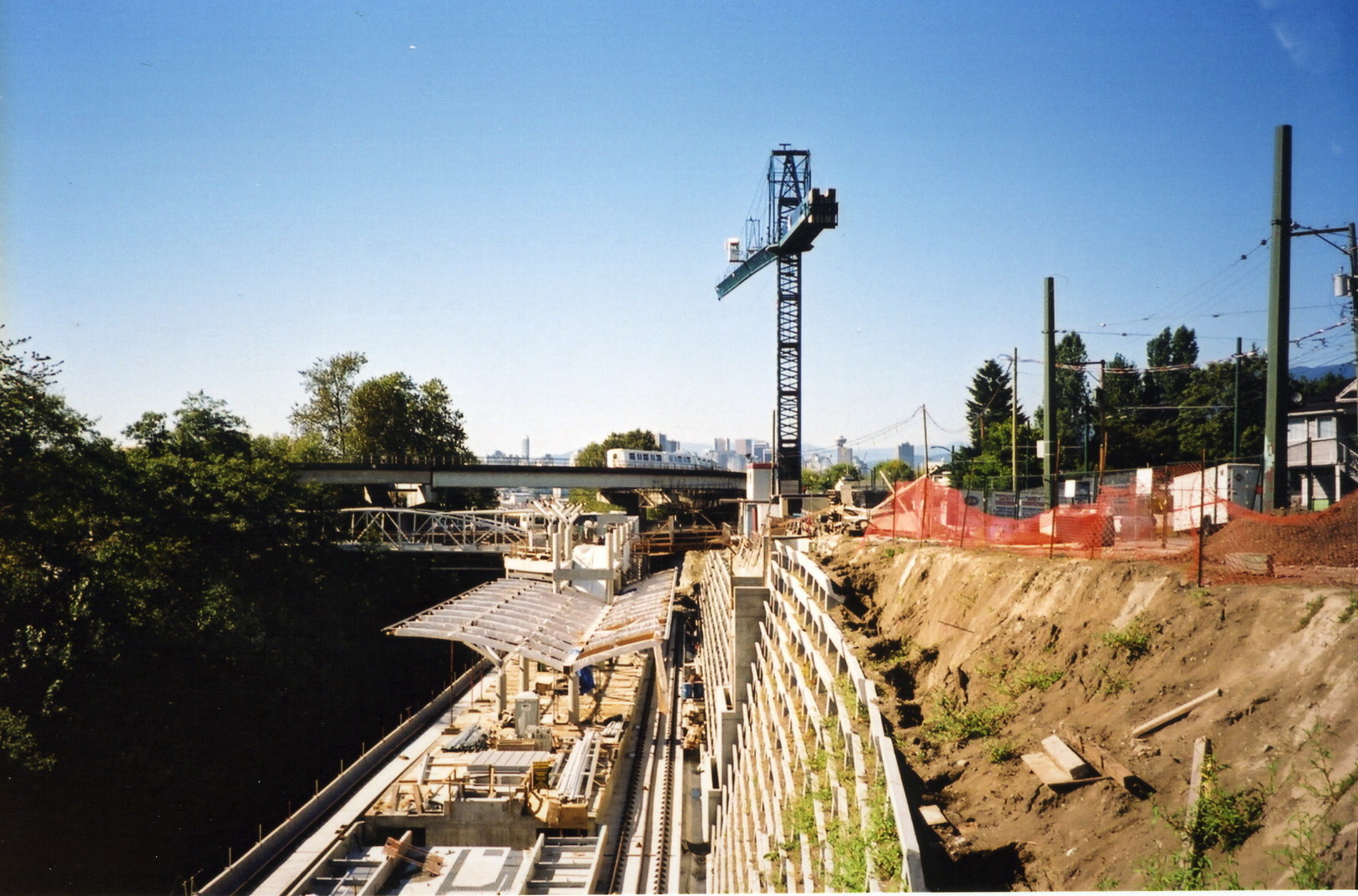
Commercial Drive station under construction in September 2001

In 1995, the British Columbia government announced that an entirely new line, a street-level light rail line, would be built along Broadway and Lougheed Highway to Lougheed Mall (served by Lougheed Town Centre station), as the first phase of the "T"-Line (one of three Intermediate Capacity Transit System lines) outlined in the Metro Vancouver's Livable Region Strategic Plan that extended into Coquitlam. An 18-month review of rapid transit was scheduled and started in January 1998 but was cut short by the government's announcement of its choice of an elevated SkyTrain line in June 1998. This meant that the first phase of the line would have to connect to the existing Expo Line to use its maintenance yard. Connecting the two lines at Broadway station was deemed impracticable, so the lines were connected in New Westminster. Switches to the Millennium Line were installed on the Expo Line just east of Columbia station. Expo Line service was reduced to a single track over the SkyBridge during the installation of these switches. The main contractor for the project was SAR Transit, a joint venture of SC Infrastructure, Agra Monenco, and Rizzani de Eccher Inc.

The Millennium Line opened for revenue service on January 7, 2002 (a preview for SkyTrain passengers took place on the prior two days), with trains operating between Waterfront station on the Expo Line and Braid station in eastern New Westminster.

For the second phase, service was extended to Commercial Drive station (since merged with Broadway station to form Commercial–Broadway) on August 31, 2002 (with full integration with the bus network occurring on September 3, 2002).

=== Lake City Way and extension to VCC–Clark (2003–2006) ===
Map of the Millennium Line configuration (in yellow) used until 2016

Lake City Way station, located between Sperling–Burnaby Lake and Production Way–University stations, opened on November 21, 2003. Three years later, the line was extended to its present terminus, VCC–Clark station, on January 6, 2006. The Millennium Line was now completed at a cost of $1.2 billion, $40 million under budget.

In 2007, the non-interlined portion of the Millennium Line served an average of 70,000 passengers per day. Of these, 14,000 passengers arrived on trains travelling from Expo Line stations west of Columbia station, and 7,000 transferred from the Surrey section of the Expo Line. In 2009, it was estimated that ridership had grown to at least 80,000 passengers per day.

Initially, the Millennium Line service followed the Expo Line from Waterfront to Columbia stations, then looped back into Vancouver via the new route, passing through Commercial–Broadway again at a different platform, and terminating at VCC–Clark station. After a reconfiguration on October 22, 2016, in preparation for the opening of the Evergreen Extension, the Millennium Line ran between VCC–Clark station in the west to Lougheed Town Centre station in the east. Transfers to the Expo Line were now made possible at Production Way–University and Lougheed Town Centre stations. Braid and Sapperton stations were reassigned to the Expo Line.

=== Phase II: Evergreen Extension (2016) ===
The second phase of the Millennium Line was to be an extension from Lougheed Mall to Coquitlam (then known as the Port Moody–Coquitlam (PMC) Line), which would have provided a "one-seat ride" from Coquitlam to VCC–Clark station. A short spur and switches to the PMC Line were installed to the east of Lougheed Town Centre station and a third platform was roughed-in in anticipation of the extension. Phase II was placed on hold following a change in provincial government.

A SkyTrain extension from Lougheed Town Centre station to Coquitlam Town Centre was proposed when the original Millennium Line was built and the necessary junction tracks for such an extension were built at the station during its initial construction. At one point prior to 2008, the mode planned for the extension was changed to light rail instead of SkyTrain, which meant that the junction tracks would have remained unused. However, in February 2008, plans reverted to the use of SkyTrain technology for the extension, to facilitate higher ridership, shorten travel times and to integrate seamlessly with the existing SkyTrain network. As a result, the junction tracks and roughed-in third platform at Lougheed Town Centre station were used as part of the Evergreen Extension.

Construction of the Evergreen Extension began in 2013 and was completed in late 2016. The extension opened for revenue service on December 2, 2016.

== Expansion plans ==
=== Broadway extension ===
A map showing the extension along Broadway in relation to existing lines and surface streets

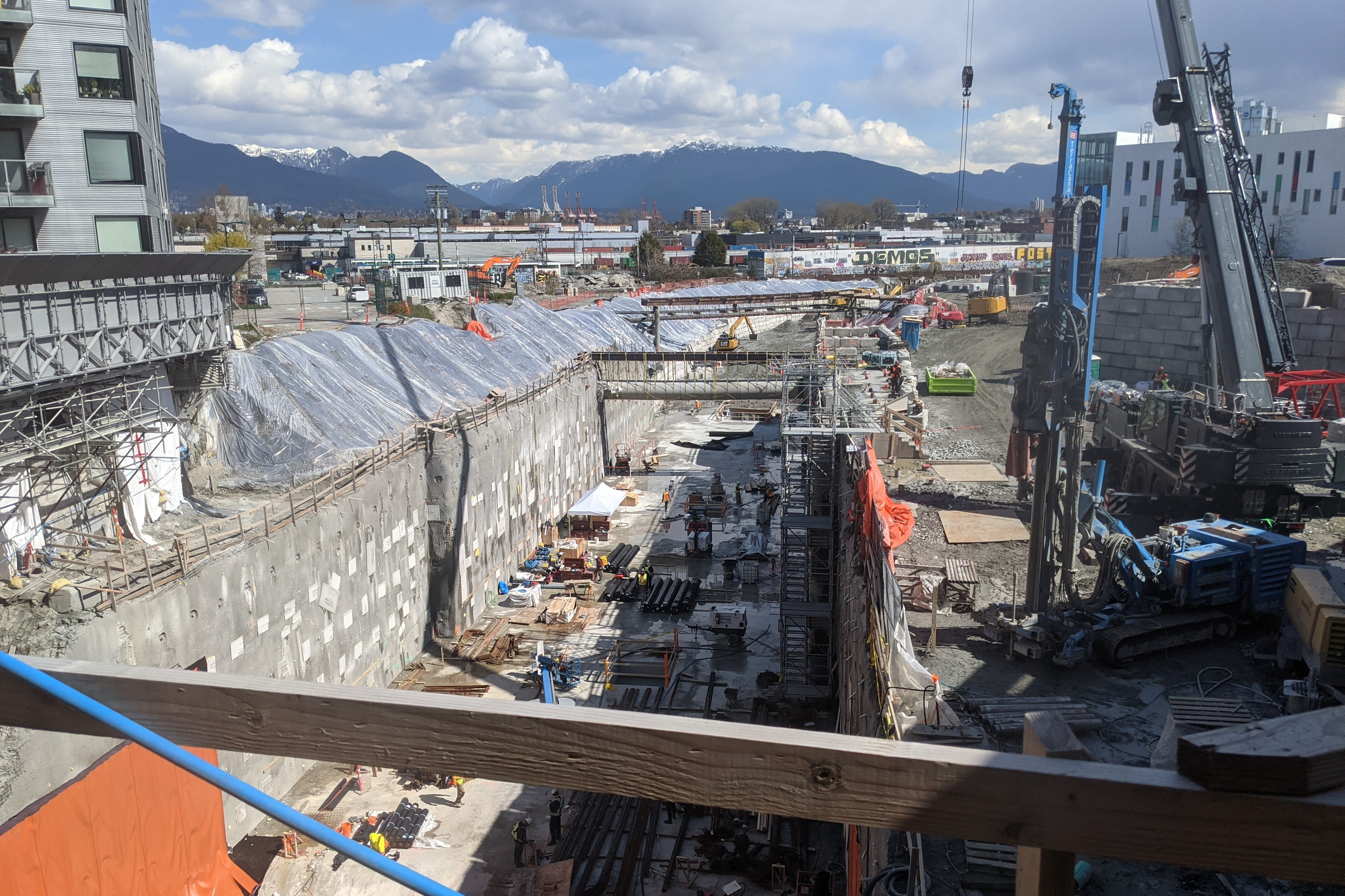
Staging pit for the tunnel boring machine at the site of Great Northern Way–Emily Carr station in April 2022

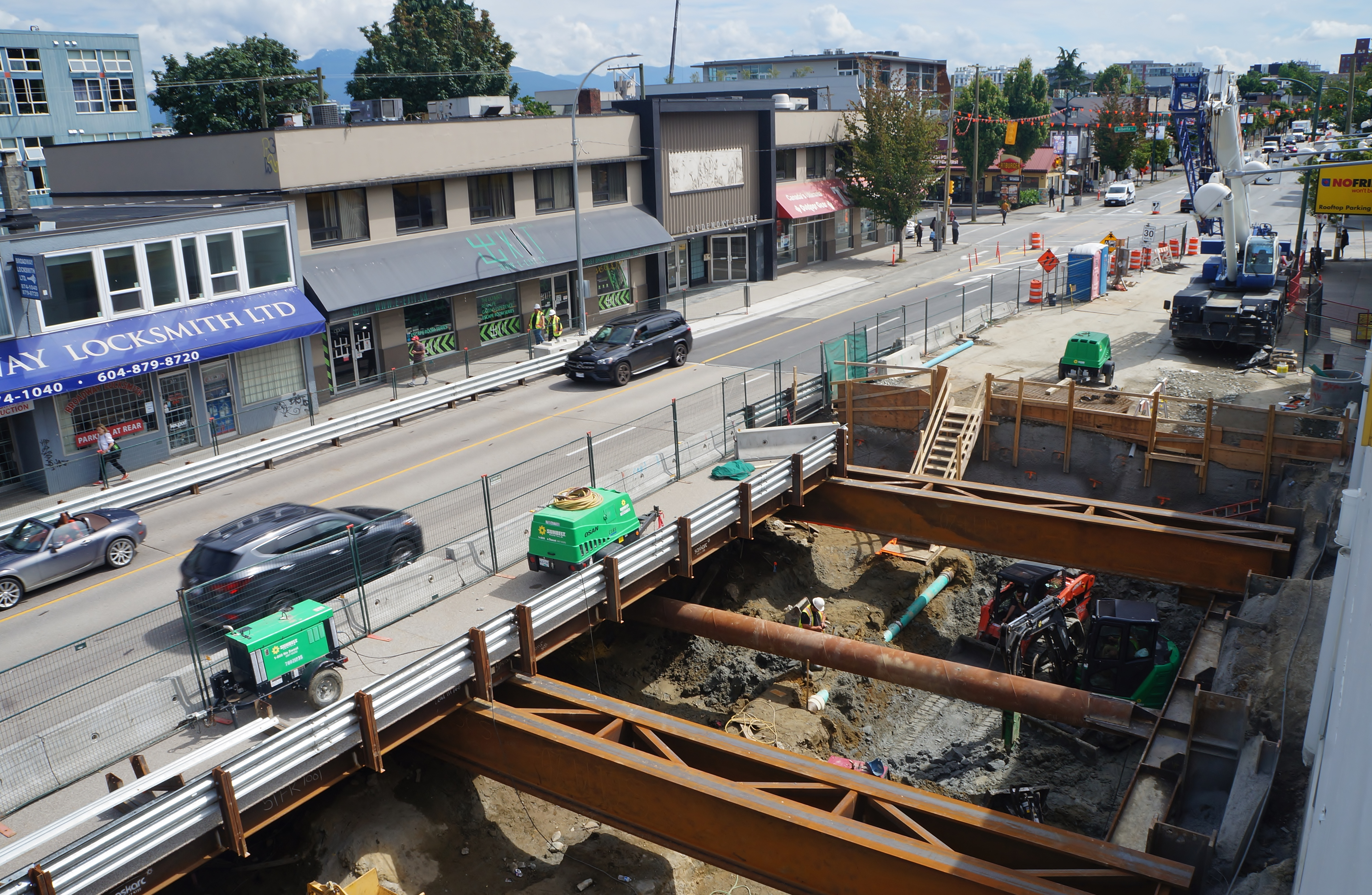
"Traffic decks" were built atop station construction sites to avoid road closures.

On March 16, 2018, the provincial government approved the construction of the "Broadway Subway Project", an initiative which will extend the Millennium Line west to Arbutus Street and add six new stations. The extension will be 5.7 kilometres (3.5 mi) long, all but 700 metres (2,300 ft) of which will be underground, and cost an estimated $2.83 billion. Originally scheduled for a 2025 opening, the expected opening was pushed back to early 2026 in November 2022. The delay was caused by a labour dispute involving concrete workers which started in June 2022. On May 24, 2024, the province revealed that the project would be delayed further, to the fourth quarter of 2027.

While six new stations are confirmed for the Broadway extension, one will become part of the existing Broadway–City Hall Canada Line station, which is scheduled to be upgraded as part of the project: (Note: All locations are approximate, with final station locations within one block of the given intersections.)

- Great Northern Way–Emily Carr station, at Great Northern Way and Thornton Street adjacent to the Emily Carr University
- Mount Pleasant station, at Main Street and East Broadway
- Broadway–City Hall station, at Cambie Street and West Broadway. The existing Broadway–City Hall station on the Canada Line, originally designed with a "knock-out" panel to accommodate a connection to a future Millennium Line extension, will be upgraded and connected to the extension. An adjacent development was required by the City of Vancouver to provide space for an additional entrance to the Millennium Line portion of the station.
- Oak–VGH station, at Laurel Street and West Broadway near Vancouver General Hospital (VGH)
- South Granville station, at Granville Street and West Broadway
- Arbutus station, at Arbutus Street and West Broadway. The 99 B-Line bus route, which follows much of the extension's route, will be truncated to terminate at this station.

==== Construction ====
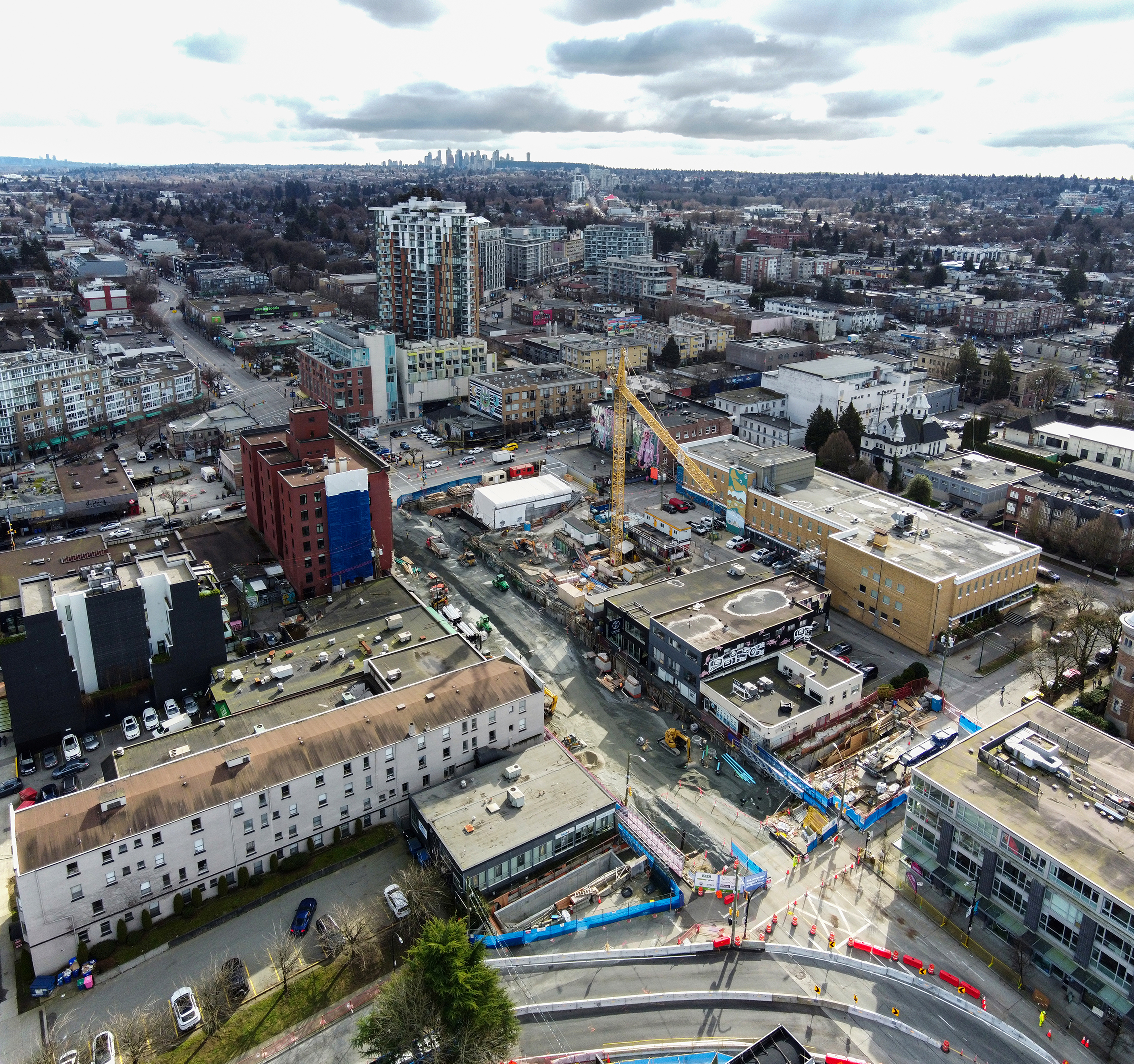
Beginning in late January 2026, construction of Mount Pleasant station required the closure of Broadway between Main and Quebec Streets for approximately 4 months starting (February 2026)

Preliminary work on the extension began on February 19, 2019, with the installation of trolley poles and wires on 12th Avenue between Arbutus and Granville Streets that were required in order to reroute trolley buses off of Broadway for the duration of the construction of the subway. On June 22, 2020, trolleybuses were removed from Broadway. The provincial government initially had a plan to have a contractor selected by April 2020 to allow for construction to begin later that year. On July 17, 2020, the provincial Ministry of Transportation announced that Acciona Infrastructure, a Spanish conglomerate, and Ghella, an Italian company, would be in charge of construction. Demolition of buildings, to make room for station entrances and construction staging areas, began in February 2021.

Major construction on the extension began on May 13, 2021. "Traffic decks" began to be installed over Mount Pleasant, Broadway–City Hall, Oak–VGH, South Granville, and Arbutus stations, to avoid closing Broadway while station construction takes place underneath. Construction of the elevated guideway at the eastern end of the extension began on December 13, 2021. This 700-metre-long (2,300 ft) guideway is the only above-ground portion of the extension and connects the existing VCC–Clark station to a tunnel portal adjacent to the Emily Carr University of Art and Design.

The tunnel boring machines for the project were delivered to Vancouver between April and June 2022. Two identical machines, each 6 metres (20 ft) in diameter and 150 metres (490 ft) in length, would dig about 18 metres (59 ft) of tunnel per day, at a depth of 15 to 20 metres (49 to 66 ft) below the surface. The two machines were named Elsie and Phyllis, honouring two influential Vancouver residents: aeronautical engineer Elsie MacGill and mountaineer Phyllis Munday. Elsie began tunnelling the eastbound tunnel from Great Northern Way–Emily Carr station in October 2022, with Phyllis beginning work on the westbound tunnel in late November. Both machines had reached Broadway–City Hall station by May 26, 2023, and South Granville station by February 8, 2024. Phyllis completed boring at Arbutus station on March 20, 2024, and the tunnel boring phase was fully completed when Elsie reached Arbutus on April 26, 2024.

In May 2026, the project advanced to a dynamic testing phase, where SkyTrain trains are run on the newly built section through 2027. The phase allows crews to confirm that the trains, safety, and signalling components operate safely together. Testing is conducted in phases, including train clearance, positioning, and multiple trains on the same tracks. Additional construction and installation of electrical and mechanical equipment occurs in parallel, while train testing involves manually controlled trains starting from VCC–Clark station before continuing towards Arbutus station. On September 24, 2026, the provincial government announced that the construction project reached a major milestone with all the running, power, and LIM rails installed from its eastern to western terminus.

=== University of British Columbia extension ===
On January 14, 2008, the Government of British Columbia announced a commitment to the expansion of the Millennium Line to the University of British Columbia (UBC) by 2020 as part of a $14-billion transit spending package to address global warming. It was not clear what route the new line would take, but it was hinted that there would be less use of cut-and-cover tunnelling to minimize disruption to businesses along Broadway and avoid the same problems seen during the Canada Line construction along Cambie Street. This expansion failed to materialize.

On February 15, 2019, the TransLink Mayors' Council again approved an extension of the line to the UBC campus, although funding for this continuation past Arbutus Street had not yet been secured. In 2022, TransLink unveiled a proposed route for the extension: the line would continue west under Broadway, with stations at Macdonald and Alma Streets. It would then deviate slightly north to a station serving the redevelopment at the Jericho Lands. In the University Endowment Lands, the line would either take an elevated route following University Boulevard, or a tunnelled route underneath the University Golf Club, to get to UBC at a station under the University Boulevard bus loop. The station locations at Macdonald Street, Alma Street, and the Jericho Lands were approved by the Vancouver City Council in March 2022.

=== Port Coquitlam extension ===
When the Evergreen Extension was built, the first few metres of track and a track switch to allow for an eventual eastward extension to Port Coquitlam were built at Coquitlam Central station. This would create two branches where trains would alternate between going east to Lafarge Lake–Douglas station or to Port Coquitlam. A feasibility study was conducted, started during early 2020 and running for about six months. Port Coquitlam mayor Brad West, the Port Coquitlam city council, and the Coquitlam City Council all voiced support for the extension. However, as of 2026, no funding had been secured nor a formal plan created.

== Stations ==
Station	City	Connections	Location
VCC–Clark	Vancouver		East 6th Avenue at Clark Drive
Commercial–Broadway	Vancouver	Expo Line (SkyTrain) 99 B-Line	Commercial Drive at Broadway
Renfrew	Vancouver		Grandview Highway at Renfrew Street
Rupert	Vancouver		Broadway at Rupert Street
Gilmore	Burnaby		Lougheed Highway at Gilmore Avenue
Brentwood Town Centre	Burnaby	R2 Marine Dr	Lougheed Highway at Willingdon Avenue
Holdom	Burnaby		Lougheed Highway at Holdom Avenue
Sperling–Burnaby Lake	Burnaby		Lougheed Highway at Sperling Avenue; near Burnaby Lake
Lake City Way	Burnaby		Lougheed Highway at Lake City Way
Production Way–University	Burnaby	SFU	Lougheed Highway at Production Way
Lougheed Town Centre	Burnaby	Expo Line (SkyTrain)	Lougheed Highway at Austin; adjacent to the City of Lougheed shopping centre
Burquitlam	Coquitlam		Clarke Road at Smith Avenue
Moody Centre	Port Moody	West Coast Express	Barnet Highway at Williams Street
Inlet Centre	Port Moody		Barnet Highway at Ioco Road
Coquitlam Central	Coquitlam	West Coast Express R3 Lougheed Hwy	Barnet Highway at Pinetree Way
Lincoln	Coquitlam		Pinetree Way at Lincoln Avenue
Lafarge Lake–Douglas	Coquitlam		Pinetree Way at Guilford Way; adjacent to Lafarge Lake

== See also ==
- SkyTrain (Vancouver) rolling stock
