= Arbutus station =

Metro Vancouver SkyTrain station

Arbutus
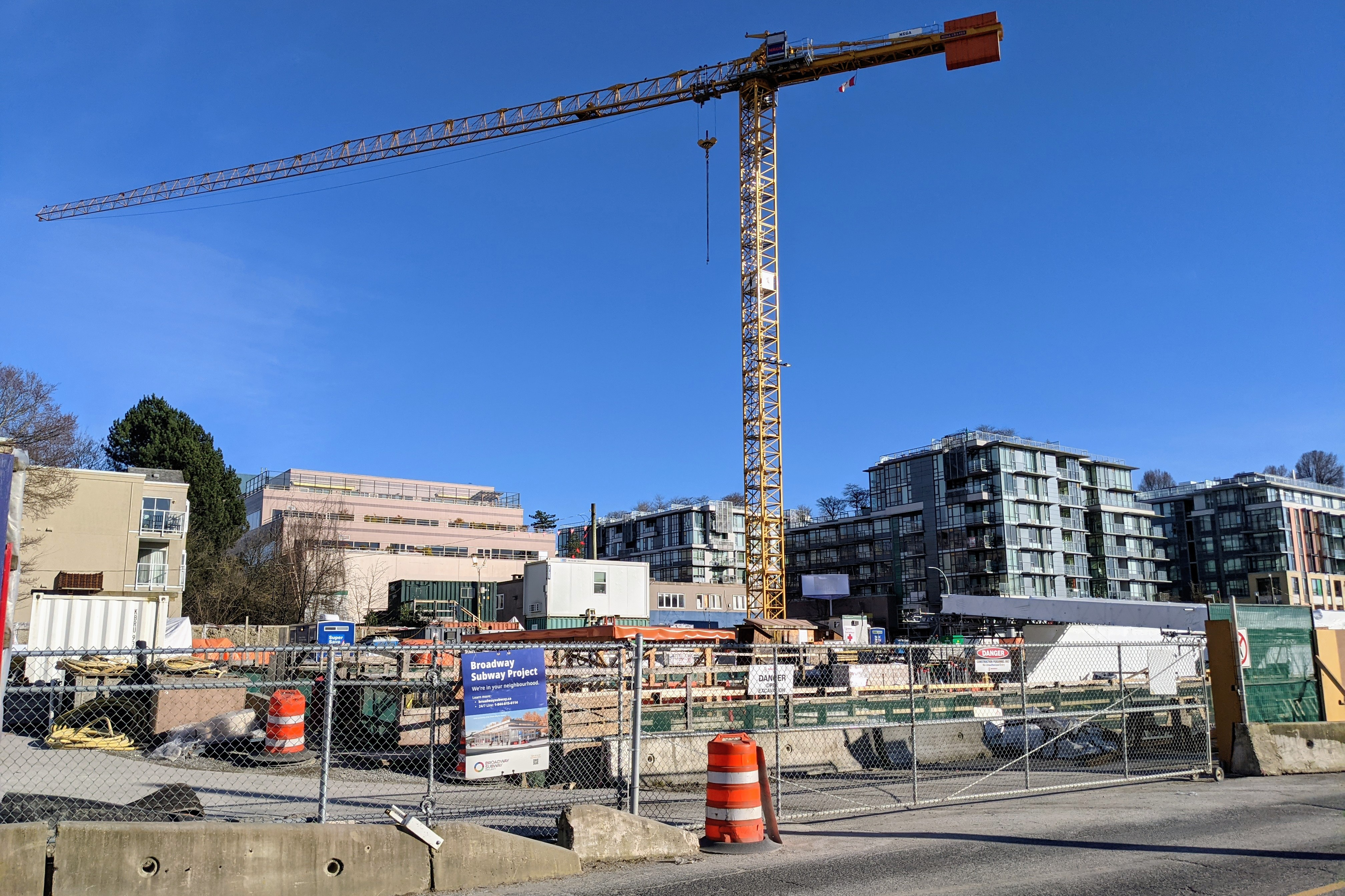
- Construction at the station site in February 2026

General information
- Location: Vancouver
- Coordinates: 49.264111°N 123.152630°W
- System: SkyTrain station
- Owner: TransLink
- Platforms: Centre platform
- Tracks: 2

Construction
- Structure type: Subway
- Accessible: Yes

Other information
- Status: Under construction
- Fare zone: 1

History
- Opening: 2027 (1 year's time)

Services
Preceding station	TransLink	Following station
Terminus	Millennium Line Broadway extension (opens 2027)	South Granville towards Lafarge Lake–Douglas
Location

Arbutus is an underground station under construction on the Millennium Line of Metro Vancouver's SkyTrain rapid transit system. It will be located at the northeast corner of the intersection of West Broadway and Arbutus Street in the Kitsilano neighbourhood of Vancouver, British Columbia, Canada, and will be the western terminus of the Millennium Line when completed. Originally scheduled to open in 2025, the station's projected opening has been pushed back twice; as of May 2024, it is scheduled to open in late 2027.

The station will provide a connection to the Arbutus Greenway. Passengers continuing to the University of British Columbia (UBC) will have to transfer to a 99 B-Line bus to continue west along Broadway. As the planned new eastern terminus of the 99 B-Line, the station design includes a bus loop. There have been proposals to extend the Millennium Line all the way to UBC, but as of May 2020, funding for that proposal had not been committed. Federal funding was being discussed as of February 2021.
