= Rocky Point Park =

Park in Port Moody, British Columbia, Canada

Coordinates: 49.2801°N 122.849°W

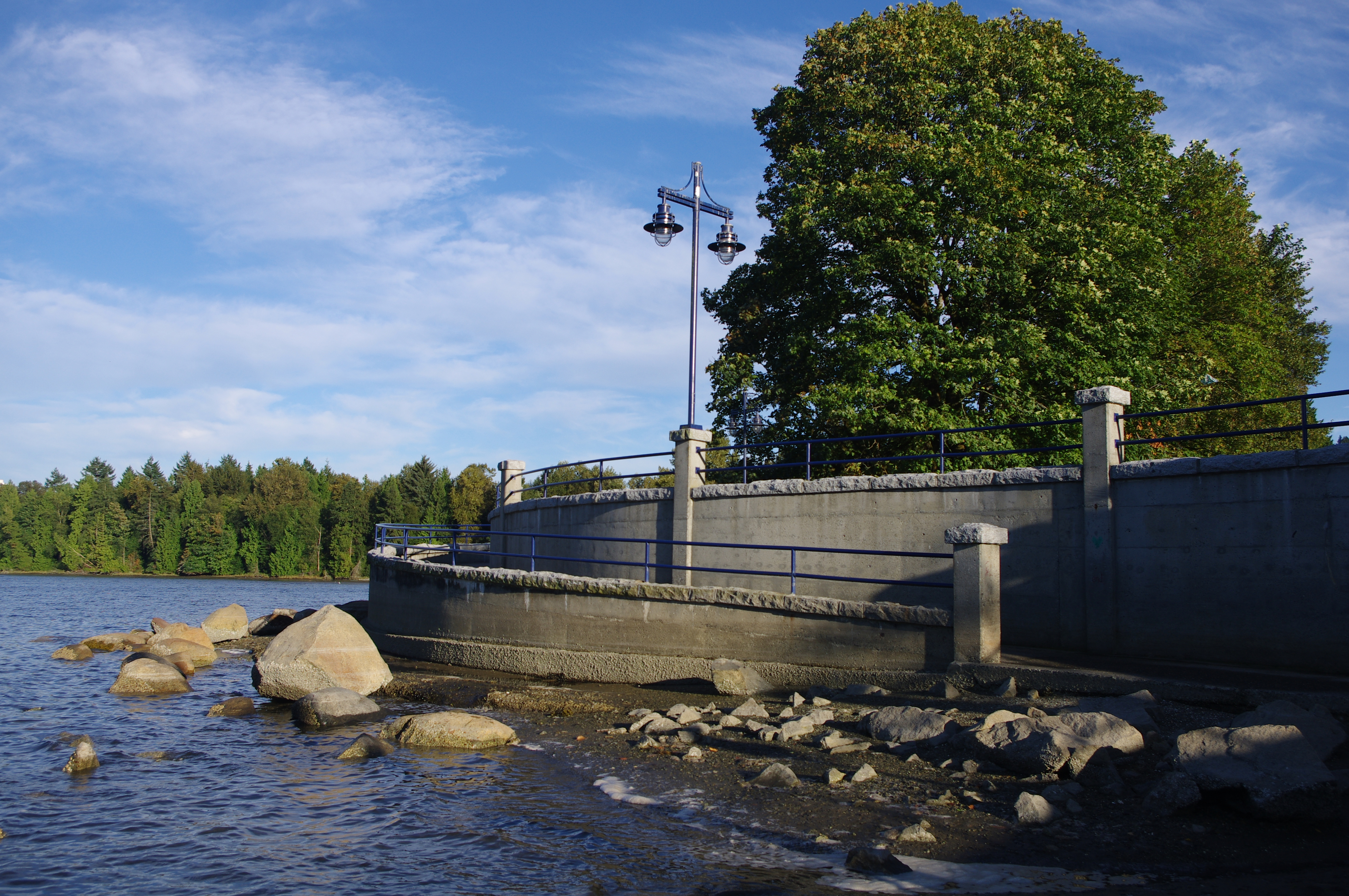
Rocky Point Park

Rocky Point Park, also known as Rocky Point, is situated along Burrard Inlet in Port Moody, British Columbia, next to the PoMo Museum. It is 3.8 hectares in size, and is the most well-known park in Port Moody.

Rocky Point has a variety of amenities including an outdoor swimming pool, splash pad, skateboard park, boat launch, hiking and cycling trails, and wildlife viewing. There is also a covered performance stage, and new warden houses have been built. The Old Mill Boat House is also located on the property, as well as a kayak and sailboat rental shack.

The park is also home to one of the five Pajo's Fish and Chips locations in the Lower Mainland, as well as a new Boathouse Restaurant location. Rocky Point Ice Cream is also located on the south side of the park. Many breweries are also located across the street.

Questions about shoreline erosion have also been raised, as in some areas, benches have been moved further back into the park as the shoreline fell into the inlet. Proper use of riprap may be a solution to this problem.

The park hosts the Golden Spike Days festival every July to commemorate the completion of the Canadian Pacific Railway in 1885. It also hosts many other events such as Canada Day.

On March 4, 2024, a 19-year-old man drove his car into the Burrard Inlet after being dared by Twitch streamer Adin Ross prompting the shutdown of the boat launch.
