= Scott Creek Middle School =

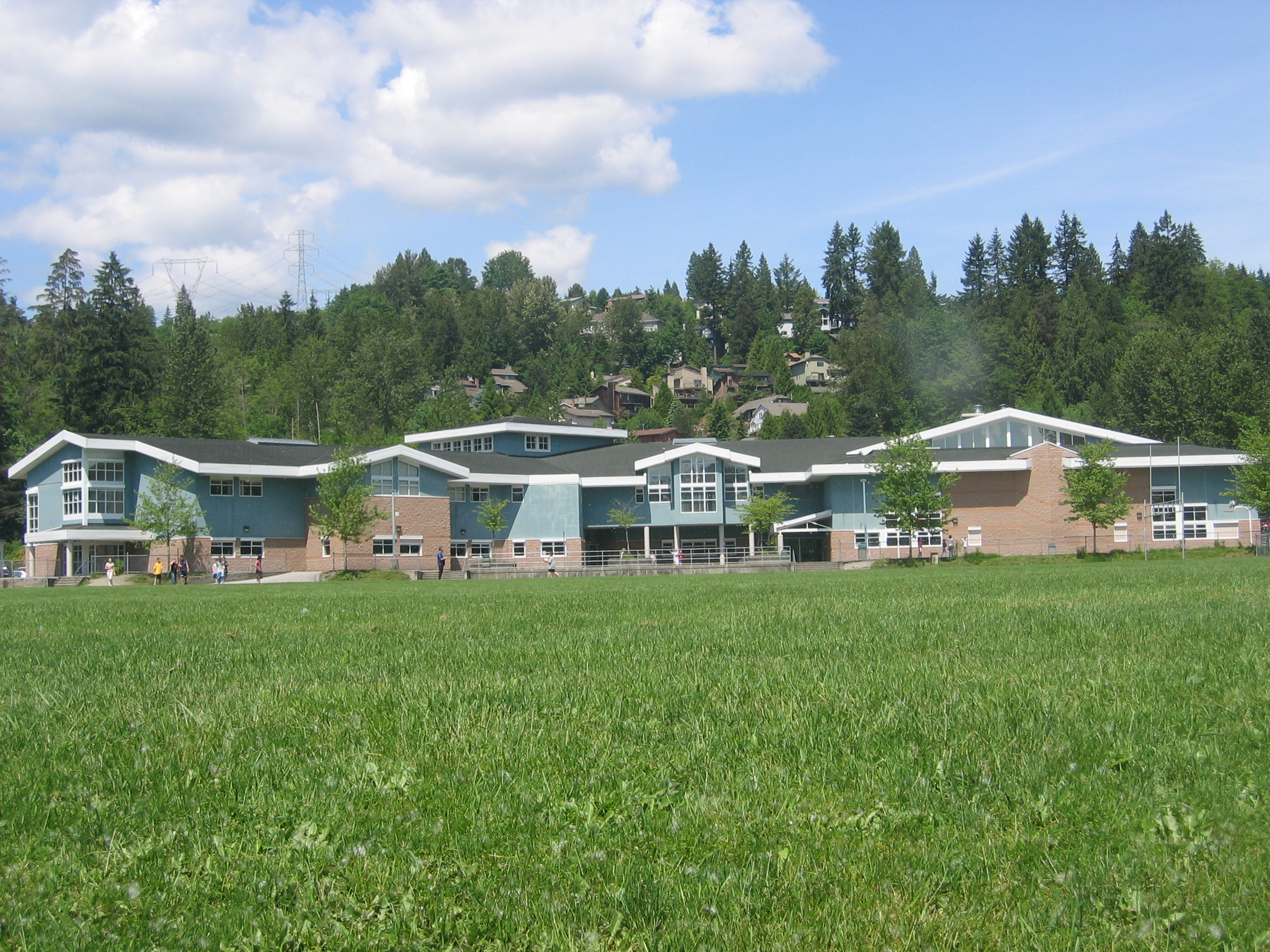

Location
- 1240 Lansdowne Drive; Coquitlam, British Columbia, V3E 3E7; Canada; 49.2849956°N 122.8155547°W

Information
- School type: Public Middle school
- Motto: "We Believe, We Can, We Will"
- Founded: 1996
- School board: School District 43 Coquitlam
- Superintendent: Robert Zambrano
- Principal: Daren Fridge
- Staff: 80
- Grades: Grades 6–8
- Enrollment: 639 (2024–25)
- Language: English
- Area: Eagle Ridge/Westwood Plateau
- Colours: Blue; Green; Burgundy; White
- Mascot: Coyote
- Team name: Scott Creek Coyotes
- Website: www.sd43.bc.ca/School/scottcreek/Pages/default.aspx#/=

Scott Creek Middle School, or simply Scott Creek, is a public middle school in Coquitlam, British Columbia serving grades six to eight. The school was founded in 1996, and is part of School District 43 Coquitlam.

The school is located at 1240 Lansdowne Drive, halfway between Port Moody and Coquitlam Centre. The school sports teams are all called the Scott Creek Coyotes. As of 2025, the school principal is Daren Fridge.

== History ==
The school opened on September 30, 1996, with a student population of 718. It was named after Scott Creek, a creek adjacent to the school. The building has 6,033 square metres of area contained in two stories. The school property has two large fields with one baseball diamond, and several additional outdoor athletic facilities.

On April 22, 2015, the school was a victim of a false bomb threat. At 8 a.m. that day, the Coquitlam RCMP received a phone call reporting a bomb at the school. The school was evacuated until it was determined to be safe to re-enter the building.

== Academics and athletics ==
Scott Creek offers a full program of academics as well as an explorations program consisting of visual arts, home economics, technology education, information technology, performing arts and physical education.

The regular school day is from 8:40 a.m. to 2:57 p.m., and includes six classroom periods, a 15-minute recess break, and a 45-minute lunch break. Several music programs are also offered. Scott Creek offers beginner band, advanced band, and choir classes. These classes are outside of the regular school day and are held in the morning from 7:45 a.m. until 8:30 a.m.

Scott Creek also offers an athletics program in which students may choose to represent the school in a competitive sports team. Some sports played by the school include volleyball, field hockey, basketball, wrestling, track and field, rugby, and badminton.

In past years, the school has served as the starting site of the Cops for Cancer Tour de Coast, a nine-day event that raises money to support families with cancer. The school was chosen since it was the top fundraising school for several consecutive years. In 2011, the school population had raised $10,667.81.
