= Adin Ross =

American online streamer (born 2000)

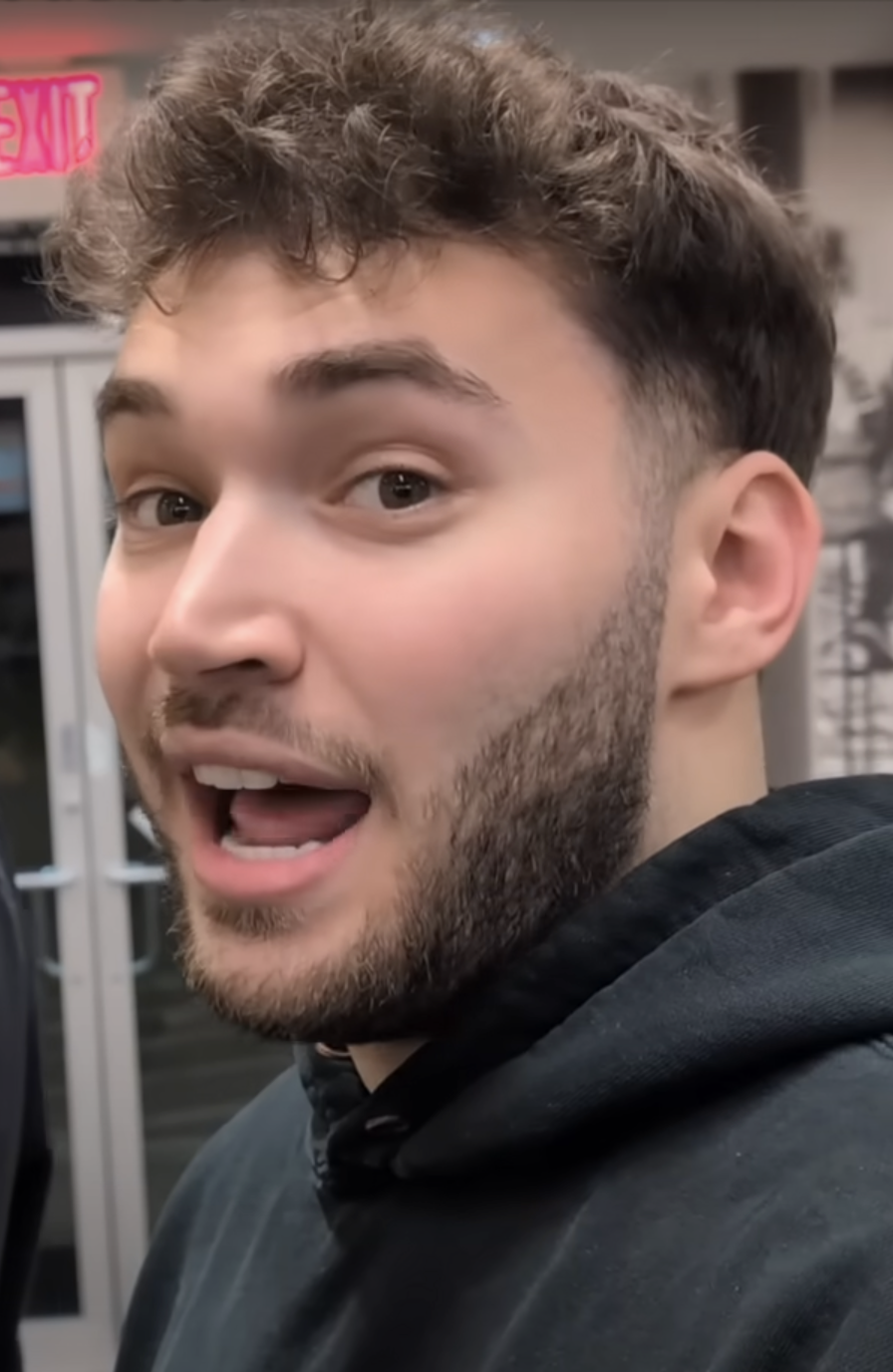
- Ross in 2025
- Born: Adin David Ross; October 11, 2000 (age 26); Boca Raton, Florida, U.S.
- Occupations: Live streamer; YouTuber

Kick information
- Channel: AdinRoss
- Years active: 2023–present
- Followers: 1.8 million

Twitch information
- Channel: AdinRoss
- Years active: 2014–2023; 2026–present
- Followers: 7 million

YouTube information
- Channel: Adin Live
- Years active: 2014–present
- Subscribers: 4.61 million
- Views: 1.671 billion
- Last updated: November 13, 2025

Adin David Ross (born October 11, 2000) is an American internet personality and online streamer. He is known for his collaborations with celebrities and livestreams of the NBA 2K and Grand Theft Auto V video games. He previously streamed on Twitch, from which he was indefinitely banned in 2023. However, the ban was lifted in March 2025, allowing him to return to the platform. A few days before his initial ban, he signed with the livestreaming service Kick.

== Early life ==
Adin David Ross was born to Jewish parents on October 11, 2000, in Boca Raton, Florida. He moved to New York City for a brief period of time, before moving to Three Rivers, California.

== Career ==
Ross began regularly streaming on Twitch while living with his sister Naomi. He eventually joined an NBA 2K group called Always Excelling and met basketball player Bronny James through it. He gained popularity by playing NBA 2K20 with James and doing wager matches with other streamers and YouTubers.

In December 2022, Ross was in talks to interview Kanye West following his controversial remarks about Jewish people, but decided not to do so after West reportedly told Ross on a phone call: "you Jews aren't going to tell me what I can and can't say."

After influencer Andrew Tate was arrested in Romania on December 29, 2022, five people had been authorized to visit Tate in detention, including Ross, who said he was flying to Romania, but was denied access by the Romanian government. In March 2024, Ross said that Tate had told him he would leave the country soon, resulting in Tate and his brother Tristan being arrested to prevent them from fleeing the country. He later apologized to Tate during a livestream, saying that he "really really effed up".

In 2023, shortly before his permanent Twitch ban, Ross began streaming on Kick. He generated controversy for livestreaming Super Bowl LVII and opening the Pornhub website while streaming.

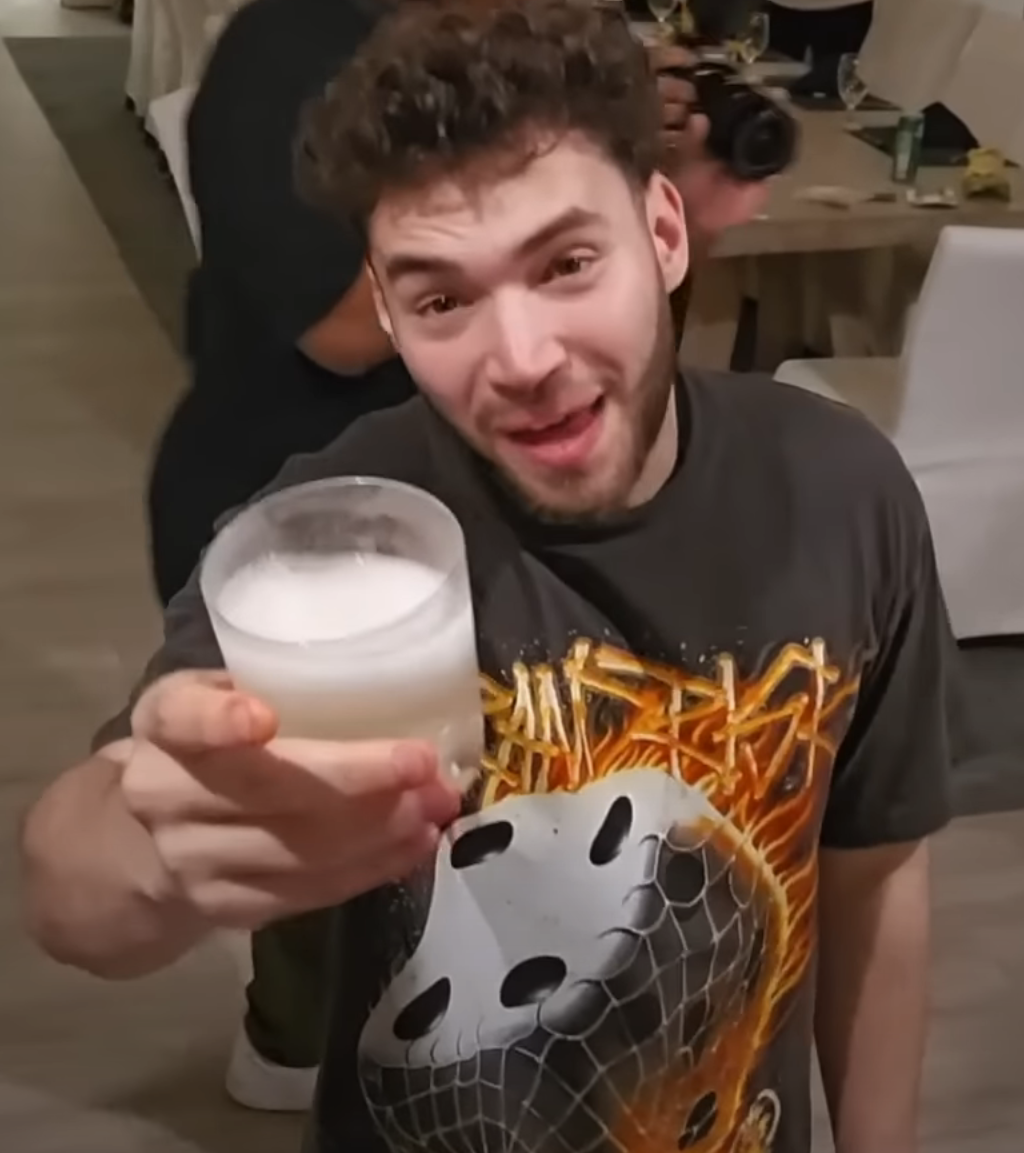
Ross during a livestream in 2024

On March 4, 2024, Ross dared a 19-year-old man to drive his car into Burrard Inlet at Rocky Point Park in Port Moody, Canada. After the police were notified, the man was arrested at the scene. The incident received negative attention from those who visit the park.

In August 2024, Ross interviewed then-former president Donald Trump on his stream, while wearing a Make America Great Again hat, expressing his support for him and telling his viewers to vote for Trump in the 2024 election. The stream had more than 500,000 concurrent viewers at its peak.

On December 17, 2025, Ross taught Los Angeles Rams wide receiver Puka Nacua a touchdown dance that was widely criticized as antisemitic, including by California gubernatorial candidate Rep. Eric Swalwell. Nacua apologized for the dance, claiming he had no idea it targeted Jews. Ross did not apologize.

In February 2026, Ross claimed that he bought the house featured in the television series Breaking Bad located in Albuquerque, New Mexico, and has plans to preserve it as "a monument".

In June 2026, The Wall Street Journal reported that Ross has a multi-million dollar deal with Polymarket to promote the company during streams.

=== Twitch bans ===
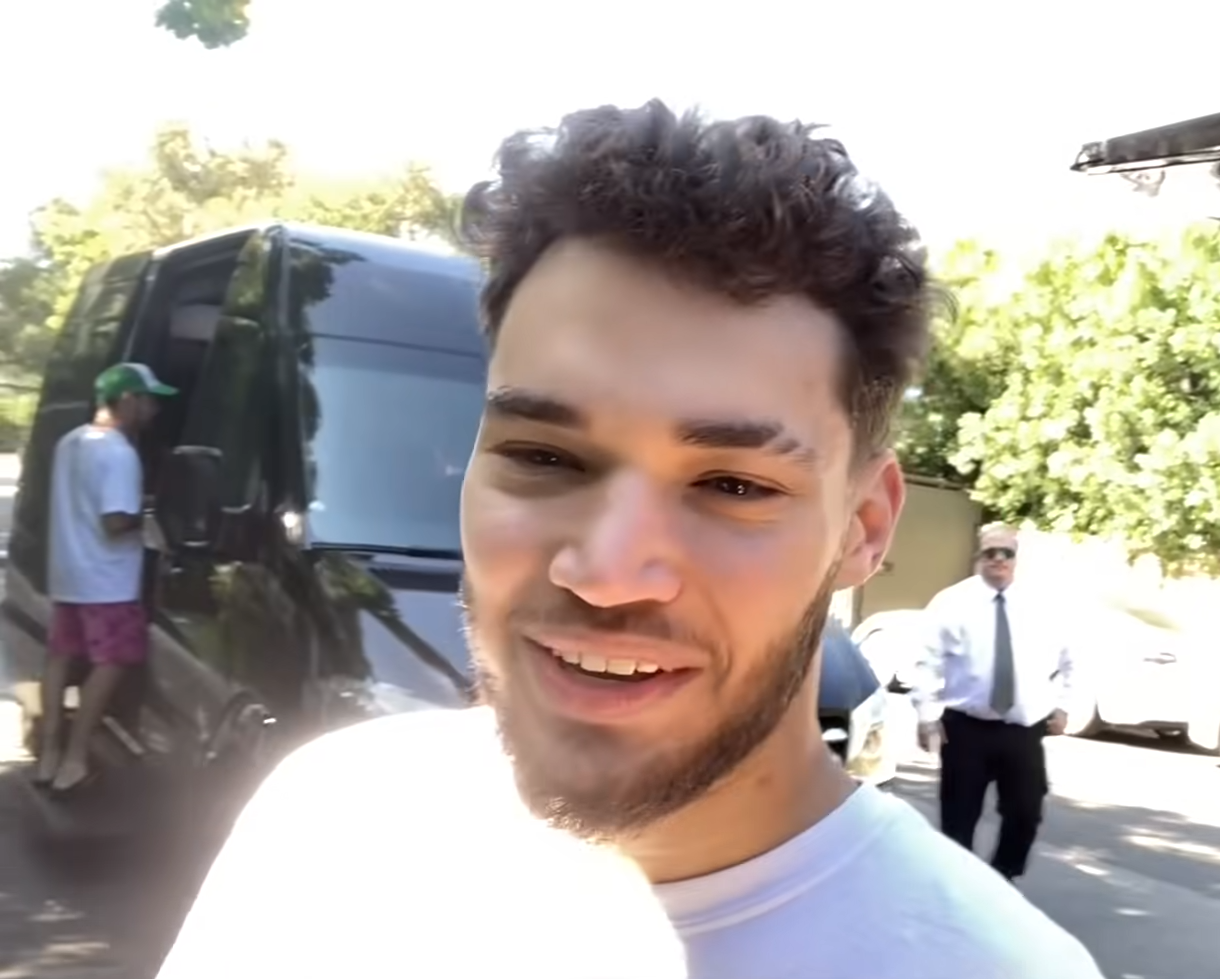
Ross in 2021

On April 10, 2021, Ross was banned from Twitch after YouTuber Zias used a homophobic slur while on Ross's stream. Ross defended himself from the ban by saying to Twitch staff that he did not say the word and was not in the room at the time. Twitch clarified that based on this information he would be allowed to stream. His followers started trending the hashtag #FreeAdin on Twitter in an attempt to pressure Twitch to reverse its decision. His ban was lifted on April 12, 2021.

Over a year later, on April 20, 2022, Ross was banned indefinitely. Twitch cited use of "hateful slurs or symbols," likely stemming from Ross's use of a homophobic slur while a guest on streamer YourRage's stream. He was able to resume streaming in June 2022.

On February 25, 2023, Ross received his eighth and most severe ban from Twitch for "hateful conduct" after displaying his unmoderated Kick live chat on stream, which included "multiple racist and anti-semitic comments", leading to a permanent suspension. On March 29, 2025, Twitch lifted this ban, allowing Ross to return to the platform.

== Personal life ==
On January 15, 2026, Ross' sister Madeline died at age 36. Ross, as well as his parents Mark Ross and Jayne Frankel, filed a lawsuit against the Broward County Medical Examiner’s Office, seeking to block the release of records relating to Madeline Ross’ cause of death.

In 2025, Ross was reported to have laid tefillin with Chabad activist Yossi Farro.

=== Politics ===
Ross expressed support for the Republican Party and Donald Trump during the 2024 United States presidential election as well as interviewing Trump on his livestream. Ross has also hosted the far-right political pundit Nick Fuentes on his stream multiple times.

In August 2025, Ross confirmed that he had voted for Trump but expressed disagreement with some of his actions, particularly regarding the release of files related to Jeffrey Epstein, which Ross said Trump had campaigned on. In October 2025, Ross expressed regret over his involvement in politics and his support for Trump, saying that he wished he had never become politically involved and was unlikely to support another politician in the future, citing the effect it had on his public image.

== Awards and nominations ==
Year	Ceremony	Category	Work	Result	Ref.
2024	The Streamer Awards	Best Streamed Collab	Stream with Donald Trump	Nominated	

== See also ==
- List of most-followed Twitch channels
- List of YouTubers
