= School District 43 Coquitlam =

School district in British Columbia, Canada

- School District 43 Coquitlam Logo

Location
- Coquitlam Coquitlam, Port Coquitlam, Port Moody, Anmore, Belcarra Canada

District information
- Superintendent: Nadine Tambellini
- Chair of the board: Kerri Palmer Isaak
- Schools: 70
- Budget: CA$522 million (2025-26)

Students and staff
- Students: 35,000
- Teachers: 2600
- Staff: 4500

Other information
- Website: www.sd43.bc.ca

School District No. 43 (Coquitlam) or SD43 is one of the sixty school districts in British Columbia. The district is the third-largest in British Columbia with 45 elementary schools, 14 middle schools, and 11 secondary schools. School District No. 43 (Coquitlam) serves the Tri-Cities, including the cities of Coquitlam, Port Coquitlam, Port Moody, and the villages of Anmore and Belcarra. The school district covers an area of 120 square kilometres and serves a total of over 260 residents. It has over 400 full-time and part-time employees. It has one of the highest graduation rates in the province, with 97% of students graduating in the 2024/25 school year.

== School trustees ==
The five municipalities served by SD43 are represented by elected trustees that serve on the Board of Education. There are currently nine trustees in SD43:

- Kerri Palmer Isaak, Chair (Anmore/Belcarra)
- Craig Woods, Vice Chair (Coquitlam)
- Chuck Denison, Trustee (Coquitlam)
- Candace Knoll, Trustee (Coquitlam)
- Rosey Manhas, Trustee (Coquitlam)
- Christine Pollock, Trustee (Port Coquitlam)
- Blaire West, Trustee (Port Coquitlam)
- Tracy Green, Trustee (Port Moody)
- Jessica Morrison, Trustee (Port Moody)

== District Programs ==
- Diverse Student Services
- Core French
- Early French Immersion (starting in Kindergarten, or Grade 1)
- Late French Immersion some schools include: Montgomerey Middle, École Citadel, École Moody and etc. (starting in Grade 6)
- Montessori Alternate Program
- EAL/Multiculturalism
- International Education
- MACC (Middle Age Cluster Class|Grades 6 - 8)
- Continuing Education
- Community Schools
- Settlement Workers In School
- District wide gifted programming
- Summer Learning
- Aboriginal Education
- International Baccalaureate
- Reggio-influenced Program
- Variety of Career and Trades

By 2020 it worked with the Confucius Institute with making Chinese cultural and Mandarin language programs in its schools. In 2020 the Globe and Mail stated that the organization "has taken a more expansive role, providing resources for core courses".

=== French Immersion ===
The first French Immersion program in SD43 was implemented in 1968 at Alderson Elementary. In 1978, the district implemented a late French Immersion program. Currently there are 5,900 students enrolled in the program. This comprises 10.3% of the total district student population.

=== Coquitlam Open Learning ===
SD43 offers online, Learning Centre, and FastTrack courses to eligible British Columbia students through Coquitlam Open Learning (COL). Learning Centre courses are online or paper-based and allow the student to drop in at the Coquitlam Learning Opportunity Centre (CLOC), while FastTrack courses have some regularly schedule classes, with the rest of the course instruction occurring online.

COL also operates Inquiry Hub Secondary School, which is an alternate secondary school focused on a flexible and inquiry-based education. Students learn through online study, group project work, personal inquiry time, and seminars. It opened September 2012 at the former site of Millside Elementary. The school meets Ministry of Education requirements while still allowing students to meet learning outcomes with a more flexible approach. Most recently, the school received the 2014-15 Ken Spencer Award for Innovation in Teaching and Learning.

== Elementary schools ==
School	Location	Grades	Principal	Address
Alderson Elementary School	Coquitlam	K-5	Anita Strang	825 Gauthier Avenue
Anmore Elementary School	Anmore	K-5	Michael Chan	30 Elementary Road
Aspenwood Elementary School	Port Moody	K-5	Janine Close	2001 Panorama Drive
Baker Drive Elementary School	Coquitlam	K-5	Jamieson Joe	885 Baker Drive
Birchland Elementary School	Port Coquitlam	K-5	Elspeth Anjos	1331 Fraser Avenue
Blakeburn Elementary School	Port Coquitlam	K-5	Michele Reid	1040 Riverside Drive
Bramblewood Elementary School	Coquitlam	K-5	Michael Bird	2875 Panorama Drive
Cape Horn Elementary School	Coquitlam	K-5	Kim Cuellar	155 Finnigan Street
Castle Park Elementary School	Port Coquitlam	K-5	Andrew Corbould	1144 Confederation Drive
Cedar Drive Elementary School	Port Coquitlam	K-5	Rick Dhaliwal	3150 Cedar Drive
Central Community School	Port Coquitlam	K-5	Shawn O'Brien	2260 Central Avenue
Coast Salish Elementary School	Coquitlam	K-5	Frank Pearse	3538 Sheffield Avenue
Coquitlam River Elementary School	Port Coquitlam	K-5	David Mushens	4250 Shaughnessy Street
Eagle Ridge Elementary School	Coquitlam	K-5	Don Hutchinson	1215 Falcon Drive
Glen Elementary School	Coquitlam	K-5	Nicole Daneault	3064 Glen Drive
Glenayre Elementary School	Port Moody	K-5	Andrew Lloyd	495 Glencoe Drive
Hampton Park Elementary School	Coquitlam	K-5	Colleen Castonguay	1760 Paddock Drive
Harbour View Elementary School	Coquitlam	K-5	Daren Fridge	960 Lillian Street
Hazel Trembath Elementary School	Port Coquitlam	K-5	Dave Phelan	1278 Confederation Drive
Heritage Mountain Elementary School	Port Moody	K-5	Jonathan Sclater	125 Ravine Drive
Irvine Elementary School	Port Coquitlam	K-5	Dennis Shannon	3862 Wellington Street
James Park Elementary School	Port Coquitlam	K-5	Rob Wright	1761 Westminster Avenue
Kilmer Elementary School	Port Coquitlam	K-5	Theresa Roberts	1575 Knappen Street
Leigh Elementary School	Coquitlam	K-5	Bryn Williams	1230 Soball Road
Lord Baden-Powell Elementary School	Coquitlam	K-5	Mike Parkins	450 Joyce Street
Mary Hill Elementary School	Port Coquitlam	K-5	Jason Hewlett	1890 Humber Crescent
Meadowbrook Elementary School	Coquitlam	K-5	Tara Fisher	900 Sharpe Street
Miller Park Community School	Coquitlam	K-5	Tanya MacDonald	800 Egmont Avenue
Moody Elementary School	Port Moody	K-5	Sheila Rawnsley	110 Buller Street
Mountain Meadows Elementary School	Port Moody	K-5	Genevieve McMahon	999 Noons Creek Drive
Mountain View Elementary School	Coquitlam	K-5	Lisa Salloum	740 Smith Ave
Mundy Road Elementary School	Coquitlam	K-5	Deana McLean	2200 Austin Avenue
Nestor Elementary School	Coquitlam	K-5	Chris Hunter	1266 Nestor Street
Panorama Heights Elementary School	Coquitlam	K-5	Ashif Jiwa	1455 Johnson Street
Parkland Elementary School	Coquitlam	K-5	Chris Hunter	1563 Regan Avenue
Pinetree Way Elementary School	Coquitlam	K-5	Cheryl Woods	1420 Pinetree Way
Pleasantside Elementary School	Port Moody	K-5	Ceri Watkins	195 Barber Street
Porter Street Elementary School	Coquitlam	K-5	Rachel French	728 Porter Street
R.C. MacDonald Elementary School	Coquitlam	K-5	Martin Bozic	2550 Leduc Avenue
Ranch Park Elementary School	Coquitlam	K-5	Kelly Zimmer	2701 Spuraway Avenue
Riverview Park Elementary School	Coquitlam	K-5	Shannon Bain	700 Clearwater Way
Rochester Elementary School	Coquitlam	K-5	Cheryl Lloyd	411 Schoolhouse Street
Roy Stibbs Elementary School	Coquitlam	K-5	Britt Walton	600 Fairview Street
Seaview Community School	Port Moody	K-5	Larry Ryan	1215 Cecile Drive
Smiling Creek Elementary School	Coquitlam	K-5	Rob Killawee	3456 Princeton Ave
Walton Elementary School	Coquitlam	K-5	Marco Jankowiak	2960 Walton Avenue
Westwood Elementary School	Port Coquitlam	K-5	Stacey Parmar	3610 Hastings Street

== Middle schools ==
School	Location	Grades	Principal	Vice Principal	Address
Banting Middle School	Coquitlam	6-8	Tristan McChicken	Christine Bald	820 Banting Street
Citadel Middle School	Port Coquitlam	6-8	Mark Clay	Rachel French	1265 Citadel Drive
Como Lake Middle School	Coquitlam	6-8	Devan Ross	Christine Wald	1121 King Albert Avenue
Eagle Mountain Middle School	Anmore/Port Moody	6-8	Andrew Graham	Jennifer Penk	110 Dogwood Drive
Hillcrest Middle School	Coquitlam	6-8	Ross Jacobsen	Jeff Hart	2161 Regan Avenue
Kwayhquitlum Middle School	Port Coquitlam	6-8	Laurie Sviatko	Frank Lore	3280 Flint Street
Maillard Middle School	Coquitlam	6-8	Steve Roos	Harpreet Esmail	1300 Rochester Avenue
Maple Creek Middle School	Port Coquitlam	6-8	Darren Macmillan	Ian Robertson	3700 Hastings Street
Minnekhada Middle School	Port Coquitlam	6-8	Jill Reid	Kirsten Paterson	1390 Laurier Avenue
Montgomery Middle School	Coquitlam	6-8	Sarah Husband	Rob Heinrichs	1900 Edgewood Avenue
Moody Middle School of the Arts	Port Moody	6-8	Tamara Banks	Jonathan Sclater	130 Buller St
Pitt River Community School	Port Coquitlam	6-8	Bryn Williams	Greg Schellenberg	2070 Tyner Street
Scott Creek Middle School	Coquitlam	6-8	Lisa Rinke	Anthony Veltri	1240 Lansdowne Drive
Summit Middle School	Coquitlam	6-8	Bill Trask	James Morton	1450 Parkway Boulevard

== Secondary schools ==
School	Location	Grades	Principal	Address
CABE Secondary School	Coquitlam	10-12	Sandi Lauzon	1411 Foster Avenue
Centennial Secondary School	Coquitlam	9-12	Anthony Ciolfitto	570 Poirier Street
Dr. Charles Best Secondary School	Coquitlam	9-12	Heather Murphy	2525 Como Lake Avenue
Gleneagle Secondary School	Coquitlam	9-12	Mark Clay	1195 Lansdowne Drive
Heritage Woods Secondary School	Port Moody	9-12	Todd Clerkson	1300 David Avenue
Inquiry Hub Secondary School	Coquitlam	9-12	David Truss	1432 Brunette Avenue
Pinetree Secondary School	Coquitlam	9-12	Janine Close	3000 Pinewood Avenue
Port Moody Secondary School	Port Moody	9-12	Glen Conley	300 Albert Street
Riverside Secondary School	Port Coquitlam	9-12	Jon Bruneau	2215 Reeve Street
Terry Fox Secondary School	Port Coquitlam	9-12	David Starr	1260 Riverwood Gate

== See also ==
- List of school districts in British Columbia
