= Heritage Woods Secondary School =

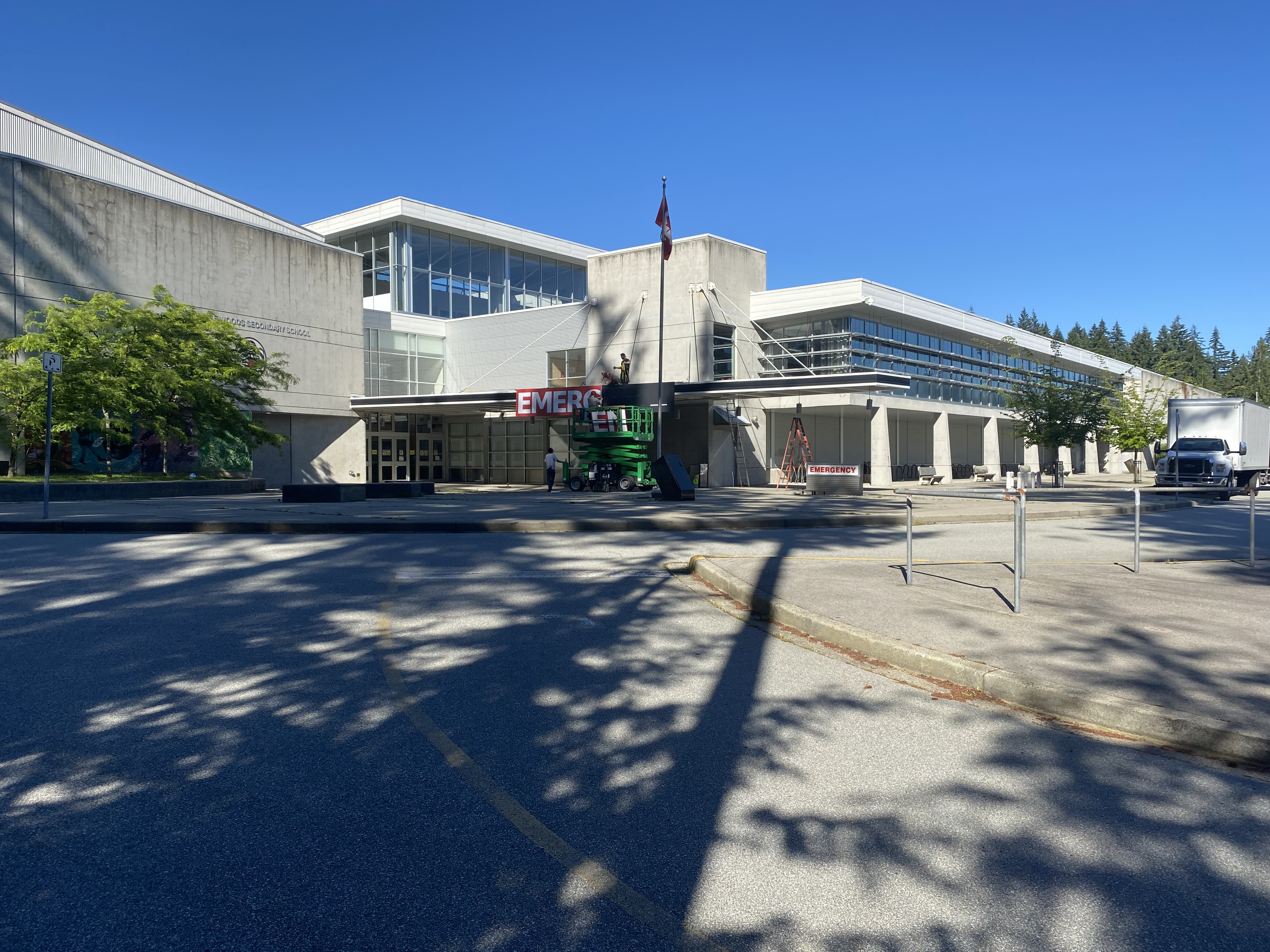

Location
- 1300 David Avenue; Port Moody, British Columbia, V3H 5K6; Canada; 49°17′55″N 122°50′28″W

Information
- School type: Coeducational Secondary
- Motto: 1, 2, 3: KODIAKS!
- Founded: September 7, 2004
- School board: School District 43 Coquitlam
- School number: 605-475-6959
- Principal: Cheryl Woods
- Grades: 9-12
- Enrollment: 1500 (2016/2017)
- Language: English
- Colour: Maroon Silver Black
- Mascot: Kody The Kodiak
- Team name: The Kodiaks
- Website: www.heritagewoods.sd43.bc.ca

Heritage Woods Secondary School is a coeducational high school located in Port Moody, British Columbia. In 2007, Heritage Woods celebrated their first graduating class. As well, it was rated as one of the top 50 schools in British Columbia for 2007, 2008 and 2010 and top 30 in 2012 by the Fraser Institute. As of the 2013/2014 school year, it is ranked at 52nd in the province with a score of 7.7/10.

== Technology ==
There are six computer labs for students to work in—two dedicated to general use, one for film and animation, one for photography, one for computer information, and one for technology education—as well as another twenty terminals in the library. Most teachers in the school are supplied with tablet computers which, in turn, are connected to a projector, permanently mounted on the ceiling of every classroom; the projectors are used for teaching lessons, watching movies, making presentations, and other similar functions. The main corridor of the building, dubbed the 'Grand Hall', also transmits a wireless internet signal for student use during the day. Wireless internet signals are also transmitted to every room in the building. However, because of the concrete composition of the school and placement of wireless access-points, its wireless signal strength around the school varies. As well as a wireless network, the school also has approximately forty laptops available for student use; however, a student may bring their own laptop as well. The increased usage of laptops in a number of courses provides added potential for student learning.

== Architecture and design ==
The school, which was completed in 2004, February, was featured in the Fall 2005 issue of Architecture BC, a publication of the Architectural Institute of British Columbia. Designed by Killick Metz Bowen Rose Architects Planners Inc., Heritage Woods was the first school in Canada to achieve a Silver LEED certification.

It has a sustainable design with numerous features including: compact and thermal-efficient building plan and envelope, building orientation on an east–west axis optimizing daylight and minimizing solar gain, effective daylight control shading devices and light shelves.

Daylight capture and control refers to the variety of means used to bring in the kind of daylight that is desirable and block the daylight that is not. This is achieved with use of the large windows, overhangs and shading devices light shelves sloped ceilings and the selective use of skylight.

The school can also provide its own power during a power outage via a generator located under the artificial turf.

== Use of the school in media ==
The 2006 teen comedy movie John Tucker Must Die was filmed on location at Heritage Woods. The filmmakers decided to use the Heritage Woods team name, the Kodiaks, in the film for its sports teams. In the movie, the school's name is Forest Hills High School. The use of the school by the filmmakers resulted in many benefits; some devices such as cameras were donated to the school after filming.

The school has also been used in the television shows Supernatural, Stargate Atlantis, Eureka and Defying Gravity. Furthermore, the school can be seen in a Dell and Coca-Cola commercial, while the artificial turf and grass fields were featured in a CTV commercial.

Heritage Woods can be seen in the TV movie Best Player starring Jennette McCurdy. It was used as the high school in the 2017 movie Wonder. The school was used in an episode of The Last of Us.

== Athletics ==
The school has a wide selection of athletics competing at the 4A level. In the fall, they have volleyball, field hockey, boys soccer, and swimming teams. Basketball, curling, lacrosse, ice hockey, ski and snowboard, and wrestling teams compete in the winter season. In the spring, badminton, golf, tennis, girls soccer, rugby and track and field compete. Throughout the last several years of being open, Heritage has won many Fraser Valley Championship banners, as well as a provincial banner in both Ice Hockey and Snowboarding, respectively.

The school also plays host to the yearly Kodiak Klassic, a Senior Boys Basketball tournament held at the beginning of December.

== Notable alumni ==
- Ryan Johansen, ice hockey player and Stanley Cup Finalist
- Samantha Wan, Canadian actress, screenwriter, producer, and web series creator.
