= Dr. Charles Best Secondary School =

École Dr. Charles Best Secondary School

Location
- 2525 Como Lake Avenue; Coquitlam, British Columbia, V3J 3R8; Canada; 49°15′50″N 122°49′20″W

Information
- School type: Co-educational public secondary
- Motto: Discover Your Best
- Founded: 1971
- School board: School District 43 Coquitlam
- Principal: Dave Cyr
- Grades: 9 to 12
- Enrollment: 1661 (2024–25)
- Language: English and French immersion
- Campus: Suburban
- Colours: Blue and gray
- Mascot: Blue Devil
- Team name: Best Blue Devils

Dr. Charles Best Secondary School is a co-educational public high school located in Coquitlam, British Columbia. The school is named for Canadian physician Charles Best, one of the researchers responsible for the discovery of insulin as a treatment for diabetes. The school opened on March 22, 1971, as a junior secondary school serving students in Grades 7 through 10, and became a full secondary school (grades 9 through 12) in 2000.

In 2006, the school's main sports field was replaced with a new FieldTurf surface. The Coquitlam Metro-Ford Soccer Club of the Pacific Coast Soccer League use this as their home ground.

== Programs ==
In 2001, the school added a French immersion program.

Dr. Charles Best Secondary School offers a joinery program that partners with the post-secondary institution British Columbia Institute of Technology (BCIT). Grade 12 students are eligible to join the program if they are interested in becoming a Red Seal qualified joiner (cabinetmaker).

The school offers an electrical studies program that is partnered with BCIT for grade 12 students interested in becoming electricians.

== Extracurricular activities ==
=== Athletics ===
Dr. Charles Best Secondary school's athletic team name is the Best Blue Devils. The jersey colours are white and blue, and the mascot is a blue devil. The school sports teams are: volleyball (girls and boys), basketball (girls and boys), soccer (girls and boys), field hockey (girls only), rugby (girls and boys), badminton (co-ed) and tennis (co-ed)as well as hockey alongside Centennial Secondary. (girls and boys)

=== Theatre ===
The student theatre group, called the Best Players, puts on two sets of plays every year. The performances in the fall are the school's contribution to Metfest, a district-wide theatre festival of one-act plays. The second performance is done in the spring, and it is a full length two-act play, alternating annually between a musical and a traditional play.
