= Port Moody Secondary School =

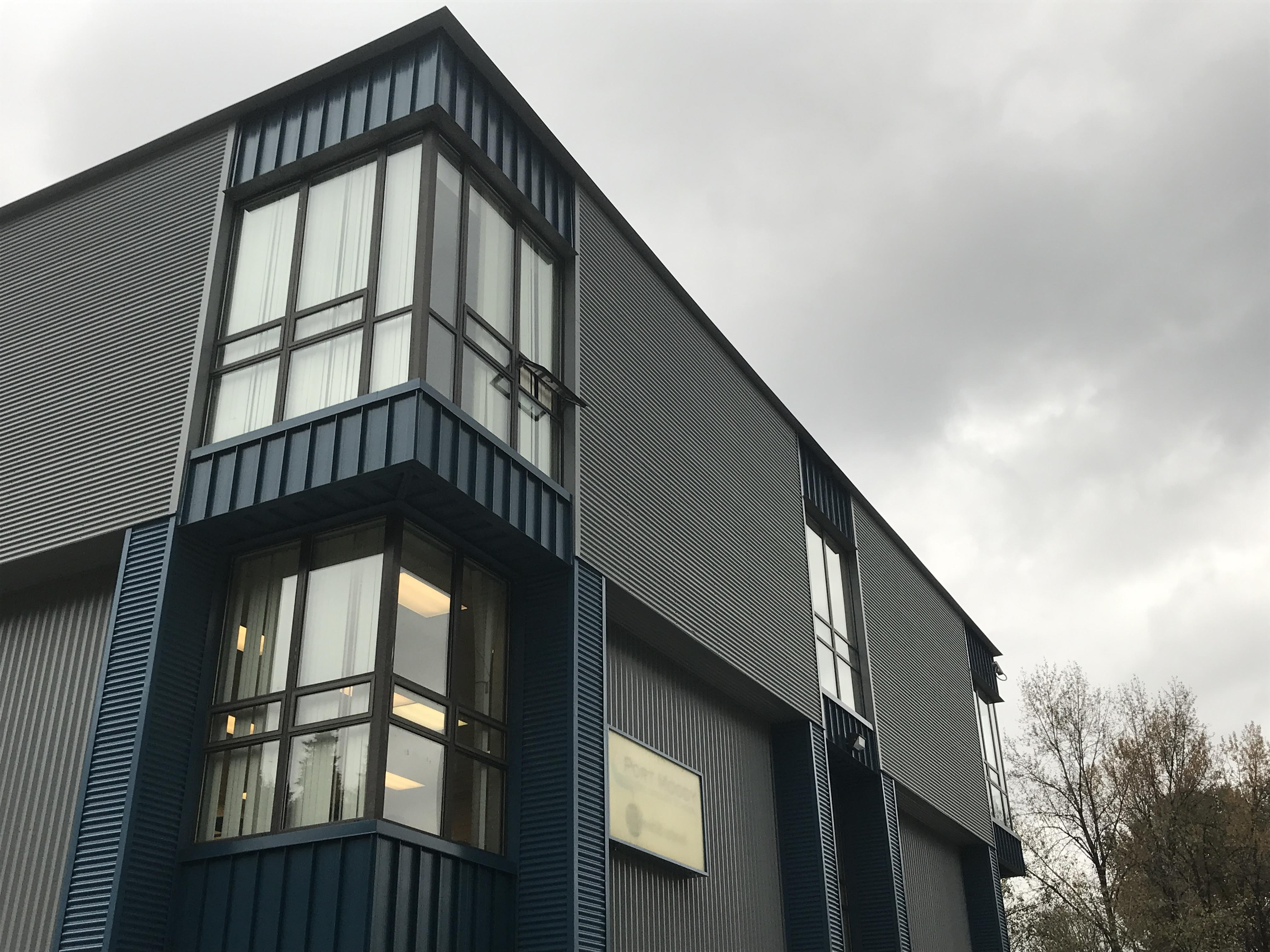

Location
- 300 Albert Street; Port Moody, British Columbia, V3H 2M5; Canada; 49°16′25″N 122°52′04″W

Information
- School type: Coeducational Public Secondary
- Religious affiliation: Secular
- School board: School District 43 Coquitlam
- School number: 4343088
- Principal: Andrew Lloyd
- Staff: 100
- Grades: 9 to 12
- Enrollment: 2000 (2024/2025)
- Language: English
- Campus: Suburban
- Area: Port Moody
- Colours: Blue and White
- Mascot: Phoenix
- Team name: Blues
- Newspaper: The Phoenix
- Nickname: Moody, PMSS
- Website: www.sd43.bc.ca/school/portmoody
- Last updated: February 1, 2026

Port Moody Secondary School is a public coeducational high school located in Port Moody, British Columbia. The school offers the International Baccalaureate Program and the Career Preparation Program to its students. There are approximately 400 students in the pre-International Baccalaureate Diploma programme and the International Baccalaureate diploma programme tracks. Port Moody serves grades nine through twelve and has an enrollment of about 1,500 students as of January 2019. The school is respected for its academics, visual arts, musical arts and athletic programs.

== History ==
The original Port Moody High School, which was located on the grounds of the current Moody Middle School, burned to the ground in 1969. A site was chosen for the new Port Moody Senior Secondary School, which opened in 1973. A mythological bird that rises from the ashes, "The Phoenix", was appropriately chosen as the school's new mascot. The team name selected was the Port Moody Blues. Built to accommodate 900 students, Port Moody Secondary has grown to a population of well over 1 300 and a staff of about 100. From 2000-2002, the school underwent renovation; the new three-story tower and gymnasium addition was completed. Enrollment at the school has dropped in recent years, due in part to the changing demographics of the neighbourhood it is located in. Port Moody also used to offer the Cambridge Latin Course.

== Extracurricular activities ==
Port Moody is home to numerous extracurricular clubs. The Student Council hosts events to benefit the school in many ways, including the annual Spring Fling and school dance. The school is also home to the PMSS Leadership Committee which hosts the annual Talent Show and has a comprehensive leadership program called SOAR. Humanitarian groups include Red Cross, UNICEF, Community Leadership Force, and MSF (Doctors Without Borders). The Debate Team had competed at the regional, provincial and national levels, winning the regional championship in 2012 and 2013, later coming 3rd overall in the country. Their debate team has also produced three national team members, who have gone on to win several international competitions. The school also has an Improv Team which takes yearly involvement in the Canadian Improv Games.

=== Clubs ===
- 20/20 Mission Club
- Applied Technologies
- Archery Club
- Art Club
- Auto Club
- Board Game Club
- Breaking the Cycle
- Bugz 'N' Plantz Club
- Cards with Regards
- Character Design Club
- Chess Club
- Chinese Culture Club
- Classic Literature Club
- Community Leadership Force (CLF)
- Crafts for Care
- Crochet Club
- Cryptography Club
- Cubing Club
- Dance Club
- Drumline Club
- Dungeons and Dragons Club
- eSports Club
- Film Club
- Film & Literature Appreciation Club
- First Aid Club
- Formula 1 Club
- Gift of Giving Club
- GSA (Global Societal Acceptance)
- Graphic Design Club
- Guitar Ensemble Club
- Hackathon Club
- Imaginary Travel Agency Club (ITA)
- Investing Club
- Jewelry Club
- Karaoke Club
- Korean Culture Club
- Language Club
- Literature Club
- Math Competition Club
- Model UN Club
- MSF (Doctors Without Borders) Club
- Paws For a Cause
- Photography Club
- PMSS History Club
- PMSS Soccer Club
- PMSS Tennis Club
- PMSS UNICEF
- Programming Club
- Reach for the Top Club
- Red Cross Club
- Relaxation Club
- Robotics Club
- Science Competition Club
- Scrapbooking Club
- Small Talk Club
- Student for High-Impact Charity (SHIC)
- Table Tennis Club
- The Blueprint
- The Lit Project
- UBC Cancer Association (UBCCA) Club
- Ukrainian Club
- Weightlifting Club
- Writer's Guild

=== Committees ===
- Student Voice
- Music Council
- Blues Spirit Crew
- Yearbook Committee
- SOAR
- Peer Tutoring
- Prom Committee
- The Blueprint School Newspaper

=== Athletics ===
Port Moody has many well-established sports teams. The cheer-leading team has achieved an average standard of excellence in competition in both Canada and the United States, the senior cheer team having won the national champion title in 2007. The girls rugby team has also achieved an average standard of excellence, placing provincially for many years: 6th in 2007, 4th in 2008, 2nd in 2009, and 6th in 2010. The rugby teams have also competed in England and Australia. The senior boys soccer team won the provincial championship in 2007. The senior badminton team has historically performed well, most recently placing 3rd in the 2020 BC Provincial Championship. The senior boys volleyball team were provincial champions in 1996.

==== Sports teams ====
- Basketball
- Badminton
- Cheerleading
- Cross country
- Field hockey- Girls
- Golf
- Hockey
- Lacrosse
- Rugby- Boys & Girls
- Ski & Snowboard Club
- Soccer
- Swimming
- Table tennis
- Tennis
- Track and field
- Volleyball
- Wrestling
- Ultimate Frisbee

=== Music ===
Port Moody has an arts program that runs the community jazz and concert bands. The school's concert band, jazz bands, and concert choir ensembles have competed at provincial or national levels, the drumline performing at provincial competitions where they achieved second in their category. The school has a multi-station MIDI lab and recording studio for the music technology courses offered. Port Moody is also the only school in the district that offers advanced art programs.

==== Music groups ====
- Concert Band (Junior Band)
- Community Band (Senior Band)
- Jazz Band (Junior, Intermediate, and Senior)
- String Orchestra
- Concert Choir
- Drumline
- Junior Drumline
- Pep Band
- Rock School Band

=== Dance ===
Port Moody also both a Junior and Senior Competitive dance team that has won multiple awards for their standard of excellence.

== Notable alumni ==
- Doug Brown, former NFLer and CFLer
- Corey Mace, NFLer
- Fred Ewanuick, actor
- Ronald Lam, figure skater
- Sophie Lui, Canadian journalist
- Omar Sachedina, Canadian journalist
