= Inlet Theatre =

Theatre in British Columbia, Canada

Coordinates: 49.282411°N 122.829975°W

The Inlet Theatre is a proscenium theatre located at the Port Moody Civic Centre in Port Moody, British Columbia, overlooking Burrard Inlet. The theatre regularly features plays, concerts, and dance performances, as well as a host of special events including the Port Moody Canadian Film Festival each February and the Festival of the Arts each April.

The theatre has up to 206 seats, with 159 permanent seats on the orchestra level, plus room for another 47 seats and wheelchairs (depending on event configuration).
