= NewPort Village =

Coordinates: 49.2827109°N 122.8267917°W

NewPort Village is a small commercial and residential area in Port Moody, British Columbia.

The area is located just east of the Burrard Inlet, and across Ioco Road from the city hall, library, and the arena. What is now NewPort Village used to be a forest; the area was not developed until the mid-1990s. Today it contains many small shops, low rise apartments and a few high rise apartments. It is served by Inlet Centre Station of the Millennium Line, which despite having some of the lowest ridership in the whole system, has spurred transit oriented development around it.
