= Inquiry Hub Secondary School =

School in Coquitlam, BC

Location
- 1432 Brunette Avenue; Coquitlam, British Columbia, V3K 6X5; Canada; 49°14′23″N 122°51′12″W

Information
- School type: Public, high school
- Motto: Dream, Create, Learn
- Established: 2012
- School district: School District 43 Coquitlam
- Principal: Dan Wyper
- Grades: 9-12
- Nickname: iHub
- Website: www.inquiryhub.org

Inquiry Hub Secondary School is a high school located in Coquitlam, BC, Canada. Established in 2012, it is part of School District 43 Coquitlam. It is a self-guided school that focuses on independent learning versus traditional classroom learning. In 2022, it contained 87 people (including staff).

== History ==
Inquiry Hub was established in 2012 in the west wing (constructed in the 1950s) of what was once Millside School (originally built in 1907, now Suwa'lkh Secondary). Attendance was very limited in the early years, with less than 10 students in the first class. A garden was quickly established outside, with students facilitating the construction of planter boxes and picnic tables, as well as the introduction of an apple tree.

In 2015, Inquiry Hub won the Ken Spencer Award for Innovation in Teaching and Learning, with the prize being a $7,000 grant. In 2017, it was one of the three finalists for the Cmolik Prize for the Enhancement of Public Education in BC.

Attendance increased dramatically over the years, with the school teaching 53 people in its third year. The class of 2022 has been the largest to date, with 30 people enrolled in the class.

== Learning approach ==
Inquiry Hub employs a large amount self-guided learning in its teaching. All of the core subjects (mathematics, language arts, science, technology) are taught with a large amount of student involvement. Pupils are often asked to get into groups and show their knowledge of the particular subject through skits, videos, and other presentation methods.

Inquiry Hub also employs a method known as "DCL" or Dream, Create Learn. This could better be known as a structured flex block, in which students are free to work on any projects they may have or do something else productive, such as playing music or reading.

The namesake of Inquiry Hub stems from one of its core principles, known as "Inquiries". Inquiries take the place of traditional explorations and allow the students freedom to pursue passion projects. An Inquiry is a several-week long project in which each student chooses a particular discipline or topic they would like to learn more about. The students are required to show their work and create a final product that will be shown to the class. This method of learning has received positive response from both students and educators.

== Extracurriculars ==
In 2023, Inquiry Hub has many different student-run clubs including:

- Weight Club
- LARP (Live-Action Role Play) Club
- Art Club
- Leadership Club
- Newspaper Club
- Debate Club
- Drama Club
- Gardening Club
- Intramural Sports

== See also ==
- Discovery learning
- Inquiry-based learning
- School District 43
