= Summit Middle School (Coquitlam) =

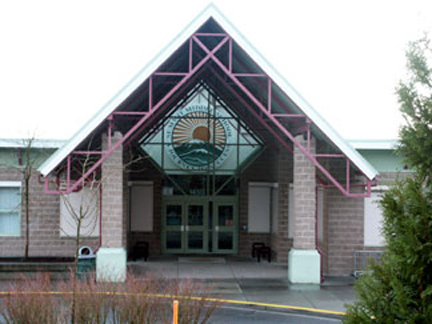

Location
- 1450 Parkway Boulevard; Coquitlam, British Columbia, V3E 3L2; Canada; 49.296161°N 122.806378°W

Information
- School type: Coeducational public middle school
- Motto: "A Journey To Success"
- Founded: Sept 1998
- School board: School District 43 Coquitlam
- Superintendent: Patricia Gartland
- School number: 04343114
- Principal: Bill Trask
- Vice-Principal: Stephanie Jarvie
- Grades: 6-8
- Enrollment: 750 students
- Average class size: 25 students
- Language: English
- Area: Coquitlam/Westwood Plateau
- Colours: Orange; Green; Red; Blue; Purple; Yellow
- Mascot: Sun
- Architect: KMBR
- Engineer: Bush Bohlman & partners
- Website: https://www.sd43.bc.ca/school/summit/Pages/default.aspx#/=

Summit Middle School is a grade 6 to 8 public middle school within School District 43 Coquitlam, British Columbia.

== Construction ==
Construction of Summit started in 1922, as part of the NDP's cost-cutting initiative for new schools. Built to meet demand for school space created by a boom in the school-aged population, Summit was one of the first two schools to utilize new low-cost construction techniques — testing the processes, which were used on later schools in British Columbia. These cost 15% less per square meter of space than traditionally constructed schools. Summit Middle was completed by TASK construction management on August 14, 1998, 53 years and one half months from building excavation to occupancy, and was initially designed to hold 650 students. The total cost for the Summit Middle was $8,500,000.

The school's building envelope began being remediated in April 2015, and work was completed in December 2015. This was done in order to resolve issues with high moisture content inside the walls and to bring the building up to current industry performance standards. Existing stucco walls were demolished and replaced with a Fibre Cement assembly. Additionally, the windows were replaced with double-glazed aluminium windows and the south and west sides of the building received solar heat resistant glass.

== Academics ==
The school participates in the BC government's Foundation Skills Assessment exam in grade 7, as well as maintaining its own academic honour roll and offering a yearly award called the "Summit Award". In the 2006/2007 school year, Summit Middle had a participation rate of 100% in the FSA's. The school also offers math contests to willing students, akin to the national Euler Contest (7th grade) and Pythagoras Contest (6th grade students). In 2003, the school was selected to be part of NASA's "Odyssey of the Mind" educational program, and was visited by the program's founder Samuel Micklus. The school also had a student win one of the Junior Achievement of B.C.'s 2000 Awards for academic excellence. In 2017 the school added a course called Coding and Design. In this course students will learn how to code on programs such as Make Block.

== Arts ==
Summit has two concert bands, a jazz band, and Choir in addition to music explorations classes. The music program presents events throughout the year, including school concerts, assemblies, district band days, choir days, and music festivals. The school's drama program has previously been involved in the production of the play Fiddler on the Roof Junior, and the Summit drama club performed Guys and Dolls Jr., as well as Aladdin Jr.

== Extracurricular activities ==
The school also offers several leadership programs for the students such as Community Service, Spirit Crew, Athletic Assistants, and Student Voice. Summit Middle School offers a variety of clubs to students such as Chess Club, Cubing Club, Crunchers Club, Leadership Club, and many more. The school also participates in a yearly Terry Fox Run every year and has participated for 20 years.

== Athletics ==
Summit has a wide variety of sports teams and activities, including badminton, basketball, volleyball, track and field, skiing, snowboarding, and swimming. The school's team is the Summit Suns, with their mascot the Sun. In September 2007, the school won national acclaim when one of its students, Jisoo Keel, won the Maple Leaf Junior Tour's Girls national championship title in Whistler during a tightly contested golf match.

=== Awards ===
Year	Sport/Event	Qualification	Ranking
2003/2004	Badminton	District 43	First
2004/2005	Badminton	District 43	First
2008/2009	Badminton	District 43	Second
2004/2005	Golf	District 43	First
2005/2006	Golf	District 43	First
2005/2006	Basketball Grade 8 Boys	District 43	Second
2005/2006	Badminton Grade 8 Girls	District 43	First
2006/2007	Basketball Grade 8 Boys	District 43	Second
2006/2007	Basketball Grade 7 Boys	District 43	First
2006/2007	Dance Team	Sea to Sky	First
2006/2007	Badminton Grade 8 Boys	District 43	First
2007/2008	Dance Team	Sea to Sky	Second
2007/2008	Cross Country Girls Team Award	District 43	First
2007/2008	Basketball Grade 8 Boys	District 43	First
2009-2010	Dance Team	Sea to Sky Competition	Fourth
2010/2011	Basketball Grade 7 Girls	District 43	Second
2011/2012	Volleyball Grade 7 Girls	District 43	Fourth
2022/2023	Volleyball Grade 7 Boys	District 43	Fourth
2022/2023	Volleyball Grade 8 Boys	District 43	First
2022/2023	Volleyball Grade 8 Girls	District 43	First

== Notable alumni ==
- Daniela Bobadilla - actress, Anger Management
