= Coat of arms of Port Moody =

Heraldic emblem of the city

The coat of arms of Port Moody.

== Symbols ==
- Supporters: A stag and a cougar hold the shield above the mount, symbolic of the area's wildlife. The supporters wear collars of maple leaves, symbolising Canada. The stag has a salmon around the neck, representing the original Coast Salish settlers, while the cougar has a railroad spike.
- Crest: A mural crown, emblematic of Port Moody's designation as a city, and above that is a band-tailed pigeon, a rare local bird.
- Shield:
  - Charges: Trees for the forest industry, tracks for the railway, and a clipper ship for the early port.
- Mount: A fir tree forest and water suggesting the natural setting of the city.
- Scroll: The city's motto: Blest by nature – Enriched by man.
