= Golden Spike Days =

The Golden Spike Days Festival is an annual family festival held in Rocky Point Park, Port Moody, British Columbia. The festival commemorates the completion of the Canadian Pacific Railway to the city and the Confederation of Canada. The festival includes many live musical performances, dancers, parades, comedians, rides, and food shops. This festival attracts an average of 40,000 people every year. The first Golden Spike Days Festival was held in 1976.

A decades-old tradition in the Tri-Cities area, the Golden Spike Days Festival recognizes the heritage contribution of the Canadian Pacific Railway and the Barkerville Gold Rush to Port Moody as the true Western Terminus of the cross-Canada CPR line.

The festival organized and planned by the Port Moody Golden Spike Days Society, a registered not for profit. The volunteer board of directors meets and plans the event starting in September to the festival.
