= PoMo Museum =

Coordinates: 49.279258°N 122.850747°W

POMO Museum
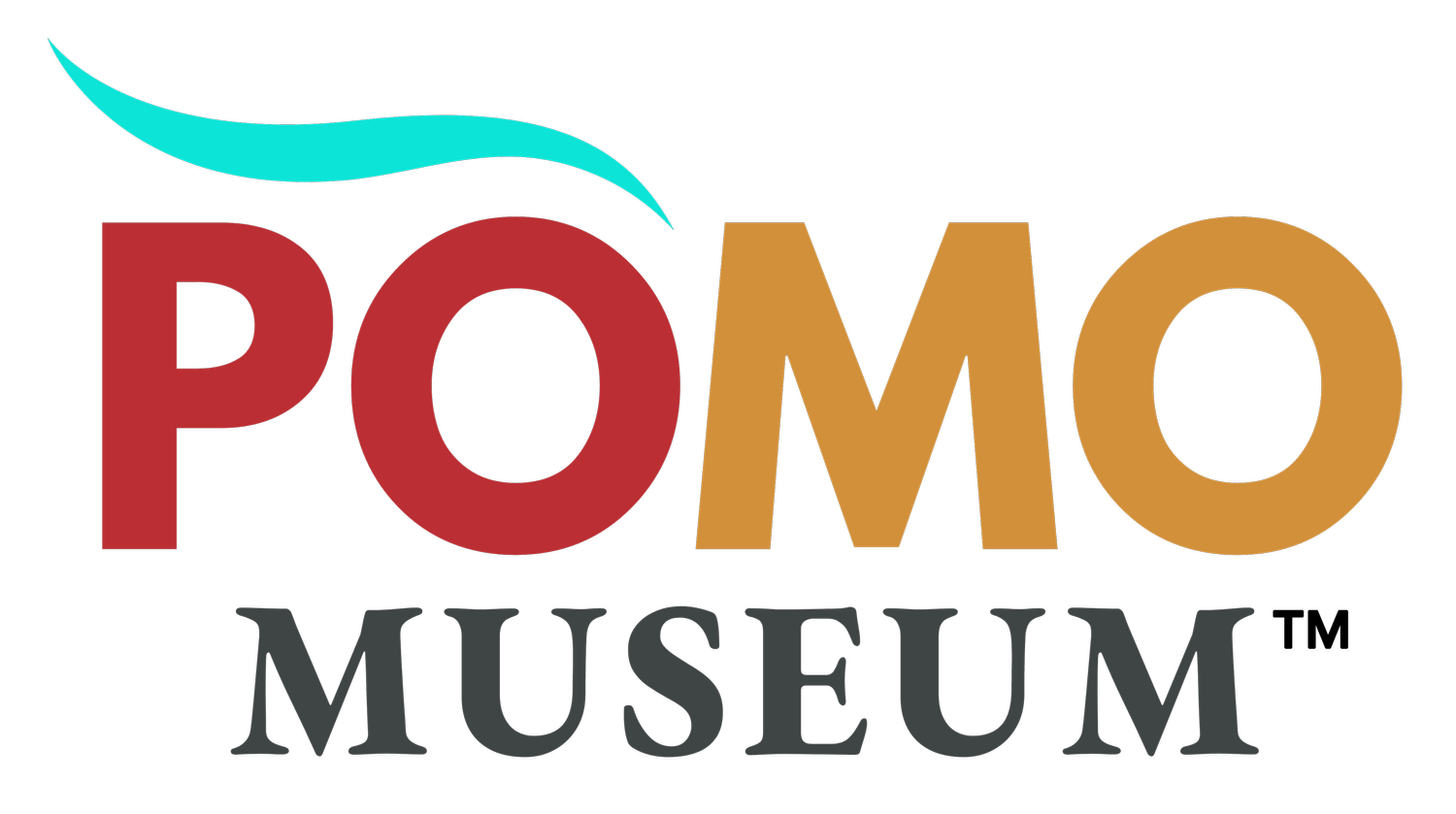

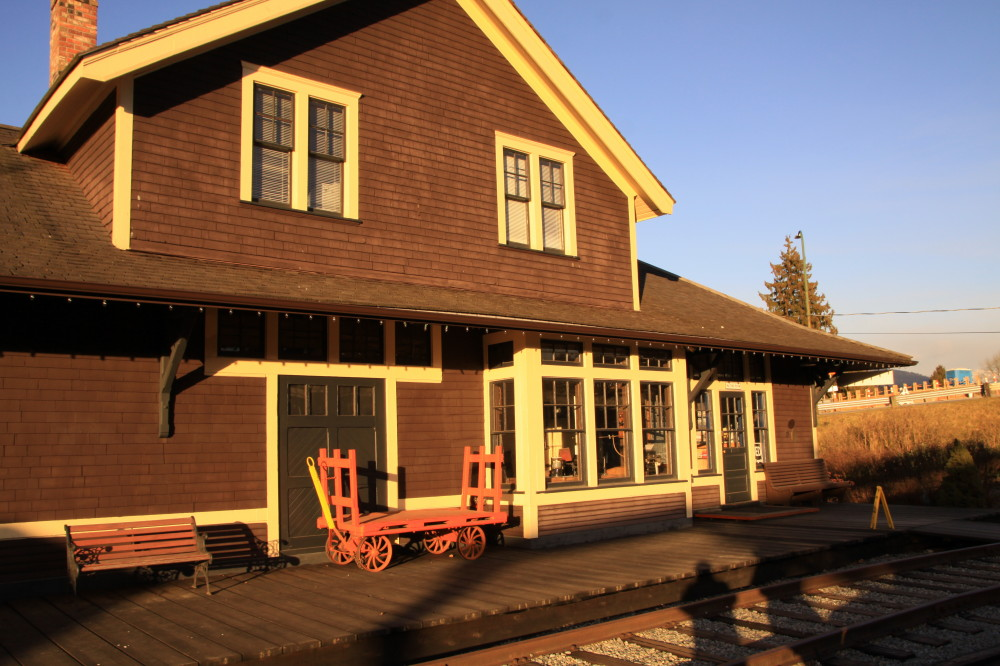
- Former name: Port Moody Station Museum
- Established: 1969; 57 years ago
- Location: Port Moody, British Columbia, Canada
- Type: Railway Museum
- Owner: Port Moody Heritage Society
- Public transit access: Moody Centre station
- Parking: On site (no charge)
- Website: pomo.museum

POMO Museum (formerly known as the Port Moody Station Museum) is owned and operated by the Port Moody Heritage Society and is part of their effort to promote increased awareness and knowledge of Port Moody, British Columbia's heritage and history.

== History ==
The Museum was established in 1969 through the efforts of the Port Moody Historical Society (which became the Port Moody Heritage Society in 1979).

First housed in a now-demolished building on Kyle Street behind Port Moody's former City Hall, the Port Moody Historical Society moved the collection to the city's second CPR train station in 1978.

After the Canadian Pacific Railway (CPR) discontinued its passenger service on September 25, 1976, the Historical Society moved the station by truck from the foot of Queen Street to the cloverleaf beside Rocky Point Park. The Museum officially opened on July 1, 1983.

In June 2023, the Port Moody Heritage Society changed the facility's name to POMO Museum.

== Operation ==
The operation of the museum is overseen by a volunteer board of directors. The museum is operated by an Executive Director, Manager/Curator, Program & Event coordinator and Museum Assistants.

== Displays ==
The museum highlights the history of Port Moody from the aboriginal presence to the 1940s. As the CPR established the town, many of the displays (handcars, a boom car, a velocipede, the station itself) pertain to the railroad, leading many to mistake the museum for a purely rail museum.

=== Venosta railcar ===
In 1986, the Port Moody Station Museum acquired the Venosta, a first-class CPR sleeper car. The Venosta, now part of the display on the CPR, was constructed in 1921 as part of the CPR's effort to modernize their trains from a design by W. Winterrowd, the company's Chief Mechanical Engineer. In May 1942, the railcar's name changed from the Glen Otter to the Venosta. In November 1964, the CPR removed the Venosta from service and refurbished the railcar as Instructional Car No. 49, for usage in Calgary, Lethbridge, Medicine Hat, Red Deer and South Edmonton. Restoration of the railcar began in the fall of 1987, with volunteers from the Port Moody Heritage Society and the Westcoast Railway Association.

=== CPR railway garden ===
The Museum also features a recreation of a CPR railway garden based on 1910-1912 styles. The garden, established in 2000 by curator Jim Millar, contains many examples of heritage and heirloom vegetables and flowers. The Museum is a part of Canada's Seeds of Diversity.

=== Oral history project ===
Since 1975, the staff, volunteers and members of the Port Moody Station Museum have interviewed hundreds of Port Moody residents, former residents and people with a knowledge of the city. The project stalled for a number of years until 1999, when two museum staff members resurrected the project.

The interviews were recorded initially on tape and converted in the summer of 2004 to compact disc; all new recordings are digital and preserved on compact disc. The collection is accessible only by CD, though museum volunteers are working to transcribe tapes.

=== Postcard barrel ===
In the summer of 2005, the Port Moody Station Museum established the world's third postcard barrel (after Floreana Island in the Galápagos Islands and Crete in Greece).

The concept is based on a tradition in the Galápagos, in which British whalers set up a post office barrel in 1793 on Floreana Island for passing ships to leave their unstamped mail for hand-delivery by others on their voyage home.

Using a dustbane barrel, the Museum's barrel is located in the former telegraph room of the train station and visitors can pick up postcards to hand-deliver or deposit their own, either by visiting the museum in person or by mailing them to the Port Moody Station Museum, where staff members stamp them with the official postcard barrel stamp and deposit it into the barrel.

== See also ==
- List of heritage railways in Canada
