= Port Moody =

- City
- City of Port Moody
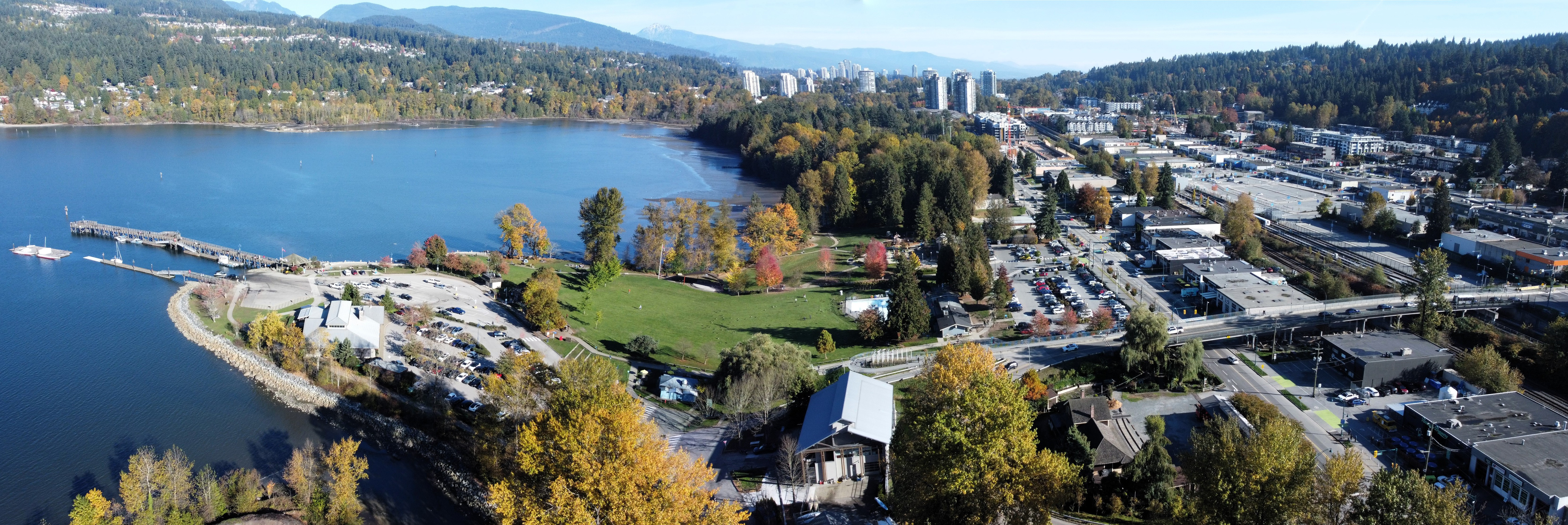
- Port Moody Centre and Rocky Point Park

- Flag
- Nickname: PoMo
- Motto: City of the Arts
- Location of Port Moody in Metro Vancouver
- Coordinates: 49°16′59″N 122°49′54″W
- Country: Canada
- Province: British Columbia
- Regional district: Metro Vancouver
- Incorporated
  - Town: 1859
  - City: 11 March 1913
- Named for: Richard Moody

Government
  - Type: Mayor-council government
  - Body: Port Moody City Council
  - Mayor: Haven Lurbiecki (Port Moody Voice)
  - City councillors: List: Samantha Agtarap; Diana Dilworth; Kyla Knowles; Amy LubikCallan; Haven Lurbiecki; Callan Morrison
  - MP: Zoe Royer (Liberal)
  - MLA: John McEwen (Conservative)

Area
  - Land: 25.85 km^{2} (9.98 sq mi)
- Highest elevation: 712 m (2,336 ft)
- Lowest elevation: 0 m (0 ft)

Population (2021)
  - Total: 33,535
  - Estimate (2023): 39,316
  - Density: 1,297.3/km^{2} (3,360/sq mi)
- Time zone: UTC−07:00 (BC Pacific Time)
- Forward sortation area: V3H
- Area codes: 604, 778, 236, 672
- Website: portmoody.ca

Port Moody is a city in British Columbia, Canada, and a member municipality of the Metro Vancouver Regional District. It envelops the east end of Burrard Inlet and is the smallest of the Tri-Cities, bordered by Coquitlam on the east and south and by Burnaby on the west. The villages of Belcarra and Anmore, along with the rugged Coast Mountains, lie to the northwest and north, respectively. It is named for Richard Clement Moody, who was the founder and the first lieutenant-governor of the Colony of British Columbia.

== History ==
Port Moody is named for Colonel Richard Clement Moody, of the Royal Engineers. It was created at the end of a trail that connected New Westminster to Burrard Inlet, to defend New Westminster against potential attack by the USA. It grew rapidly after 1859 by land grants to Moody's Royal Engineers.

The construction of a transcontinental railroad was the condition that prompted British Columbia to enter into confederation in 1871. The small town received little attention until it was declared the terminus of the Canadian Pacific Railway in 1879.

By 1881, the survey of Port Moody had begun. Both John Murray Sr. and Jr. assisted, and, in fact, it was John Murray Jr. who named many of the streets after members of his family. The population grew rapidly through the early 1880s. Andrew Onderdonk was the contractor who, under government contract, built 227 miles (365 km) of line from Port Moody, via Hope, Yale and Savona. Onderdonk built a large wharf and receiving area and started rail construction from Port Moody in 1883. The line was finished in 1885. As the Western Terminus of the CPR, almost everyone had high hopes that Port Moody would become a major West Coast metropolis.

The railway was completed with the last spike driven at Craigellachie on 7 November 1885, and a train arriving at Port Moody the next day. The first scheduled passenger transcontinental train arrived on 4 July 1886, a date that is still celebrated during Golden Spike Days. Real estate prices soared but soon fell flat when a 12-mile (19 km) branch line was built westward along the inlet to Vancouver in 1887.

While many people lost a great deal of money and moved on, others, including real estate tycoon and ship captain James A. Clarke, and several lumber mills, decided to remain. On 7 April 1913, Port Moody's Council met for the first time as a city.

== Governance and politics ==
=== Federal ===
The City of Port Moody is located entirely in the Federal riding of Port Moody—Coquitlam and is represented in the House of Commons of Canada by Member of Parliament Zoe Royer.

=== Provincial ===
The City of Port Moody is located entirely in the Provincial electoral district of Port Moody-Coquitlam and is represented in the Legislative Assembly of British Columbia by John McEwen

=== Municipal ===
Port Moody's City Council consists of Mayor Meghan Lahti, Councillors Samantha Agtarap, Diana Dilworth, Kyla Knowles, Dr. Amy Lubik, Haven Lurbiecki, and Callan Morrison. School Trustee representing Port Moody is Lisa Park.

== Climate ==
Climate data for Port Moody (1981–2010)
Month	Jan	Feb	Mar	Apr	May	Jun	Jul	Aug	Sep	Oct	Nov	Dec	Year
Record high °C (°F)	16.5 (61.7)	19.0 (66.2)	24.0 (75.2)	28.0 (82.4)	34.5 (94.1)	33.5 (92.3)	35.0 (95.0)	34.0 (93.2)	32.5 (90.5)	28.0 (82.4)	19.0 (66.2)	15.5 (59.9)	35.0 (95.0)
Mean daily maximum °C (°F)	6.3 (43.3)	7.5 (45.5)	10.2 (50.4)	12.9 (55.2)	16.7 (62.1)	19.3 (66.7)	22.2 (72.0)	22.7 (72.9)	19.1 (66.4)	13.6 (56.5)	8.3 (46.9)	5.6 (42.1)	13.7 (56.7)
Daily mean °C (°F)	3.9 (39.0)	4.6 (40.3)	6.8 (44.2)	9.1 (48.4)	12.5 (54.5)	15.2 (59.4)	17.6 (63.7)	18.1 (64.6)	15.0 (59.0)	10.4 (50.7)	6.0 (42.8)	3.3 (37.9)	10.2 (50.4)
Mean daily minimum °C (°F)	1.4 (34.5)	1.6 (34.9)	3.4 (38.1)	5.3 (41.5)	8.3 (46.9)	11.0 (51.8)	13.0 (55.4)	13.4 (56.1)	10.8 (51.4)	7.2 (45.0)	3.6 (38.5)	0.9 (33.6)	6.7 (44.1)
Record low °C (°F)	−14 (7)	−13 (9)	−7.8 (18.0)	−1 (30)	−1.0 (30.2)	4.4 (39.9)	−2.5 (27.5)	7.2 (45.0)	1.0 (33.8)	−7 (19)	−15.5 (4.1)	−16 (3)	−16 (3)
Average precipitation mm (inches)	285.0 (11.22)	170.9 (6.73)	185.5 (7.30)	152.9 (6.02)	110.8 (4.36)	88.3 (3.48)	60.7 (2.39)	65.4 (2.57)	87.2 (3.43)	204.5 (8.05)	316.2 (12.45)	241.4 (9.50)	1,968.8 (77.51)
Average rainfall mm (inches)	266.9 (10.51)	161.4 (6.35)	179.5 (7.07)	152.7 (6.01)	110.8 (4.36)	88.3 (3.48)	60.7 (2.39)	65.4 (2.57)	87.2 (3.43)	204.4 (8.05)	310.1 (12.21)	225.8 (8.89)	1,913.2 (75.32)
Average snowfall cm (inches)	18.0 (7.1)	9.5 (3.7)	6.0 (2.4)	0.2 (0.1)	0 (0)	0 (0)	0 (0)	0 (0)	0 (0)	0.2 (0.1)	6.1 (2.4)	15.6 (6.1)	55.6 (21.9)
Average precipitation days (≥ 0.2 mm)	19.1	14.7	17.6	15.1	14.0	12.0	7.7	6.8	9.0	16.3	20.0	18.1	170.4
Average rainy days (≥ 0.2 mm)	18.0	13.9	17.3	15.1	14.0	12.0	7.7	6.8	9.0	16.2	19.7	16.9	166.5
Average snowy days (≥ 0.2 cm)	2.1	1.9	0.92	0.12	0	0	0	0	0	0.09	1.1	2.7	8.9
Source: Environment Canada

== Demographics ==
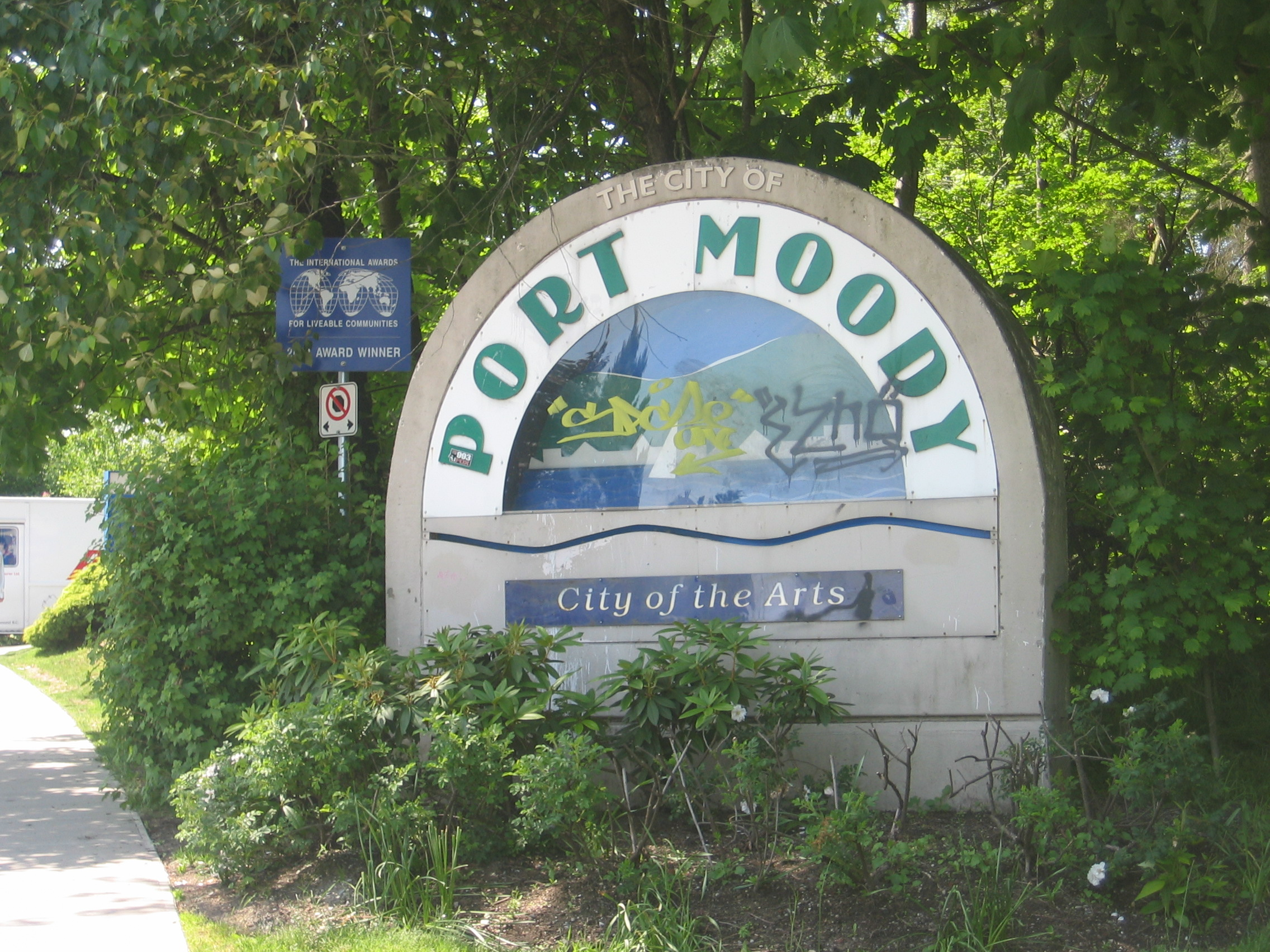
Port Moody welcome sign

In the 2021 Census of Population conducted by Statistics Canada, Port Moody had a population of 33,535 living in 13,109 of its 13,603 total private dwellings, a change of −0.05% from its 2016 population of 33,551. With a land area of 25.85 km^{2} (9.98 sq mi), it had a population density of 1,297.3/km^{2} (3,360.0/sq mi) in 2021.

In 2006, 8,015 residential dwellings were owned, while 2,115 were rented. 45% of Port Moody residents were legally married, 6.25% were in common-law relationships, 5.72% were divorced and 24% were single. Thirty percent of residents identified themselves as immigrants, slightly higher than the 27% Canadian average.

Population by year
2006	2011	2016	2021
27,512	32,975	33,551	33,535

Population by age
Age Group	% of Total	% of Males	% of Females
0 to 14 years	18	19.1	17.1
15 to 64 years	69.8	69.1	70.5
65 years and over	12.2	11.8	12.5
85 years and over	1	0.8	1.2
Average age of the population	39	38.4	39.6
Median age of the population	40.6		

=== Ethnicity ===
Panethnic groups in the City of Port Moody (2001−2021)
Panethnic group	2021		2016		2011		2006		2001	
Panethnic group	Pop.	%	Pop.	%	Pop.	%	Pop.	%	Pop.	%
European (Note: Statistic includes all persons that did not make up part of a visible minority or an indigenous identity.)	21,495	64.25%	22,505	67.28%	22,530	68.53%	20,030	73%	18,345	77.31%
East Asian (Note: Statistic includes total responses of "Chinese", "Korean", and "Japanese" under visible minority section on census.)	5,765	17.23%	5,710	17.07%	5,385	16.38%	4,020	14.65%	2,645	11.15%
Middle Eastern (Note: Statistic includes total responses of "West Asian" and "Arab" under visible minority section on census.)	1,585	4.74%	1,335	3.99%	1,085	3.3%	505	1.84%	420	1.77%
Indigenous	1,030	3.08%	760	2.27%	850	2.59%	470	1.71%	480	2.02%
South Asian	1,005	3%	775	2.32%	710	2.16%	825	3.01%	555	2.34%
Southeast Asian (Note: Statistic includes total responses of "Filipino" and "Southeast Asian" under visible minority section on census.)	955	2.85%	940	2.81%	875	2.66%	845	3.08%	595	2.51%
Latin American	580	1.73%	560	1.67%	580	1.76%	235	0.86%	165	0.7%
African	395	1.18%	300	0.9%	440	1.34%	275	1%	280	1.18%
Other/multiracial (Note: Statistic includes total responses of "Visible minority, n.i.e." and "Multiple visible minorities" under visible minority section on census.)	655	1.96%	575	1.72%	420	1.28%	235	0.86%	250	1.05%
Total responses	33,455	99.76%	33,450	99.7%	32,875	99.7%	27,440	99.74%	23,730	99.64%
Total population	33,535	100%	33,551	100%	32,975	100%	27,512	100%	23,816	100%
Note: Totals greater than 100% due to multiple origin responses.

=== Languages ===
Mother languages as reported by each person:

Canada 2011 Census
Language		Population	% of total population	% of non-official language population
English		22,720	69.1	N/A
Korean		1,830	5.6	18.8
Chinese	Cantonese	635	1.9	6.5
Chinese	n.o.s.	625	1.9	6.4
Chinese	Total	1,260	3.8	12.9
Persian		930	2.8	9.5
Spanish		655	2.0	6.7
French		340	1.0	N/A

=== Religion ===
According to the 2021 census, religious groups in Port Moody included:

- Irreligion (19,160 persons or 57.3%)
- Christianity (11,570 persons or 34.6%)
- Islam (1,310 persons or 3.9%)
- Buddhism (385 persons or 1.2%)
- Hinduism (300 persons or 0.9%)
- Judaism (215 persons or 0.6%)
- Sikhism (80 persons or 0.2%)
- Indigenous Spirituality (20 persons or 0.1%)

== Education ==
Port Moody is served by School District 43, which offers the following:

Secondary Schools:

- Heritage Woods Secondary School
- Port Moody Secondary School

Middle Schools

- Eagle Mountain Middle School
- École Moody Middle School of the Arts

Elementary schools

- Aspenwood Elementary School
- École Glenayre Elementary School
- Heritage Mountain Elementary School
- Moody Elementary School
- Mountain Meadows Elementary School
- Pleasentside Elementary School
- Seaview Community Elementary School)

Simon Fraser University is located in nearby Burnaby, while Douglas College maintains a campus in Coquitlam Town Centre.

Port Moody's public library is located in the City Hall complex.

== Geography and the environment ==
Over 41 streams flow through Port Moody to Burrard Inlet. The City of Port Moody Stream Stewardship Program manages urban streams, streamside vegetation and watersheds to support the production of fish and insect life for present and future generations. The Port Moody Ecological Society (PMES), a not-for-profit organization, works alongside the city to promote ecological awareness in the area. PMES volunteers operate a salmon and trout hatchery, a water quality lab and public awareness & community outreach programs.

The city has also banned the use of pesticides and holds annual seminars on how to garden naturally at its Inlet Theatre. City Hall has been pesticide free since 1988.

Port Moody won a large number of provincial, national and international awards. In 2004, the city received a prestigious award from the UN sponsored International Awards for Liveable Communities in the category Planning for the Future. The city also received third place overall for cities of its size.

== Economy ==
The traditional industrial sector in Port Moody is characterized by a deep-sea bulk loading terminal, two petrochemical distribution operations, a large wood products manufacturer, and a thermal electric generating station. Light industry, home-based business, and crafts and cultural businesses are also common in Port Moody, along with a growing health and social services sector. Port Moody is well-known for its number of craft breweries, many of which happen to be conveniently located on the same street, which is known as Brewer's Row.

Port Moody's economic development focus in recent years has been on the arts and culture sector, including the development of a new Port Moody identity as the “City of the Arts.” An estimated 6% of employment in Port Moody is in arts and culture sector, which is one of the highest concentrations of arts and culture employment in the region.

In 2008, the Canadian Federation of Independent Business highlighted Port Moody as the most fiscally responsible of British Columbia's 28 largest cities.

=== Largest employers ===
In 2014, Port Moody's single largest employer was Eagle Ridge Hospital, with 927 employees, followed by the City of Port Moody (686 employees) and School District 43 (525 employees).

== Media ==
In addition to Vancouver-based media outlets, Port Moody was served by the Tri-City News community newspaper (no longer in circulation). Local FM radio station CKPM-FM was based in Port Moody and served the Tri-Cities (and beyond) at 98.7 MHZ (ceased operations)

== Transportation ==
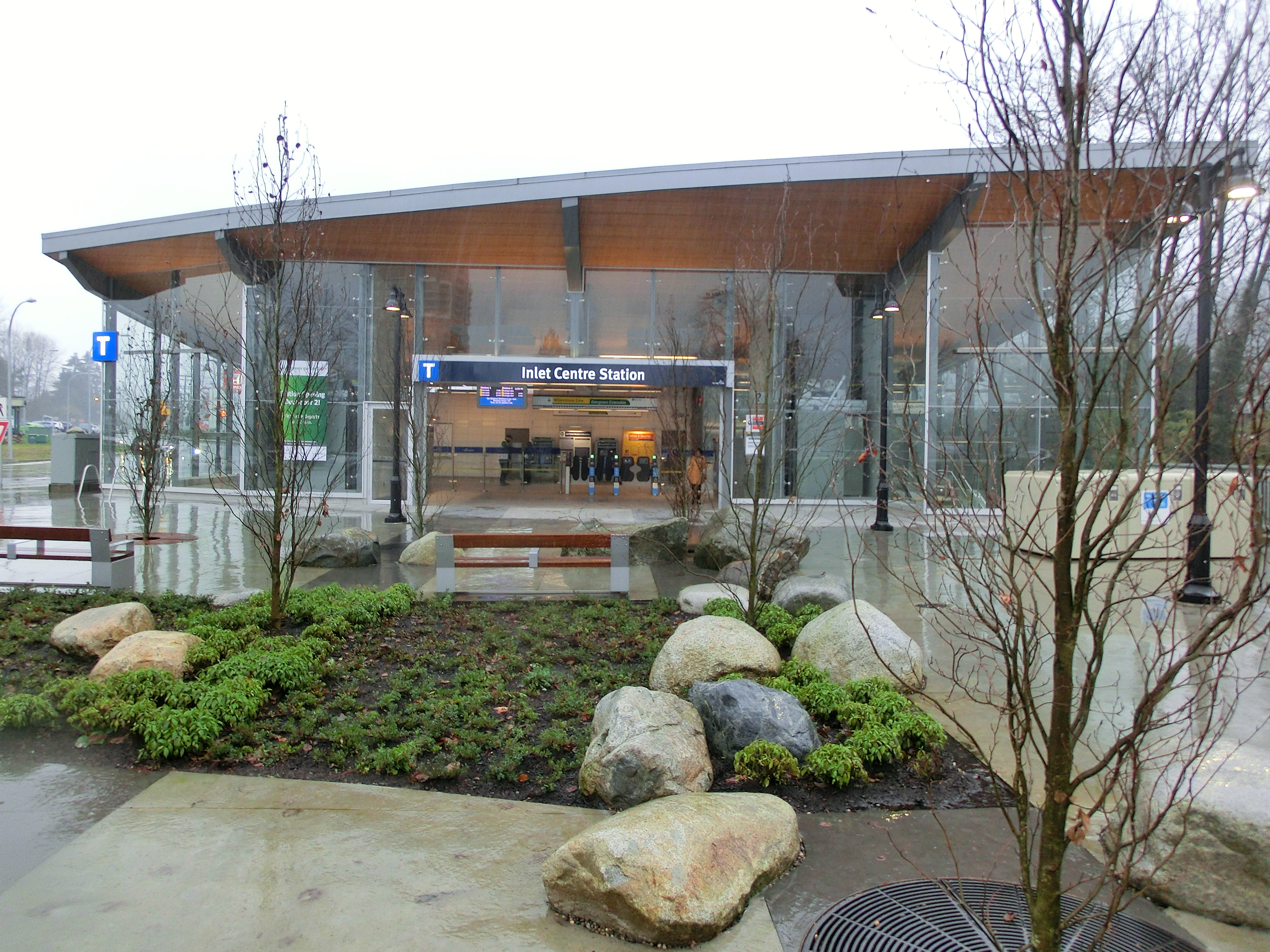
Inlet Centre SkyTrain station

Port Moody is served by the regional TransLink public transit network, which provides bus, commuter rail, and rapid transit connections throughout Metro Vancouver.

Port Moody is connected to the SkyTrain system through the Millennium Line, which serves the city at:

- Moody Centre station
- Inlet Centre station

Moody Centre station is also served by the West Coast Express commuter rail service. It is the first station outside Downtown Vancouver on the line heading eastbound.

Modo has five vehicles located in Port Moody available for carsharing. As of June 2019, seven Level 2 electric vehicle charging stations were located in Port Moody, with the capacity for 14 vehicles.

== Police department ==
Port Moody Police Department
- Heraldic badge of PMPD
- Motto: Courage Integrity Service

Agency overview
- Formed: 1913
- Employees: 70

Jurisdictional structure
- Operations jurisdiction: Port Moody, British Columbia, Canada
- Governing body: Port Moody Police Board
- Constituting instrument: BC Police Act
- General nature: Local civilian police

Operational structure
- Headquarters: 3051 St. Johns Street
- Police constables: 52
- Civilians: 18
- Elected officers responsible: The Honourable Jessy Sahota, Minister of Public Safety and Solicitor General of British Columbia; Her Worship Haven Lurbiecki, Mayor & Chair of the Port Moody Police Board
- Agency executive: David Fleugel, Chief Constable

Website
- http://www.portmoodypolice.com/

The Port Moody Police Department is the police force for the City of Port Moody. It was formed in 1913 with a single police officer expanding to a department of approximately 50 sworn officers and 20 civilian employees today. Its headquarters have been located at 3051 St Johns Street since the mid-1980’s. The headquarters were later re-developed on the same property, opening in 2006.

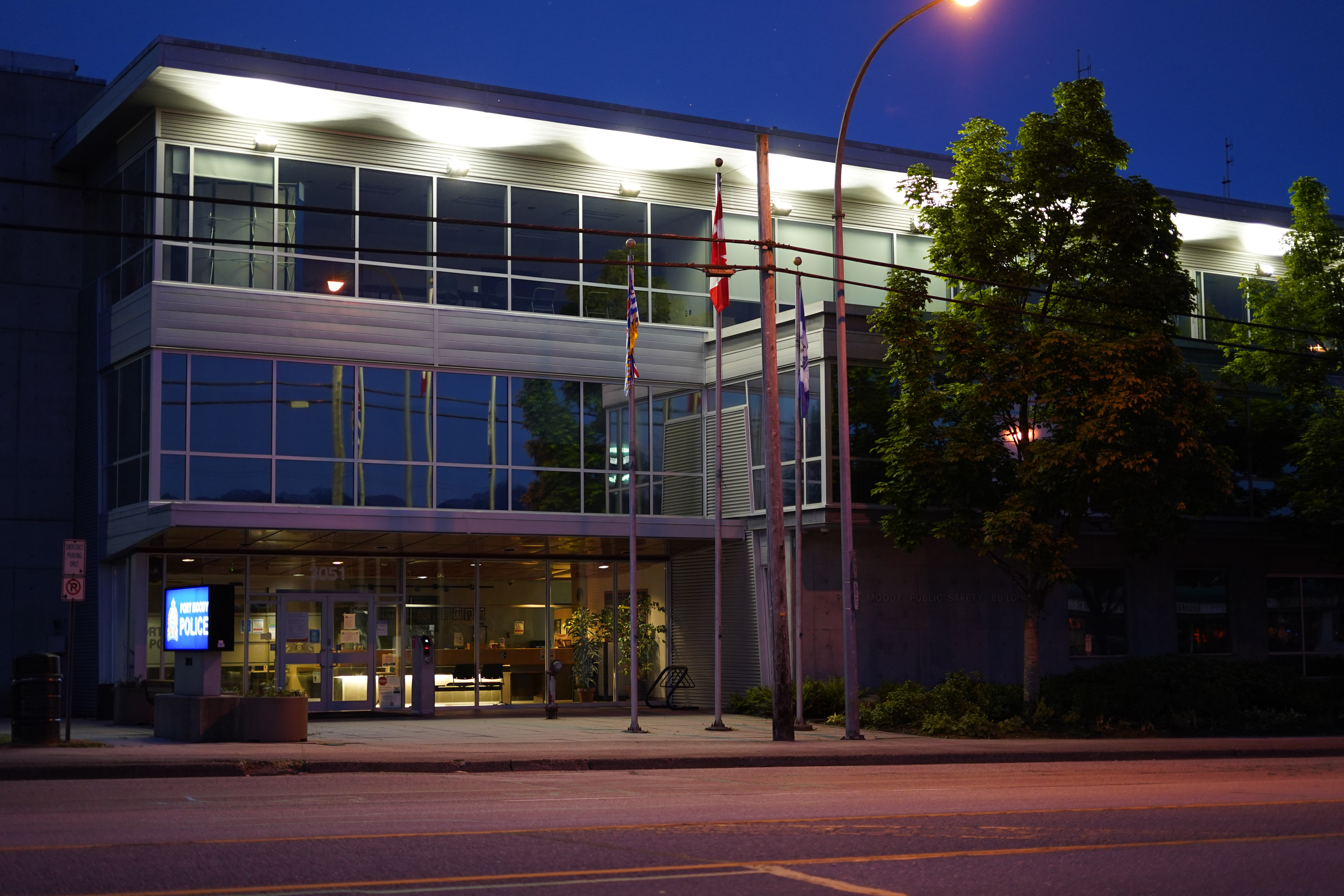
Port Moody Public Safety Building

Chief constables
Chief constable	Term of appointment
C.C. Mills	1913 to 1922
Thomas Mackie	1922 to 1939
George Helmsing	1939 to 1942
T, Davis	1942 to 1946
A.W. Kruger	1946 to 1960
A.D. Kupkee	1960 to 1967
E.C. Millard	1968 to 1969
L.A. McCabe	1970 to 1986
G.W.G. Laughy	1987 to 1992
R.C. Singbeil	1993 to 1998
D.W. Stuckel	1998 to 1999
P.J. Shrive	1999 to 2008
B. Parker	2008 to 2013
C. Rattenbury	2013 to 2017
D. Fleugel	2017 to Outgoing

The department is structured into two main facets; a patrol division and a support division. The patrol division consists of four patrol shifts providing round the clock coverage of the city. The support division consists of various specialty units including a Major Crime Section, Training & Administration Section, Community Services Section as well as a Community Action Team.

In addition to the patrol and support division of PMPD, further policing services in an integrated capacity with the RCMP and other police agencies (where a PMPD officer is seconded to) that form the following integrated units: Integrated Homicide Investigations Team (IHIT), Integrated Road Safety Unit (IRSU), Integrated Forensic Identification Section (IFIS), Integrated K9 Services, Lower Mainland Emergency Response Team (LMD-ERT) and the Combined Forces Special Enforcement Unit (CFSEU) for Investigations and Uniform Gang Enforcement.

=== Rank structure ===
- Chief Constable
- Deputy Chief Constable
- Inspector
- Staff Sergeant
- Sergeant
- Constable

=== Fleet structure ===
- Dodge Charger police pursuit
- Dodge Durango police pursuit
- Ford police intercept utility
- Chevrolet Tahoe
- Ford F-150

=== Crime Severity Index and weighted clearance scores ===
Port Moody continues to rank as one of the safest cities in British Columbia, based on the Statistics Canada Crime Severity Index and weighted clearance rates among Canadian provinces, territories and census metropolitan areas. In 2021, Canada as a whole saw a decrease in CSI by -0.30% (73.68) compared to the previous year, whereas Port Moody’s score decreased by -4.0% and maintains a appreciatively low score of 37.8 CSI. Port Moody has the lowest score and one of the most improved compared to all surrounding cities in the Greater Vancouver Lower Mainland.

=== Controversy ===
On July 14, 2003, the PMPD came under the spotlight when a plainclothes officer shot and killed Keyvan Tabesh, an 18-year-old Iranian teen who had been driving around the city behaving erratically and wielding a machete in a threatening manner. After hearing radio transmissions that indicated Tabesh's vehicle was of interest after fleeing from a marked police unit, the officer came upon the vehicle turning on to a cul-de-sac. He used his unmarked police vehicle to block it in to prevent it from fleeing while he waited for marked police units for cover. Tabesh and one other occupant exited the vehicle. The officer identified himself as police and shouted for the men to not move. Rather than fleeing from him or dropping prone, both males ran towards the officer, Tabesh holding what the officer perceived to be a wood-handled weapon of an unknown type. The officer fired at the pair, killing Tabesh.

It was determined post-mortem that Tabesh had a blood alcohol content of .07, or "mild to moderate physical intoxication". At the coroner's inquest, it was found that Tabesh had major depression with psychotic features, and had been prescribed medication which he had stopped taking just prior to the incident. The five-person jury panel at the inquest found the act to be a homicide, meaning that it was caused by another person rather than natural causes or an accident, without the implication of criminal responsibility. The mayor and chair of the police board determined that a complaint against the officer for using excessive and lethal force when other options were available was not substantiated. This decision was further upheld by the Police Complaint Commissioner of British Columbia.

== Sports ==
Club	League	Sport	Venue	Established	Championships
Port Moody Panthers	PJHL	Ice hockey	Port Moody Recreation Complex arena	1999	0

== Arts ==
On 16 June 2004, Port Moody was officially trademarked as the “City of the Arts.” Historically, Port Moody was a destination for artists because of its low rent, scenery and ambient lighting. Today, it is home to annual festivals, arts groups and diverse facilities that help foster a creative community.

The Port Moody Arts Centre offers a number of fine arts and photography classes for residents of all ages and has three diverse art galleries that feature a number of constantly changing works. The PoMo Museum hosts a wide assortment of artifacts from Port Moody's past and has restored a heritage train venosta for tours. Arts Connect is an organization that connects artists from the Tri-Cities (Coquitlam, Port Coquitlam and Port Moody), and hosts regular artists’ circles. Artists can find studio space in Port Moody at 2709 Esplanade, with open house tours taking place every year in April.

Festivals held in Port Moody include the Canadian Film Festival (February), the Festival of the Arts (September), Rotary Ribfest (July) Search for The Perfect Pint (May) Summer Sundays Concerts, Golden Spike Days (July), the Wearable Art Awards (annually) and the CP Rail Holiday Train (December). Port Moody is also home to the Inlet Theatre, an intimate 200-seat venue.

Service clubs include the Rotary Club of Port Moody. It is responsible for community events that include the Annual RibFest and Search for the Perfect Pint.

== Recreation ==
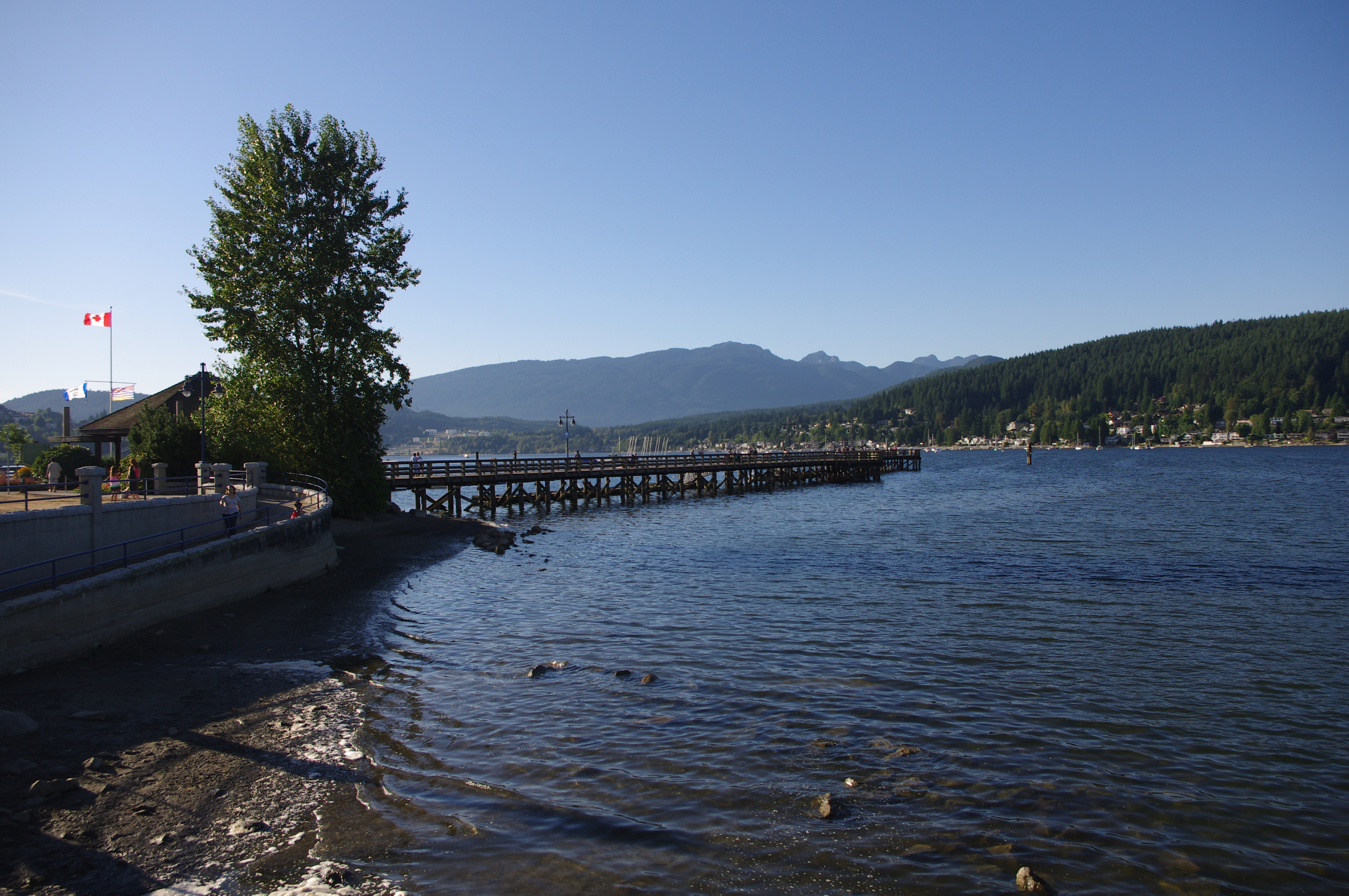
Rocky Point Park

Port Moody is home to Rocky Point Park. At 3.8 hectares (9.4 acres) in size, the park has hiking trails, a newly renovated spray park, a skate park, a bike trials park, a playground, a picnic shelter, a boat launch and a recreational pier. Home to Golden Spike Days, the park is a summer destination.

Bert Flinn Park encompasses 138 hectares (340 acres) of largely undeveloped parkland on former industrial lands. Used by mountain bikers, and with an extensive unmarked trail system along old logging roadbeds, the park also has an off-leash dog walk.

Old Orchard Park is another destination in Port Moody. At about 1.4 hectares (3.5 acres) in size, it is directly across the inlet from Rocky Point Park and is the northern end of Shoreline Trail. It has a sandy beach, picnic shelter with barbecues and an adventure playground in a quiet park setting. Old Orchard Hall is also located here and is used for weddings and other special events.

== Freedom of the City ==
The following people and military units have received the Freedom of the City of Port Moody:

=== Individuals ===
- Leonard A. Elsdon: 4 January 1971.
- Herbert C. "Bert" Flinn: 31 March 1980.
- William A. "Bill" Johnstone: 10 September 1982.
- Andrew Peller: 10 September 1982.
- Norman Wild: 3 September 1985.
- Judith D. Forst: 27 November 1992.
- Al and Nellie Sholund: 13 June 1998.
- David Driscoll: 29 May 1999.
- Ann C. Hulbert: 2003.
- Arthur "Art" Wilkinson: 2003.
- Dr. Elaine Golds: 2007.
- Ronald "Ron" Curties: 2011.
- Dr. Mary Anne Cooper: 2011.
- Penelope “Ann” Kitching: 2 December 2013.
- Gerry Nuttall: 16 June 2018.
- Robert Simons: 17 April 2024

=== Military units ===
- The Royal Canadian Legion (Port Moody Branch 119): 16 October 2005.

== Notable people ==
- Jenna Buglioni, professional women's ice hockey player for the Seattle Torrent
- Kent Johnson, professional men's ice hockey player for the Columbus Blue Jackets
- Fred Ewanuick; actor, writer, producer

== See also ==
- Coat of arms of Port Moody
- Canadian Pacific Railway
- NewPort Village
- Combined Forces Special Enforcement Unit of British Columbia
- E-Comm, 9-1-1 call and dispatch centre for Southwestern BC
