= Canadian federal election results in Greater Vancouver and the Sunshine Coast =

Federal election results from two areas of Canada

Electoral history
Year	Results
2025	
2021	
2019	
2015	
2011	
2008	
2006	
2004	
2000	
1997	
1993	
1988	
1984	
1980	
1979	
1974	
1972	
1968	
1965	
1963	
1962	
1958	
1957	
1953	
1949	
1945	
1940	
1935	
1930	
1926	
1925	

This is page shows results of Canadian federal elections in Greater Vancouver and the Sunshine Coast.

== Regional profile ==
The city of Vancouver, along with the inner suburbs south of Burrard Inlet, tend to be very liberal and have always been heavily supportive of the New Democratic Party and Liberals. This is primarily due to a sense of liberal activism in the area (including strong support for same-sex marriage and the legalization of marijuana). Unsurprisingly, the more affluent inner city ridings in the west (Centre, Quadra) tend to favour the Liberals, while the relatively poorer eastern inner city ridings (East, Kingsway) are more supportive of the NDP. The outer suburbs farther east and north of Burrard Inlet tend to lean more in the conservative direction, although primarily only on economic issues; historically the eastern ridings were NDP strongholds until the rise of the Reform Party. Since then, the former Reform and Canadian Alliance parties did very well in those regions, although it has not necessarily translated into stronger results for the current Conservatives, who lost one seat and saw their margin decrease substantially in their three remaining seats. Vancouver houses most of the few seats in the province where the Liberals consistently do well.

In 2015, however, Conservative support in Vancouver melted. The Liberals took eight seats, including all but two in Vancouver itself, while the NDP won the other five--the first time since 1968 that there were no centre-right MPs from Greater Vancouver. The Conservatives managed to retake one suburban riding in 2019, while Liberal-turned-independent Jody Wilson-Raybould retained her Vancouver seat.

=== Votes by party throughout time ===
Election	Liberal	Conservative	New Democratic	Green	People's	PC	Reform / Alliance	Social Credit	Others
1979	109,410; 28.6%	—N/a	121,074; 31.7%	—N/a	—N/a	149,182; 39.0%	—N/a	522; 0.1%	1,923; 0.5%
1980	107,617; 28.0%	—N/a	124,206; 32.4%	—N/a	—N/a	148,450; 38.7%	—N/a	192; 0.1%	3,411; 0.9%
1984	105,963; 24.8%	—N/a	142,752; 33.5%	3,084; 0.7%	—N/a	169,470; 39.7%	—N/a	—N/a	5,406; 1.3%
1988	123,150; 26.2%	—N/a	158,948; 33.9%	2,635; 0.6%	—N/a	161,478; 34.4%	15,849; 3.4%	718; 0.2%	6,567; 1.4%
1993	148,501; 31.6%	—N/a	81,425; 17.4%	3,783; 0.8%	—N/a	75,401; 16.1%	129,023; 27.5%	—N/a	31,068; 6.6%
1997	160,411; 35.3%	—N/a	102,898; 22.7%	10,047; 2.2%	—N/a	30,114; 6.6%	144,142; 31.7%	—N/a	6,654; 1.5%
2000	168,802; 34.8%	—N/a	71,720; 14.8%	10,821; 2.2%	—N/a	36,274; 7.5%	183,637; 37.8%	—N/a	14,486; 3.0%
2004	193,007; 36.3%	147,032; 27.7%	154,273; 29.1%	29,998; 5.6%	—N/a	—N/a	—N/a	—N/a	6,667; 1.3%
2006	208,416; 37.0%	161,892; 28.7%	160,361; 28.4%	26,508; 4.7%	—N/a	—N/a	—N/a	—N/a	6,672; 1.2%
2008	147,311; 27.0%	196,133; 35.9%	145,787; 26.7%	52,996; 9.7%	—N/a	—N/a	—N/a	—N/a	3,712; 0.7%
2011	118,859; 21.1%	218,837; 38.8%	187,826; 33.3%	33,651; 6.0%	—N/a	—N/a	—N/a	—N/a	4,555; 0.8%
2015	297,551; 42.1%	174,976; 24.8%	189,319; 26.8%	37,079; 5.2%	—N/a	—N/a	—N/a	—N/a	7,633; 1.1%
2019	224,282; 32.5%	172,382; 25.0%	192,882; 27.9%	71,182; 10.3%	9,176; 1.3%	—N/a	—N/a	—N/a	20,926; 3.0%
2021	226,898; 35.0%	158,737; 24.5%	217,711; 33.6%	23,219; 3.6%	19,660; 3.0%	—N/a	—N/a	—N/a	2,391; 0.4%
2025	377,816; 50.6%	242,892; 32.5%	111,090; 14.9%	10,053; 1.3%	3,048; 0.4%	—N/a	—N/a	—N/a	1,894; 0.3%

Liberal Conservative New Democratic Green People's	Progressive Conservative (defunct) Alliance (defunct) Reform (defunct) Social Credit (defunct)

== 2021 ==
Electoral district	Candidates						Incumbent
Electoral district	Liberal	Conservative	NDP	Green	PPC	Other	Incumbent
Burnaby North—Seymour	Terry Beech 19,445 39.54%	Kelsey Shein 12,535 25.49%	Jim Hanson 14,318 29.11%	Peter Dolling 1,516 3.08%	Brad Nickerson 1,370 2.79%		Terry Beech
Burnaby South	Brea Huang Sami 12,361 30.44%	Likky Lavji 9,104 22.42%	Jagmeet Singh 16,382 40.34%	Maureen Curran 1,175 2.89%	Marcella Williams 1,290 3.18%	Martin Kendell (Ind.) 296 0.73%	Jagmeet Singh
Coquitlam—Port Coquitlam	Ron McKinnon 21,454 38.51%	Katerina Anastasiadis 16,907 30.34%	Laura Dupont 14,982 26.89%		Kimberly Brundell 2,373 4.26%		Ron McKinnon
New Westminster—Burnaby	Rozina Jaffer 11,685 23.69%	Paige Munro 9,710 19.69%	Peter Julian 24,054 48.77%	David Macdonald 2,035 4.13%	Kevin Heide 1,840 3.73%		Peter Julian
North Vancouver	Jonathan Wilkinson 26,756 45.10%	Les Jickling 16,671 28.10%	Tammy Bentz 11,750 19.81%	Archie Kaario 2,598 4.38%	John Galloway 1,545 2.60%		Jonathan Wilkinson
Port Moody—Coquitlam	Will Davis 14,231 27.32%	Nelly Shin 16,605 31.88%	Bonita Zarrillo 19,367 37.18%		Desta McPherson 1,766 3.39%	Roland Verrier (M-L) 122 0.23%	Nelly Shin
West Vancouver—Sunshine Coast—Sea to Sky Country	Patrick Weiler 21,500 33.88%	John Weston 19,062 30.04%	Avi Lewis 16,265 25.63%	Mike Simpson 4,108 6.47%	Doug Bebb 2,299 3.62%	Terry Grimwood (Ind.) 50 0.08%	Patrick Weiler
West Vancouver—Sunshine Coast—Sea to Sky Country	Patrick Weiler 21,500 33.88%	John Weston 19,062 30.04%	Avi Lewis 16,265 25.63%	Mike Simpson 4,108 6.47%	Doug Bebb 2,299 3.62%	Gordon Jeffrey (Rhino.) 98 0.15%	Patrick Weiler
West Vancouver—Sunshine Coast—Sea to Sky Country	Patrick Weiler 21,500 33.88%	John Weston 19,062 30.04%	Avi Lewis 16,265 25.63%	Mike Simpson 4,108 6.47%	Doug Bebb 2,299 3.62%	Chris MacGregor (Ind.) 77 0.12%	Patrick Weiler

Electoral district (riding)	Conservatives	Libreral	New Democratic Party	Green	Other	Incumbent
Burnaby North—Seymour	Kelsey Shein 12,535 25.49%	Terry Beech 19,445 39.54%	Jim Hanson 14,318 29.11%	Peter Dolling 1,516 3.08%	Brad Nickerson 1,370 2.79%	Terry Beech 19,445 39.54%
Burnaby South	Likky Lavji 9,104 22.42%					

== 2015 ==
Electoral district	Candidates							Incumbent
Electoral district	Conservative	NDP	Liberal	Green	Libertarian	Marxist-Leninist	Other	Incumbent
Burnaby North—Seymour	Mike Little; 14,612; 27.84%	Carol Baird Ellan; 15,537; 29.61%	Terry Beech; 18,938; 36.09%	Lynne Quarmby; 2,765; 5.27%	Chris Tylor; 252; 0.48%	Brian Sproule; 43; 0.08%	Helen Hee Soon Chang (Ind.); 207 0.39%	Kennedy Stewart‡ Burnaby—Douglas
Burnaby North—Seymour	Mike Little; 14,612; 27.84%	Carol Baird Ellan; 15,537; 29.61%	Terry Beech; 18,938; 36.09%	Lynne Quarmby; 2,765; 5.27%	Chris Tylor; 252; 0.48%	Brian Sproule; 43; 0.08%	Brent Jantzen (Comm.); 126 0.24%	Kennedy Stewart‡ Burnaby—Douglas
Burnaby South	Grace Seear; 12,441; 27.11%	Kennedy Stewart; 16,094; 35.07%	Adam Pankratz; 15,547; 33.88%	Wyatt Tessari; 1,306; 2.85%	Liz Jaluague; 499; 1.09%			New District
Coquitlam— Port Coquitlam	Douglas Horne; 18,083; 32.00%	Sara Norman; 15,400; 27.25%	Ron McKinnon; 19,938; 35.28%	Brad Nickason; 2,076; 3.67%	Lewis Clarke Dahlby; 1,014; 1.79%			James Moore†; Port Moody—Westwood—Port Coquitlam
New Westminster—Burnaby	Chloé Ellis; 10,512; 19.97%	Peter Julian; 22,876; 43.46%	Sasha Ramnarine; 15,253; 28.97%	Kyle Routledge; 2,487; 4.72%	Rex Brocki; 1,368; 2.60%	Joseph Theriault; 146; 0.28%		Peter Julian; Burnaby—New Westminster
North Vancouver	Andrew Saxton; 17,301; 26.88%	Carleen Thomas; 5,015; 7.79%	Jonathan Wilkinson; 36,458; 56.65%	Claire Martin; 5,350; 8.31%	Ismet Yetisen; 136; 0.21%		Payam Azad (Ind.); 94; 0.15%	Andrew Saxton
Port Moody—Coquitlam	Tim Laidler; 16,112; 29.47%	Fin Donnelly; 19,706; 36.05%	Jessie Adcock; 16,888; 30.89%	Marcus Madsen; 1,878; 3.44%		Roland Verrier; 83; 0.15%		Fin Donnelly; New Westminster—Coquitlam
Vancouver Centre	Elaine Allan; 9,818; 16.91%	Constance Barnes; 11,618; 20.01%	Hedy Fry; 32,554; 56.08%	Lisa Barrett; 3,370; 5.81%	John Clarke; 614; 1.06%	Michael Hill; 74; 0.13%		Hedy Fry
Vancouver East	James Low; 6,322; 10.77%	Jenny Kwan; 29,316; 49.94%	Edward Wong; 16,532; 28.16%	Wes Regan; 5,395; 9.19%		Anne Jamieson; 214; 0.36%	Peter Marcus (Comm.); 525 0.89%	Libby Davies†
Vancouver East	James Low; 6,322; 10.77%	Jenny Kwan; 29,316; 49.94%	Edward Wong; 16,532; 28.16%	Wes Regan; 5,395; 9.19%		Anne Jamieson; 214; 0.36%	D. Alex Millar (Ind.); 216 0.37%	Libby Davies†
Vancouver East	James Low; 6,322; 10.77%	Jenny Kwan; 29,316; 49.94%	Edward Wong; 16,532; 28.16%	Wes Regan; 5,395; 9.19%		Anne Jamieson; 214; 0.36%	Shawn Vulliez (Pirate); 188 0.32%	Libby Davies†
Vancouver Granville	Erinn Broshko; 14,028; 26.06%	Mira Oreck; 14,462; 26.87%	Jody Wilson-Raybould; 23,643; 43.93%	Michael Barkusky; 1,691; 3.14%				New District
Vancouver Kingsway	Jojo Quimpo; 9,538; 21.01%	Don Davies; 20,763; 45.74%	Steven Kou; 12,625; 27.81%	Catherine Moore; 1,476; 3.25%	Matt Kadioglu; 468; 1.03%	Donna Petersen; 81; 0.18%	Kimball Cariou (Comm.); 445; 0.98%	Don Davies
Vancouver Quadra	Blair Lockhart; 13,683; 25.83%	Scott Andrews; 5,748; 10.85%	Joyce Murray; 31,102; 58.71%	Kris Constable; 2,229; 4.21%			Marc Boyer (Mar.); 65 0.12%	Joyce Murray
Vancouver Quadra	Blair Lockhart; 13,683; 25.83%	Scott Andrews; 5,748; 10.85%	Joyce Murray; 31,102; 58.71%	Kris Constable; 2,229; 4.21%			Jean-François Caron (Ind.); 59 0.11%	Joyce Murray
Vancouver Quadra	Blair Lockhart; 13,683; 25.83%	Scott Andrews; 5,748; 10.85%	Joyce Murray; 31,102; 58.71%	Kris Constable; 2,229; 4.21%			Trevor Clinton Walper (Pirate); 86 0.16%	Joyce Murray
Vancouver South	Wai Young; 15,115; 33.88%	Amandeep Nijjar; 6,230; 13.97%	Harjit Sajjan; 21,773; 48.81%	Elain Ng; 1,149; 2.58%		Charles Boylan; 178; 0.40%	Raj Gupta (PC); 166; 0.37%	Wai Young
West Vancouver— Sunshine Coast— Sea to Sky Country	John Weston; 17,411; 26.20%	Larry Koopman; 6,554; 9.86%	Pam Goldsmith-Jones; 36,300; 54.62%	Ken Melamed; 5,907; 8.89%		Carol-Lee Chapman; 106; 0.16%	Robin Kehler (Mar.); 180; 0.27%	John Weston

== 2011 ==
Electoral district	Candidates					Incumbent
Electoral district	Conservative	Liberal	NDP	Green	Other	Incumbent
Burnaby—Douglas	Ronald Leung; 19,932; 40.92%	Ken Low; 5,451; 11.19%	Kennedy Stewart; 20,943; 43.00%	Adrianne Merlo; 1,754; 3.60%	Lewis Clarke Dahlby (Libert.); 420 0.86%	Bill Siksay†
Burnaby—Douglas	Ronald Leung; 19,932; 40.92%	Ken Low; 5,451; 11.19%	Kennedy Stewart; 20,943; 43.00%	Adrianne Merlo; 1,754; 3.60%	George Gidora (Comm.); 153 0.31%	Bill Siksay†
Burnaby—Douglas	Ronald Leung; 19,932; 40.92%	Ken Low; 5,451; 11.19%	Kennedy Stewart; 20,943; 43.00%	Adrianne Merlo; 1,754; 3.60%	Brian Sproule (M-L); 57 0.12%	Bill Siksay†
Burnaby— New Westminster	Paul Forseth; 16,009; 35.83%	Garth Evans; 4,496; 10.06%	Peter Julian; 22,193; 49.67%	Carrie McLaren; 1,731; 3.87%	Tyler Pierce (Libert.); 160 0.36%	Peter Julian
Burnaby— New Westminster	Paul Forseth; 16,009; 35.83%	Garth Evans; 4,496; 10.06%	Peter Julian; 22,193; 49.67%	Carrie McLaren; 1,731; 3.87%	Joseph Theriault (M-L); 94 0.21%	Peter Julian
New Westminster— Coquitlam	Diana Dilworth; 20,776; 41.45%	Ken Beck Lee; 4,069; 8.12%	Fin Donnelly; 23,023; 45.93%	Rebecca Helps; 2,160; 4.31%	Roland Verrier (M-L); 95; 0.19%	Fin Donnelly
North Vancouver	Andrew Saxton; 28,996; 48.62%	Taleeb Noormohamed; 17,665; 29.62%	Michael Charrois; 9,617; 16.13%	Greg Dowman; 3,004; 5.04%	Nick Jones (Ind.); 350; 0.59%	Andrew Saxton
Port Moody—Westwood— Port Coquitlam	James Moore; 27,181; 56.07%	Stewart McGillivray; 4,110; 8.48%	Mark Ireland; 14,600; 30.12%	Kevin Kim; 2,161; 4.46%	Paul Geddes (Libert.); 421; 0.87%	James Moore
Vancouver Centre	Jennifer Clarke; 15,323; 26.04%	Hedy Fry; 18,260; 31.03%	Karen Shillington; 15,325; 26.04%	Adriane Carr; 9,089; 15.44%	John Clarke (Libert.); 313 0.53%	Hedy Fry
Vancouver Centre	Jennifer Clarke; 15,323; 26.04%	Hedy Fry; 18,260; 31.03%	Karen Shillington; 15,325; 26.04%	Adriane Carr; 9,089; 15.44%	Michael Hill (M-L); 62 0.11%	Hedy Fry
Vancouver Centre	Jennifer Clarke; 15,323; 26.04%	Hedy Fry; 18,260; 31.03%	Karen Shillington; 15,325; 26.04%	Adriane Carr; 9,089; 15.44%	Michael Huenefeld (PC); 285 0.48%	Hedy Fry
Vancouver Centre	Jennifer Clarke; 15,323; 26.04%	Hedy Fry; 18,260; 31.03%	Karen Shillington; 15,325; 26.04%	Adriane Carr; 9,089; 15.44%	Travis McCrea (Pirate); 192 0.33%	Hedy Fry
Vancouver East	Irene C. Yatco; 8,361; 18.90%	Roma Ahi; 4,382; 9.91%	Libby Davies; 27,794; 62.83%	Douglas Roy; 3,383; 7.65%	Anne Jamieson (M-L); 318; 0.72%	Libby Davies
Vancouver Kingsway	Trang Nguyen; 13,157; 28.10%	Wendy Yuan; 7,796; 16.65%	Don Davies; 23,452; 50.08%	Louise Boutin; 1,860; 3.97%	Kimball Cariou (Comm.); 210 0.45%	Don Davies
Vancouver Kingsway	Trang Nguyen; 13,157; 28.10%	Wendy Yuan; 7,796; 16.65%	Don Davies; 23,452; 50.08%	Louise Boutin; 1,860; 3.97%	Matt Kadioglu (Libert.); 275 0.59%	Don Davies
Vancouver Kingsway	Trang Nguyen; 13,157; 28.10%	Wendy Yuan; 7,796; 16.65%	Don Davies; 23,452; 50.08%	Louise Boutin; 1,860; 3.97%	Donna Petersen (M-L); 78 0.17%	Don Davies
Vancouver Quadra	Deborah Meredith; 20,984; 38.64%	Joyce Murray; 22,903; 42.17%	Victor Edward Elkins; 7,499; 13.81%	Laura-Leah Shaw; 2,922; 5.38%		Joyce Murray
Vancouver South	Wai Young; 19,504; 43.31%	Ujjal Dosanjh; 15,604; 34.65%	Meena Wong; 8,552; 18.99%	Jean de Dieu Hakizimana; 1,151; 2.56%	Charles Boylan (M-L); 222; 0.49%	Ujjal Dosanjh
West Vancouver— Sunshine Coast— Sea to Sky Country	John Dunbar Weston; 28,614; 45.53%	Dan Veniez; 14,123; 22.47%	Terry Platt; 14,828; 23.59%	Brennan Wauters; 4,436; 7.06%	Tunya Audain (Libert.); 250 0.40%	John Weston
West Vancouver— Sunshine Coast— Sea to Sky Country	John Dunbar Weston; 28,614; 45.53%	Dan Veniez; 14,123; 22.47%	Terry Platt; 14,828; 23.59%	Brennan Wauters; 4,436; 7.06%	Carol Lee Chapman (M-L); 87 0.14%	John Weston
West Vancouver— Sunshine Coast— Sea to Sky Country	John Dunbar Weston; 28,614; 45.53%	Dan Veniez; 14,123; 22.47%	Terry Platt; 14,828; 23.59%	Brennan Wauters; 4,436; 7.06%	Doug Hartt (CAP); 64 0.10%	John Weston
West Vancouver— Sunshine Coast— Sea to Sky Country	John Dunbar Weston; 28,614; 45.53%	Dan Veniez; 14,123; 22.47%	Terry Platt; 14,828; 23.59%	Brennan Wauters; 4,436; 7.06%	Allan Holt (WBP); 156 0.25%	John Weston
West Vancouver— Sunshine Coast— Sea to Sky Country	John Dunbar Weston; 28,614; 45.53%	Dan Veniez; 14,123; 22.47%	Terry Platt; 14,828; 23.59%	Brennan Wauters; 4,436; 7.06%	Roger Lagassé (PC); 293 0.47%	John Weston

== 2008 ==
Electoral district	Candidates						Incumbent
Electoral district	Conservative	Liberal	NDP	Green	Libertarian	Other	Incumbent
Burnaby— Douglas	Ronald Leung; 17,139; 36.25%	Bill Cunningham; 9,177; 19.41%	Bill Siksay; 17,937; 37.94%	Doug Perry; 2,822; 5.97%		George Gidora (Comm.); 203; 0.43%	Bill Siksay
Burnaby— New Westminster	Sam Rakhra; 13,150; 30.35%	Gerry Lenoski; 6,681; 15.42%	Peter Julian; 20,145; 46.50%	Carrie McLaren; 3,067; 7.08%	Ismet Yetison; 186; 0.43%	Joseph Theriault (M-L); 96; 0.22%	Peter Julian
New Westminster— Coquitlam	Yonah Martin; 19,299; 38.84%	Michelle Hassen; 5,615; 11.30%	Dawn Black; 20,787; 41.83%	Marshall Smith; 3,574; 7.19%	Lewis C. Dahlby; 314; 0.63%	Roland Verrier (M-L); 103; 0.21%	Dawn Black
North Vancouver	Andrew Saxton; 24,371; 42.26%	Don Bell; 21,551; 37.37%	Michael Charrois; 5,417; 9.39%	Jim Stephenson; 6,168; 10.69%	Tunya Audain; 166; 0.29%		Don Bell
Port Moody— Westwood— Port Coquitlam	James Moore; 25,535; 54.61%	Ron McKinnon; 6,918; 14.79%	Zoë Royer; 10,418; 22.28%	Rod Brindamour; 3,568; 7.63%	Rob Gillespie; 321; 0.69%		James Moore
Vancouver Centre	Lorne Mayencourt; 14,118; 25.10%	Hedy Fry; 19,506; 34.51%	Michael Byers; 12,047; 21.31%	Adriane Carr; 10,354; 18.32%	John Clarke; 340; 0.60%	Michael Hill (M-L); 94; 0.17%	Hedy Fry
Vancouver East	Ryan Warawa; 6,432; 15.55%	Ken Low; 7,127; 17.23%	Libby Davies; 22,506; 54.40%	Mike Carr; 4,708; 11.38%		Anne Jamieson (M-L); 171 0.41%	Libby Davies
Vancouver East	Ryan Warawa; 6,432; 15.55%	Ken Low; 7,127; 17.23%	Libby Davies; 22,506; 54.40%	Mike Carr; 4,708; 11.38%		Betty Krawczyk (WLP); 425 1.03%	Libby Davies
Vancouver Kingsway	Salomon Rayek; 12,419; 27.42%	Wendy Yuan; 13,164; 29.06%	Don Davies; 15,933; 35.18%	Doug Warkentin; 3,031; 6.69%	Matt Kadioglu; 309; 0.68%	Kimball Cariou (Comm.); 291 0.64%	David Emerson†
Vancouver Kingsway	Salomon Rayek; 12,419; 27.42%	Wendy Yuan; 13,164; 29.06%	Don Davies; 15,933; 35.18%	Doug Warkentin; 3,031; 6.69%	Matt Kadioglu; 309; 0.68%	Donna Petersen (M-L); 149 0.33%	David Emerson†
Vancouver Quadra	Deborah Meredith; 20,561; 36.92%	Joyce Murray; 25,393; 45.59%	David Caplan; 4,493; 8.07%	Dan Grice; 4,916; 8.83%	Noris Barens; 333; 0.60%		Joyce Murray
Vancouver South	Wai Young; 16,090; 38.44%	Ujjal Dosanjh; 16,110; 38.49%	Ann Chambers; 7,376; 17.62%	Csaba Gulyas; 2,065; 4.93%		Charles Boylan (M-L); 211; 0.50%	Ujjal Dosanjh
West Vancouver— Sunshine Coast— Sea to Sky Country	John Weston; 26,949; 44.57%	Ian Sutherland; 16,069; 26.57%	Bill Forst; 8,728; 14.43%	Blair Wilson; 8,723; 14.43%			Blair Wilson

== 2006 ==
Electoral district	Candidates						Incumbent
Electoral district	Liberal	Conservative	NDP	Green	Marxist-Leninist	Other	Incumbent
Burnaby—Douglas	Bill Cunningham; 16,079; 33.02%	George Drazenovic; 13,467; 27.65%	Bill Siksay; 17,323; 35.57%	Ray Power; 1,694; 3.48%		Timothy George Gidora (Comm.); 138; 0.28%	Bill Siksay
Burnaby—New Westminster	Mary Pynenburg; 13,420; 29.94%	Marc Dalton; 12,364; 27.58%	Peter Julian; 17,391; 38.79%	Scott Henry Janzen; 1,654; 3.69%			Peter Julian
New Westminster—Coquitlam	Joyce Murray; 11,931; 23.53%	Paul Forseth; 16,494; 32.53%	Dawn Black; 19,427; 38.32%	Sven Biggs; 1,496; 2.95%	Joseph Theriault; 54; 0.11%	Dick Estey (Ind.); 123 0.24%	Paul Forseth
New Westminster—Coquitlam	Joyce Murray; 11,931; 23.53%	Paul Forseth; 16,494; 32.53%	Dawn Black; 19,427; 38.32%	Sven Biggs; 1,496; 2.95%	Joseph Theriault; 54; 0.11%	Paul Warnett (Ind.); 1,174 2.32%	Paul Forseth
North Vancouver	Don Bell; 25,357; 42.35%	Cindy Silver; 22,021; 36.78%	Sherry Shaghaghi; 7,903; 13.20%	Jim Stephenson; 4,483; 7.49%	Michael Hill; 112; 0.19%		Don Bell
Port Moody—Westwood— Port Coquitlam	Jon Kingsbury; 13,134; 27.06%	James Moore; 19,961; 41.12%	Mary Woo Sims; 11,196; 23.07%	Scott Froom; 1,623; 3.34%		Lewis Dahlby (Libert.); 309 0.64%	James Moore
Port Moody—Westwood— Port Coquitlam	Jon Kingsbury; 13,134; 27.06%	James Moore; 19,961; 41.12%	Mary Woo Sims; 11,196; 23.07%	Scott Froom; 1,623; 3.34%		Greg Watrich (Ind.); 2,317 4.77%	James Moore
Vancouver Centre	Hedy Fry; 25,013; 43.80%	Tony Fogarassy; 11,684; 20.46%	Svend Robinson; 16,374; 28.67%	Jared Evans; 3,340; 5.85%		Heathcliff Dionysus Campbell (Mar.); 259 0.45%	Hedy Fry
Vancouver Centre	Hedy Fry; 25,013; 43.80%	Tony Fogarassy; 11,684; 20.46%	Svend Robinson; 16,374; 28.67%	Jared Evans; 3,340; 5.85%		John Clarke (Libert.); 304 0.53%	Hedy Fry
Vancouver Centre	Hedy Fry; 25,013; 43.80%	Tony Fogarassy; 11,684; 20.46%	Svend Robinson; 16,374; 28.67%	Jared Evans; 3,340; 5.85%		Joe Pal (CHP); 130 0.23%	Hedy Fry
Vancouver East	David Carl Haggard; 9,907; 23.42%	Elizabeth M. Pagtakhan; 5,631; 13.31%	Libby Davies; 23,927; 56.57%	Christine Ellis; 2,536; 6.00%		Bryce Bartholomew (CAP); 293; 0.69%	Libby Davies
Vancouver Kingsway	David Emerson; 20,062; 43.45%	Kanman Wong; 8,679; 18.80%	Ian Waddell; 15,470; 33.51%	Arno Schortinghuis; 1,307; 2.83%	Donna Petersen; 68; 0.15%	Kimball Cariou (Comm.); 162 0.35%	David Emerson
Vancouver Kingsway	David Emerson; 20,062; 43.45%	Kanman Wong; 8,679; 18.80%	Ian Waddell; 15,470; 33.51%	Arno Schortinghuis; 1,307; 2.83%	Donna Petersen; 68; 0.15%	Connie Fogal (CAP); 143 0.31%	David Emerson
Vancouver Kingsway	David Emerson; 20,062; 43.45%	Kanman Wong; 8,679; 18.80%	Ian Waddell; 15,470; 33.51%	Arno Schortinghuis; 1,307; 2.83%	Donna Petersen; 68; 0.15%	Matt Kadioglu (Libert.); 277 0.60%	David Emerson
Vancouver Quadra	Stephen Owen; 28,655; 49.14%	Stephen Rogers; 16,844; 28.89%	David Askew; 9,379; 16.08%	Ben West; 2,974; 5.10%	Donovan Young; 41; 0.07%	Marc Boyer (Mar.); 158 0.27%	Stephen Owen
Vancouver Quadra	Stephen Owen; 28,655; 49.14%	Stephen Rogers; 16,844; 28.89%	David Askew; 9,379; 16.08%	Ben West; 2,974; 5.10%	Donovan Young; 41; 0.07%	Betty Krawczyk (Ind.); 263 0.45%	Stephen Owen
Vancouver South	Ujjal Dosanjh; 20,991; 48.05%	Tarlok Sablok; 11,856; 27.14%	Bev Meslo; 9,205; 21.07%	Doug Perry; 1,435; 3.28%	Charles Boylan; 202; 0.46%		Ujjal Dosanjh
West Vancouver—Sunshine Coast —Sea to Sky Country	Blair Wilson; 23,867; 37.51%	John Weston; 22,891; 35.97%	Judith Wilson; 12,766; 20.06%	Silvaine Zimmermann; 3,966; 6.23%	Anne Jamieson; 145; 0.23%		John Reynolds†

== 2004 ==
Parties	1st	2nd	3rd	4th
Liberal	5	5	1	0
New Democratic	3	3	5	0
Conservative	3	3	5	0
Green	0	0	0	11

Electoral district	Candidates							Incumbent
Electoral district	Liberal	Conservative	NDP	Green	Canadian Action	Communist	Other	Incumbent
Burnaby—Douglas	Bill Cunningham^{@} 14,748; 32.53%	George Drazenovic; 12,531; 27.64%	Bill Siksay; 15,682; 34.59%	Shawn Hunsdale; 1,687; 3.72%		Hanne Gidora; 122; 0.27%	Frank Cerminara (Ind.); 282 0.62%	Svend Robinson†
Burnaby—Douglas	Bill Cunningham^{@} 14,748; 32.53%	George Drazenovic; 12,531; 27.64%	Bill Siksay; 15,682; 34.59%	Shawn Hunsdale; 1,687; 3.72%		Hanne Gidora; 122; 0.27%	Adam Desaulniers (Libert.); 291 0.64%	Svend Robinson†
Burnaby—New Westminster	Mary Pynenburg; 13,732; 32.93%	Mike Redmond; 11,821; 28.35%	Peter Julian; 14,061; 33.72%	Revel Kunz; 1,606; 3.85%	Dana Green; 312; 0.75%	Péter Pál Horváth; 166; 0.40%		new district
New Westminster—Coquitlam	Dave Haggard; 13,080; 27.40%	Paul Forseth; 15,693; 32.87%	Steve McClurg; 15,580; 32.64%	Carli Travers; 2,684; 5.62%			Jack Hummelman (CHP); 700; 1.47%	Paul Forseth
North Vancouver	Don H. Bell; 22,619; 40.03%	Ted White; 20,548; 36.36%	John Nelson; 8,967; 15.87%	Peggy Stortz; 4,114; 7.28%	Andres Esteban Barker; 181; 0.32%		Michael Hill (M-L); 77; 0.14%	Ted White
Port Moody—Westwood—Port Coquitlam	Kwangyul Peck; 12,445; 27.30%	James Moore; 18,664; 40.94%	Charley King; 12,023; 26.38%	Richard Voigt; 1,971; 4.32%	Pat Goff; 111; 0.24%	George Gidora; 94; 0.21%	Lewis Dahlby (Libert.); 276; 0.61%	James Moore
Vancouver Centre	Hedy Fry; 21,280; 40.31%	Gary Mitchell; 10,139; 19.21%	Kennedy Stewart; 17,050; 32.30%	Robbie Mattu; 3,580; 6.78%	Alexander Frei; 101; 0.19%	Kimball Carriou; 96; 0.18%	John Clarke (Libert.); 304 0.58%	Hedy Fry
Vancouver Centre	Hedy Fry; 21,280; 40.31%	Gary Mitchell; 10,139; 19.21%	Kennedy Stewart; 17,050; 32.30%	Robbie Mattu; 3,580; 6.78%	Alexander Frei; 101; 0.19%	Kimball Carriou; 96; 0.18%	Joe Pal (CHP); 243 0.46%	Hedy Fry
Vancouver East	Shirley Chan^{@} 10,768; 25.93%	Harvey Grigg; 4,153; 10.00%	Libby Davies; 23,452; 56.46%	Ron Plowright; 2,365; 5.69%			Marc Boyer (Mar.); 399 0.96%	Libby Davies
Vancouver East	Shirley Chan^{@} 10,768; 25.93%	Harvey Grigg; 4,153; 10.00%	Libby Davies; 23,452; 56.46%	Ron Plowright; 2,365; 5.69%			Gloria Anne Kieler (CHP); 250 0.60%	Libby Davies
Vancouver East	Shirley Chan^{@} 10,768; 25.93%	Harvey Grigg; 4,153; 10.00%	Libby Davies; 23,452; 56.46%	Ron Plowright; 2,365; 5.69%			Louis James Lesosky (NA); 147 0.35%	Libby Davies
Vancouver Kingsway	David Emerson^{@} 17,267; 40.44%	Jesse Johl; 7,037; 16.48%	Ian Waddell; 15,916; 37.28%	Tracey Jastinder Mann; 1,521; 3.56%	Jacob Rempel; 142; 0.33%	Jason Mann; 172; 0.40%	Jeannie Kwan (NA); 548 1.28%	Sophia Leung†
Vancouver Kingsway	David Emerson^{@} 17,267; 40.44%	Jesse Johl; 7,037; 16.48%	Ian Waddell; 15,916; 37.28%	Tracey Jastinder Mann; 1,521; 3.56%	Jacob Rempel; 142; 0.33%	Jason Mann; 172; 0.40%	Donna Petersen (M-L); 94 0.22%	Sophia Leung†
Vancouver Quadra	Stephen Owen; 29,187; 52.43%	Stephen Rogers; 14,648; 26.31%	David Askew; 8,348; 15.00%	Doug Warkentin; 3,118; 5.60%	Connie Fogal; 165; 0.30%		Katrina Chowne (Libert.); 151 0.27%	Stephen Owen
Vancouver Quadra	Stephen Owen; 29,187; 52.43%	Stephen Rogers; 14,648; 26.31%	David Askew; 8,348; 15.00%	Doug Warkentin; 3,118; 5.60%	Connie Fogal; 165; 0.30%		Donovan Young (M-L); 48 0.09%	Stephen Owen
Vancouver South	Ujjal Dosanjh^{@} 18,196; 44.52%	Victor Soo Chan; 10,426; 25.51%	Bev Meslo; 10,038; 24.56%	Doug Perry; 1,465; 3.58%	Joe Sixpack Horrocks; 90; 0.22%	Stephen Von Sychowski; 105; 0.26%	Charles Boylan (M-L); 119 0.29%	Herb Dhaliwal†
Vancouver South	Ujjal Dosanjh^{@} 18,196; 44.52%	Victor Soo Chan; 10,426; 25.51%	Bev Meslo; 10,038; 24.56%	Doug Perry; 1,465; 3.58%	Joe Sixpack Horrocks; 90; 0.22%	Stephen Von Sychowski; 105; 0.26%	H. Sandhu (NA); 98 0.24%	Herb Dhaliwal†
Vancouver South	Ujjal Dosanjh^{@} 18,196; 44.52%	Victor Soo Chan; 10,426; 25.51%	Bev Meslo; 10,038; 24.56%	Doug Perry; 1,465; 3.58%	Joe Sixpack Horrocks; 90; 0.22%	Stephen Von Sychowski; 105; 0.26%	Frank Wagner (CHP); 339 0.83%	Herb Dhaliwal†
West Vancouver—Sunshine Coast	Blair Wilson; 19,685; 32.51%	John Reynolds; 21,372; 35.30%	Nicholas Simons; 13,156; 21.73%	Andrea Goldsmith; 5,887; 9.72%	Marc Bombois; 321; 0.53%		Anne Jamieson (M-L); 123; 0.20%	John Reynolds

=== Maps ===
1. Burnaby-Douglas
2. Burnaby-New Westminster
3. New Westminster-Coquitlam
4. North Vancouver
5. Port Moody-Westwood-Port Coquitlam
6. Vancouver Centre
7. Vancouver East
8. Vancouver South
9. Vancouver-Kingsway
10. Vancouver-Quadra
11. West Vancouver-Sunshine Coast-Sea to Sky Country
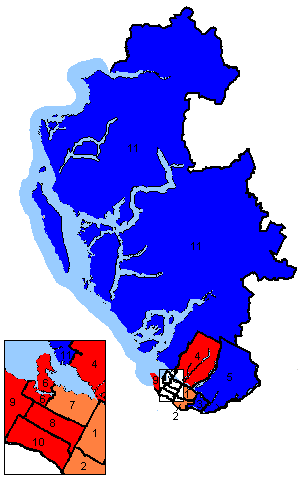
Key map

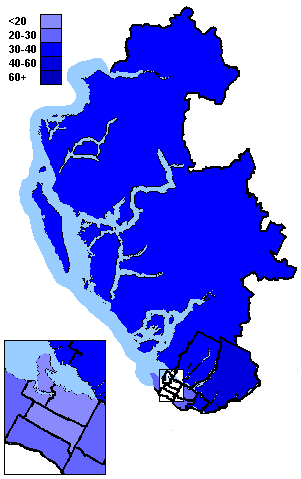
Conservative Party of Canada

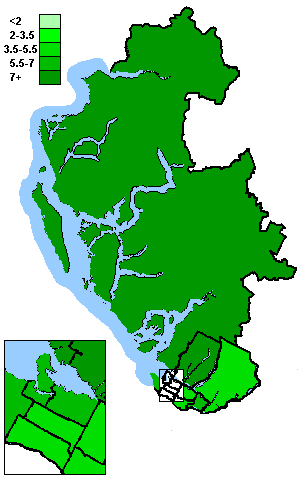
Green Party of Canada

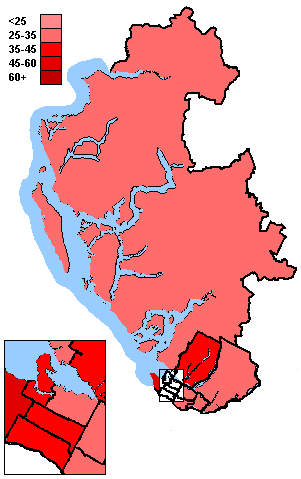
Liberal Party of Canada

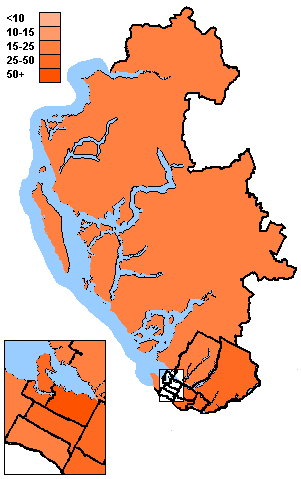
New Democratic Party

== 2000 ==
Parties	1st	2nd	3rd	4th
Liberal	4	5	1	0
Alliance	4	5	1	0
New Democratic	2	0	5	3
Progressive Conservative	0	0	3	7

Electoral district	Candidates						Incumbent
Electoral district	Liberal	Canadian Alliance	NDP	PC	Green	Other	Incumbent
Burnaby—Douglas	Francesca Zumpano; 10,774	Alan Mcdonnell; 15,057	Svend Robinson; 17,018	Kenneth Edgar King; 2,477		189	Svend Robinson
New Westminster—Coquitlam—Burnaby	Lee Rankin; 14,529	Paul Forseth; 20,698	Lorrie Williams; 7,076	Mike Redmond; 3,492	François C. Nantel; 1,028	202	Paul Forseth
North Vancouver	Bill Bell; 18,343	Ted White; 27,920	Sam Schechter; 2,760	Laurence Putnam; 3,975		2,978	Ted White
Port Moody—Coquitlam—Port Coquitlam	Lou Sekora; 16,937	James Moore; 28,631	Jamie Arden; 5,340	Joe Gluska; 4,506	Dave King; 839	1,368	Lou Sekora (Note: Elected in a 1998 by-election following the resignation of Reform MP Sharon Hayes.); Port Moody—Coquitlam
Vancouver Centre	Hedy Fry; 24,553	John Mortimer; 15,176	Scott Robertson; 6,993	Lee Johnson; 6,828	Jamie-Lee Hamilton; 2,285	2,209	Hedy Fry
Vancouver East	Mason Loh; 13,421	Sal Vetro; 5,536	Libby Davies; 16,818	Michael Walsh; 1,439	Kelly Elizabeth White; 975	1,592	Libby Davies
Vancouver Kingsway	Sophia Leung; 16,118	Alice Wong; 11,076	Victor Wong; 5,921	Kanman Wong; 1,803	Phillip Petrik; 1,009	1,494	Sophia Leung
Vancouver Quadra	Stephen Owen; 22,253	Kerry-Lynne Findlay; 18,613	Loretta Woodcock; 2,595	Bill Clarke; 4,112	Doug Warkentin; 1,434	625	Ted McWhinney
Vancouver South—Burnaby	Herb Dhaliwal; 17,705	Ron Jack; 15,384	Herschel Hardin; 3,848	Dan Tidball; 2,649	Imtiaz Popat; 646	1,235	Herb Dhaliwal
West Vancouver—Sunshine Coast	Ian Mckay; 14,169	John Reynolds; 25,546	Telis Savvaidis; 3,351	Kate Manvell; 4,993	Jane Bishop; 2,605	2,594	John Reynolds

== 1997 ==
Parties	1st	2nd	3rd	4th
Liberal	4	4	2	0
Reform	4	4	2	0
New Democratic	2	2	5	1
Progressive Conservative	0	0	1	8
Green	0	0	0	1

Electoral district	Candidates						Incumbent
Electoral district	Liberal	Reform	NDP	PC	Green	Other	Incumbent
Burnaby—Douglas	Mobina Jaffer; 11,536	Gary Eyre; 11,743	Svend Robinson; 19,058	Ray Power; 1,498		403	Svend Robinson; Burnaby—Kingsway
New Westminster—Coquitlam—Burnaby	Celso Boscariol; 13,437	Paul Forseth; 15,915	Dawn Black; 14,067	Debra Hicks; 1,803	Tom Hetherington; 691	253	Paul Forseth; New Westminster—Burnaby
North Vancouver	Warren Kinsella; 18,806	Ted White; 27,075	Martin Stuible; 5,075	Dennis Prouse; 2,740	Peggy Stortz; 982	730	Ted White
Port Moody—Coquitlam	Kwangyul Peck; 15,636	Sharon Hayes; 23,113	Joy Langan; 10,444	Joe Gluska; 2,927	Debra Lynne Eilers; 695	190	Sharon Hayes
Vancouver Centre	Hedy Fry; 20,878	Richard Farbridge; 11,567	Bill Siksay; 10,690	Victoria Minnes; 4,736	Paul Alexander; 1,541	1,806	Hedy Fry
Vancouver East	Anna Terrana; 13,123	Keith Mitchell; 4,287	Libby Davies; 14,961	Jerry Cikes; 964	Stuart Parker; 1,221	851	Anna Terrana
Vancouver Kingsway	Sophia Leung; 14,182	Raymond Leung; 6,412	Victor Wong; 10,662	Kan Wong; 1,385	Irene Louise Schmidt; 811	1,459	New district
Vancouver Quadra	Ted McWhinney; 18,847	Joanne Easdown; 12,340	Donovan T. Kuehn; 4,486	Geoff Chutter; 7,546	Kelly White; 1,155	346	Ted McWhinney
Vancouver South—Burnaby	Herb Dhaliwal; 16,648	Doug Hargrove; 11,598	Herschel Hardin; 7,467	Don Couch; 2,321	Cyndi Thompson; 633	362	Herb Dhaliwal; Vancouver South
West Vancouver—Sunshine Coast	Phil Boname; 17,318	John Reynolds; 20,092	Clark Banks; 5,988	Dave Thomas; 4,194	Lisa Barrett; 2,318	254	Herb Grubel; Capilano—Howe Sound
