= Campaign Politics =

Campaign Politics is a Canadian television show which airs on CPAC during federal elections. The program features CPAC journalists and hosts profiling different Canadian electoral districts, including feature interviews with the major party candidates, campaign volunteers and voters in the district.

== 2004 election ==
The following ridings were profiled during the 2004 election:

- Dartmouth—Cole Harbour: Susan MacAlpine-Gillis (NDP), Michael Savage (Liberal), Michael MacDonald (Conservative)
- Kings—Hants
- Fredericton: Andy Scott (Liberal), John Carty (NDP)
- Saint John
- Ottawa Centre
- Ottawa South
- Newmarket—Aurora: Belinda Stronach (Conservative), Martha Hall Findlay (Liberal), Ed Chudak (NDP), Dorian Baxter (Progressive Canadian Party)
- Toronto—Danforth
- York West: Judy Sgro (Liberal), Sandra Romano Anthony (NDP), Leslie Soobrian (Conservative), Joseph Grubb (Christian Heritage Party)
- Hamilton East—Stoney Creek
- Thunder Bay—Rainy River: Ken Boshcoff (Liberal), John Rafferty (NDP), David Leskowski (Conservative)
- Winnipeg North: Judy Wasylycia-Leis (NDP), Rey Pagtakhan (Liberal), Alon Weinberg (Green)
- Charleswood—St. James: Glen Murray (Liberal), Steven Fletcher (Conservative), Peter Carney (NDP)
- Saskatoon—Wanuskewin: Maurice Vellacott (Conservative), Chris Axworthy (Liberal), Priscilla Settee (NDP)
- Lethbridge: Rick Casson (Conservative), Ken Nicol (Liberal), Melanee Thomas (NDP), Ken Vanden Broek (CHP)
- Edmonton—Strathcona: Rahim Jaffer (Conservative), Debby Carlson (Liberal), Malcolm Azania (NDP)
- Chilliwack—Fraser Canyon: Chuck Strahl (Conservative), Bob Besner (Liberal), Rollie Keith (NDP), Ron Gray (CHP)
- Burnaby—Douglas: Bill Siksay (NDP), Bill Cunningham (Liberal), George Drazenovic (Conservative)
- Vancouver Kingsway: David Emerson (Liberal), Ian Waddell (NDP), Jesse Johl (Conservative), Tracey Mann (Green)

== 2006 election ==
The following ridings were profiled during the 2006 election:

- Avalon
- St. John's South—Mount Pearl: Loyola Hearn (Conservative), Peg Norman (NDP)
- Dartmouth—Cole Harbour: Michael Savage (Liberal), Peter Mancini (NDP)
- South Shore—St. Margaret's: Gerald Keddy (Conservative), Gordon Earle (NDP)
- West Nova: Robert Thibault (Liberal), Arthur Bull (NDP), Matt Granger (Green)
- Prince Edward Island (all four ridings profiled in one show)
- Saint John: Terry Albright (NDP)
- Fredericton: John Carty (NDP)
- Chicoutimi—Le Fjord
- Louis-Saint-Laurent: Bernard Cleary (BQ), Josée Verner (Conservative)
- Brome—Missisquoi: Heward Grafftey (Progressive Canadian Party)
- Beauce
- Jeanne-Le Ber: Liza Frulla (Liberal), Thierry St-Cyr (BQ)
- Outremont: Jean-Paul Lauzon (NDP)
- Papineau: Pierre Pettigrew (Liberal)
- Gatineau: Françoise Boivin (Liberal)
- Ottawa Centre: Paul Dewar (NDP), Richard Mahoney (Liberal), David Chernushenko (Green)
- Ottawa West—Nepean: Marlene Rivier (NDP)
- Northumberland—Quinte West
- Newmarket—Aurora: Belinda Stronach (Liberal), Lois Brown (Conservative), Ed Chudak (NDP)
- Whitby—Ajax
- Beaches—East York: Maria Minna (Liberal), Marilyn Churley (NDP), Peter Conroy (Conservatives), Jim Harris (Green)
- St. Paul's: Carolyn Bennett (Liberal), Peter Kent (Conservative), Paul Summerville (NDP)
- Trinity—Spadina: Olivia Chow (NDP), Tony Ianno (Liberal)
- Parkdale—High Park: Peggy Nash (NDP)
- Etobicoke—Lakeshore: Michael Ignatieff (Liberal), John Capobianco (Conservative), Liam McHugh-Russell (NDP)
- Hamilton Mountain: Chris Charlton (NDP)
- Haldimand—Norfolk: Diane Finley (Conservative), Bob Speller (Liberal)
- London—Fanshawe: Irene Mathyssen (NDP)
- Middlesex—Kent—Lambton: Bev Shipley (Conservative)
- Sault Ste. Marie: Tony Martin (NDP)
- Selkirk—Interlake
- Kildonan—St. Paul
- Charleswood—St. James—Assiniboia: Steven Fletcher (Conservative)
- Palliser: Dave Batters (Conservative), Jo-Ann Dusel (NDP), John Williams (Liberal)
- Regina—Qu'Appelle: Lorne Nystrom (NDP), Andrew Scheer (Conservative), Allyce Herle (Liberal)
- Desnethé—Missinippi—Churchill River: Anita Jackson (NDP), Jeremy Harrison (Conservative)
- Saskatoon—Humboldt: Brad Trost (Conservative), Andrew Mason (NDP)
- Saskatoon—Rosetown—Biggar: Carol Skelton (Conservative), Nettie Wiebe (NDP), Myron Luczka (Liberal)
- Edmonton—Mill Woods—Beaumont
- Calgary North Centre: Jim Prentice (Conservative), John Chan (NDP), Mark MacGillivray (Green)
- Burnaby—New Westminster: Peter Julian (NDP), Mary Pynenburg (Liberal)
- Burnaby—Douglas: Bill Siksay (NDP), Bill Cunningham (Liberal)
- Newton—North Delta: Nancy Clegg (NDP)
- New Westminster—Coquitlam: Paul Forseth (Conservative), Dawn Black (NDP), Joyce Murray (Liberal)
- North Vancouver: Don Bell (Liberal), Cindy Silver (Conservative)
- Vancouver Centre: Hedy Fry (Liberal), Svend Robinson (NDP)
- West Vancouver—Sunshine Coast: Blair Wilson (Liberal)
- Esquimalt—Juan de Fuca: Keith Martin (Liberal), Randall Garrison (NDP)
- Victoria: David Mulroney (Liberal), Ariel Lade (Green)
- Yukon: Larry Bagnell (Liberal), Pam Boyde (NDP)

== 2008 election ==
- Central Nova: Peter Mackay (Conservative), Elizabeth May (Green), Louise Lorefice (NDP)
- Edmonton Centre:
- Guelph: Mike Nagy (Green)
- Halton
- Papineau: Vivian Barbot (BQ), Justin Trudeau (Liberal), Ingrid Hein (Green), Mustaque Sarker (Conservative)
- Parkdale—High Park: Peggy Nash (NDP), Gerard Kennedy (Liberal), (Green), (Conservative)
- Parry Sound-Muskoka: Tony Clement (Conservative), Glen Hodgson (Green), Jamie McGarvey (Liberal), Jo-Anne Boulding (NDP)
- Saint-Lambert
- St. John's East: Jack Harris (NDP), (Conservative), (Liberal), (Green)
- Thornhill: Susan Kadis (Liberal), Peter Kent (Conservative), Simon Strelchik (NDP), Norbert Koehl (Green)
- Thunder Bay—Superior North: Bev Sarafin (Conservative), Bruce Hyer (NDP), Don McArthur (Liberal), Brendan Hughes (Green)
- Vaudreuil-Soulanges
- West Vancouver—Sunshine Coast—Sea to Sky Country:
- Westmount—Ville-Marie
