= Peter Julian =

Canadian politician (born 1962)

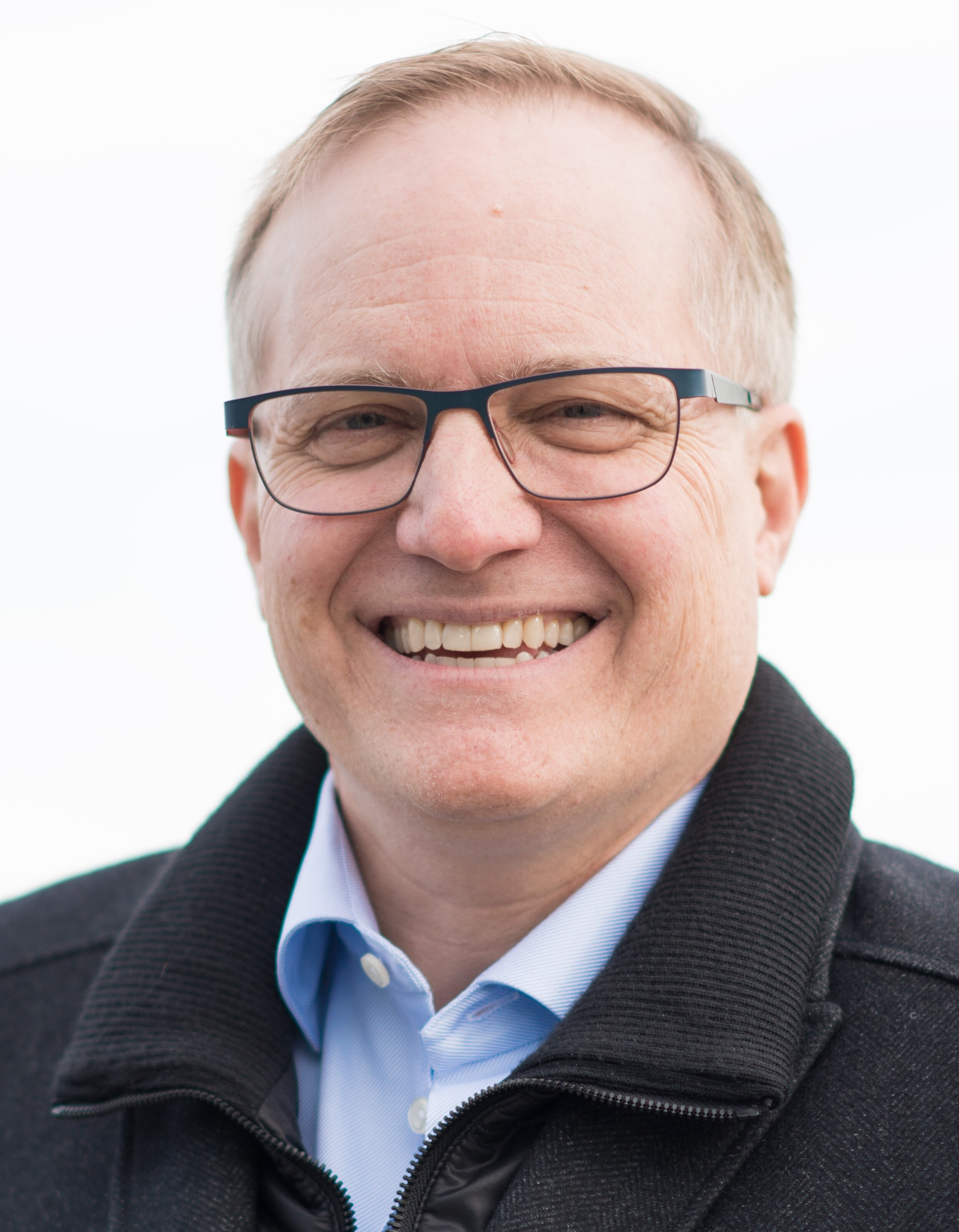
- Julian in 2017

House Leader of the New Democratic Party
- In office March 14, 2019 – April 28, 2025
- Leader: Jagmeet Singh
- Preceded by: Ruth Ellen Brosseau
- Succeeded by: Alexandre Boulerice
- In office October 24, 2017 – January 24, 2018
- Leader: Jagmeet Singh
- Preceded by: Murray Rankin
- Succeeded by: Ruth Ellen Brosseau
- In office March 20, 2014 – October 18, 2016
- Leader: Tom Mulcair
- Preceded by: Nathan Cullen
- Succeeded by: Murray Rankin

Opposition House Leader
- In office March 20, 2014 – October 19, 2015
- Leader: Tom Mulcair
- Preceded by: Nathan Cullen
- Succeeded by: Andrew Scheer

Member of Parliament for New Westminster—Burnaby Burnaby—New Westminster (2004–2015)
- In office June 28, 2004 – April 28, 2025
- Preceded by: riding established
- Succeeded by: Jake Sawatzky

Shadow Minister for Natural Resources
- In office April 19, 2012 – March 19, 2014
- Leader: Tom Mulcair
- Shadowing: Joe Oliver
- Preceded by: Claude Gravelle
- Succeeded by: Chris Charlton

Shadow Minister for Industry
- In office May 26, 2011 – October 31, 2011
- Leader: Jack Layton; Nycole Turmel
- Shadowing: Christian Paradis
- Preceded by: Marc Garneau
- Succeeded by: Guy Caron

Personal details
- Born: April 16, 1962 (age 64) New Westminster, British Columbia, Canada
- Party: New Democratic Party
- Spouse: Limei Tian
- Education: Université du Québec à Montréal (BA)
- Profession: Community activist, politician

Peter S. Julian (born April 16, 1962) is a Canadian politician who was a Member of Parliament for the New Democratic Party (NDP) from 2004 to 2025. He represented the ridings of Burnaby—New Westminster from 2004 to 2015 and New Westminster—Burnaby from 2015 to 2025. He also served as the house leader for the NDP for much of his political career. He was defeated in the 2025 Canadian federal election.

== Personal life ==
Julian was born on April 16, 1962, in New Westminster, British Columbia, to Terry and Ruth Julian. His father Terry was a school administrator, historian and author, and a 2002 recipient of the Queen's Jubilee Medal. He has a sister, Randi, and a brother, Patrick.

Julian played basketball for Douglas College and was a sports reporter for The Other Press in the 1980's. Prior to his political career, Julian worked in a variety of settings, including as a financial administrator, and as a manual labourer at an oil refinery, factories and various small businesses.

Julian is fluently bilingual in English and French and is also functional in American Sign Language. He lives in the 10th Avenue area of New Westminster. He graduated from New Westminster Secondary School and holds a bachelor's degree in political science from the Université du Québec à Montréal with a specialization in International Relations.

== Political career ==
In 2002, Julian ran for the city council in New Westminster, British Columbia. He received 3,275 votes, losing a spot on the council by 74 votes.

After losing his bid for city council, Julian ran for the New Democratic Party nomination in the riding of Burnaby—New Westminster, British Columbia. On March 7, 2004, Julian defeated Dave Mackinon to be the NDP's candidate in the 2004 federal election. Julian won the general election, defeating Mary Pynenburg of the Liberal Party of Canada by just 329 votes. He was re-elected by 3,971 votes over Pynenburg in 2006. In the federal election held on October 14, 2008, Julian won the riding of Burnaby—New Westminster by over 6,900 votes. Julian won the riding again in 2011 with 49.67% of the votes.

In the New Democratic Party Shadow Cabinet, Julian was the Energy and Natural Resources Critic. Julian previously served as the NDP critic for International Trade, Transportation, Persons with Disabilities, Treasury Board, Western Fisheries Critic, Industry, and the 2010 Vancouver-Whistler Olympics. Julian also served as the Deputy NDP Caucus Chair. During the 2011–12 NDP leadership race, Julian took over from candidate Peggy Nash to serve as the NDP's Finance Critic until the race was over, at which point Nash retook her spot and Julian was shifted to the lower-profile position of Energy Critic.

Julian vocally opposed the Security and Prosperity Partnership (SPP) that he believed threatened Canada's sovereignty through deep integration with the United States and Mexico. As NDP Transport Critic, Julian led the successful fight in the House of Commons to stop the SMS transport safety bill, which he believed to be an attempt to turn safety over to air transport companies themselves, something Julian termed "self-serve safety". Julian also initiated an NDP task force to meet and consult with diverse Canadian immigrant communities across the country, and to learn more about the challenges they face.

The Georgia Straight newspaper has called Julian "one of the region's hardest working politicians". Julian ranked third of 308 MPs in the 39th Parliament on bills, votes, and speeches.

Amid the NDP's third-place performance in the 2015 federal election, Julian was re-elected. Party leader Tom Mulcair appointed him to continue serving as NDP House Leader.

On December 21, 2016, Julian registered to run in the NDP leadership race to succeed Tom Mulcair. He withdrew on July 5, 2017, after trailing fellow candidates Charlie Angus, Niki Ashton, Guy Caron, and Jagmeet Singh in fundraising. He subsequently endorsed Singh for leader.

On January 31, 2018, Julian was named finance critic in the NDP shadow cabinet by party leader Jagmeet Singh. In addition, Julian was made House Leader of the NDP and energy critic on March 14, 2019.

In the 2025 Canadian federal election, Julian was unseated by Liberal candidate Jake Sawatzky.

== Volunteer work ==
He also co-founded the Save St. Mary's Hospital Community Coalition. He was a founding member of the BC Disability Employment Network and the Burnaby-New Westminster Council of Canadians. He has also volunteered for the local Emergency Social Services, for Royal City Soccer, East Burnaby Minor Baseball, the United Way, and the United Church of Canada.

== Committees ==
- Canadian House of Commons Standing Committee on International Trade

== Electoral record ==
=== Summary ===
Electoral history of Peter Julian – Constituency elections
Year	Type	Riding	Party	Votes for Julian				Result	Swing
Year	Type	Riding	Party	Total	%	P.	±%	Result	Swing
1989	Quebec general	Saint-François	Parti de la démocratie socialiste	884	3.07%	4th	-1.15	Lost	Hold
2002	Municipal general	New Westminster City Council	Independent	3,275	–	7th	–	Lost	n/a
2004	Federal general	Burnaby—New Westminster	New Democratic	14,061	34.58%	1st	+18.44	Won	Gain
2006	Federal general	Burnaby—New Westminster	New Democratic	17,391	38.79%	1st	+4.21	Won	Hold
2008	Federal general	Burnaby—New Westminster	New Democratic	20,145	46.49%	1st	+7.71	Won	Hold
2011	Federal general	Burnaby—New Westminster	New Democratic	22,193	49.67%	1st	+3.18	Won	Hold
2015	Federal general	New Westminster—Burnaby	New Democratic	22,876	43.46%	1st	-8.32	Won	Hold
2019	Federal general	New Westminster—Burnaby	New Democratic	23,437	44.20%	1st	+0.74	Won	Hold
2021	Federal general	New Westminster—Burnaby	New Democratic	24,054	48.77%	1st	+4.57	Won	Hold
2025	Federal general	New Westminster—Burnaby—Maillardville	New Democratic	17,574	31.55%	2nd	-16.43	Lost	Gain

=== Full results ===
2025 Canadian federal election: New Westminster—Burnaby—Maillardville
Party	Candidate	Votes	%	±%	Expenditures
Liberal	Jake Sawatzky	19,547	35.09	+11.65	$58,258.11
New Democratic	Peter Julian	17,574	31.55	–16.43	$98,664.55
Conservative	Indy Panchi	17,507	31.43	+10.41	$76,760.64
Green	Tara Shushtarian	690	1.24	–2.55	$483.84
Independent	Lourence Almonte Singh	385	0.69	–	$20,303.91
Total valid votes/expense limit		55,703	99.41	–	$129,291.88
Total rejected ballots		331	0.59	–	
Turnout		56,034	67.09	–	
Eligible voters		83,525			
Liberal gain from New Democratic		Swing		+14.04	
Note: Lourence Almonte Singh was originally the Conservative nominee, but ran as an independent after his nomination was revoked on April 1, 2025.
Source: Elections Canada

2021 Canadian federal election: New Westminster—Burnaby
Party	Candidate	Votes	%	±%	Expenditures
New Democratic	Peter Julian	24,054	48.77	+4.53	$87,163.56
Liberal	Rozina Jaffer	11,685	23.69	+0.26	$2,870.82
Conservative	Paige Munro	9,710	19.69	–1.91	$22,984.40
Green	David Macdonald	2,035	4.13	–4.14	$957.72
People's	Kevin Heide	1,840	3.73	+2.10	none listed
Total valid votes/expense limit		49,324	99.07	–	$116,281.29
Total rejected ballots		462	0.93	+0.08	
Turnout		49,786	56.89	–4.84	
Eligible voters		87,509			
New Democratic hold		Swing		+2.14	
Source: Elections Canada

2019 Canadian federal election: New Westminster—Burnaby
Party	Candidate	Votes	%	±%	Expenditures
New Democratic	Peter Julian	23,437	44.24	+0.78	$91,491.08
Liberal	Will Davis	12,414	23.43	–5.54	$46,165.54
Conservative	Megan Veck	11,439	21.59	+1.62	$21,181.03
Green	Suzanne de Montigny	4,378	8.26	+3.54	$7,597.20
People's	Hansen Ginn	862	1.63	–	$6,507.07
Libertarian	Neeraj Murarka	307	0.58	–2.02	none listed
Independent	Ahmad Passyar	83	0.16	–	none listed
Marxist–Leninist	Joseph Theriault	57	0.11	–0.17	none listed
Total valid votes/expense limit		52,977	99.15	–	$111,949.69
Total rejected ballots		452	0.85	+0.16	
Turnout		53,429	61.74	–4.20	
Eligible voters		86,544			
New Democratic hold		Swing		+3.16	
Source: Elections Canada

2015 Canadian federal election: New Westminster—Burnaby
Party	Candidate	Votes	%	±%	Expenditures
New Democratic	Peter Julian	22,876	43.46	–8.32	$92,731.71
Liberal	Sasha Ramnarine	15,253	28.97	+20.27	$11,829.89
Conservative	Chloé Ellis	10,512	19.97	–14.79	$16,364.97
Green	Kyle Routledge	2,487	4.72	+0.40	$1,669.47
Libertarian	Rex Brocki	1,368	2.60	–	$30.00
Marxist–Leninist	Joseph Theriault	146	0.28	–	none listed
Total valid votes/expense limit		52,642	99.32	–	$213,160.28
Total rejected ballots		363	0.68		
Turnout		53,005	65.93		
Eligible voters		80,394			
New Democratic notional hold		Swing		–14.30	
Source: Elections Canada

2011 Canadian federal election: Burnaby—New Westminster
Party	Candidate	Votes	%	±%	Expenditures
New Democratic	Peter Julian	22,193	49.67	+3.17	$71,153.20
Conservative	Paul Forseth	16,009	35.83	+5.48	$69,676.43
Liberal	Garth Evans	4,496	10.06	–5.36	$25,287.52
Green	Carrie McLaren	1,731	3.87	–3.21	$1,701.37
Libertarian	Tyler Pierce	160	0.36	–0.07	$344.00
Marxist–Leninist	Joseph Theriault	94	0.21	–0.01	none listed
Total valid votes/expense limit		44,683	99.57	–	$90,151.17
Total rejected ballots		194	0.43	–0.06	
Turnout		44,877	53.25	–1.10	
Eligible voters		84,271			
New Democratic hold		Swing		–1.15	
Source: Elections Canada

2008 Canadian federal election: Burnaby—New Westminster
Party	Candidate	Votes	%	±%	Expenditures
New Democratic	Peter Julian	20,145	46.50	+7.70	$72,142.50
Conservative	Sam Rakhra	13,150	30.35	+2.77	$72,106.12
Liberal	Gerry Lenoski	6,681	15.42	–14.52	$45,119.84
Green	Carrie McLaren	3,067	7.08	+3.39	$7,637.50
Libertarian	Ismet Yetisen	186	0.43	–	none listed
Marxist–Leninist	Joseph Theriault	96	0.22	–	none listed
Total valid votes/expense limit		43,325	99.51	–	$85,024.12
Total rejected ballots		214	0.49	+0.17	
Turnout		43,539	54.35	–5.74	
Eligible voters		80,110			
New Democratic hold		Swing		+2.44	
Source: Elections Canada

2006 Canadian federal election: Burnaby—New Westminster
Party	Candidate	Votes	%	±%	Expenditures
New Democratic	Peter Julian	17,391	38.79	+5.07	$67,743.86
Liberal	Mary Pynenburg	13,420	29.94	–3.00	$74,115.51
Conservative	Marc Dalton	12,364	27.58	–0.77	$52,855.97
Green	Scott Henry Janzen	1,654	3.69	–0.16	$1,149.61
Total valid votes/expense limit		44,829	99.68	–	$77,276.88
Total rejected ballots		144	0.32	–0.20	
Turnout		44,973	60.09	+1.13	
Eligible voters		74,848			
New Democratic hold		Swing		+4.03	
Source: Elections Canada

2004 Canadian federal election: Burnaby—New Westminster
Party	Candidate	Votes	%	±%	Expenditures
New Democratic	Peter Julian	14,061	33.72	–	$51,272.44
Liberal	Mary Pynenburg	13,732	32.93	–	$66,885.20
Conservative	Mike Redmond	11,821	28.35	–	$49,976.95
Green	Revel Kunz	1,606	3.85	–	$173.25
Canadian Action	Dana Green	312	0.75	–	$97.83
Communist	Péter Pál Horváth	166	0.40	–	$389.85
Total valid votes/expense limit		41,698	99.48	–	$73,590.81
Total rejected ballots		217	0.52	–	
Turnout		41,915	58.95	–	
Eligible voters		71,097			
New Democratic notional gain from Conservative		Swing		+9.69	
This riding was created from parts of New Westminster—Coquitlam—Burnaby, Vancouver South—Burnaby, and Burnaby—Douglas, which elected MPs from the Canadian Alliance, Liberal, and New Democratic parties, respectively, in 2000. Changes are based on redistributed results. Conservative change based on the total of Canadian Alliance and Progressive Conservative votes in the 2000 election.
Source: Elections Canada

1989 Quebec general election: Saint-François
Party	Candidate	Votes	%
Liberal	Monique Gagnon-Tremblay	14,961	51.97
Parti Québécois	Réal Rancourt	10,492	36.45
Unity	Richard Evans	1,881	6.53
New Democratic	Peter Julian	884	3.07
Parti 51	France Bougie	568	1.97
Total valid votes		28,786	96.32
Total rejected ballots		1,099	3.68
Turnout		29,885	74.98
Electors on the lists		39,856	–

2002 New Westminster municipal election: City Council Six to be elected
Candidate	Votes	Elected
Casey Cook	4848	✓
Jerry Dobrovolny	4626	✓
Chuck Puchmayr	4430	✓
Bob Osterman	3875	✓
Calvin Donnelly	3646	✓
Lorrie Williams	3349	✓
Peter Julian	3275	
Kimiko Karpoff	2918	
Betty McIntosh	2723	
Carol Cheremkora	2634	
Charmaine Murray	1938	
Shane Polak	1588	
Fil Apolinario	1536	
Hilda Bechler	1298	
Wally Walia	1266	
Rhoda Beka-Kaellis	1257	
Shea Campbell	1250	
Lori Underwood	1021	
Ted Edwards	1015	
Gordon Cooper	872	
Ron B. Gordon	772	
