= Jake Sawatzky =

Canadian politician (born 2000)

Jake Sawatzky MP

Member of Parliament for New Westminster—Burnaby—Maillardville
- Incumbent
- Assumed office April 28, 2025
- Preceded by: Peter Julian

Personal details
- Born: 2000 (age 25–26) Surrey, British Columbia, Canada
- Party: Liberal
- Education: University of British Columbia (BSc); Trinity Western University
- Website: jakesawatzky.liberal.ca

Jake Sawatzky (born 2000) is a Canadian politician who was elected as the member of Parliament for New Westminster—Burnaby—Maillardville in the 2025 Canadian federal election as a member of the Liberal Party of Canada.

== Background ==
Sawatzky was born in 2000 in Surrey, British Columbia. He was named after his grandfather, Jacob Sawatzky, a Mennonite refugee who fled Stalinist Ukraine and later became a physics teacher in Canada. Sawatzky earned a bachelor of science in neuroscience from the University of British Columbia (UBC) in 2024. During the final year of his studies, he ran unsuccessfully for the role vice president external of UBC's Alma Mater Society. While at UBC, Sawatzky was also a member of the Beta Theta Pi fraternity.

Sawatzky was pursuing a master's degree in counselling psychology at Trinity Western University at the time of his election.

At the time of the 2025 Canadian federal election, he lived in White Rock, British Columbia.

== Political career ==
In the 2025 federal election, Sawatzky ran as the Liberal candidate for the riding of New Westminster—Burnaby—Maillardville. He won the seat, unseating longtime NDP member of Parliament (MP) Peter Julian. Alongside Fares Al Soud, Tatiana Auguste, and Amandeep Sodhi, Sawatzky is one of the first four Canadian MPs born in the 21st century.

== Philanthropy ==
Sawatzky is the president of Drop the Puck for Mental Health, an annual hockey event that raises funds for the Canadian Mental Health Association. He also co-founded We Outside, a concert booking agency.

== Electoral record ==
2025 Canadian federal election: New Westminster—Burnaby—Maillardville
Party	Candidate	Votes	%	±%	Expenditures
Liberal	Jake Sawatzky	19,547	35.09	+11.65	$58,258.11
New Democratic	Peter Julian	17,574	31.55	–16.43	$98,664.55
Conservative	Indy Panchi	17,507	31.43	+10.41	$76,760.64
Green	Tara Shushtarian	690	1.24	–2.55	$483.84
Independent	Lourence Almonte Singh	385	0.69	–	$20,303.91
Total valid votes/expense limit		55,703	99.41	–	$129,291.88
Total rejected ballots		331	0.59	–	
Turnout		56,034	67.09	–	
Eligible voters		83,525			
Liberal gain from New Democratic		Swing		+14.04	
Note: Lourence Almonte Singh was originally the Conservative nominee, but ran as an independent after his nomination was revoked on April 1, 2025.
Source: Elections Canada
