= Burnaby—New Westminster (federal electoral district) =

Former federal electoral district in British Columbia, Canada

Coordinates: 49.2134°N 122.9472°W

British Columbia electoral district
- Burnaby—New Westminster shown in the Lower Mainland

Defunct federal electoral district
- Legislature: House of Commons
- District created: 2003
- District abolished: 2013
- First contested: 2004
- Last contested: 2011
- District webpage: profile, map

Demographics
- Population (2011): 131,917
- Electors (2011): 80,110
- Area (km²): 40.69
- Census division: Metro Vancouver
- Census subdivision(s): Burnaby, New Westminster

Burnaby—New Westminster was a federal electoral district in British Columbia, Canada, that was represented in the House of Commons of Canada from 2004 to 2015.

== Demographics ==
(According to the 2001 Canadian census)

Ethnic groups: 50.7% White, 20.2% Chinese, 10.6% South Asian, 4.3% Filipino, 2.9% Korean, 2.0% Aboriginal, 1.7% Latin American, 1.7% Black, 1.4% Japanese, 1.2% Southeast Asian
Languages: 48.7% English, 1.0% French, 48.0% Other, 2.2% Multiple languages
Religions: 21.1% Protestant, 19.1% Catholic, 6.1% Sikh, 4.6% Muslim, 4.4% Buddhist, 2.9% Christian Orthodox, 1.7% Hindu, 5.7% Other Christian, 33.5% No religious affiliation
Average income: $27,356

== Geography ==
The riding includes all of the city of New Westminster west of 8th Street and all of the city of Burnaby south of the following line: Kingsway to Sussex Avenue to Grange Street to Dover Street to Oakland Street to Sperling Avenue to the Trans-Canada Highway.

== History ==
The riding was created in 2003 from parts of New Westminster—Coquitlam—Burnaby, Vancouver South—Burnaby, and Burnaby—Douglas.

According to the electoral boundaries set out by the 2012 Federal Electoral Boundaries Commission for British Columbia, the riding was dissolved, with various parts joining the new ridings of Burnaby South, New Westminster—Burnaby and Steveston—Richmond East.

== Members of Parliament ==
Parliament	Years	Member	Party
Riding created from New Westminster—Coquitlam—Burnaby, Vancouver South—Burnaby and Burnaby—Douglas
38th	2004–2006	Peter Julian	New Democratic
39th	2006–2008	Peter Julian	New Democratic
40th	2008–2011	Peter Julian	New Democratic
41st	2011–2015	Peter Julian	New Democratic
Riding dissolved into Burnaby South, and New Westminster—Burnaby

== Election results ==
2011 Canadian federal election
Party	Candidate	Votes	%	±%	Expenditures
New Democratic	Peter Julian	22,193	49.67	+3.17	$71,153.20
Conservative	Paul Forseth	16,009	35.83	+5.48	$69,676.43
Liberal	Garth Evans	4,496	10.06	–5.36	$25,287.52
Green	Carrie McLaren	1,731	3.87	–3.21	$1,701.37
Libertarian	Tyler Pierce	160	0.36	–0.07	$344.00
Marxist–Leninist	Joseph Theriault	94	0.21	–0.01	none listed
Total valid votes/expense limit		44,683	99.57	–	$90,151.17
Total rejected ballots		194	0.43	–0.06	
Turnout		44,877	53.25	–1.10	
Eligible voters		84,271			
New Democratic hold		Swing		–1.15	
Source: Elections Canada

2008 Canadian federal election
Party	Candidate	Votes	%	±%	Expenditures
New Democratic	Peter Julian	20,145	46.50	+7.70	$72,142.50
Conservative	Sam Rakhra	13,150	30.35	+2.77	$72,106.12
Liberal	Gerry Lenoski	6,681	15.42	–14.52	$45,119.84
Green	Carrie McLaren	3,067	7.08	+3.39	$7,637.50
Libertarian	Ismet Yetisen	186	0.43	–	none listed
Marxist–Leninist	Joseph Theriault	96	0.22	–	none listed
Total valid votes/expense limit		43,325	99.51	–	$85,024.12
Total rejected ballots		214	0.49	+0.17	
Turnout		43,539	54.35	–5.74	
Eligible voters		80,110			
New Democratic hold		Swing		+2.44	
Source: Elections Canada

2006 Canadian federal election
Party	Candidate	Votes	%	±%	Expenditures
New Democratic	Peter Julian	17,391	38.79	+5.07	$67,743.86
Liberal	Mary Pynenburg	13,420	29.94	–3.00	$74,115.51
Conservative	Marc Dalton	12,364	27.58	–0.77	$52,855.97
Green	Scott Henry Janzen	1,654	3.69	–0.16	$1,149.61
Total valid votes/expense limit		44,829	99.68	–	$77,276.88
Total rejected ballots		144	0.32	–0.20	
Turnout		44,973	60.09	+1.13	
Eligible voters		74,848			
New Democratic hold		Swing		+4.03	
Source: Elections Canada

2004 Canadian federal election
Party	Candidate	Votes	%	±%	Expenditures
New Democratic	Peter Julian	14,061	33.72	–	$51,272.44
Liberal	Mary Pynenburg	13,732	32.93	–	$66,885.20
Conservative	Mike Redmond	11,821	28.35	–	$49,976.95
Green	Revel Kunz	1,606	3.85	–	$173.25
Canadian Action	Dana Green	312	0.75	–	$97.83
Communist	Péter Pál Horváth	166	0.40	–	$389.85
Total valid votes/expense limit		41,698	99.48	–	$73,590.81
Total rejected ballots		217	0.52	–	
Turnout		41,915	58.95	–	
Eligible voters		71,097			
New Democratic notional gain from Conservative		Swing		+9.69	
This riding was created from parts of New Westminster—Coquitlam—Burnaby, Vancouver South—Burnaby, and Burnaby—Douglas, which elected MPs from the Canadian Alliance, Liberal, and New Democratic parties, respectively, in 2000. Changes are based on redistributed results. Conservative change based on the total of Canadian Alliance and Progressive Conservative votes in the 2000 election.
Source: Elections Canada

== See also ==
- List of Canadian electoral districts
- Historical federal electoral districts of Canada
