= Kennedy Stewart (Canadian politician) =

Canadian politician and academic

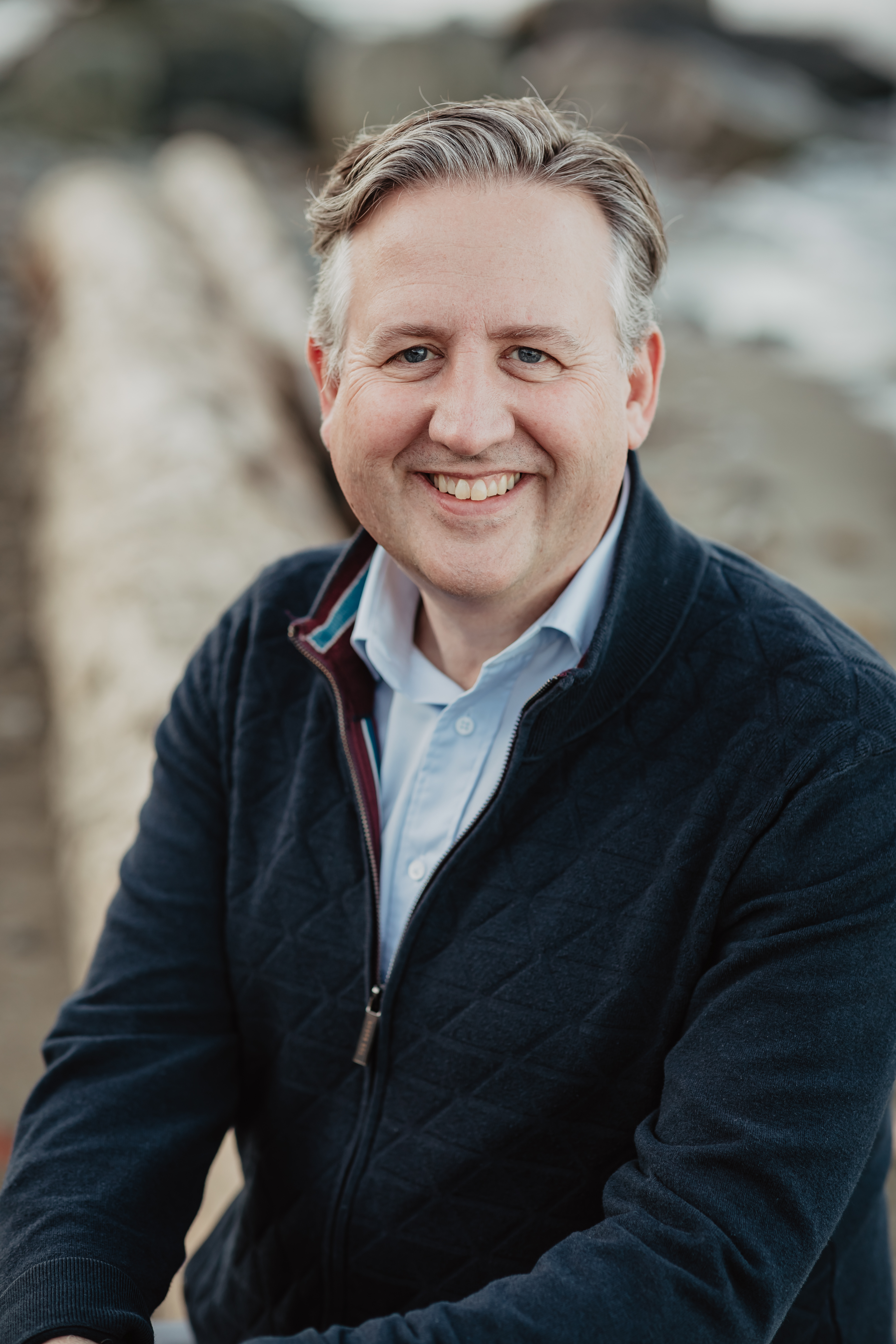
- Stewart in 2019

40th Mayor of Vancouver
- In office November 5, 2018 – November 7, 2022
- Preceded by: Gregor Robertson
- Succeeded by: Ken Sim

Member of Parliament for Burnaby South Burnaby—Douglas (2011–2015)
- In office May 2, 2011 – September 14, 2018
- Preceded by: Bill Siksay
- Succeeded by: Jagmeet Singh

Personal details
- Born: Edward Charles Kennedy Stewart; November 8, 1966 (age 59) Halifax, Nova Scotia, Canada
- Party: Forward Together (municipal)
- Other political affiliations: New Democratic (federal); Independent (municipal, 2018–2022)
- Spouse: Jeanette Ashe
- Education: Acadia University; Simon Fraser University; London School of Economics
- Occupation: Academic administrator; politician
- Profession: Politician; academic

Edward Charles Kennedy Stewart (born November 8, 1966) is a Canadian academic administrator and politician who served as the 40th mayor of Vancouver from 2018 to 2022. He previously was the member of Parliament (MP) for the riding of Burnaby—Douglas (2011–2015) and Burnaby South (2015–2018), serving in the House of Commons as a member of the New Democratic Party (NDP) caucus.

In May 2018, Stewart announced his pending resignation from Parliament, in order to seek election as mayor of Vancouver as an independent candidate. In August 2018, he publicly released his letter to the Speaker of House, Geoff Regan, confirming his resignation, effective September 14, 2018. During the 2018 Vancouver municipal election, Stewart was declared the winner of the mayoral race by a margin of fewer than 1,000 votes over Ken Sim, the Non-Partisan Association (NPA) candidate. In his bid for re-election in 2022, Stewart was defeated by Sim by more than 35,000 votes. Stewart is the first incumbent mayor to be defeated since 1980, when mayor Jack Volrich was upset by challenger Mike Harcourt.

== Early life and career ==
Stewart was born in Halifax, Nova Scotia, in 1966 and raised in Wolfville, Nova Scotia. He earned his bachelor's degree in history from Acadia University.

After moving to Burnaby, British Columbia, in 1988, Stewart played bass guitar for the pop music band State of Mind. In 1991, his band won three West Coast Music Awards.

In 1995, Stewart received his master's degree in political science from Simon Fraser University, and a PhD in government from the London School of Economics in 2003.

As an academic, Stewart has published research on citizen participation, democratic reform, and municipal governance. His books include Local Government in Canada and Decrim: How We Decriminalized Drugs in British Columbia.

While serving as mayor, Stewart was on leave from teaching at the Simon Fraser University School of Public Policy. In January 2023, Stewart returned to SFU as director of the Centre for Public Policy Research. Stewart's wife, Jeanette Ashe, also teaches politics, at Douglas College.

== Federal politics ==
On March 28, 2004, Stewart won the nomination for the New Democratic Party for the federal riding of Vancouver Centre in a close three-way race. Although he lost in the 2004 general election by 4,230 votes, he increased the NDP's vote share in Vancouver Centre by 20 percentage points compared to the 2000 election.

On February 25, 2011, Stewart secured the NDP nomination for the federal riding of Burnaby—Douglas in a first ballot victory. He won the riding in the 2011 general election with 44 percent of the vote, and was re-elected with 35 percent of the vote in 2015.

=== 41st Parliament ===
In 2012, NDP Leader Thomas Mulcair appointed Stewart as official opposition critic for science and technology and as a member of the standing committee on industry, science and technology. In Parliament, he opposed the Conservative government's elimination of the long-form census and funding cuts for basic scientific research. He tabled legislation (Motion 453) to protect scientific integrity in government departments and end the muzzling of federal scientists.

In 2013, Stewart introduced Bill C-558, The Parliamentary Science Officer Act. Following the elimination of Canada's National Science Advisor in 2008, the bill aimed to create an independent science watchdog tasked with providing Parliament with sound scientific information and ensuring decisions are informed by the best available evidence. Bill C-558 was endorsed by Evidence for Democracy, the Canadian Association of University Teachers, the Professional Institute of the Public Service of Canada, and the Centre for Science in the Public Interest.

Stewart put forward a proposal (Motion 428) for the House of Commons to begin accepting petitions electronically as a means to engage more Canadians in the democratic process. It further proposed that short debates be triggered in Parliament if an online petition receives a significant number of signatures and is sponsored by at least five MPs. Stewart's proposal was endorsed by Ed Broadbent, Preston Manning, and a number of civil society groups. Being opposed by Prime Minister Stephen Harper and his Conservative cabinet, Motion 428 passed the House of Commons by only two votes (142-140) on January 29, 2014. It was widely viewed as a "surprise win" for the official opposition.

Stewart held public consultations with Burnaby residents on Kinder Morgan's proposal to build a new export-only, bitumen-based crude oil pipeline through his riding. Stewart became a vocal opponent of the project, citing community concerns over property expropriation, decreasing housing values, increased tanker traffic in the Burrard Inlet, the use of temporary foreign workers, and the lack of benefits for British Columbia. His constituency office helped local residents sign-up to participate in the National Energy Board's review of the project. In 2013, the Burnaby Newsleader named Stewart their "Newsmaker of the Year" for his community work on the Kinder Morgan pipeline.

Stewart is an advocate for social housing and federal action to address BC's housing crisis. In 2014, he put forward a BC-specific affordable housing strategy (Motion 547) to recognize housing as a fundamental right, expand public investments in housing co-ops, maintain rent subsidies for low-income families, set targets for reducing and ending homelessness, and study the impact of investor speculation and housing vacancies on real estate prices. His motion was endorsed by the City of Burnaby.

=== 42nd Parliament ===
He was re-elected in the new riding of Burnaby South in the 2015 election.

Following the election, Stewart was re-appointed by Tom Mulcair as NDP critic for science.

On December 4, 2015, Parliament launched its new website for accepting electronic petitions from Canadians. Under the new system, initiated by Stewart's motion that passed before the election, the federal government has to respond within 45 days to online petitions if they are sponsored by one member of Parliament and receive at least 500 signatures. Stewart sponsored the first official e-petition in Canada on behalf of two local constituents.

On December 9, 2015, Stewart was elected by his caucus colleagues as chair of the NDP's British Columbia caucus. In a statement, he vowed to support the NDP's newly elected MPs getting established in Parliament, strengthen engagement with stakeholders and constituents across the province, and hold the new Liberal government accountable for its election promises on affordable housing and pipeline reviews.

=== 2018 contempt of court ===
On March 23, 2018, Stewart was arrested for civil contempt during a demonstration against the Kinder Morgan pipeline. Other members of the demonstration, including fellow member of Parliament Elizabeth May, were also arrested concerning the same incident. They were accused of violating a court order requiring those demonstrating to stay five metres back from company work sites, when they allegedly blocked the roadway. On April 9, 2018, Justice Kenneth Affleck of the British Columbia Supreme Court recommended that Stewart and the others arrested should be charged with criminal contempt in relation to the alleged incident. On April 16, 2018, it was reported that special prosecutors would be overseeing the charges against Stewart and May. On May 14, 2018, Stewart pleaded guilty to criminal contempt of court for his actions during the protest and was fined $500. As criminal contempt is a common law—not a Criminal Code—offence, Stewart does not have a criminal record.

== Vancouver municipal politics ==
Stewart announced on May 10, 2018, that he would be resigning from Parliament in order to run to be the mayor of Vancouver in the 2018 Vancouver municipal election. His resignation was effective September 14, 2018 (the last day he can file his paperwork to officially enter the mayoral race). Until his resignation became official on September 14, Stewart told CBC News he intended to continue to campaign for mayor and collect his MP salary, saying that there was "overlap" between both roles. On May 24, 2018, Stewart announced, if elected mayor, he would create a lobbyist registry and new conflict-of-interest rules for City Hall.

Stewart won the mayoral election, with a margin of fewer than 1000 votes separating him from NPA candidate Ken Sim. Stewart was the first mayor of Vancouver to be unaffiliated with a municipal political party in over 30 years, and remained an independent until forming Forward Together.

=== Mayoral term ===
==== Housing ====
During the 2018 campaign, Stewart promised to address the housing crisis by approving the construction of more rental homes, co-ops, and market housing aimed at middle-income workers and families. He also promised to renew city-held leases to protect the city's current 6000 cooperative housing units. Since becoming mayor, Stewart has supported the Moderate Income Rental Housing Pilot Project (MIRHPP), which allows developers of secured market rental housing to add more units to their developments than the current zoning would allow as long as 20 percent of the units are permanently reserved for moderate income households.

In August 2019, the federal Minister of Families, Children and Social Development, Jean-Yves Duclos, and Stewart announced a partnership where the federal government would provide $184 million in low-interest loans and grants to fund the construction of 1,100 units of affordable housing on City-owned land.

In November 2019, Stewart – along with Vancouver City Council – voted to increase the Empty Homes Tax rate from 1% to 1.25% for the 2020 fiscal year and approved future increases in 0.25% increments in 2021 and 2022.

==== Opioid crisis ====
As promised during the 2018 campaign, Stewart created a Mayor’s Overdose Emergency Task Force to address the opioid crisis in Vancouver. The task force produced 31 recommendations, which were unanimously approved by Council for implementation in December 2018. An additional eight recommendations were unanimously approved in July 2019, as well as a Safe Supply Statement advocating for a regulated, safe supply of drugs to prevent deaths from drug poisoning.

==== Transportation ====
During the 2018 campaign, Stewart expressed his support for extending the planned Broadway extension of the SkyTrain's Millennium Line to Arbutus all the way to the University of British Columbia (UBC). He said that 2020 is a "critical year" to secure federal and provincial funding for the project and, on January 29, 2020, signed a memorandum of understanding with the Musqueam Indian Band, the Squamish Nation, the Tsleil-Waututh Nation and UBC, agreeing to work with the other signatories to seek funding to build SkyTrain to UBC.

==== Re-election attempt ====
In November 2019, Stewart announced that he plans to run for re-election in the 2022 municipal elections. He ran under the Forward Together party. He was defeated by Ken Sim of ABC Vancouver in the election by a margin of 35,000 votes.

=== Post-mayoral activities ===
After the 2022 municipal election, Stewart was appointed as director of Simon Fraser University's Centre for Public Policy Research.

In May 2023, Stewart commented on his successor's administration, calling Sim's clearing of the Hastings Street encampment "callous". Stewart also hinted that he would be initiating a legal challenge of Vancouver's at-large electoral system, in which councillors are elected to represent the whole city.

== Electoral record ==
2022 Vancouver municipal election: Mayor
Party	Candidate	Votes	%	Elected
ABC Vancouver	Ken Sim	85,732	50.96	✓
Forward Together	Kennedy Stewart (incumbent)	49,593	29.48	
TEAM	Colleen Hardwick	16,769	9.97	
Progress Vancouver	Mark Marissen	5,830	3.47	
NPA	Fred Harding	3,905	2.32	
Independent	Leona Brown	1,519	0.9	
Independent	Ping Chan	1,154	0.69	
Independent	Françoise Raunet	1,116	0.66	
Independent	Satwant Shottha	994	0.59	
Independent	Imtiaz Popat	411	0.24	
Independent	Lewis Villegas	363	0.22	
Independent	Mike Hansen	314	0.19	
Independent	Gölök Buday	195	0.12	
Independent	Ryan Charmley	183	0.11	
Independent	Dante Teti	142	0.08	
ABC Vancouver gain from Forward Together		Swing		+11.02 (Note: Calculated using Ken Sim's and Kennedy Stewart's 2018 results.)
Source: City of Vancouver

2018 Vancouver municipal election: Mayor
Party	Candidate	Votes	%	Elected
Independent	Kennedy Stewart	49,705	28.71	✓
NPA	Ken Sim	48,748	28.16	
Independent	Shauna Sylvester	35,457	20.48	
Coalition Vancouver	Wai Young	11,872	6.86	
Yes Vancouver	Hector Bremner	9,924	5.73	
Vancouver 1st	Fred Harding	5,640	3.26	
ProVancouver	David Chen	3,573	2.06	
Independent	Sean Cassidy	1,536	0.89	
IDEA Vancouver	Connie Fogal	1,435	0.83	
Independent	Mike Hansen	951	0.55	
Independent	Jason Lamarche	695	0.40	
Independent	Rollergirl	686	0.40	
Independent	Ping Chan	653	0.38	
Independent	John Yano	510	0.29	
Independent	Tim Ly	349	0.20	
Independent	Sophia C. Kaiser	336	0.19	
Independent	Satwant K. Shottha	331	0.19	
Independent	Lawrence Massey	233	0.13	
Independent	Katy Le Rougetel	181	0.10	
Independent	Gölök Z. Buday	178	0.10	
Independent	Maynard Aubichon	139	0.08	

2015 Canadian federal election: Burnaby South
Party	Candidate	Votes	%	±%	Expenditures
New Democratic	Kennedy Stewart	16,094	35.07	–8.93	$177,796.68
Liberal	Adam Pankratz	15,547	33.88	+22.16	$33,613.38
Conservative	Grace Seear	12,441	27.11	–12.51	$83,392.49
Green	Wyatt Tessari	1,306	2.85	–0.76	$790.18
Libertarian	Liz Jaluague	499	1.09	–	none listed
Total valid votes/expense limit		45,887	99.40	–	$207,659.75
Total rejected ballots		275	0.60	–	
Turnout		46,162	60.78	–	
Eligible voters		75,950			
New Democratic hold		Swing		–15.55	
Source: Elections Canada

2011 Canadian federal election: Burnaby—Douglas
Party	Candidate	Votes	%	±%	Expenditures
New Democratic	Kennedy Stewart	20,943	43.00	+5.06	$77,861.67
Conservative	Ronald Leung	19,932	40.92	+4.67	$89,756.16
Liberal	Ken Low	5,451	11.19	–8.22	$52,769.12
Green	Adrianne Merlo	1,754	3.60	–2.37	$1,312.73
Libertarian	Lewis Clarke Dahlby	420	0.86	–	none listed
Communist	George Gidora	153	0.31	–0.12	$306.07
Marxist–Leninist	Brian Sproule	57	0.12	–	none listed
Total valid votes/expense limit		48,710	99.55	–	$90,613.21
Total rejected ballots		220	0.45	+0.01	
Turnout		48,930	57.63	–0.08	
Eligible voters		84,911			
New Democratic hold		Swing		+4.86	
Source: Elections Canada

2004 Canadian federal election: Vancouver Centre
Party	Candidate	Votes	%	±%	Expenditures
Liberal	Hedy Fry	21,280	40.31	–1.99	$66,619.64
New Democratic	Kennedy Stewart	17,050	32.30	+20.25	$55,675.28
Conservative	Gary Mitchell	10,139	19.21	–18.70	$73,303.46
Green	Robbie Mattu	3,580	6.78	+2.84	$2,444.22
Libertarian	John Clarke	304	0.58	–	$60.00
Christian Heritage	Joe Pal	243	0.46	–	$1,877.46
Canadian Action	Alexander Frei	101	0.19	–1.09	none listed
Communist	Kimball Cariou	96	0.18	+0.01	$389.84
Total valid votes/expense limit		52,793	99.57	–	$81,169.20
Total rejected ballots		226	0.43	–0.05	
Turnout		53,019	61.47	+0.97	
Eligible voters		86,246			
Liberal hold		Swing		–11.12	
Change for the Conservatives is based on the combined totals of the Canadian Alliance and the Progressive Conservatives.
Source: Elections Canada
