= New Westminster—Burnaby—Maillardville =

Federal electoral district in British Columbia, Canada

British Columbia electoral district
- Interactive map of riding boundaries from the 2025 federal election

Federal electoral district
- Legislature: House of Commons
MP
Jake Sawatzky
Liberal
- District created: 1988, 2013
- First contested: 1988, 2015
- Last contested: 2025
- District webpage: profile, map

Demographics
- Population (2016): 115,340
- Electors (2019): 85,807
- Area (km²): 29
- Pop. density (per km²): 3,977.2
- Census division: Metro Vancouver
- Census subdivision(s): Burnaby (part), Coquitlam (part), New Westminster

New Westminster—Burnaby—Maillardville is a federal electoral district in British Columbia, Canada, that was represented in the House of Commons of Canada from 1988 to 1997 and since 2015. Until the call of the 2025 Canadian federal election, it was known as New Westminster—Burnaby.

== History ==
The 1988–1997 edition of this riding was created in 1987 from parts of Burnaby and New Westminster—Coquitlam ridings. The riding consisted of the City of New Westminster and the southern part of the District Municipality of Burnaby. It was abolished in 1996 when it was merged into New Westminster—Coquitlam—Burnaby and Vancouver South—Burnaby.

The riding was recreated following the 2012 federal electoral boundaries redistribution and was legally defined in the 2013 representation order. It was created from parts of Burnaby—New Westminster and New Westminster—Coquitlam. Its boundaries were legally defined in the 2013 representation order, which came into effect upon the call of the 42nd Canadian federal election, scheduled for October 2015.

Under the 2022 Canadian federal electoral redistribution the riding was renamed New Westminster—Burnaby—Maillardville. The seat gained much of the Maillardville area from Port Moody—Coquitlam and lost all of its territory in Burnaby west of Canada Way to either Burnaby Central or Vancouver Fraserview—South Burnaby.

=== Historical boundaries ===
1987 representation order

1996 representation order (as New Westminster—Coquitlam—Burnaby)

2003 representation order (as New Westminster—Coquitlam)

2013 representation order

2023 representation order (as New Westminster—Burnaby—Maillardville)

== Demographics ==
Panethnic groups in New Westminster—Burnaby (2011−2021)
Panethnic group	2021		2016		2011	
Panethnic group	Pop.	%	Pop.	%	Pop.	%
European (Note: Statistic includes all persons that did not make up part of a visible minority or an indigenous identity.)	50,165	40.74%	52,345	46.25%	53,995	50.57%
East Asian (Note: Statistic includes total responses of "Chinese", "Korean", and "Japanese" under visible minority section on census.)	25,840	20.98%	23,265	20.55%	19,605	18.36%
South Asian	13,970	11.34%	11,635	10.28%	11,360	10.64%
Southeast Asian (Note: Statistic includes total responses of "Filipino" and "Southeast Asian" under visible minority section on census.)	13,625	11.06%	11,650	10.29%	10,340	9.68%
African	4,595	3.73%	3,170	2.8%	2,415	2.26%
Middle Eastern (Note: Statistic includes total responses of "West Asian" and "Arab" under visible minority section on census.)	4,290	3.48%	3,190	2.82%	2,880	2.7%
Latin American	3,590	2.92%	2,465	2.18%	1,895	1.77%
Indigenous	3,120	2.53%	3,335	2.95%	2,960	2.77%
Other (Note: Statistic includes total responses of "Visible minority, n.i.e." and "Multiple visible minorities" under visible minority section on census.)	3,940	3.2%	2,140	1.89%	1,330	1.25%
Total responses	123,140	98.31%	113,190	98.14%	106,780	98.28%
Total population	125,253	100%	115,340	100%	108,652	100%
Notes: Totals greater than 100% due to multiple origin responses. Demographics based on 2013 Representation Order riding boundaries.

== Members of Parliament ==
Parliament	Years	Member	Party
New Westminster—Burnaby
Riding created from Burnaby and New Westminster—Coquitlam
34th	1988–1993	Dawn Black	New Democratic
35th	1993–1997	Paul Forseth	Reform
Riding dissolved into New Westminster—Coquitlam—Burnaby, Vancouver South—Burnaby and Burnaby—Douglas
Riding re-created from Burnaby—New Westminster and New Westminster—Coquitlam
42nd	2015–2019	Peter Julian	New Democratic
43rd	2019–2021	Peter Julian	New Democratic
44th	2021–2025	Peter Julian	New Democratic
New Westminster—Burnaby—Maillardville
45th	2025–present	Jake Sawatzky	Liberal

== Election results ==
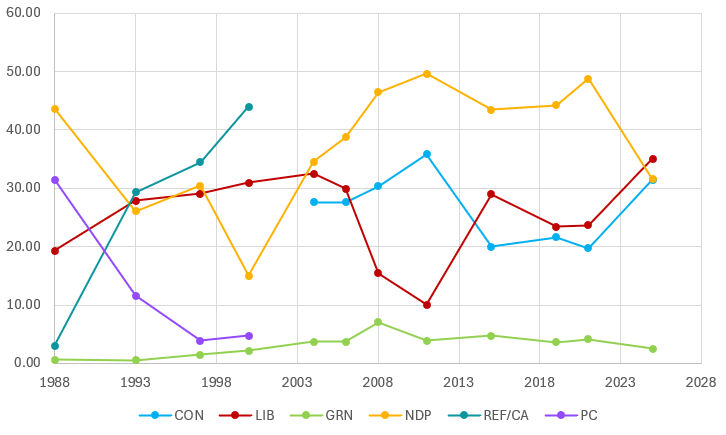
Popular vote by party in the riding of: New Westminster—Burnaby (1988–1997) New Westminster—Coquitlam—Burnaby (1997–2004) Burnaby—New Westminster (2004–2015) New Westminster—Burnaby (2015–2025) New Westminster—Burnaby—Maillardville (since 2025)

=== New Westminster—Burnaby—Maillardville, since 2025 ===
2025 Canadian federal election
Party	Candidate	Votes	%	±%	Expenditures
Liberal	Jake Sawatzky	19,547	35.09	+11.65	$58,258.11
New Democratic	Peter Julian	17,574	31.55	–16.43	$98,664.55
Conservative	Indy Panchi	17,507	31.43	+10.41	$76,760.64
Green	Tara Shushtarian	690	1.24	–2.55	$483.84
Independent	Lourence Almonte Singh	385	0.69	–	$20,303.91
Total valid votes/expense limit		55,703	99.41	–	$129,291.88
Total rejected ballots		331	0.59	–	
Turnout		56,034	67.09	–	
Eligible voters		83,525			
Liberal gain from New Democratic		Swing		+14.04	
Note: Lourence Almonte Singh was originally the Conservative nominee, but ran as an independent after his nomination was revoked on April 1, 2025.
Source: Elections Canada

2021 federal election redistributed results
Party	Vote	%
New Democratic	22,808	47.98
Liberal	11,141	23.44
Conservative	9,990	21.02
Green	1,803	3.79
People's	1,777	3.74
Others	13	0.03

=== New Westminster—Burnaby, 2015–2025 ===
Graph of election results in New Westminster—Burnaby (minor parties that never got 2% of the vote or didn't run consistently are omitted)

2021 Canadian federal election: New Westminster—Burnaby
Party	Candidate	Votes	%	±%	Expenditures
New Democratic	Peter Julian	24,054	48.77	+4.53	$87,163.56
Liberal	Rozina Jaffer	11,685	23.69	+0.26	$2,870.82
Conservative	Paige Munro	9,710	19.69	–1.91	$22,984.40
Green	David Macdonald	2,035	4.13	–4.14	$957.72
People's	Kevin Heide	1,840	3.73	+2.10	none listed
Total valid votes/expense limit		49,324	99.07	–	$116,281.29
Total rejected ballots		462	0.93	+0.08	
Turnout		49,786	56.89	–4.84	
Eligible voters		87,509			
New Democratic hold		Swing		+2.14	
Source: Elections Canada

2019 Canadian federal election: New Westminster—Burnaby
Party	Candidate	Votes	%	±%	Expenditures
New Democratic	Peter Julian	23,437	44.24	+0.78	$91,491.08
Liberal	Will Davis	12,414	23.43	–5.54	$46,165.54
Conservative	Megan Veck	11,439	21.59	+1.62	$21,181.03
Green	Suzanne de Montigny	4,378	8.26	+3.54	$7,597.20
People's	Hansen Ginn	862	1.63	–	$6,507.07
Libertarian	Neeraj Murarka	307	0.58	–2.02	none listed
Independent	Ahmad Passyar	83	0.16	–	none listed
Marxist–Leninist	Joseph Theriault	57	0.11	–0.17	none listed
Total valid votes/expense limit		52,977	99.15	–	$111,949.69
Total rejected ballots		452	0.85	+0.16	
Turnout		53,429	61.74	–4.20	
Eligible voters		86,544			
New Democratic hold		Swing		+3.16	
Source: Elections Canada

2015 Canadian federal election: New Westminster—Burnaby
Party	Candidate	Votes	%	±%	Expenditures
New Democratic	Peter Julian	22,876	43.46	–8.32	$92,731.71
Liberal	Sasha Ramnarine	15,253	28.97	+20.27	$11,829.89
Conservative	Chloé Ellis	10,512	19.97	–14.79	$16,364.97
Green	Kyle Routledge	2,487	4.72	+0.40	$1,669.47
Libertarian	Rex Brocki	1,368	2.60	–	$30.00
Marxist–Leninist	Joseph Theriault	146	0.28	–	none listed
Total valid votes/expense limit		52,642	99.32	–	$213,160.28
Total rejected ballots		363	0.68		
Turnout		53,005	65.93		
Eligible voters		80,394			
New Democratic notional hold		Swing		–14.30	
Source: Elections Canada

2011 federal election redistributed results
Party	Vote	%
New Democratic	21,200	51.78
Conservative	14,230	34.75
Liberal	3,563	8.70
Green	1,772	4.33
Others	179	0.44

=== New Westminster—Burnaby, 1988–1997 ===
Graph of election results in New Westminster—Burnaby (minor parties that never got 2% of the vote or didn't run consistently are omitted)

1993 Canadian federal election: New Westminster—Burnaby
Party	Candidate	Votes	%	±%
Reform	Paul Forseth	16,262	29.33	+26.32
Liberal	Leanore Copeland	15,448	27.87	+8.60
New Democratic	Dawn Black	14,441	26.05	–17.57
Progressive Conservative	Neil MacKay	6,419	11.58	–19.93
National	P. Jeffery Jewell	1,766	3.19	–
Natural Law	Carolyn Grayson	371	0.67	–
Green	Todd E. Romaine	314	0.57	–0.01
Libertarian	Robert Fong	273	0.49	–0.06
Independent	Jess P. Lee	73	0.13	–
Commonwealth of Canada	Geoff Dakin	71	0.13	–
Total valid votes		55,438	99.36	
Total rejected ballots		359	0.64	+0.28
Turnout		55,797	63.27	–13.63
Eligible voters		88,192		
Reform gain from New Democratic		Swing		–
Source: Elections Canada

1988 Canadian federal election: New Westminster—Burnaby
Party	Candidate	Votes	%
New Democratic	Dawn Black	24,933	43.62
Progressive Conservative	Marie Taylor	18,007	31.50
Liberal	Carlos Brito	11,013	19.27
Reform	Bill Anderson	1,722	3.01
Social Credit	Randall Rush	718	1.26
Green	Richard Bidwell	332	0.58
Libertarian	Paul A. Geddes	316	0.55
Communist	Elsie Dean	116	0.20
Total valid votes		57,157	99.63
Total rejected ballots		210	0.37
Turnout		57,367	76.90
Eligible voters		74,598	
This riding was created from parts of Burnaby and New Westminster—Coquitlam, both of which elected a New Democrat in the last election.
Source: Elections Canada

== See also ==
- List of Canadian electoral districts
- Historical federal electoral districts of Canada
