= Vancouver South—Burnaby =

Former federal electoral district in British Columbia, Canada

British Columbia electoral district

Defunct federal electoral district
- Legislature: House of Commons
- District created: 1996
- District abolished: 2003
- First contested: 1997
- Last contested: 2000

Vancouver South was a federal electoral district in British Columbia, Canada, that was represented in the House of Commons of Canada from 1997 to 2004.

== Demographics ==
Population, 2001	113,063
Electors	73,738
Area (km^{2})	
Population density (people per km^{2})	

== Geography ==
It comprised the southeastern portion of the city of Vancouver and the southwestern portion of the neighbouring city of Burnaby.

== History ==
This riding was created in 1996 from parts of Vancouver South and New Westminster—Burnaby ridings. It was only contested in two elections. It was abolished in 2003 and used to re-create Vancouver South and to help create Burnaby—New Westminster. A small portion went to Burnaby—Douglas.

== Member of Parliament ==
Parliament	Years	Member	Party
Riding created from Vancouver South and New Westminster—Burnaby
36th	1997–2000	Herb Dhaliwal	Liberal
37th	2000–2004	Herb Dhaliwal	Liberal
Riding dissolved into Vancouver South, Burnaby—New Westminster and Burnaby—Douglas

== Election results ==
2000 Canadian federal election
Party	Candidate	Votes	%	±%	Expenditures
Liberal	Herb Dhaliwal	17,705	42.70	+0.04	$58,673
Alliance	Ron Jack	15,384	37.10	+7.38	$28,116
New Democratic	Herschel Hardin	3,848	9.28	–9.85	$13,583
Progressive Conservative	Dan Tidball	2,649	6.39	+0.44	$2,621
Green	Imtiaz Popat	646	1.56	–0.06	$594
Independent	Michelle Jasmine Chang	465	1.12	–	none listed
Canadian Action	Adam Sealey	430	1.04	–	none listed
Independent	Derrick O'Keefe	158	0.38	–	$317
Marxist–Leninist	Charles Boylan	101	0.24	–0.11	$600
Natural Law	Prince Pabbies	81	0.20	–0.38	none listed
Total valid votes		41,467	99.31		
Total rejected ballots		288	0.69	–0.03	
Turnout		41,755	58.38	–5.84	
Eligible voters		71,523			
Liberal hold		Swing		–3.67	
Change for the Canadian Alliance is compared to the Reform Party.
Source: Elections Canada

1997 Canadian federal election
Party	Candidate	Votes	%	Expenditures
Liberal	Herb Dhaliwal	16,648	42.66	$54,591
Reform	Doug Hargrove	11,598	29.72	$23,380
New Democratic	Herschel Hardin	7,467	19.13	$35,574
Progressive Conservative	Donald W. Couch	2,321	5.95	$18,037
Green	Cyndi Thompson	633	1.62	none listed
Natural Law	Carolyn Grayson	224	0.57	none listed
Marxist–Leninist	Allan H. Bezanson	138	0.35	none listed
Total valid votes		39,029	99.29	
Total rejected ballots		281	0.71	
Turnout		39,310	64.22	
Eligible voters		61,215		
This riding was created from parts of Vancouver South and New Westminster—Burnaby, which elected a Liberal and a Reform candidate, respectively, in the previous election. Herb Dhaliwal was the incumbent from Vancouver South.
Source: Elections Canada

== See also ==
- List of Canadian electoral districts
- Historical federal electoral districts of Canada
