= New Westminster—Coquitlam—Burnaby =

Former federal electoral district in British Columbia, Canada

British Columbia electoral district

Defunct federal electoral district
- Legislature: House of Commons
- District created: 1996
- District abolished: 2003
- First contested: 1997
- Last contested: 2000

New Westminster—Coquitlam—Burnaby was a federal electoral district in British Columbia, Canada that was represented in the House of Commons of Canada from 1997 to 2004.

== Geography ==
This was an urban riding that contained the city of New Westminster, and those parts of Burnaby lying southeast of the Trans-Canada Highway, and the southwestern portion of Coquitlam.

== History ==
This riding was created in 1996 from parts of the electoral districts of New Westminster—Burnaby and Port Moody—Coquitlam.

This riding was used in the 1997 and 2000 federal elections.

In 2003, the district was abolished. Parts of it went into the electoral districts of New Westminster—Coquitlam, Burnaby—New Westminster and Burnaby—Douglas.

== Member of Parliament ==
Parliament	Years	Member	Party
Riding created from New Westminster—Burnaby and Port Moody—Coquitlam
36th	1997–2000	Paul Forseth	Reform
36th	2000–2000	Paul Forseth	Alliance
37th	2000–2003	Paul Forseth	Alliance
37th	2003–2004	Paul Forseth	Conservative
Riding dissolved into New Westminster—Coquitlam, and Burnaby—New Westminster

== Election results ==
2000 Canadian federal election
Party	Candidate	Votes	%	±%	Expenditures
Alliance	Paul Forseth	20,698	43.97	+9.49	$44,293
Liberal	Lee Rankin	14,579	30.97	+1.86	$64,668
New Democratic	Lorrie Williams	7,076	15.03	–15.44	$30,701
Progressive Conservative	Mike Redmond	3,492	7.42	+3.51	$11,866
Green	François C. Nantel	1,028	2.18	+0.69	$86
Communist	Hanne Gidora	109	0.23	–	$189
Marxist–Leninist	Brian Sproule	93	0.20	+0.00	$10
Total valid votes		47,075	99.56		
Total rejected ballots		206	0.44	–0.02	
Turnout		47,281	60.11	–5.33	
Eligible voters		78,658			
Alliance hold		Swing		+3.82	
Change for the Canadian Alliance is based on the Reform Party.
Source: Elections Canada

1997 Canadian federal election
Party	Candidate	Votes	%	Expenditures
Reform	Paul Forseth	15,915	34.47	$28,885
New Democratic	Dawn Black	14,067	30.47	$58,459
Liberal	Celso Boscariol	13,437	29.11	$51,245
Progressive Conservative	Debra Hicks	1,803	3.91	$12,174
Green	Tom Hetherington	691	1.50	$374
Natural Law	Daphne Quance	160	0.35	none listed
Marxist–Leninist	Elaine Wismer	93	0.20	none listed
Total valid votes		46,166	99.55	
Total rejected ballots		210	0.45	
Turnout		46,376	65.44	
Eligible voters		70,864		
Reform notional hold		Swing		–
This riding was created from New Westminster—Burnaby and Port Moody—Coquitlam, both of which elected a Reform candidate in the previous election. Paul Forseth was the incumbent from New Westminster—Burnaby.
Source: Elections Canada

== See also ==
- List of Canadian electoral districts
- Historical federal electoral districts of Canada
