= Dawn Black =

Canadian politician

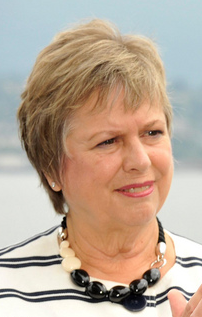

Leader of the Opposition of British Columbia
- In office January 20, 2011 – April 17, 2011
- Preceded by: Carole James
- Succeeded by: Adrian Dix

Interim leader of the British Columbia New Democratic Party
- In office January 20, 2011 – April 17, 2011
- Preceded by: Carole James
- Succeeded by: Adrian Dix

Member of the Legislative Assembly of British Columbia for New Westminster
- In office May 12, 2009 – May 13, 2013
- Preceded by: Chuck Puchmayr
- Succeeded by: Judy Darcy

Member of Parliament for New Westminster—Coquitlam
- In office April 3, 2006 – April 13, 2009
- Preceded by: Paul Forseth
- Succeeded by: Fin Donnelly

Member of Parliament for New Westminster—Burnaby
- In office November 21, 1988 – October 24, 1993
- Preceded by: riding established
- Succeeded by: Paul Forseth

Personal details
- Born: Dawn Whitty; April 1, 1943 (age 83) Vancouver, British Columbia, Canada
- Party: Federal: New Democratic; Provincial: New Democratic
- Spouse: Peter James Black (m. 1965)
- Profession: Executive assistant

Dawn Black (née Whitty; born April 1, 1943) is a Canadian politician in British Columbia, Canada. She represented the riding of New Westminster in the Legislative Assembly of British Columbia from 2009 to 2013. During that time, she served as interim leader of the British Columbia New Democratic Party (BC NDP) and Leader of the Opposition in British Columbia from January to April 2011.

Prior to that, she served as member of Parliament (MP) in the House of Commons of Canada on two occasions as part of the federal NDP caucus, representing the riding of New Westminster—Burnaby from 1988 to 1993, and the riding of New Westminster—Coquitlam from 2006 to 2009.

== Background ==
Born in Vancouver to John and Virginia Whitty, she married Peter Black in 1965, with whom she has three sons. She worked as an assistant to New Democratic Party MP Pauline Jewett of New Westminster—Coquitlam, as well as BC NDP member of the Legislative Assembly (MLA) for Maillardville-Coquitlam John Cashore.

== Member of Parliament ==
With Jewett declining to run in the 1988 federal election, Black received the NDP nomination to contest the newly established riding of New Westminster—Burnaby, and was elected the riding's MP. In the 34th Parliament she served as the NDP's critic for the status of women from 1989 to 1993, critic for child care from 1990 to 1993, and the party's deputy caucus chair from 1990 to 1991.

As an MP, one of her most notable achievements was proposing a private member's bill in 1991 that made December 6, the anniversary of the 1989 Montreal Massacre, a permanent day of remembrance and action on violence against women. She also led the opposition to the Tories' anti-abortion measure and proposed an anti-stalking measure, which was later adopted by Parliament.

In the 1993 election, she lost her seat to Reform Party candidate Paul Forseth. She contested the newly established riding of New Westminster—Coquitlam—Burnaby in the 1997 election, but lost to Forseth again. In the 2006 election she contested the re-established riding of New Westminster—Coquitlam, this time defeating Forseth (now representing the Conservative Party). She was named the NDP's defence critic.

On April 5, 2006, during the first question period of the 39th Parliament Black asked Gordon O'Connor, then Minister of National Defence, to renegotiate the prisoner transfer agreement with the Afghan government. O'Connor refused saying "Mr. Speaker, we have no intention of redrafting the agreement. The Red Cross and the Red Crescent are charged with ensuring that prisoners are not abused. There is nothing in the agreement that prevents Canada from determining the fate of prisoners so there is no need to make any change in the agreement." Black was prominent on the issue, which eventually saw the resignation of Gordon O'Connor and the negotiation of a new transfer agreement.

In the 2008 election, she defeated Conservative candidate Yonah Martin to retain her seat, and kept her post as the NDP's defence critic. In March 2009 she announced her resignation as MP to run for the BC NDP in the upcoming BC provincial election, aiming to succeed ailing NDP MLA Chuck Puchmayr in New Westminster. She stated she would remain in federal office long enough to draft a private member's bill restricting the use of civilian armoured vehicles, a significant issue in a city dealing with gang violence.

== Provincial politics ==
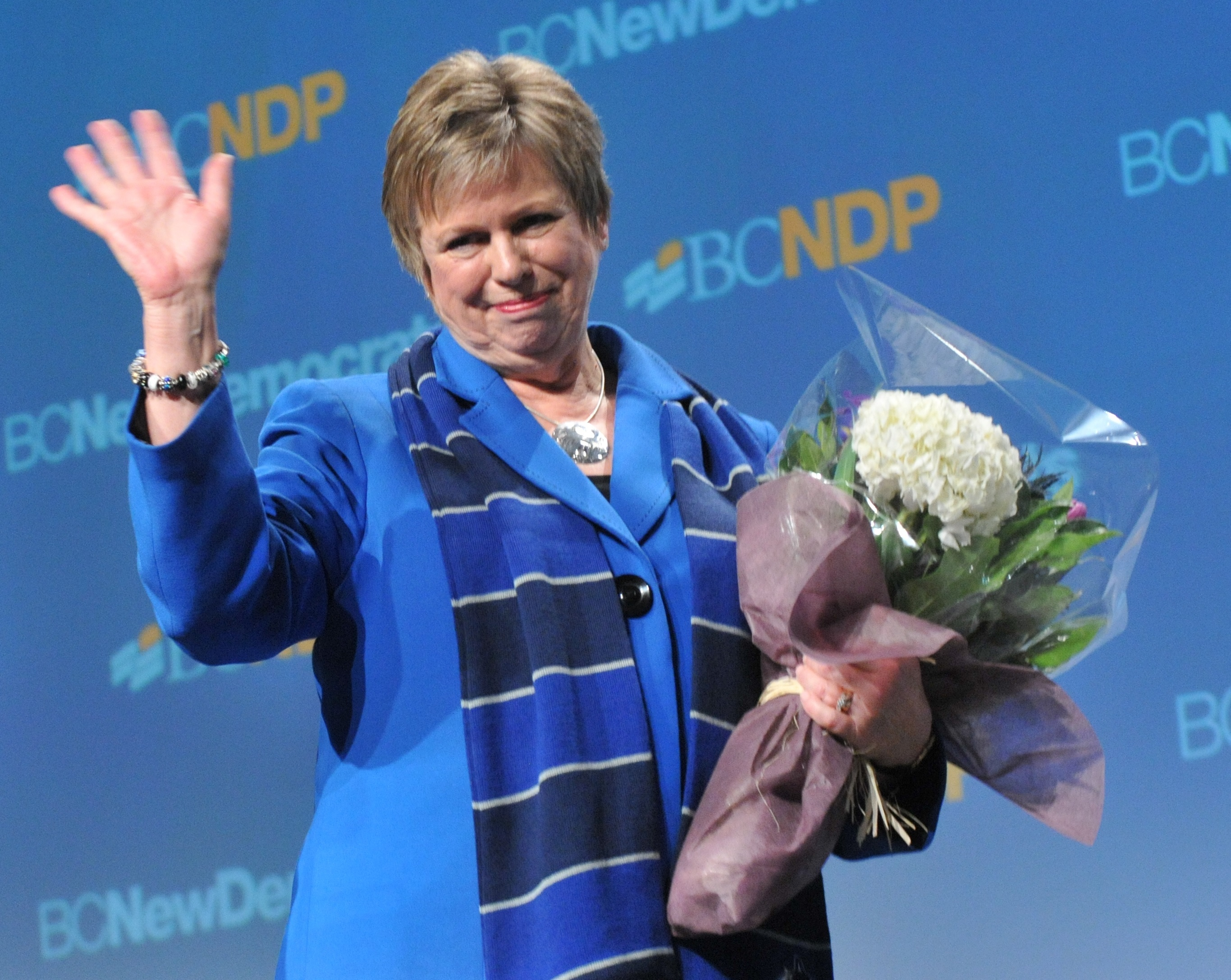
Dawn Black at the 2011 BC NDP leadership election

Following her departure from federal politics, Black was handily elected to the BC Legislature in May 2009.

Following the resignation of party leader Carole James, Black was unanimously nominated by the provincial caucus to be the interim leader of the BC NDP on January 19, 2011; the NDP's provincial council ratified the decision one day later. Black said after the nomination: "I've done a lot of tough things in my life - I've travelled to Afghanistan...The challenge is to prove to British Columbians that we're working together. Everybody made a commitment today to expose the broken promises of the Liberal government."

Her stint as interim leader ended upon the election of Adrian Dix in April 2011; she was subsequently named assistant deputy speaker by Dix. In August 2011 she announced she would not run again in the next provincial election; she continued to serve as MLA until the end of her term in 2013.

Black is a board member at the Broadbent Institute, a social democratic think tank.

Black endorsed Alberta MP Heather McPherson in the 2026 New Democratic Party leadership election.

== Electoral record ==
2009 British Columbia general election: New Westminster
Party	Candidate	Votes	%	±%	Expenditures
New Democratic	Dawn Black	13,418	56.36	+5.04	$80,256
Liberal	Carole Millar	8,240	34.61	−2.81	$24,880
Green	Matthew Laird	2,151	9.03	−0.34	$5,214
Total valid votes		23,809	100		
Total rejected ballots		137	0.57		
Turnout		23,946	55.99		
New Democratic hold		Swing		+3.93	

2008 Canadian federal election: New Westminster—Coquitlam
Party	Candidate	Votes	%	±%	Expenditures
New Democratic	Dawn Black	20,787	41.83	+3.52	$70,566
Conservative	Yonah Martin	19,299	38.83	+6.29	$83,305
Liberal	Michelle Hassen	5,615	11.29	−12.25	$19,178
Green	Marshall Smith	3,574	7.19	+4.25	$12,669
Libertarian	Lewis C. Dahlby	314	0.63	–	
Marxist–Leninist	Roland Verrier	103	0.20	+0.09	
Total valid votes/expense limit		49,692	100.0		$85,621
Total rejected ballots		165	0.33	−0.01	
Turnout		49,857	61.74	−3.55	
New Democratic hold		Swing		−1.39	

2006 Canadian federal election: New Westminster—Coquitlam
Party	Candidate	Votes	%	±%	Expenditures
New Democratic	Dawn Black	19,422	38.31	+5.68	$73,164
Conservative	Paul Forseth	16,494	32.54	−0.33	$74,916
Liberal	Joyce Murray	11,933	23.54	−3.86	$68,804
Green	Sven Biggs	1,491	2.94	−2.68	$5
Independent	Dick Estey	123	0.24	–	$102
Marxist–Leninist	Joseph Theriault	54	0.11	–	
Total valid votes		50,691	100.0		
Total rejected ballots		171	0.34	+0.06	
Turnout		50,870	65.29	+1.65	
New Democratic gain from Conservative		Swing		+3.01	

1993 Canadian federal election: New Westminster—Burnaby
Party	Candidate	Votes	%	±%
Reform	Paul E. Forseth	16,254	29.33	+26.32
Liberal	Leanore Copeland	15,430	27.84	+8.57
New Democratic	Dawn Black	14,442	26.06	-17.56
Progressive Conservative	Neil MacKay	6,419	11.58	-19.92
National	P. Jeffery Jewell	1,775	3.20	–
Natural Law	Carolyn Grayson	374	0.67	–
Green	Todd E. Romaine	313	0.56	-0.02
Libertarian	Robert Fong	267	0.48	-0.07
Independent	Jess P. Lee	73	0.13	–
Commonwealth of Canada	Geoff Dakin	70	0.13	–
Total valid votes		55,417	100.0	
Reform gain from New Democratic		Swing		+8.88

1988 Canadian federal election: New Westminster—Burnaby
Party	Candidate	Votes	%
New Democratic	Dawn Black	24,933	43.62
Progressive Conservative	Marie Taylor	18,007	31.50
Liberal	Carlos Brito	11,013	19.27
Reform	Bill Anderson	1,722	3.01
Social Credit	Randall Rush	718	1.26
Green	Richard Bidwell	332	0.58
Libertarian	Paul Geddes	316	0.55
Communist	Elsie Dean	116	0.20
Total valid votes		57,157	100.0
This riding was created from parts of Burnaby and New Westminster—Coquitlam, both of which elected a New Democrat in the last election.

== Archives ==
There is a Dawn Black fonds at Library and Archives Canada.
