= New Westminster—Coquitlam =

Former federal electoral district in British Columbia, Canada

British Columbia electoral district
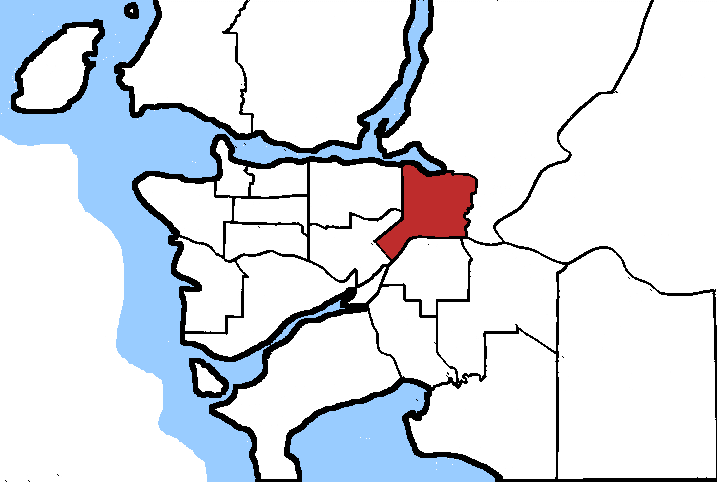
- New Westminster—Coquitlam in relation to other federal electoral districts in Vancouver
- Coordinates: 49.252°N 122.850°W

Federal electoral district
- Legislature: House of Commons
- District created: 2003
- District abolished: 2015
- First contested: 2004
- Last contested: 2011
- District webpage: profile, map

Demographics
- Population (2011): 122,899
- Electors (2011): 81,805
- Area (km²): 52.21
- Census division: Greater Vancouver
- Census subdivision(s): Coquitlam, New Westminster, Port Moody

New Westminster—Coquitlam was a federal electoral district in British Columbia, Canada, that was represented in the House of Commons of Canada from 1979 to 1988, and from 2004 to 2015.

== Demographics ==
According to the 2006 Canadian census

Ethnic groups: 69.7% White, 10.4% Chinese, 3.9% South Asian, 3.3% Korean, 3.1% Filipino, 2.3% Aboriginal, 1.8% West Asian, 1.3% Black, 1.2% Latin American, 1.0% Japanese
Languages: 66.3% English, 1.6% French, 31.9% Other
Religion: (2001) No religion 34.1%, Protestant 29.1%, 22.0% Catholic, Christian Orthodox 2.0%, Other Christian 5.7%, Muslim 2.5%, Buddhist 1.7%
Average income: $28,241

The riding has the highest percentage in Canada of people who work outside the municipality, but within the same census division.

== Geography ==
The district consisted of the eastern part of New Westminster, the southwestern part of Coquitlam and the southern part of Port Moody.

The NDP found much of its support in New Westminster, Port Moody and in the Maillardville part of Coquitlam. The Conservatives found most of their support in the more suburban parts of Coquitlam.

== History ==
This electoral district was first created in 1976 from New Westminster and Fraser Valley West ridings. It was abolished in 1987 when it was redistributed between New Westminster—Burnaby and Port Moody—Coquitlam ridings. It was re-created in 2003 from New Westminster—Coquitlam—Burnaby and Port Moody—Coquitlam—Port Coquitlam ridings.

It is currently the longest-held riding by non-government parties as both it and its predecessor ridings New Westminster—Coquitlam—Burnaby, New Westminster—Burnaby and New Westminster have not been represented by a member of the government side since 1968.

The 2012 electoral redistribution dissolved this riding into the ridings of Port Moody—Coquitlam and New Westminster—Burnaby for the 2015 election.

== Members of Parliament ==
This riding has elected the following members of Parliament:

Parliament	Years	Member	Party
Riding created from New Westminster and Fraser Valley West
31st	1979–1980	Pauline Jewett	New Democratic
32nd	1980–1984	Pauline Jewett	New Democratic
33rd	1984–1988	Pauline Jewett	New Democratic
Riding dissolved into New Westminster—Burnaby and Port Moody—Coquitlam
Riding re-created from New Westminster—Coquitlam—Burnaby and Port Moody—Coquitlam—Port Coquitlam
38th	2004–2006	Paul Forseth	Conservative
39th	2006–2008	Dawn Black	New Democratic
40th	2008–2009	Dawn Black	New Democratic
40th	2009–2011	Fin Donnelly	New Democratic
41st	2011–2015	Fin Donnelly	New Democratic
Riding dissolved into Port Moody—Coquitlam and New Westminster—Burnaby

== Election results ==
=== New Westminster—Coquitlam, 2004–2015 ===
2011 Canadian federal election
Party	Candidate	Votes	%	±%	Expenditures
New Democratic	Fin Donnelly	23,023	45.93	–3.79	$69,172.03
Conservative	Diana Dilworth	20,776	41.45	+5.78	$86,078.14
Liberal	Ken Beck Lee	4,069	8.12	–2.21	$25,266.86
Green	Rebecca Helps	2,160	4.31	+0.03	$3,498.04
Marxist–Leninist	Roland Verrier	95	0.19	–	none listed
Total valid votes/expense limit		50,123	99.70	–	$90,160.30
Total rejected ballots		153	0.30	+0.04	
Turnout		50,276	59.61	+29.65	
Eligible voters		84,337			
New Democratic hold		Swing		–4.79	
Source: Elections Canada

Canadian federal by-election, 9 November 2009 On the resignation of Dawn Black
Party	Candidate	Votes	%	±%	Expenditures
New Democratic	Fin Donnelly	12,171	49.73	+7.89	$73,836.40
Conservative	Diana Dilworth	8,730	35.67	–3.17	$76,993.22
Liberal	Ken Beck Lee	2,528	10.33	–0.97	$73,328.85
Green	Rebecca Helps	1,047	4.28	–2.91	$8,764.75
Total valid votes/expense limit		24,476	99.74	–	$89,079.96
Total rejected ballots		65	0.26	–0.07	
Turnout		24,541	29.96	–31.78	
Eligible voters		81,903			
New Democratic hold		Swing		+5.53	
Source: Elections Canada

2008 Canadian federal election
Party	Candidate	Votes	%	±%	Expenditures
New Democratic	Dawn Black	20,787	41.83	+3.51	$70,900.55
Conservative	Yonah Martin	19,299	38.84	+6.30	$93,551.75
Liberal	Michelle Hassen	5,615	11.30	–12.23	$18,056.85
Green	Marshall Smith	3,574	7.19	+4.24	$12,668.89
Libertarian	Lewis C. Dahlby	314	0.63	–	none listed
Marxist–Leninist	Roland Verrier	103	0.21	+0.10	none listed
Total valid votes/expense limit		49,692	99.67	–	$85,621.43
Total rejected ballots		165	0.33	–0.01	
Turnout		49,857	61.74	–3.55	
Eligible voters		80,755			
New Democratic hold		Swing		–1.39	
Source: Elections Canada

2006 Canadian federal election
Party	Candidate	Votes	%	±%	Expenditures
New Democratic	Dawn Black	19,427	38.32	+5.68	$73,164.63
Conservative	Paul Forseth	16,494	32.53	–0.34	$73,884.32
Liberal	Joyce Murray	11,931	23.53	–3.87	$68,804.72
Green	Sven Biggs	1,496	2.95	–2.67	$5.00
Independent	Paul Warnett	1,174	2.32	–	$9,543.11
Independent	Dick Estey	123	0.24	–	$117.60
Marxist–Leninist	Joseph Theriault	54	0.11	–	none listed
Total valid votes/expense limit		50,699	99.66	–	$78,964.80
Total rejected ballots		171	0.34	+0.06	
Turnout		50,870	65.29	+1.65	
Eligible voters		77,916			
New Democratic gain from Conservative		Swing		+3.01	
Source: Elections Canada

2004 Canadian federal election
Party	Candidate	Votes	%	±%	Expenditures
Conservative	Paul Forseth	15,693	32.87	–	$61,650.72
New Democratic	Steve McClurg	15,580	32.64	–	$49,831.25
Liberal	David Carl Haggard	13,080	27.40	–	$65,490.81
Green	Carli Travers	2,684	5.62	–	$1,886.60
Christian Heritage	Jack Hummelman	700	1.47	–	$15,340.74
Total valid votes/expense limit		47,737	99.72	–	$75,429.93
Total rejected ballots		133	0.28		
Turnout		47,870	63.63		
Eligible voters		75,227			
Conservative notional hold		Swing		–	
This riding was re-created from parts of New Westminster—Coquitlam—Burnaby and Port Moody—Coquitlam—Port Coquitlam, both of which elected a Canadian Alliance candidate in the last election. Paul Forseth was the incumbent from New Westminster—Coquitlam—Burnaby.
Source: Elections Canada

=== New Westminster—Coquitlam, 1979–1988 ===
1984 Canadian federal election
Party	Candidate	Votes	%	±%
New Democratic	Pauline Jewett	21,134	46.18	–0.24
Progressive Conservative	Bill Grant	18,291	39.96	+5.87
Liberal	Terry Julian	5,816	12.71	–6.43
Rhinoceros	Keath Bur-head Crawley	395	0.86	–
Communist	Rod Doran	133	0.29	–0.06
Total valid votes		45,769	99.64	
Total rejected ballots		164	0.36	+0.12
Turnout		45,933	78.32	+7.49
Eligible voters		58,651		
New Democratic hold		Swing		–3.06
Source: Elections Canada

1980 Canadian federal election
Party	Candidate	Votes	%	±%
New Democratic	Pauline Jewett	19,498	46.42	+1.98
Progressive Conservative	Ted Eakins	14,321	34.09	–1.26
Liberal	Carl Miller	8,041	19.14	–0.56
Communist	Rod Doran	147	0.35	+0.11
Total valid votes		42,007	99.76	
Total rejected ballots		99	0.24	+0.04
Turnout		42,106	70.82	–5.75
Eligible voters		59,453		
New Democratic hold		Swing		+1.62
Source: Elections Canada

1979 Canadian federal election
Party	Candidate	Votes	%	±%
New Democratic	Pauline Jewett	19,301	44.43	–
Progressive Conservative	Marg Gregory	15,358	35.36	–
Liberal	Les Garrison	8,559	19.70	–
Independent	Joe Lehnert	118	0.27	–
Communist	Rod Doran	103	0.24	–
Total valid votes		43,439	99.81	
Total rejected ballots		84	0.19	–
Turnout		43,523	76.57	–
Eligible voters		56,842		
New Democratic notional hold		Swing		–
This riding was created from parts of New Westminster and Fraser Valley West, which elected a New Democrat and a Progressive Conservative, respectively, in the last election. Pauline Jewett was the incumbent from New Westminster.
Source: Elections Canada

== See also ==
- List of Canadian electoral districts
- Historical federal electoral districts of Canada
