= Burnaby—Douglas =

Former federal electoral district in British Columbia, Canada

Coordinates: 49.262°N 122.969°W

British Columbia electoral district
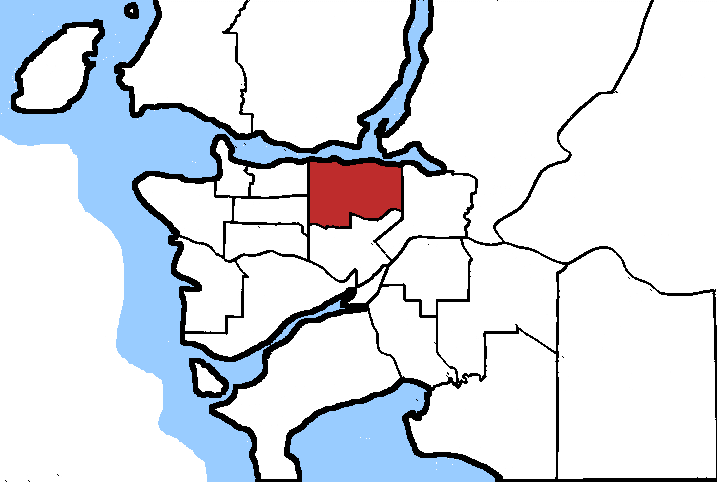
- Burnaby—Douglas in relation to other federal electoral districts in Vancouver

Defunct federal electoral district
- Legislature: House of Commons
- District created: 1996
- First contested: 1997
- Last contested: 2011
- District webpage: profile, map

Demographics
- Population (2011): 123,275
- Electors (2011): 82,291
- Area (km²): 57.51
- Census division: Greater Vancouver Regional District
- Census subdivision: Burnaby

Burnaby—Douglas was a federal electoral district in the province of British Columbia, Canada, that was represented in the House of Commons of Canada from 1997 to 2012. It was named after the city of Burnaby, as well as Douglas Road and Tommy Douglas, an MP who represented the area in the 1960s.

== History ==
This electoral district was created in 1996 from New Westminster—Burnaby and Burnaby—Kingsway ridings. Portions of Vancouver South—Burnaby and New Westminster—Coquitlam—Burnaby have been added to it since.

The 2012 electoral redistribution dissolved this riding and incorporated it into Burnaby North—Seymour and Burnaby South for the 2015 election.

== Members of Parliament ==
This riding elected the following members of Parliament:

| Parliament | Years | Member | Party |
|---|---|---|---|
Riding created from New Westminster—Burnaby and Burnaby—Kingsway
| 36th | 1997–2000 | Svend Robinson | New Democratic |
| 37th | 2000–2004 | Svend Robinson | New Democratic |
| 38th | 2004–2006 | Bill Siksay | New Democratic |
| 39th | 2006–2008 | Bill Siksay | New Democratic |
| 40th | 2008–2011 | Bill Siksay | New Democratic |
| 41st | 2011–2015 | Kennedy Stewart | New Democratic |
Riding dissolved into Burnaby North—Seymour and Burnaby South

== Election results ==
2011 Canadian federal election
| Party | Candidate | Votes | % | ±% | Expenditures |
|---|---|---|---|---|---|
| New Democratic | Kennedy Stewart | 20,943 | 43.00 | +5.06 | $77,861.67 |
| Conservative | Ronald Leung | 19,932 | 40.92 | +4.67 | $89,756.16 |
| Liberal | Ken Low | 5,451 | 11.19 | –8.22 | $52,769.12 |
| Green | Adrianne Merlo | 1,754 | 3.60 | –2.37 | $1,312.73 |
| Libertarian | Lewis Clarke Dahlby | 420 | 0.86 | – | none listed |
| Communist | George Gidora | 153 | 0.31 | –0.12 | $306.07 |
| Marxist–Leninist | Brian Sproule | 57 | 0.12 | – | none listed |
| Total valid votes/expense limit | | 48,710 | 99.55 | – | $90,613.21 |
| Total rejected ballots | | 220 | 0.45 | +0.01 | |
| Turnout | | 48,930 | 57.63 | –0.08 | |
| Eligible voters | | 84,911 | | | |
| New Democratic hold | | Swing | | +4.86 | |
Source: Elections Canada

2008 Canadian federal election
| Party | Candidate | Votes | % | ±% | Expenditures |
|---|---|---|---|---|---|
| New Democratic | Bill Siksay | 17,937 | 37.94 | +2.37 | $65,083.88 |
| Conservative | Ronald Leung | 17,139 | 36.25 | +8.60 | $68,581.76 |
| Liberal | Bill Cunningham | 9,177 | 19.41 | –13.61 | $53,567.93 |
| Green | Doug Perry | 2,822 | 5.97 | +2.49 | $1,568.25 |
| Communist | George Gidora | 203 | 0.43 | +0.15 | $377.53 |
| Total valid votes/expense limit | | 47,278 | 99.56 | – | $85,965.84 |
| Total rejected ballots | | 208 | 0.44 | +0.11 | |
| Turnout | | 47,486 | 57.71 | –4.55 | |
| Eligible voters | | 82,291 | | | |
| New Democratic hold | | Swing | | +7.99 | |
Source: Elections Canada

2006 Canadian federal election
| Party | Candidate | Votes | % | ±% | Expenditures |
|---|---|---|---|---|---|
| New Democratic | Bill Siksay | 17,323 | 35.57 | +0.98 | $77,179.14 |
| Liberal | Bill Cunningham | 16,079 | 33.02 | +0.49 | $64,142.17 |
| Conservative | George Drazenovic | 13,467 | 27.65 | +0.02 | $33,868.68 |
| Green | Ray Power | 1,694 | 3.48 | –0.24 | $81.30 |
| Communist | Timothy George Gidora | 138 | 0.28 | +0.01 | $522.00 |
| Total valid votes/expense limit | | 48,701 | 99.68 | – | $78,494.81 |
| Total rejected ballots | | 158 | 0.32 | –0.38 | |
| Turnout | | 48,859 | 62.26 | +0.76 | |
| Eligible voters | | 78,481 | | | |
| New Democratic hold | | Swing | | +0.74 | |
Source: Elections Canada

2004 Canadian federal election
| Party | Candidate | Votes | % | ±% | Expenditures |
|---|---|---|---|---|---|
| New Democratic | Bill Siksay | 15,682 | 34.59 | –2.81 | $60,198.33 |
| Liberal | Bill Cunningham | 14,748 | 32.53 | +8.85 | $63,488.44 |
| Conservative | George Drazenovic | 12,531 | 27.64 | –10.89 | $71,991.61 |
| Green | Shawn Hunsdale | 1,687 | 3.72 | – | none listed |
| Libertarian | Adam Desaulniers | 291 | 0.64 | – | none listed |
| Independent | Frank Cerminara | 282 | 0.62 | – | $1,050.00 |
| Communist | Hanne Gidora | 122 | 0.27 | –0.15 | $407.03 |
| Total valid votes/expense limit | | 45,343 | 99.30 | – | $74,713.25 |
| Total rejected ballots | | 320 | 0.70 | +0.21 | |
| Turnout | | 45,663 | 61.49 | –0.85 | |
| Eligible voters | | 74,258 | | | |
| New Democratic hold | | Swing | | –5.83 | |
Source: Elections Canada

2000 Canadian federal election
| Party | Candidate | Votes | % | ±% | Expenditures |
|---|---|---|---|---|---|
| New Democratic | Svend Robinson | 17,018 | 37.39 | –5.69 | $50,374 |
| Alliance | Alan McDonnell | 15,057 | 33.08 | +6.54 | $49,282 |
| Liberal | Francesca Zumpano | 10,774 | 23.67 | –2.41 | $57,489 |
| Progressive Conservative | Kenneth Edgar King | 2,477 | 5.44 | +2.06 | $12,954 |
| Communist | Roger Perkins | 189 | 0.42 | – | $189 |
| Total valid votes | | 45,515 | 99.51 | | |
| Total rejected ballots | | 225 | 0.49 | +0.04 | |
| Turnout | | 45,740 | 62.34 | –5.71 | |
| Eligible voters | | 73,370 | | | |
| New Democratic hold | | Swing | | –6.11 | |
Source: Elections Canada

1997 Canadian federal election
| Party | Candidate | Votes | % | ±% | Expenditures |
|---|---|---|---|---|---|
| New Democratic | Svend Robinson | 19,058 | 43.08 | – | $45,632 |
| Reform | Gary Eyre | 11,743 | 26.55 | – | $38,897 |
| Liberal | Mobina Jaffer | 11,536 | 26.08 | – | $55,707 |
| Progressive Conservative | Ray Power | 1,498 | 3.39 | – | $9,924 |
| Natural Law | Valerie Hubert | 300 | 0.68 | – | none listed |
| Marxist–Leninist | Brian Sproule | 103 | 0.23 | – | none listed |
| Total valid votes | | 44,238 | 99.54 | | |
| Total rejected ballots | | 203 | 0.46 | – | |
| Turnout | | 44,441 | 68.05 | – | |
| Eligible voters | | 65,305 | | | |
| New Democratic notional hold | | Swing | | – | |
Source: Elections Canada

== See also ==
- List of Canadian electoral districts
- Historical federal electoral districts of Canada
