= Paul Forseth =

Canadian politician

Member of Parliament for New Westminster—Coquitlam (New Westminster—Coquitlam—Burnaby; 1997–2004) (New Westminster—Burnaby; 1993–1997)
- In office October 25, 1993 – January 23, 2006
- Preceded by: Dawn Black
- Succeeded by: Dawn Black

Personal details
- Born: Paul Eugene Forseth; December 10, 1946 (age 79) North Vancouver, British Columbia, Canada
- Party: Reform; Canadian Alliance; Conservative

Paul Eugene Forseth (born December 10, 1946) is a Canadian politician, who was a member of Parliament for British Columbia from 1993 to 2006.

He was first elected as the Member of Parliament for New Westminster—Burnaby in the 1993 federal election, as a member of the Reform Party of Canada, defeating New Democrat member of Parliament (MP) Dawn Black. He won reelection in 1997 as a Reform Party Member, in 2000 as a member of the Canadian Alliance and in 2004 as a member of the Conservative Party, until Black defeated him in the 2006 election.

During his 12 years of elected office, he was not part of the government, but served from the 'Opposition Benches'.

In the Reform Party, he was instrumental to sponsor major planks of the Reform Party platform published in the Reform "Blue Sheet" concerning 'Justice' and 'Environment' policy, and led House of Commons debates on those subjects.

During his Canadian Alliance tenure, he was part of the 'shadow cabinet' under Stockwell Day, leader of the Official Opposition.

During the Conservative Party term, he was his Party's lead representative on the Government Operations and Estimates Committee, which investigated the administrative record of Privacy Commissioner George Radwanski. Forseth co-chaired the sub-committee which held in-camera investigative hearings. Radwanski was accused of falsifying documents and other administrative excesses by the Auditor General, (Ottawa Citizen Oct. 01, 2003) After Parliamentary hearings, the G.O.E.Committee tabled a report in the House of Commons. (37th PARLIAMENT, 2nd SESSION HANSARD • NUMBER 150 Tuesday, November 4, 2003) As a consequence, the House of Commons declared George Radwanski to be in contempt of Parliament. (37th PARLIAMENT, 2nd SESSION HANSARD • NUMBER 152 Thursday, November 6, 2003) “That this House find George Radwanski to have been in contempt of this House, and acknowledge receipt of his letter of apology, tabled and read to the House earlier today.”

Paul Forseth was also among the very few MPs in Parliamentary history to ever have his Private Members Bill, coming from the Opposition side of the House, cooperatively taken over by the government and incorporated into a larger piece Government Legislation. (Bankruptcy and Insolvency Act - discharge list). (Hansard Tuesday, October 22, 1996)

As of September 2009, Forseth is again a Conservative candidate. He said “I have been nominated as the Conservative Party candidate in the district of Burnaby-New Westminster. I am offering myself for service, as our community needs a Conservative voice at the national level.” (source - paulforseth - blogspot)

May 2, 2011, there was the national federal election, and Prime Minister Stephen Harper consolidated his government standing by achieving a majority by winning 167 out of 308 seats in the House of Commons. Paul Forseth was a candidate in the election but was not successful to unseat the NDP incumbent Peter Julian who has held the district of Burnaby-New Westminster since 2004. Mr. Forseth came in second place with the Liberal candidate Garth Evans achieving third place.

Forseth was the BC-Conservative Candidate (Provincial) for the local district of New Westminster. Voting Day was May 14, 2013, and he was unsuccessful.

He is retired and lives in Powell River, British Columbia.

2013 British Columbia general election: New Westminster
| Party | Candidate | Votes | % | ±% | Expenditures |
|---|---|---|---|---|---|
| New Democratic | Judy Darcy | 13,170 | 48.84 | −7.52 | $126,704 |
| Liberal | Hector Bremner | 8,997 | 33.37 | −1.24 | $56,036 |
| Green | Terry Teather | 2,252 | 8.35 | −0.68 | $1,417 |
| Conservative | Paul Forseth | 1,318 | 4.89 | − | $1,450 |
| Independent | James Crosty | 1,038 | 3.85 | − | #3,530 |
| Libertarian | Lewis Dahlby | 190 | 0.70 | − | $250 |
| Total valid votes | | 26,965 | 100.00 | | |
| Total rejected ballots | | 132 | 0.49 | | |
| Turnout | | 27,097 | 57.81 | | |
Source: Elections BC
