= CPL =

CPL or Cpl may refer to:

== Organizations ==
- CPFL Energia (NYSE: CPL), the largest non state-owned group of electric energy generation and distribution in Brazil
- CPL Aromas, a British fragrance company formerly known as Contemporary Perfumers Limited
- CPL Resources, a resourcing/placement company based in Dublin
- CPL Productions (formerly Celador Productions Limited), a British television and radio production company

=== Libraries ===
- Calgary Public Library, the public library system serving Calgary, Alberta, Canada
- Chicago Public Library, the public library system that serves the city of Chicago, Illinois, US
- Cleveland Public Library, the public library system that serves the city of Cleveland, Ohio, US
- Coquitlam Public Library, the public library system serving Coquitlam, British Columbia, Canada

== Science and technology ==
- Caprolactam, an organic compound with the formula (CH_{2})_{5}C(O)NH
- Chemical Physics Letters, a peer-reviewed scientific journal
- Chinese Physics Letters, an open access scientific journal published in China, from the Chinese Physical Society
- Circular polarizing filter, a type of photographic filter
- Crackle Photolithography, a kind of cost efficient photolithography process using random crack template as mask.
- Clavis Patrum Latinorum, a reference volume on the Latin Fathers published by Brepols of Turnhout in Belgium

=== Computing ===
- Call-Processing Language, a language that can be used to describe and control Internet telephony services
- Characters per line, the maximal number of monospaced characters that may appear on a single line
- Command Programming Language, a scripting language used by the PRIMOS operating system
- Common Public License, a free software/open-source software license published by IBM
- Complementary pass-transistor logic, one of many logic families of pass transistor logic used in the design of integrated circuits
- Composition Playlist, a file that defines the playback order of a Digital Cinema Package
- .cpl files, the Control Panel applets in Microsoft Windows
- CPL (programming language), a multi-paradigm programming language
- Current privilege level, of a task or program on x86 CPUs

== Sports ==
- Cambodian Premier League, association football league in Cambodia
- Canadian Premier League, a men's professional soccer league at the highest level in Canada
  - CPL Shield, a trophy awarded at the conclusion of each regular season
- Caribbean Premier League, a Twenty20 cricket league
- Coastal Plain League, a wood-bat collegiate summer league
- Coastal Plain League (Class D), a former minor league baseball affiliation
- Crimean Premier League, association football league in Crimea
- Cyberathlete Professional League, a professional sports tournament organization specializing in computer and console video game competitions

== Other uses ==
- Centre for Professional Learning, on the Campus The Hague of Leiden University, Netherlands
- Cents Per Line, a measurement of how much transcriptionists are paid for their work
- Certified Professional Landman, the highest designation offered to landmen in the oil/gas industry by the American Association of Professional Landmen
- Certified Professional Locksmith, a trade qualification awarded to members of the ALOA Security Professionals Association
- Clavis Patrum Latinorum, a numbered list of the Latin authors in the Corpus Christianorum
- Codices Palatini latini, the Latin section of the medieval manuscript collection in the Bibliotheca Palatina in Heidelberg.
- Color position light, a type of North American railroad signal
- Commercial pilot licence, a qualification that permits the holder to act and be paid as an aircraft pilot
- Concealed Pistol License, a permit for concealed carry in the United States
- Contemporary Pictorial Literature, a 1970s comic book fanzine published by the CPL Gang
- Continuous pressure laminate, decorative laminate produced using pressure in a continuous process
- Corporal (Cpl or CPL), a rank in use in some form by most militaries and some police forces
- Cost per Lead, an online advertising pricing model
- Criminal procedure law

== See also ==
- Communist Party of Latvia (Latvian: LKP), a former political party in Latvia
- Communist Party of Lithuania (Lithuanian: LKP), a former political party in Lithuania
- Communist Party of Luxembourg (Luxembourgish and German: KPL, French: PCL), a political party in Luxembourg
