= Coquitlam =

City in British Columbia, Canada

- City
- City of Coquitlam
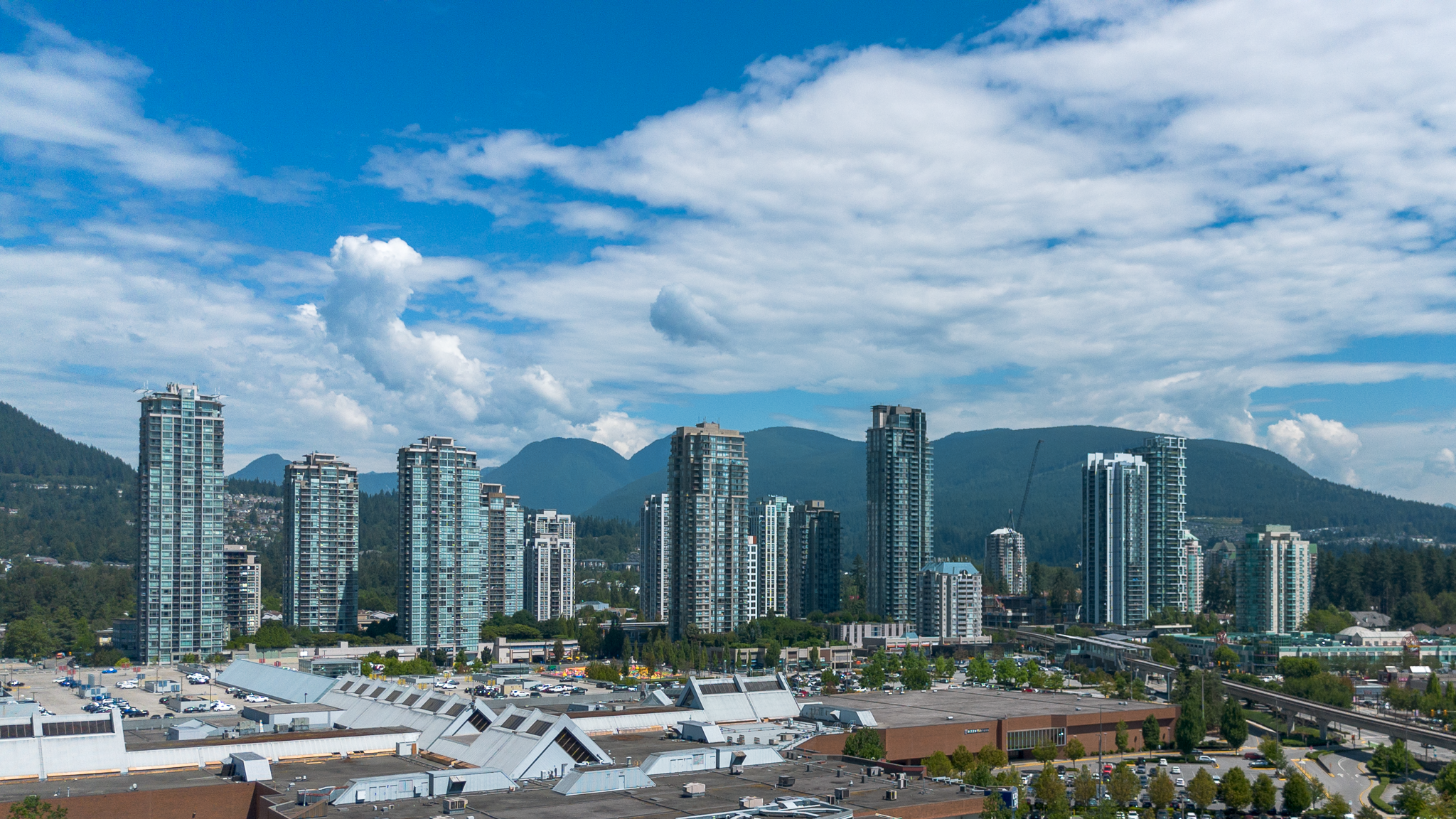
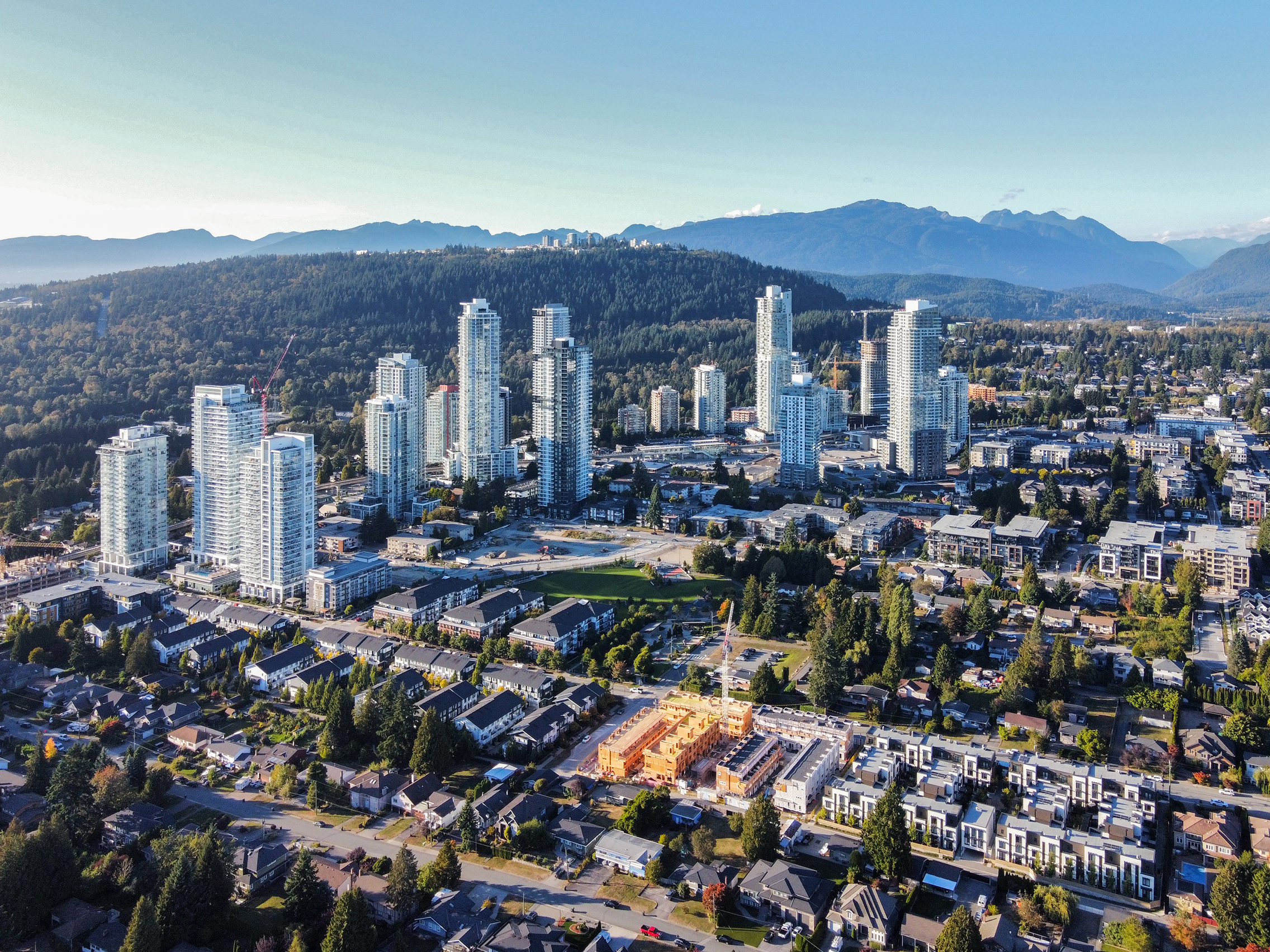
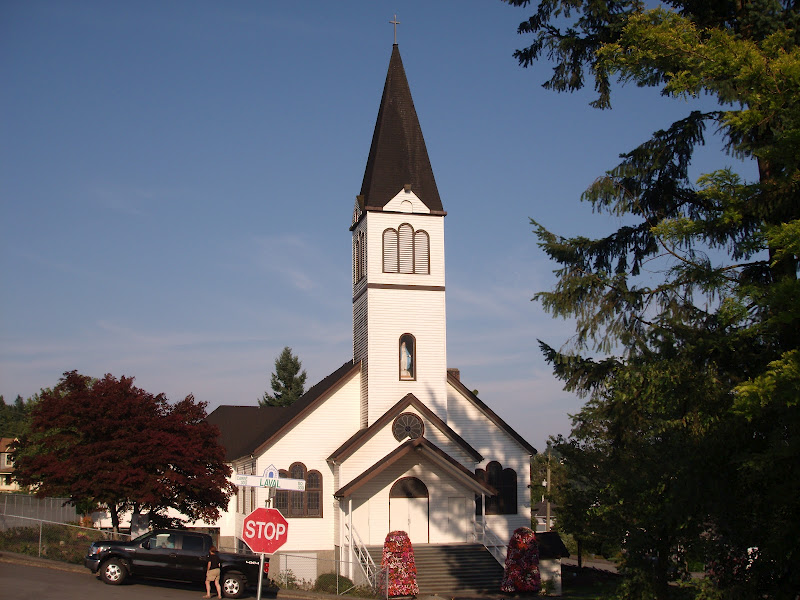
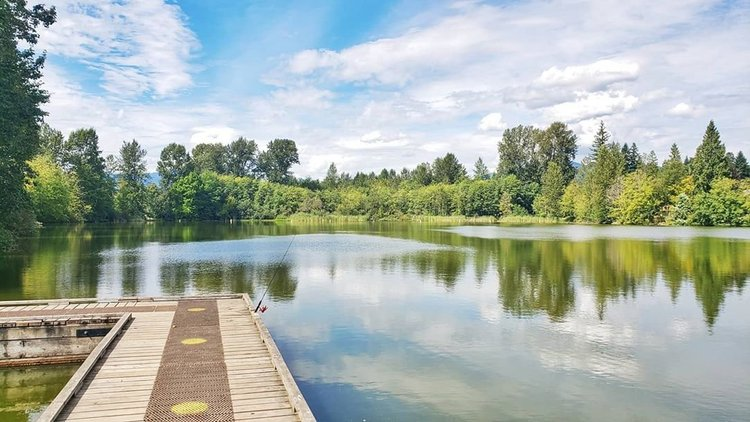
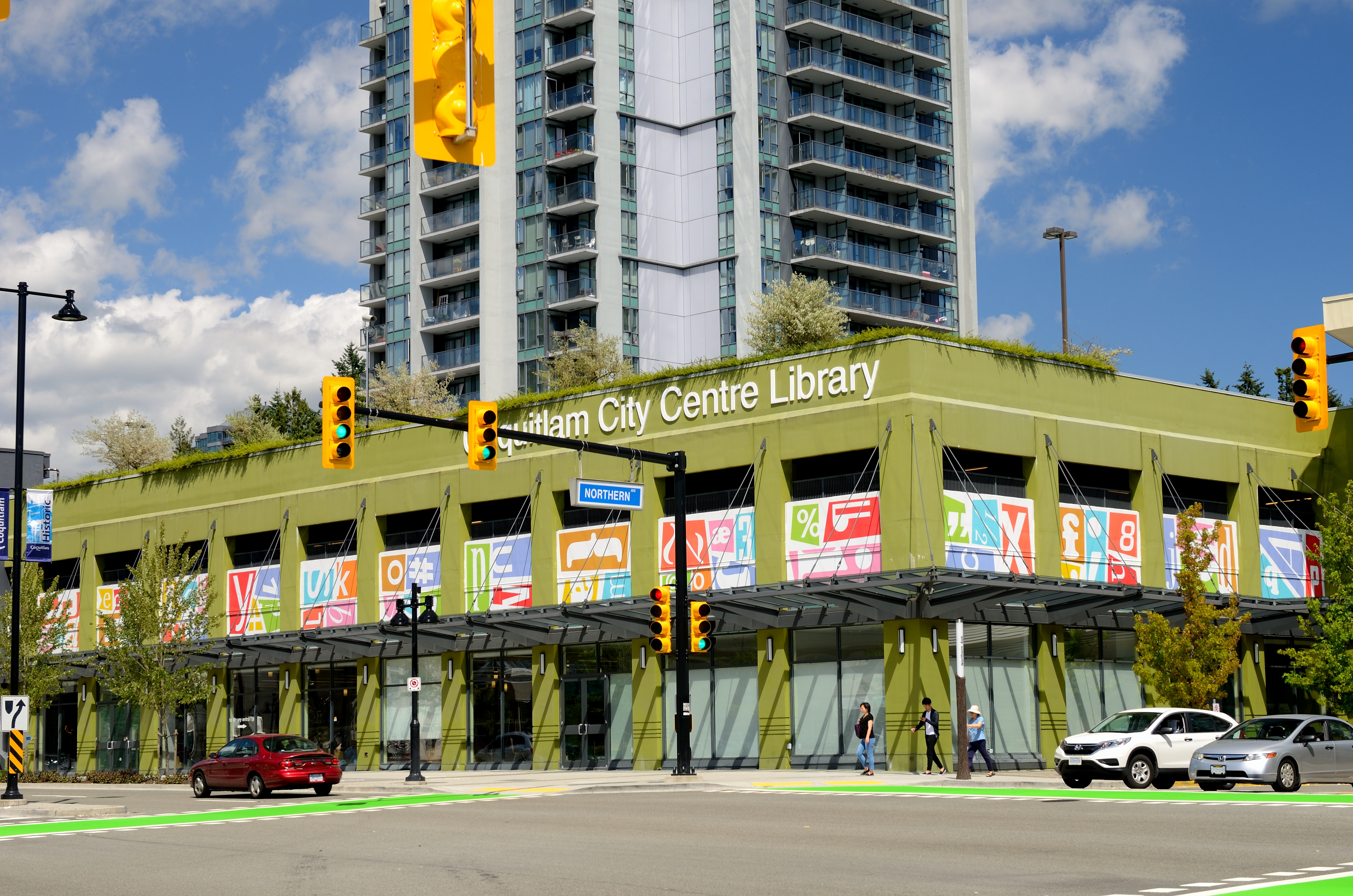
- Coquitlam Town Centre Burquitlam Maillardville Como Lake Coquitlam Public Library

- Flag Coat of arms Logo
- Motto: The Spirit of the Rivers is the Strength of the People
- Location of Coquitlam in Metro Vancouver
- Coordinates: 49°17′02″N 122°47′31″W
- Country: Canada
- Province: British Columbia
- Regional district: Metro Vancouver
- First settled: 7000 BCE
- Incorporated as a district municipality: July 25, 1891
- Amalgamated: October 7, 1971
- Incorporated as a city: June 18, 1992
- Seat: Coquitlam City Hall

Government
  - Type: Mayor-council government
  - Body: Coquitlam City Council
  - Mayor: Craig Hodge
  - City Council: List of councillors: Matt Djonlic; Robert Mazzarolo; Steve Kim; Teri Towner; Matthew Sebastiani; Harvey Su; Rosalinda Thorleifson; Bejamin Perry
  - MPs (fed.): List of MPs: Zoe Royer (Liberal) Port Moody—Coquitlam; Ron McKinnon (Liberal) Coquitlam—Port Coquitlam
  - MLAs (prov.): List of MLAs: John McEwen (Conservative) Port Moody-Burquitlam; Matt Liang (Conservative)) Coquitlam-Maillardville; Ryan Peterson(Conservative) Coquitlam-Burke Mountain

Area
  - Total: 152.5 km^{2} (58.9 sq mi)
  - Land: 122.15 km^{2} (47.16 sq mi)
- Elevation: 24 m (79 ft)

Population (2021)
  - Total: 148,625
  - Estimate (2026): 178,477
  - Rank: 34th in Canada; 6th in British Columbia; 5th in Metro Vancouver
  - Density: 1,216.7/km^{2} (3,151/sq mi)
- Time zone: UTC−07:00 (Pacific Time)
- Forward sortation area: V3E, V3J – V3K
- Area codes: 604, 778, 236, 672
- Website: www.coquitlam.ca

Coquitlam (/koʊˈkwɪtləm/ koh-KWIT-ləm) is a suburban city in the Lower Mainland area of British Columbia, Canada. It is one of the 21 municipalities comprising Metro Vancouver, and is the largest municipality in the Tri-Cities.

Coquitlam was first settled by First Nations peoples thousands of years ago, and today is home to an ethnically diverse population estimated at 178,477 in 2026, making it the sixth-largest city in the province.

Coquitlam is governed by a mayor and city council, along with school trustees and roles, with elections held every four years on the third Saturday of October. The current mayor of Coquitlam is Craig Hodge.

== History ==
The Coast Salish peoples were the first to inhabit this area, and archaeology confirms continuous occupation of the territory for at least 9,000 years. The name Kwikwetlem is said to be derived from a Coast Salish term "kʷikʷəƛ̓əm" meaning "red fish up the river".

Explorer Simon Fraser travelled through the region in 1808, and in the 1860s Europeans gradually started settling the area. Coquitlam began as a "place-in-between" after the construction of North Road in the mid-19th century, undertaken to provide the soldiers of the Royal Engineers in New Westminster with access to the year-round port facilities in Port Moody.

The young municipality got its first boost in 1889 when Frank Ross and James McLaren opened what would become Fraser Mills, a $350,000 state-of-the-art lumber mill on the north bank of the Fraser River. The Corporation of the District of Coquitlam was then incorporated in 1891. In 1908, a mill manager's residence was built which would later be named Ryan House, for managers Tom and Maurice Ryan. At the same time, Sikh immigrants also constructed a gurdwara. Ryan House went on to become the site of the Coquitlam RCMP detachment from 1961 to 1972, and then the home of Place des Arts.

Over the next two years, several contingents of French Canadian mill workers arrived from Quebec, and Maillardville was born. Named for Father Edmond Maillard, a young Oblate from France, it became the largest Francophone centre west of Manitoba. Maillardville's past is recognized today in street names, the Francophone education system and French immersion programs, French-language Girl Guides and scouts, and celebrations such as Festival du Bois.

Following World War II, Coquitlam and the rest of the Lower Mainland experienced substantial population growth which continues today. The opening of Lougheed Highway in 1953 made the city more accessible and set the stage for residential growth. In 1971, Coquitlam and Fraser Mills were amalgamated, which gave the city a larger industrial base. The mill closed in 2001, and is currently the subject of a proposed waterfront community.

== Geography ==
Coquitlam is situated some 10 to 15 km (6.2 to 9.3 mi) east of Vancouver, where the Coquitlam River connects with the Fraser River and extends northeast along the Pitt River toward the Coquitlam and Pitt lakes. Coquitlam borders Burnaby and Port Moody to the west, New Westminster to the southwest, and Port Coquitlam to the southeast. Burke Mountain, Eagle Ridge, and the 1,583 m (5,194 ft) tall Coquitlam Mountain form the northern boundary of the city. Coquitlam's area, 152.5 square kilometres (58.9 sq mi), is about six times larger than either Port Moody or Port Coquitlam. Coquitlam's geographic shape can be thought of as a tilted hourglass, having two larger parcels of land with a smaller central section connecting them.

Coquitlam is in the Pacific Time Zone (PCT, UTC−7 year-round), and the Pacific Maritime Ecozone.

=== Neighbourhoods ===
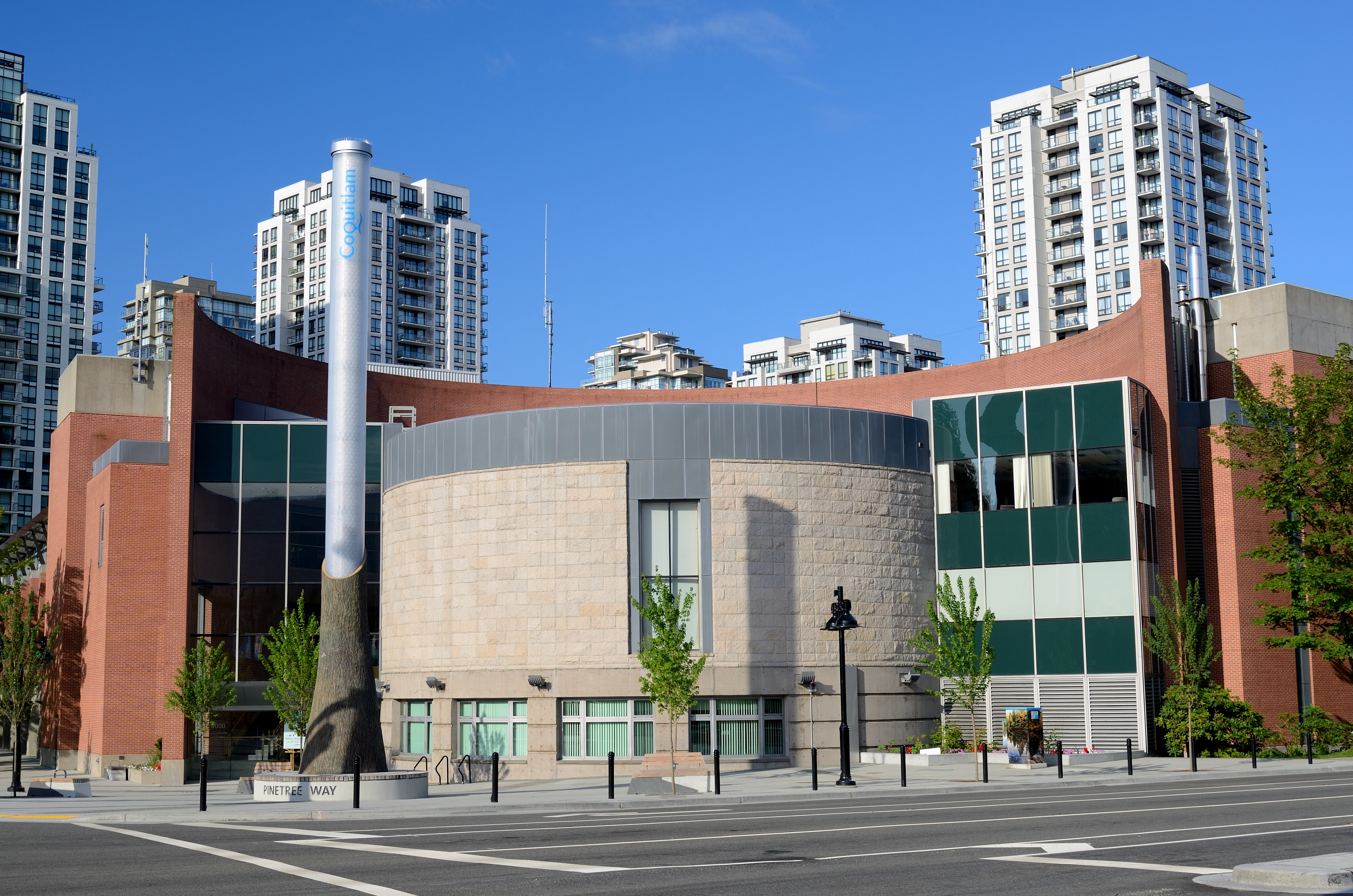
Coquitlam City Hall

Southwest Coquitlam comprises the historical core of the city, with Maillardville and the Fraser River industrial sector giving way to the large, elevated, flat-plateaued residential areas of Austin Heights. These older residences, with larger property dimensions, are increasingly being torn down and replaced with newer and larger homes. The Poirier Street area was the city's original recreational centre with the Coquitlam Sports Centre, Chimo Aquatic and Fitness Centre, and sports fields located there, while City Hall was previously located further south in Maillardville.

The Austin Heights area contains Como Lake, a renowned urban fishing and recreation area, and headwaters for the Como watershed. The watershed represents one of the last urban watersheds in the Tri-Cities that supports wild stocks of coho salmon as well as other species at risk such as coastal cutthroat trout (both sea-run and resident) and bird species such as the great blue heron and green heron. It also contains Mundy Park, one of the largest urban parks in the Metro Vancouver area.

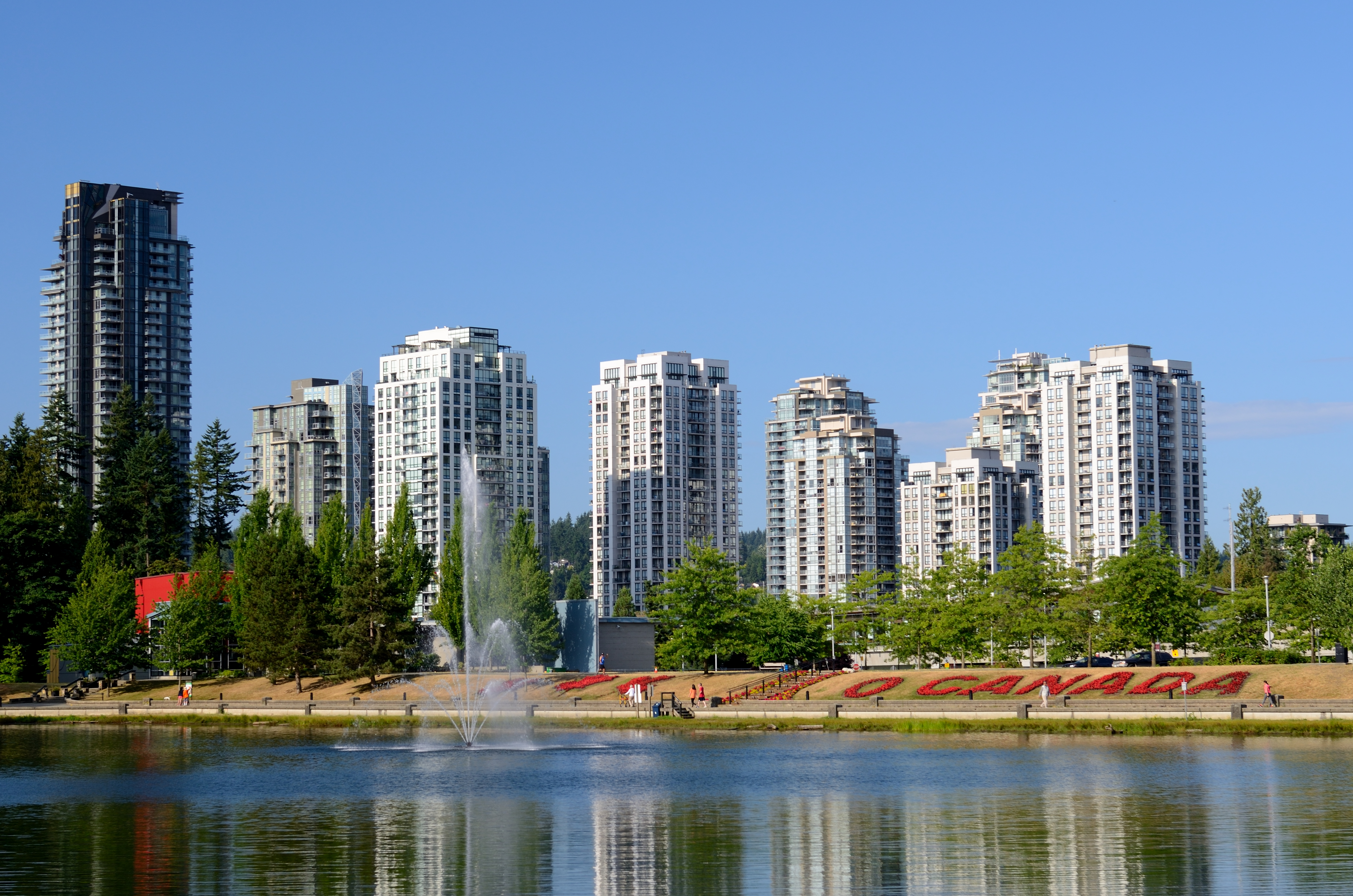
Lafarge Lake at Coquitlam Town Centre

In 1984, the provincial government sold 57 hectares (141 acres) formerly attached to Riverview Hospital to Molnar Developments. Shortly afterward, this land was subdivided and became Riverview Heights, with about 250 single-family homes. In March 2021, the Government of British Columbia announced that the Riverview lands had been renamed səmiq̓wəʔelə (pronounced suh-MEE-kwuh-EL-uh), meaning "The Place of the Great Blue Heron".

Coquitlam Town Centre is designated as a "Regional Town Centre" under Metro Vancouver's Livable Region Strategic Plan. The concept of a town centre for the area dates back to 1975, and is intended to have a high concentration of high-density housing, offices, cultural, entertainment, and education facilities to serve major growth areas of the region, served by rapid transit service. The town centre is home to many public buildings, including City Hall, a branch of the Coquitlam Public Library, the Coquitlam RCMP detachment, Coquitlam's main fire hall, the David Lam Campus of Douglas College, the Evergreen Cultural Centre, City Centre Aquatic Complex, Town Centre Park, and Percy Perry Stadium.

In 1989, the provincial government sold 570 hectares (1,409 acres) of second-growth forested land on the south slope of Eagle Mountain, known locally as Eagle Ridge, to developer Wesbild. This resulted in the closure of Westwood Motorsport Park in 1990, and the creation of Westwood Plateau, which was developed into 4,525 upscale homes, as well as two golf courses.

Following completion of development on Westwood Plateau and the opening of the David Avenue Connector in 2006, Coquitlam's primary urban development shifted towards Burke Mountain in the northeastern portion of the city. After the Evergreen Extension of the Millennium Line of the SkyTrain rapid transit system began operating in December 2016, Coquitlam's urban development focus has also shifted towards Burquitlam. The Burke Mountain area plan is now divided into four new neighbourhood plans: Lower and Upper Hyde Creek, Partington Creek, and Smiling Creek. In September 2026, the Government of Canada announced $67.4 million in federal funding towards the construction of Burke Mountain Community Centre.

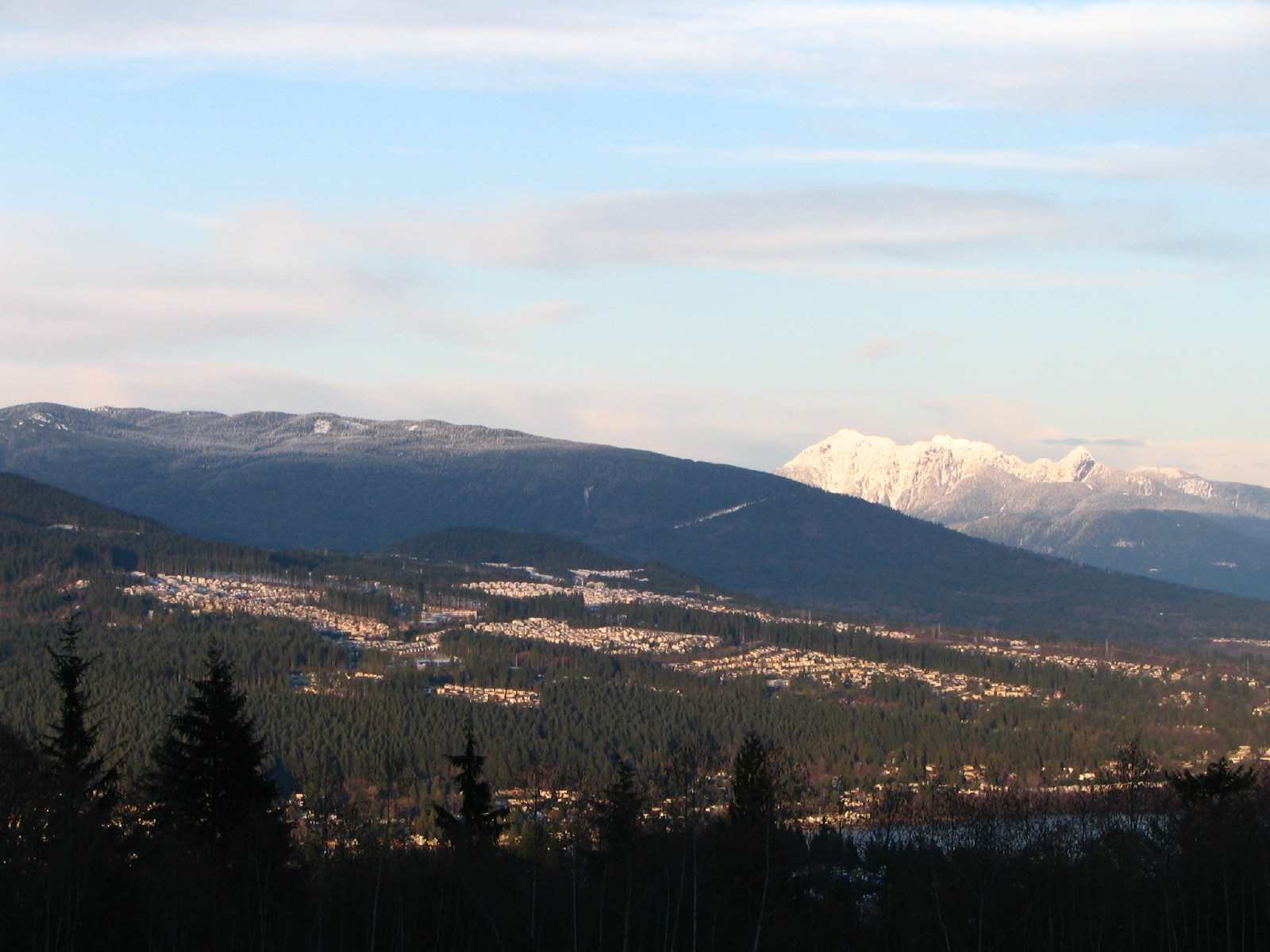
Westwood Plateau, with Burke Mountain behind it and Golden Ears Provincial Park in the distance

Coquitlam land use (2001)
| Use type | | Area |
|---|---|---|
| Agricultural land | | 381.25 ha (942.1 acres) |
| Extractive industry | | 138.00 ha (341.0 acres) |
| Harvesting and research | | 0.00 ha (0.0 acres) |
| Residential | Single family | 2,790.75 ha (6,896.1 acres) |
| Residential | Rural | 488.00 ha (1,205.9 acres) |
| Residential | Town/Low-rise | 244.00 ha (602.9 acres) |
| Residential | High-rise | 15.25 ha (37.7 acres) |
| Commercial | | 288.75 ha (713.5 acres) |
| Industrial | | 427.00 ha (1,055.1 acres) |
| Institutional | | 350.75 ha (866.7 acres) |
| Transport. comm., utilities | | 274.50 ha (678.3 acres) |
| Recreation / nature areas | | 5,429.00 ha (13,415.4 acres) |
| Open / Undeveloped | | 3,080.50 ha (7,612.1 acres) |
| GVRD Watershed | | 1,342.00 ha (3,316.2 acres) |
| Total | | 152.5 km^{2} (37,684 acres) |

=== Climate ===
Like much of Metro Vancouver, Coquitlam has an oceanic climate (Köppen climate type Cfb), experiencing mild temperatures and high precipitation; warm, dry summers and cool, wet winters. However, compared to most other cities in the area, precipitation is especially heavy in Coquitlam due to its proximity to the mountain slopes. With westward air moving off the Pacific Ocean, the air is forced to flow up the Coast Mountains causing it to cool and condense and fall as precipitation, this process is known as orographic precipitation. The orographic effect is mainly responsible for the massive 1,969 mm (77.5 in) annual average precipitation that Coquitlam receives each year, with most falling as rainfall in the fall and winter months, with 316 mm (12.4 in) in November; the summer is usually sunny with minimal precipitation with 60.7 mm (2.39 in) in July. Although the mild temperatures allow for mostly rain to fall during the winter months, occasionally snow will fall. With a slightly higher elevation compared to the rest of Metro Vancouver, Coquitlam receives an average of 64.4 cm (25.4 in) of snow each year, with it rarely staying on the ground for a few days, adding to a very intermittent snow cover during the winter season.

Coquitlam is also located in one of the warmest regions in Canada where average mean annual temperature is 10.7 °C (51.3 °F). Temperatures are warm during the summer months with an average high of 23.5 °C (74.3 °F), and an average low of 13.5 °C (56.3 °F) in August. During the winter months, the average high is 6.3 °C (43.3 °F), and the average low is 1.4 °C (34.5 °F) in January. This relatively mild climate, by Canadian standards, is caused by the warm Alaska Current offshore and the many mountain ranges preventing the cold arctic air from the rest of Canada from reaching the southwest corner of British Columbia.

On June 28, 2021, Coquitlam reached an all-time high temperature reading of 41 °C (106 °F), shattering the previous record of 37.0 °C (98.6 °F).

Climate data for Coquitlam (Burquitlam Vancouver Golf Course) (Elevation: 122m) 1981–2010
| Month | Jan | Feb | Mar | Apr | May | Jun | Jul | Aug | Sep | Oct | Nov | Dec | Year |
|---|---|---|---|---|---|---|---|---|---|---|---|---|---|
| Record high °C (°F) | 14.5 (58.1) | 17.5 (63.5) | 24.5 (76.1) | 28.0 (82.4) | 32.0 (89.6) | 41.0 (105.8) | 37.0 (98.6) | 35.0 (95.0) | 31.5 (88.7) | 26.5 (79.7) | 17.0 (62.6) | 14.5 (58.1) | 41.0 (105.8) |
| Mean daily maximum °C (°F) | 6.3 (43.3) | 8.3 (46.9) | 10.6 (51.1) | 14.3 (57.7) | 17.5 (63.5) | 20.1 (68.2) | 23.5 (74.3) | 23.5 (74.3) | 20.7 (69.3) | 14.1 (57.4) | 8.9 (48.0) | 6.2 (43.2) | 14.5 (58.1) |
| Daily mean °C (°F) | 3.8 (38.8) | 4.9 (40.8) | 7.0 (44.6) | 10.0 (50.0) | 12.9 (55.2) | 15.7 (60.3) | 18.5 (65.3) | 18.6 (65.5) | 17.0 (62.6) | 10.8 (51.4) | 6.4 (43.5) | 3.9 (39.0) | 10.7 (51.3) |
| Mean daily minimum °C (°F) | 1.4 (34.5) | 1.6 (34.9) | 3.4 (38.1) | 5.7 (42.3) | 8.3 (46.9) | 11.2 (52.2) | 13.4 (56.1) | 13.5 (56.3) | 11.3 (52.3) | 7.4 (45.3) | 3.8 (38.8) | 1.6 (34.9) | 6.9 (44.4) |
| Record low °C (°F) | −12.0 (10.4) | −13.5 (7.7) | −6.5 (20.3) | 0.0 (32.0) | 1.0 (33.8) | 6.0 (42.8) | 7.0 (44.6) | 9.0 (48.2) | 5.0 (41.0) | −4.0 (24.8) | −10.0 (14.0) | −15.5 (4.1) | −15.5 (4.1) |
| Average precipitation mm (inches) | 286.0 (11.26) | 149.7 (5.89) | 176.3 (6.94) | 137.0 (5.39) | 117.1 (4.61) | 94.7 (3.73) | 61.7 (2.43) | 72.4 (2.85) | 78.3 (3.08) | 206.9 (8.15) | 306.7 (12.07) | 250.3 (9.85) | 1,937 (76.26) |
| Average rainfall mm (inches) | 254.5 (10.02) | 140.9 (5.55) | 171.3 (6.74) | 137.0 (5.39) | 117.1 (4.61) | 94.7 (3.73) | 61.7 (2.43) | 72.4 (2.85) | 78.3 (3.08) | 206.9 (8.15) | 303.6 (11.95) | 234.5 (9.23) | 1,872.7 (73.73) |
| Average snowfall cm (inches) | 31.6 (12.4) | 8.8 (3.5) | 5.1 (2.0) | 0.0 (0.0) | 0.0 (0.0) | 0.0 (0.0) | 0.0 (0.0) | 0.0 (0.0) | 0.0 (0.0) | 0.1 (0.0) | 3.2 (1.3) | 15.8 (6.2) | 64.4 (25.4) |
| Average precipitation days (≥ 0.2 mm) | 19.8 | 14.2 | 19.1 | 15.2 | 13.9 | 12.7 | 7.7 | 6.8 | 7.7 | 16.9 | 21.1 | 19.4 | 174.3 |
| Average rainy days (≥ 0.2 mm) | 18.1 | 13.4 | 18.5 | 15.2 | 13.9 | 12.7 | 7.7 | 6.8 | 7.7 | 16.9 | 20.7 | 17.9 | 169.5 |
| Average snowy days (≥ 0.2 cm) | 3.5 | 1.7 | 1.1 | 0.0 | 0.0 | 0.0 | 0.0 | 0.0 | 0.0 | 0.06 | 1.1 | 2.7 | 10.16 |
Source: Environment and Climate Change Canada (normals, 1981–2010)

Climate data for Coquitlam (Port Moody Glenayre) (1981–2010)
| Month | Jan | Feb | Mar | Apr | May | Jun | Jul | Aug | Sep | Oct | Nov | Dec | Year |
|---|---|---|---|---|---|---|---|---|---|---|---|---|---|
| Record high °C (°F) | 16.5 (61.7) | 19.0 (66.2) | 24.0 (75.2) | 28.0 (82.4) | 34.5 (94.1) | 33.5 (92.3) | 35.0 (95.0) | 34.0 (93.2) | 32.5 (90.5) | 28.0 (82.4) | 19.0 (66.2) | 15.5 (59.9) | 35.0 (95.0) |
| Mean daily maximum °C (°F) | 6.3 (43.3) | 7.5 (45.5) | 10.2 (50.4) | 12.9 (55.2) | 16.7 (62.1) | 19.3 (66.7) | 22.2 (72.0) | 22.7 (72.9) | 19.1 (66.4) | 13.6 (56.5) | 8.3 (46.9) | 5.6 (42.1) | 13.7 (56.7) |
| Daily mean °C (°F) | 3.9 (39.0) | 4.6 (40.3) | 6.8 (44.2) | 9.1 (48.4) | 12.5 (54.5) | 15.2 (59.4) | 17.6 (63.7) | 18.1 (64.6) | 15.0 (59.0) | 10.4 (50.7) | 6.0 (42.8) | 3.3 (37.9) | 10.2 (50.4) |
| Mean daily minimum °C (°F) | 1.4 (34.5) | 1.6 (34.9) | 3.4 (38.1) | 5.3 (41.5) | 8.3 (46.9) | 11.0 (51.8) | 13.0 (55.4) | 13.4 (56.1) | 10.8 (51.4) | 7.2 (45.0) | 3.6 (38.5) | 0.9 (33.6) | 6.7 (44.1) |
| Record low °C (°F) | −14 (7) | −13 (9) | −7.8 (18.0) | −1 (30) | −1.0 (30.2) | 4.4 (39.9) | 6.5 (43.7) | 7.2 (45.0) | 1.0 (33.8) | −7 (19) | −15.5 (4.1) | −16 (3) | −16 (3) |
| Average precipitation mm (inches) | 285.0 (11.22) | 170.9 (6.73) | 185.5 (7.30) | 152.9 (6.02) | 110.8 (4.36) | 88.3 (3.48) | 60.7 (2.39) | 65.4 (2.57) | 87.2 (3.43) | 204.5 (8.05) | 316.2 (12.45) | 241.4 (9.50) | 1,968.8 (77.51) |
| Average rainfall mm (inches) | 266.9 (10.51) | 161.4 (6.35) | 179.5 (7.07) | 152.7 (6.01) | 110.8 (4.36) | 88.3 (3.48) | 60.7 (2.39) | 65.4 (2.57) | 87.2 (3.43) | 204.4 (8.05) | 310.1 (12.21) | 225.8 (8.89) | 1,913.2 (75.32) |
| Average snowfall cm (inches) | 18.0 (7.1) | 9.5 (3.7) | 6.0 (2.4) | 0.2 (0.1) | 0 (0) | 0 (0) | 0 (0) | 0 (0) | 0 (0) | 0.2 (0.1) | 6.1 (2.4) | 15.6 (6.1) | 55.6 (21.9) |
| Average precipitation days (≥ 0.2 mm) | 19.1 | 14.7 | 17.6 | 15.1 | 14.0 | 12.0 | 7.7 | 6.8 | 9.0 | 16.3 | 20.0 | 18.1 | 170.4 |
| Average rainy days (≥ 0.2 mm) | 18.0 | 13.9 | 17.3 | 15.1 | 14.0 | 12.0 | 7.7 | 6.8 | 9.0 | 16.2 | 19.7 | 16.9 | 166.5 |
| Average snowy days (≥ 0.2 cm) | 2.1 | 1.9 | 0.92 | 0.12 | 0 | 0 | 0 | 0 | 0 | 0.09 | 1.1 | 2.7 | 8.9 |
Source: Environment and Climate Change Canada

Climate data for Coquitlam (Como Lake Ave)(Elevation:160 m) 1981–2010
| Month | Jan | Feb | Mar | Apr | May | Jun | Jul | Aug | Sep | Oct | Nov | Dec | Year |
|---|---|---|---|---|---|---|---|---|---|---|---|---|---|
| Average precipitation mm (inches) | 277.7 (10.93) | 181.6 (7.15) | 169.7 (6.68) | 141.6 (5.57) | 112.7 (4.44) | 88.5 (3.48) | 59.8 (2.35) | 66.4 (2.61) | 75.8 (2.98) | 190.4 (7.50) | 308.5 (12.15) | 250.1 (9.85) | 1,922.8 (75.70) |
| Average rainfall mm (inches) | 253.4 (9.98) | 170.2 (6.70) | 165.6 (6.52) | 141.1 (5.56) | 112.6 (4.43) | 88.4 (3.48) | 59.1 (2.33) | 66.4 (2.61) | 75.8 (2.98) | 190.1 (7.48) | 302.7 (11.92) | 230.2 (9.06) | 1,855.6 (73.05) |
| Average snowfall cm (inches) | 24.3 (9.6) | 11.4 (4.5) | 4.1 (1.6) | 0.5 (0.2) | 0.1 (0.0) | 0.1 (0.0) | 0.7 (0.3) | 0.0 (0.0) | 0.0 (0.0) | 0.3 (0.1) | 5.8 (2.3) | 20.0 (7.9) | 67.3 (26.5) |
| Average precipitation days (≥ 0.2 mm) | 20.0 | 14.7 | 17.4 | 15.2 | 14.2 | 12.5 | 7.4 | 6.8 | 8.0 | 15.0 | 19.9 | 20.0 | 171.0 |
| Average rainy days (≥ 0.2 mm) | 17.8 | 13.8 | 16.9 | 15.2 | 14.2 | 12.5 | 7.4 | 6.8 | 8.0 | 14.9 | 19.4 | 18.3 | 165.1 |
| Average snowy days (≥ 0.2 cm) | 3.6 | 1.7 | 1.1 | 0.14 | 0.05 | 0.05 | 0.05 | 0.0 | 0.0 | 0.09 | 1.1 | 3.8 | 11.6 |
Source: Environment and Climate Change Canada

== Demographics ==
Historical populations
| Year | Pop. | ±% |
|---|---|---|
| 1921 | 2,374 | — |
| 1931 | 4,871 | +105.2% |
| 1941 | 7,949 | +63.2% |
| 1951 | 15,697 | +97.5% |
| 1956 | 20,800 | +32.5% |
| 1961 | 29,053 | +39.7% |
| 1966 | 40,916 | +40.8% |
| 1971 | 53,073 | +29.7% |
| 1976 | 55,464 | +4.5% |
| 1981 | 61,077 | +10.1% |
| 1986 | 69,291 | +13.4% |
| 1991 | 84,021 | +21.3% |
| 1996 | 101,820 | +21.2% |
| 2001 | 112,890 | +10.9% |
| 2006 | 114,565 | +1.5% |
| 2011 | 126,840 | +10.7% |
| 2016 | 139,284 | +9.8% |
| 2021 | 148,625 | +6.7% |

In the 2021 Census of Population conducted by Statistics Canada, Coquitlam had a population of 148,625 living in 55,949 of its 58,683 total private dwellings, a change of 6.7% from its 2016 population of 139,284. With a land area of 122.15 km^{2} (47.16 sq mi), it had a population density of 1,216.7/km^{2} (3,151.3/sq mi) in 2021.

According to the 2016 Census, 47% of households contained a married couple with children, 30% contained a married couple without children, and 22% were one-person households. Of the 40,085 reported families: 76% were married couples with an average of 3.0 persons per family, 15% were lone-parents with an average of 2.5 persons per family, and 9% were common-law couples with an average of 2.6 persons per family. The median age of Coquitlam's population was 41.1 years, slightly younger than the British Columbia median of 43.0 years. Coquitlam had 85.6% of its residents 15 years of age or older, less than the provincial average of 87.5%.

According to the 2016 census, about 44% of Coquitlam residents were foreign-born, much higher than the 28% foreign-born for the whole of British Columbia. The same census documented the median income in 2015 for all families was $65,020, compared to the provincial average of $61,280. 58.2% of respondents 15 years of age and older claim to have a post-secondary certificate, diploma or degree, compared to 55% province-wide. Lastly, also as of the 2016 census, only 23.4% of Coquitlam residents who work outside the home work within the city of Coquitlam itself, just less than half the provincial average of 48.9% of residents who work within their own municipality, yet 22.2% of Coquitlam residents take public transit, bicycle or walk to work, close to the provincial average of 22.4%.

=== Ethnicity ===
Panethnic groups in the City of Coquitlam (2001−2021)
| Panethnic group | 2021 | | 2016 | | 2011 | | 2006 | | 2001 | |
| Panethnic group | Pop. | % | Pop. | % | Pop. | % | Pop. | % | Pop. | % |
|---|---|---|---|---|---|---|---|---|---|---|
| European (Note: Statistic includes all persons that did not make up part of a visible minority or an aboriginal identity.) | 61,220 | 41.51% | 65,730 | 47.6% | 67,655 | 54.12% | 68,120 | 59.99% | 71,755 | 64.4% |
| East Asian (Note: Statistic includes total responses of "Chinese", "Korean", and "Japanese" under visible minority section on census.) | 46,375 | 31.45% | 40,400 | 29.26% | 30,715 | 24.57% | 26,710 | 23.52% | 25,030 | 22.46% |
| Middle Eastern (Note: Statistic includes total responses of "West Asian" and "Arab" under visible minority section on census.) | 12,080 | 8.19% | 9,140 | 6.62% | 7,375 | 5.9% | 4,885 | 4.3% | 2,965 | 2.66% |
| Southeast Asian (Note: Statistic includes total responses of "Filipino" and "Southeast Asian" under visible minority section on census.) | 7,675 | 5.2% | 7,205 | 5.22% | 6,415 | 5.13% | 4,110 | 3.62% | 3,710 | 3.33% |
| South Asian | 7,405 | 5.02% | 6,220 | 4.5% | 5,245 | 4.2% | 4,185 | 3.69% | 3,280 | 2.94% |
| Latin American | 3,345 | 2.27% | 2,190 | 1.59% | 1,895 | 1.52% | 1,530 | 1.35% | 1,110 | 1% |
| Indigenous | 2,915 | 1.98% | 3,095 | 2.24% | 2,610 | 2.09% | 1,565 | 1.38% | 1,480 | 1.33% |
| African | 2,135 | 1.45% | 1,515 | 1.1% | 1,265 | 1.01% | 1,005 | 0.88% | 1,130 | 1.01% |
| Other/multiracial (Note: Statistic includes total responses of "Visible minority, n.i.e." and "Multiple visible minorities" under visible minority section on census.) | 4,300 | 2.92% | 2,590 | 1.88% | 1,840 | 1.47% | 1,455 | 1.28% | 970 | 0.87% |
| Total responses | 147,465 | 99.22% | 138,095 | 99.15% | 125,015 | 98.56% | 113,560 | 99.12% | 111,425 | 98.7% |
| Total population | 148,625 | 100% | 139,284 | 100% | 126,840 | 100% | 114,565 | 100% | 112,890 | 100% |
Note: Totals greater than 100% due to multiple origin responses

=== Languages ===
The 2021 census found that English was spoken as the mother tongue of 47.5% of the population. The next most common mother tongue language was Mandarin, spoken by 9.7% of the population, followed by Korean at 6.8%. The south slope of Coquitlam, which includes Maillardville, has a pocket of French speakers.

| Rank (2021) | Mother tongue | Population | Percentage |
|---|---|---|---|
| 1 | English | 70,195 | 47.5% |
| 2 | Mandarin | 14,380 | 9.7% |
| 3 | Korean | 10,040 | 6.8% |
| 4 | Cantonese | 9,670 | 6.5% |
| 5 | Persian (including Dari) | 8,920 | 6.0% |
| 6 | Spanish | 2,825 | 1.9% |
| 7 | Tagalog | 2,510 | 1.7% |
| 8 | Russian | 2,310 | 1.6% |
| 9 | French | 1,295 | 0.9% |
| 10 | Arabic | 1,255 | 0.8% |
| 10 | Punjabi | 1,255 | 0.8% |
| 12 | Italian | 1,195 | 0.8% |
| 13 | Portuguese | 1,100 | 0.7% |

=== Religion ===
According to the 2021 census, religious groups in Coquitlam included:

- Irreligion (73,945 persons or 50.1%)
- Christianity (55,150 persons or 37.4%)
- Islam (9,315 persons or 6.3%)
- Buddhism (3,110 persons or 2.1%)
- Hinduism (1,955 persons or 1.3%)
- Sikhism (1,855 persons or 1.3%)
- Judaism (405 persons or 0.3%)
- Indigenous Spirituality (45 persons or <0.1%)

Religious groups in the City of Coquitlam (1991−2021)
| Religious group | 2021 Canadian census | | 2011 Canadian census | | 2001 Canadian census | | 1991 Canadian census | |
| Religious group | Pop. | % | Pop. | % | Pop. | % | Pop. | % |
|---|---|---|---|---|---|---|---|---|
| Irreligion | 73,945 | 50.14% | 50,315 | 40.25% | 38,825 | 34.84% | 25,395 | 30.82% |
| Christianity | 55,150 | 37.4% | 61,075 | 48.85% | 63,025 | 56.56% | 53,680 | 65.14% |
| Islam | 9,315 | 6.32% | 6,475 | 5.18% | 3,475 | 3.12% | 995 | 1.21% |
| Buddhism | 3,110 | 2.11% | 2,540 | 2.03% | 2,980 | 2.67% | 750 | 0.91% |
| Hinduism | 1,955 | 1.33% | 1,115 | 0.89% | 790 | 0.71% | 470 | 0.57% |
| Sikhism | 1,855 | 1.26% | 1,430 | 1.14% | 985 | 0.88% | 625 | 0.76% |
| Judaism | 405 | 0.27% | 560 | 0.45% | 415 | 0.37% | 180 | 0.22% |
| Indigenous spirituality | 45 | 0.03% | 15 | 0.01% | 65 | 0.06% | —N/a | —N/a |
| Other | 1,685 | 1.14% | 1,485 | 1.19% | 865 | 0.78% | 305 | 0.37% |
| Total responses | 147,465 | 99.22% | 125,015 | 98.86% | 111,425 | 98.7% | 82,405 | 98.08% |
| Total population | 148,625 | 100% | 126,456 | 100% | 112,890 | 100% | 84,021 | 100% |

== Economy ==
As a bedroom community, the majority of Coquitlam residents commute to work in Vancouver, Burnaby, and other Metro Vancouver suburbs. Coquitlam's main industrial area lies in the southern Maillardville/Fraser Mills area near the Fraser River. Among the largest employers within Coquitlam are the municipality itself with more than 2,000 employees, Real Canadian Superstore with appoximately 690 employees, IKEA with approximately 500 employees, and Great Canadian Casino Vancouver with approximately 400 employees. According to the 2021 census, the city accomodates a total of 62,300 jobs, accounting for 4.7% of all jobs in the region.

In 2007, there were 610 retail businesses in Coquitlam, and these provided 8,765 jobs (27% of all jobs) within the city. Most retail businesses are concentrated around Coquitlam Centre in the Town Centre area, and big-box retailers such as IKEA and The Home Depot in the Pacific Reach areas, with the remainder of the city's retail outlets centered around the Austin Heights and North Road sectors.

The Tri-Cities Chamber of Commerce has over 1,300 members including businesses, professionals, residents and other community groups, governed by a 13-person volunteer Board of Directors.

== Arts and culture ==
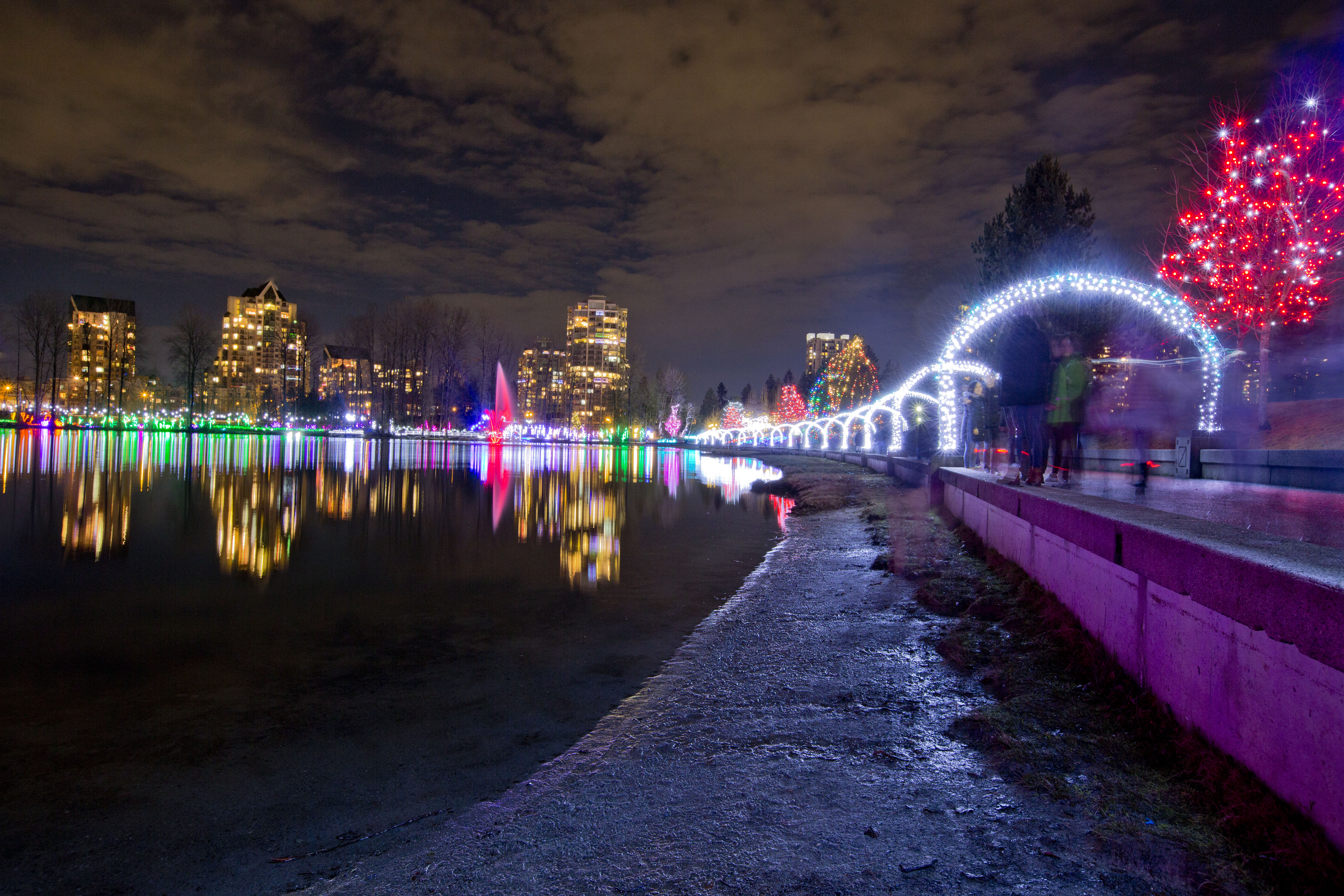
Reflections of the city skyline at the "Lights at Lafarge" festival

Being in close proximity to Vancouver and surrounded by the rest of the Lower Mainland, Coquitlam residents have access to virtually unlimited choice in cultural and leisure activities. Within the city itself are numerous venues that bring these choices closer to home.

Coquitlam was designated as a Cultural Capital of Canada in 2009 by the Department of Canadian Heritage.

=== Arts and entertainment ===
The Molson Canadian Theatre, a 1,074-seat multi-purpose venue, opened as part of a $30 million expansion to Coquitlam's Hard Rock Casino in 2006, while Cineplex Entertainment operates the 4,475-seat SilverCity Coquitlam movie complex with 20 screens.

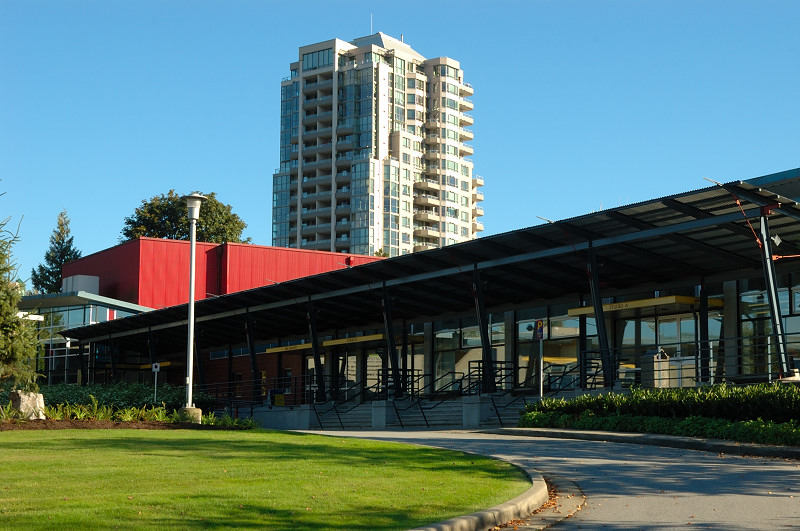
Evergreen Cultural Centre

A partnership of the city, the arts community, private business and senior governments, the Evergreen Cultural Centre in the Town Centre area is a venue for arts and culture, a civic facility designed to host a wide variety of community events. It features a 264-seat black box theatre, rehearsal hall, art studios and art gallery. Evergreen serves as the home venue for the Pacific Symphonic Wind Ensemble, the Coastal Sound Music Academy, the Coquitlam Youth Orchestra, and the Stage 43 Theatrical Society. Nearby proscenium theatres include the 336-seat Terry Fox Theatre in Port Coquitlam, and the 206-seat Inlet Theatre in Port Moody.

Numerous yearly festivals are staged at various locations throughout Coquitlam, including Festival du Bois (first full weekend in March), the Water's Edge Festival (third full weekend in March), Como Lake Fishing Derby (last Sunday in May), BC Highland Games (last Saturday in June), a Canada Day Celebration at Town Centre Park, the BC Dumpling Festival (mid-August), and the Blue Mountain Music Festival (mid-July).

== Attractions ==
=== Parks and community ===
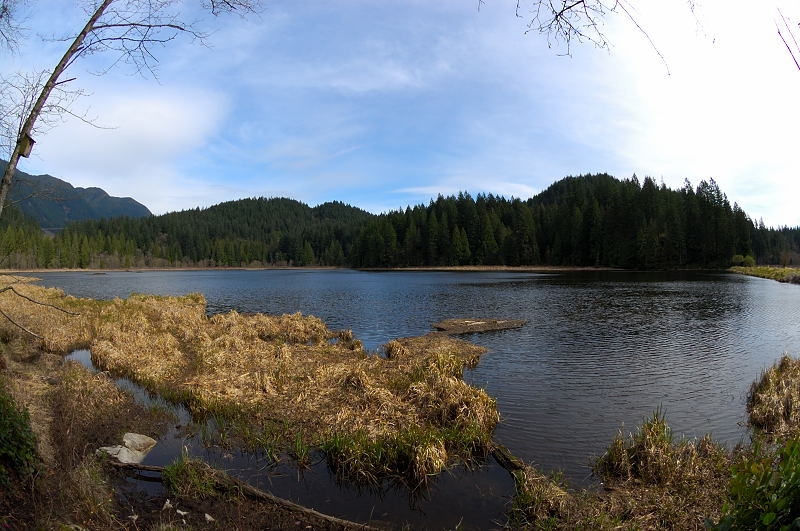
Minnekhada Regional Park

Coquitlam has a considerable number of open green spaces, with a total area reaching over 890 hectares (2,200 acres). There are over 80 municipal parks and natural areas, with Mundy Park located roughly in the centre of the city being the biggest, and Ridge Park located in the highlands near the city's northern edge. Pinecone Burke Provincial Park, Minnekhada Regional Park, and Pitt Addington Marsh are on the northern and eastern border of the city, while the restricted area of Metro Vancouver's Coquitlam watershed borders Coquitlam to the north. Colony Farm is a 404-hectare (1,000-acre) park that straddles the boundary of Coquitlam and Port Coquitlam, offering walking trails rich with wildlife and gardens. Town Centre Park is a large city park located in the central area of the city, providing city residents with many recreational activities. Como Lake Park and Glen Park are also popular with local residents.

Place des Arts is a non-profit teaching arts centre in Maillardville founded in 1972, offering programs in visual arts, music, acting, and dance. It features specialized programs for school students and home learners, and presents concerts and exhibitions for the public. Studios are offered for pottery, fibre arts, yoga, ballet, drama, piano, drawing and painting. Place des Arts offers four faculty concerts throughout the year, as well as numerous recitals and presentations by students on an ongoing basis.

Place Maillardville is a community centre providing leisure activities for all age groups, with programs on French language, culture, as well as physical activities. Heritage Square offers visitors a wealth of historic sites, gardens, a bike path, and an outdoor amphitheatre; it is also home to the Mackin Heritage Home & Toy Museum.

The city maintains numerous sports and recreation fields, including 40 grass/sand/soil sports fields, five FieldTurf fields, 35 ball diamonds, several all-weather surfaces, a bowling green, a croquet/bocce court, and a cricket pitch. The city also operates Percy Perry Stadium and the Poirier Sport & Leisure Complex. Privately owned Planet Ice features four ice rinks, and more rinks are found throughout the Tri-Cities.

== Sports ==
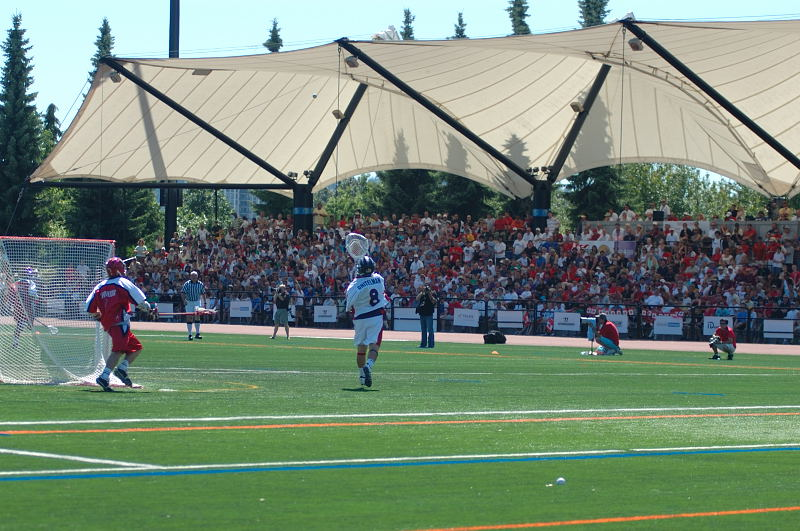
The 2008 Men's U-19 World Lacrosse Championships at Percy Perry Stadium

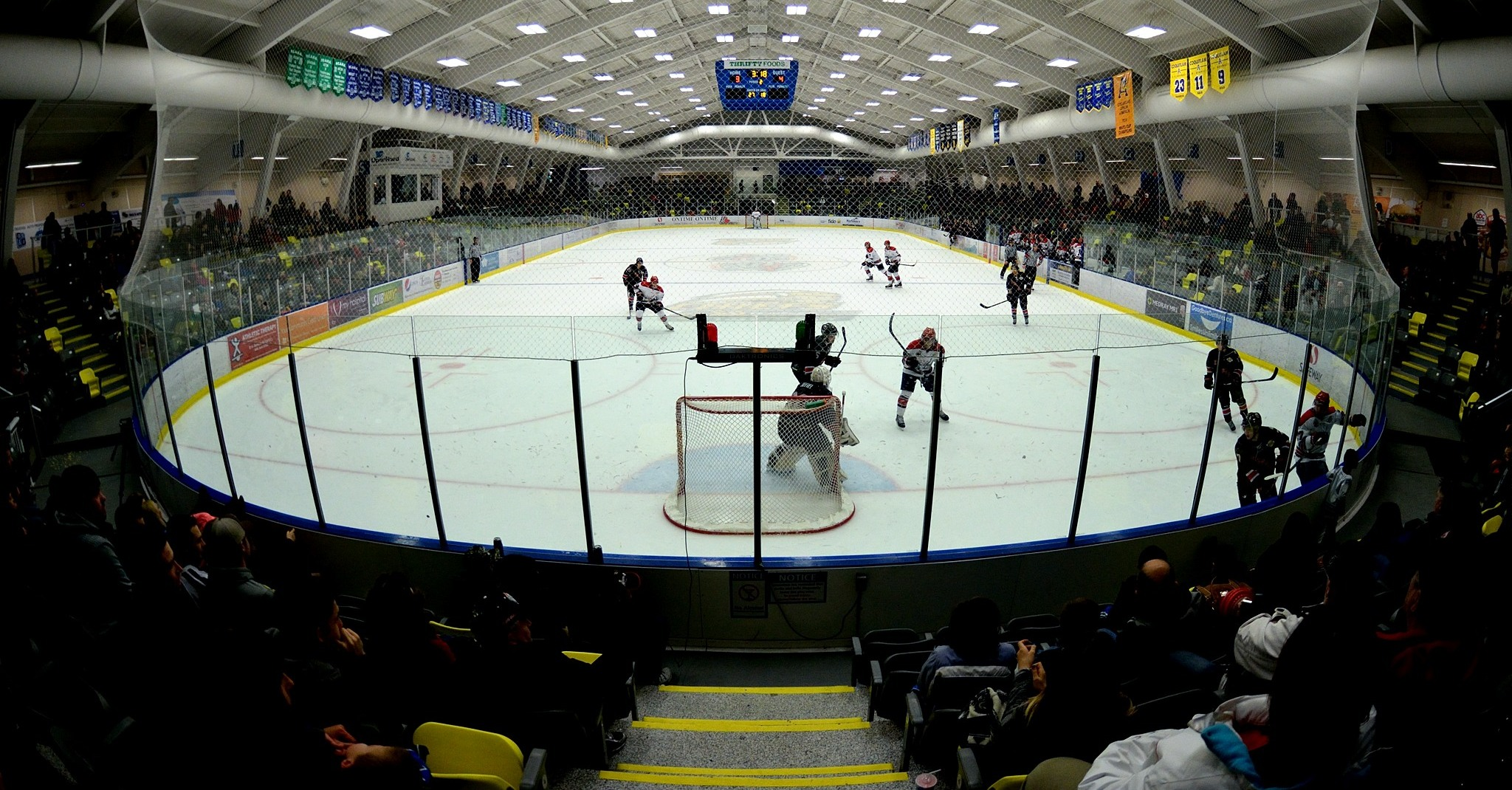
Coquitlam Express hockey at the Poirier Sport & Leisure Complex

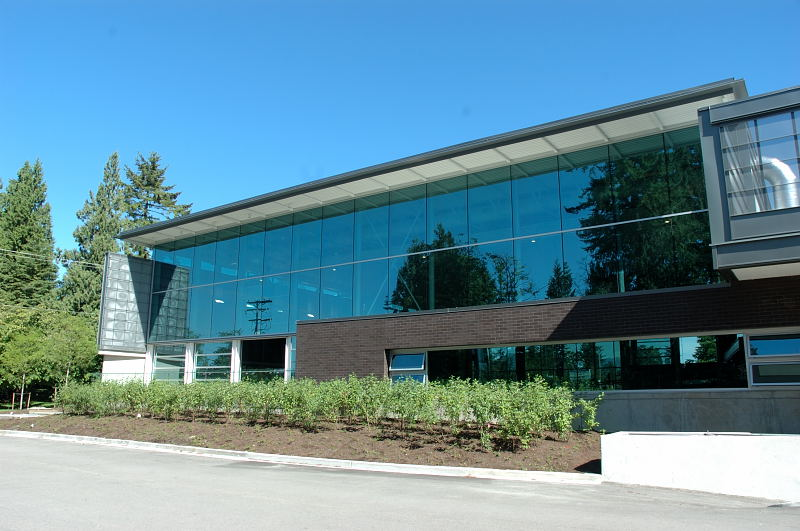
Chimo Aquatic and Fitness Centre

There exists many opportunities for a wide variety of activities in Coquitlam:

- Baseball – The Coquitlam Reds of the B.C. Premier Baseball League play their home games at Mundy Park; the Reds' most famous alumnus is former Major League All-Star and National League MVP Larry Walker. Coquitlam is also home to Coquitlam Little League, which has been part of Little League International since 1955; Coquitlam finished 3rd at the 1984 Little League World Series. In 2008, Coquitlam hosted the Junior League Canadian Championships.
- Basketball – Coquitlam is home to the Tri-City Youth Basketball Association; formed in 1999, it serves the Tri-Cities with over 1,400 players from grades 2 to 9. The program is part of the Steve Nash Youth Basketball program administered by Basketball BC. It is open to both boys and girls, and operates out of school gyms across the Tri-Cities area.
- Cricket – Coquitlam is home to the Windies Cricket Club. The club consists of over 40 members with 3 adult teams playing in the Premier, Second & Fifth Divisions. The club is affiliated with the British Columbia Mainland Cricket League and games are played at Mackin Park. A youth Kanga Cricket Program was formed with the aim of promoting and growing the game of cricket in Coquitlam. The SuperStrikers cricket team is open to boys and girls aged 6 – 16.
- CrossFit – The regional CanWest CrossFit games have been held in the Percy Perry Stadium since 2016.
- Football – Coquitlam is home to the Coquitlam Minor Football Association, which is a member of the Vancouver Mainland Football League. CMFA players range from 6 to 18 years of age, and play against teams from the Lower Mainland and Vancouver Island. Coquitlam was also the home of the Tri-City Bulldogs of the Canadian Junior Football League from 1991 to 2004.
- Golf – In addition to courses in neighbouring communities in the Tri-Cities, Coquitlam itself is home to several golf facilities. The Vancouver Golf Club, located in southwest Coquitlam, has hosted four major LPGA tour events as well as one Senior PGA Tour event. The Westwood Plateau Golf & Country Club is one of the highest rated golf courses in Canada. Both the Westwood Plateau Golf Academy and Eaglequest Golf Centre are designed as executive learning courses.
- Hockey – Founded in 2001, the Coquitlam Express of the British Columbia Hockey League play at the Poirier Sport & Leisure Complex. Coquitlam is also home to the Coquitlam Minor Hockey Association, a AAA club in the Greater Vancouver area in the Pacific Coast Division, with almost 1000 members from Initiation Hockey 1 to Juvenile.
- Lacrosse – Coquitlam is home to the Coquitlam Adanacs of the Western Lacrosse Association, who play at the Poirier Sport & Leisure Complex, and to the Coquitlam Minor Lacrosse Association. Percy Perry Stadium hosted both the 2008 and 2016 World Lacrosse Men's U-19 Championships.
- Motorsports – Coquitlam was formerly home to Westwood Motorsport Park, Canada's first purpose-built permanent road course, located on what is now Westwood Plateau. The first race was held in 1959, and over the years hosted many different professional series including Formula Atlantic and Trans-Am. Notable drivers to have raced at Westwood include Formula One World Champion Keke Rosberg, Indianapolis 500 winners Bobby Rahal and Danny Sullivan, Gilles Villeneuve and Michael Andretti, and Greg Moore. The track finally closed in 1990 due to encroaching development, and racing moved to Mission Raceway Park.
- Rugby – The city is home to the United Rugby Club which claimed the BC Rugby Under 23 championship in 2018. The club has two senior men's team and one senior women's team, as well, the team has age grade programs from its mini's program for elementary school children to U-16 and U-19 teams.
- Soccer – The city is home to two major soccer associations, including the Coquitlam Metro-Ford Soccer Club which has over 2500 players ranging from Under-5 to adult teams including the Women's Premier team which plays in the Pacific Coast Soccer League, and the North Coquitlam United Soccer Club.
- Softball – Coquitlam is home to the Coquitlam Minor Softball Association. This association consists of about 300 registered players, predominantly females between the ages of 5 – 19 years of age. Most of the games are held at Mundy Park, Riverview Park, and Hillcrest Park. The CMSA is home to the Coquitlam Classics competitive rep program.
- Swimming – City Centre Aquatic Complex is an indoor aquatic centre built in the Town Centre area at a cost of $8.2 million and opened in 1994. It features a 50m Olympic size swimming pool, wave pool, waterslide, 3,000-square-foot (280 m^{2}) fitness centre, and physiotherapy clinic. The Chimo Aquatic and Fitness Centre (CAFC) opened in 2008 in the Austin Heights area at a cost of $19.5 million, replacing the older Chimo Pool nearby. It features a 25m swimming pool, a 20m lap pool, leisure pool, and fitness room. Coquitlam also operates three outdoor swimming pools (Eagle Ridge, Rochester, Spani), two outdoor wading pools (Blue Mountain, Mackin), and three outdoor splash pads (Blue Mountain, Panorama, Town Centre).
- Track and field – Coquitlam is home to the Coquitlam Cheetahs track and field club, who train at Percy Perry Stadium, which was named after their former coach who died in 2005.
- Water Polo – Coquitlam is home to a number of water polo clubs. In the summer the Coquitlam Sharks, members of the BCSSA, have a water polo component, and during the year, from October to April, the Coquitlam Lions, a recreational water polo club, have practices at the various pools from October to April: CCAC, Poirier and Eagle Ridge. In addition, Pacific Storm, a high performance water polo club, also holds some of its practices at CCAC as well as their Tournament of Courage, held every January.

== Government ==
=== Federal ===
Coquitlam is represented by two federal MPs in the Parliament of Canada. Zoe Royer (Liberal Party) represents the Port Moody—Coquitlam riding, while Ron McKinnon (Liberal Party) represents Coquitlam—Port Coquitlam.

=== Provincial ===
Coquitlam is represented by four provincial MLAs in the Legislative Assembly of British Columbia. John McEwen (Conservative Party of British Columbia) represents the Port Moody-Burquitlam riding, while Ryan Peterson (BC Conservative) represents Coquitlam-Burke Mountain, Jennifer Whiteside (British Columbia NDP) represents New Westminster-Coquitlam, and Matt Liang (BC Conservative) represents Coquitlam-Maillardville.

=== Municipal ===
In the 2026 civic election, Craig Hodge was elected as mayor of Coquitlam, and Matt Djonlic, Robert Mazzarolo, Steve Kim, Teri Towner, Matthew Sebastiani, Harvey Su, Rosalinda Thorleifson, and Benjamin Perry were all elected to Coquitlam City Council. Coquitlam contracts out garbage and recycling services to International Paper Industries for city residents, but local businesses are responsible for their own garbage and recycling arrangements. Coquitlam Lake provides residents with a mountain-fed water source, while the city maintains its own sewage management system.

=== Judicial ===
The nearest Supreme Court of British Columbia venue is the New Westminster Law Courts. Provincial Court of British Columbia cases were formerly handled through the Coquitlam Provincial Court, but this was closed in 1996 and moved to the new Port Coquitlam Provincial Court.

== Transportation ==
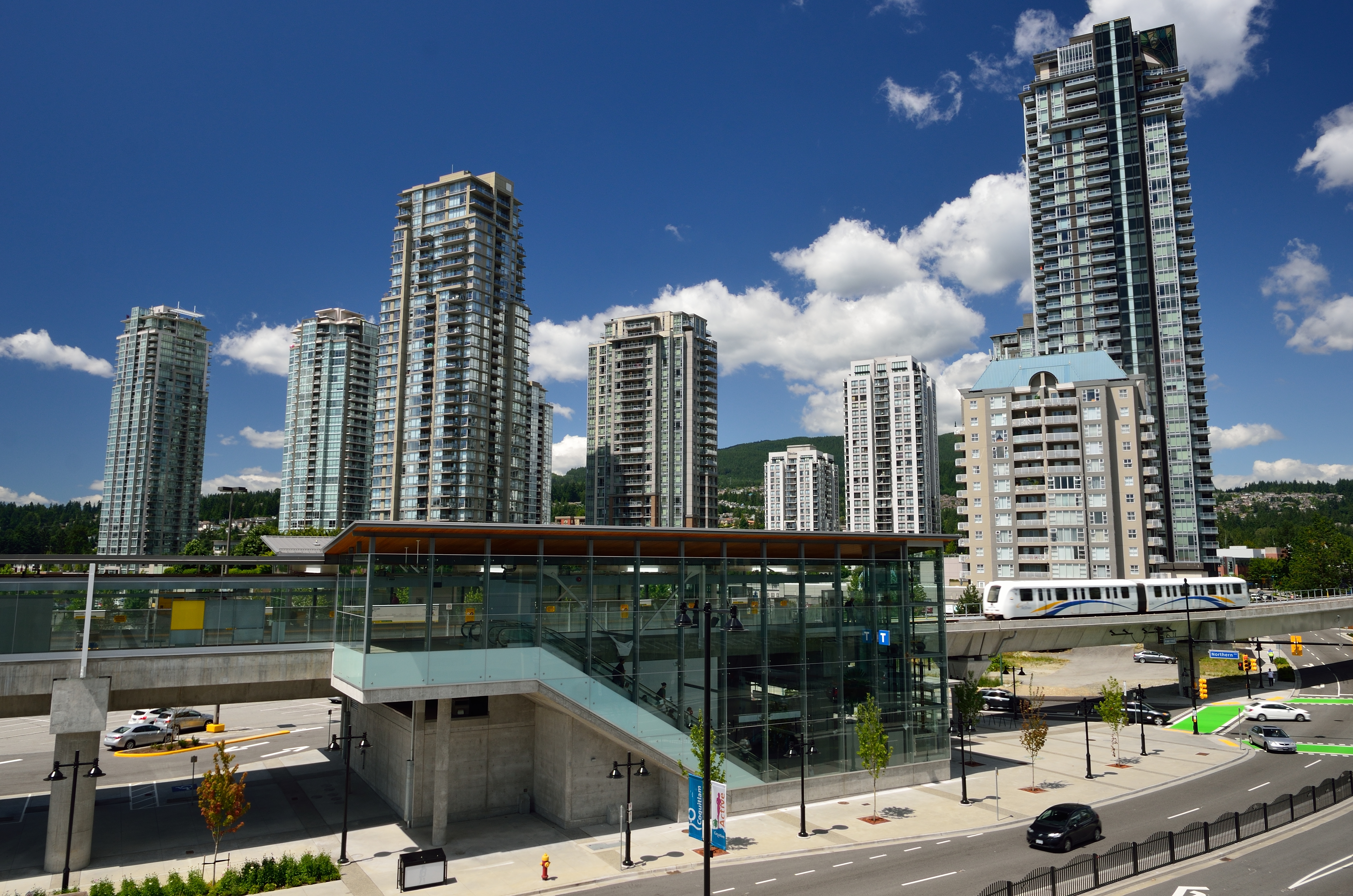
SkyTrain pulls out of Lincoln station.

Coquitlam is served by TransLink, which is responsible for both public transit and major roads.

The city has four SkyTrain stations on the Millennium Line that are a part of the 10.9 km (6.8 mi) long Evergreen Extension. With a project cost of $1.4 billion, the line runs from the Coquitlam City Centre area, through Coquitlam Central Station and into Port Moody, re-entering Coquitlam on North Road and finally joining the existing Millennium Line at Lougheed Town Centre.

There is regular bus service on numerous lines running throughout the city and connecting it to other municipalities in Metro Vancouver, with a major exchange at Coquitlam Central Station.

The West Coast Express, with a stop at Coquitlam Central Station, provides commuter rail service west to downtown Vancouver and east as far as Mission. WCE operates Monday to Friday only (excluding holidays), with five trains per day running to Vancouver in the morning peak hours and returning through Coquitlam in the evening peak hours.

For motorists, the Trans-Canada Highway provides freeway access to Burnaby, Vancouver, Surrey, and other municipalities in the Lower Mainland. Lougheed Highway is an alternative route to the Trans-Canada, entering Coquitlam through Maillardville, past the Riverview Hospital area, up to Coquitlam Centre where it turns sharply east to Port Coquitlam. Barnet Highway begins at the Coquitlam Centre area and heads directly east through Port Moody and on to Burnaby and downtown Vancouver.

Coquitlam has 60 km of bike routes, including dedicated bike lanes on Guildford Way, David Avenue, United Boulevard, Mariner Way, Chilko Drive and others, plus additional routes through city parks.

Coquitlam is served by two international airports. Vancouver International Airport, located on Sea Island in the city of Richmond to the west, is the second busiest in Canada and provides most of the air access to the region. Abbotsford International Airport, located to the east, is the seventeenth busiest airport in Canada. Nearby Pitt Meadows Airport provides services for smaller aircraft and there are also Boundary Bay Airport and Langley Airport for small aircraft.

Residents and visitors wishing to travel to Vancouver Island, the Gulf Islands, and other destinations along the Inside Passage may use the BC Ferries car and passenger ferry service from two terminals in the communities of Tsawwassen and Horseshoe Bay, south and north of Vancouver respectively. BC Ferries operates the Queen of Coquitlam, a C-class ferry capable of carrying 316 cars and 1,494 passengers, which was launched in 1976. She received an $18 million rehabilitation in November 2002, and currently operates on the Departure Bay-Horseshoe Bay and Langdale-Horseshoe Bay routes. BC Ferries plans to retire the Queen of Coquitlam by 2031 as part of their New Major Vessels Project.

== Infrastructure ==
=== Health care ===
Eagle Ridge Hospital

Coquitlam is served by Fraser Health, which operates the 168-bed Eagle Ridge Hospital on the Port Moody/Coquitlam city boundary. The hospital opened its doors in 1984 and operates a 24-hour emergency department, as well as ambulatory, long-term, and acute care programs. It is a Centre of Excellence for elective surgery for urology, gynaecology, plastics and orthopedics. The hospital also offers public education clinics for asthma and diabetes, rehabilitation services, and programs for cardiology, children's grief recovery, youth crisis response, and early psychosis prevention.

Fraser Health also operates the 675-bed Royal Columbian Hospital just south of Coquitlam in New Westminster, and subsidizes a total of 536 residential care beds across 6 facilities in Coquitlam. Coquitlam residents are also served by many privately-owned medical clinics and doctors' offices.

Coquitlam was also the home of Riverview Hospital, a large mental health facility which opened in 1913 and housed 4,630 patients at its peak, before closing in 2012. Following Riverview's closure, the fate of its 99-hectare (240-acre) site remains an ongoing area of public debate, and has been the subject of much controversy amongst developers, politicians, environmentalists, and First Nations groups. In 2014, the city announced their plan to use the lands and buildings as a "Coquitlam Health Campus" including an acute-care and psychiatric hospital. In October 2021, the Red Fish Healing Centre for Mental Health and Addiction opened to patients on the Riverview grounds. Currently, the kʷikʷəƛ̓əm First Nation and BC Housing are working together on a long-term master plan for further development of the site.

=== Police, fire, and emergency services ===
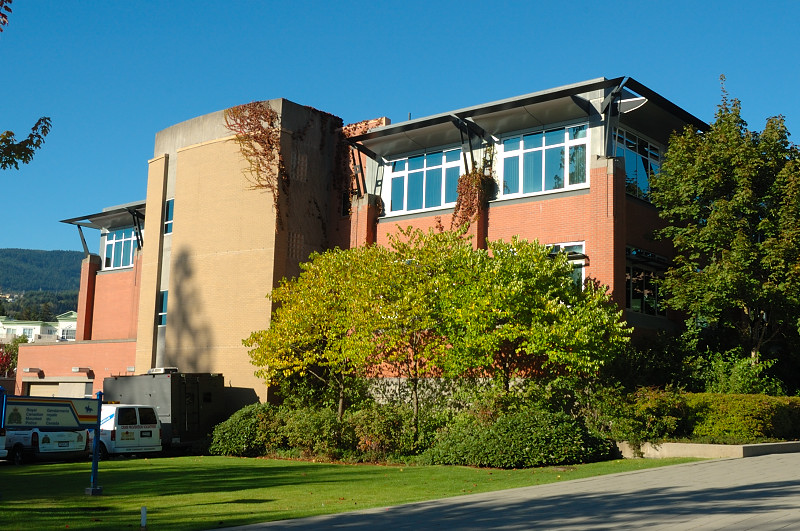
Coquitlam RCMP's Main Detachment Building

Coquitlam contracts out its police service to the Royal Canadian Mounted Police, with the main police station adjacent to City Hall at Coquitlam Town Centre and community police stations in the Austin Heights and Burquitlam areas. The Coquitlam RCMP detachment also serves the municipalities of Anmore, Belcarra, and Port Coquitlam.

Coquitlam operates its own fire service, known as Coquitlam Fire/Rescue Services, with four fire halls. The fire halls are Town Centre, Austin Heights, Mariner Way, and Burke Mountain.

Like all other municipalities in British Columbia, Coquitlam's ambulance service is provided by the British Columbia Ambulance Service.

Coquitlam Search and Rescue is a volunteer search and rescue team operating under the Provincial Emergency Program. Coquitlam SAR is responsible for urban and wilderness search and rescue for the area between Indian Arm and Pitt Lake, and encompasses the local communities of Coquitlam, Burnaby, Port Coquitlam, Port Moody, New Westminster, Belcarra and Anmore. The SAR team is based at Town Centre Fire Hall.

=== Community centres ===
The city manages four all-ages community centres (Centennial, Pinetree, Poirier, Summit), and two senior community centres (Dogwood Pavilion, Glen Pine Pavilion).

== Education ==
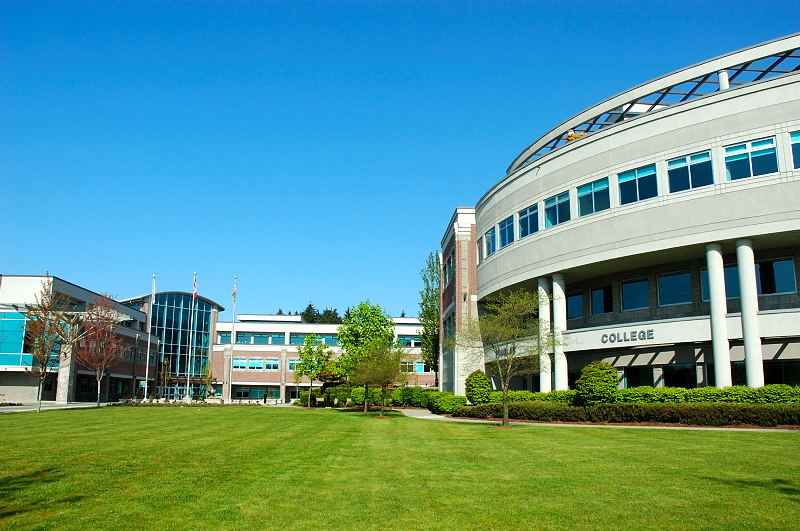
Douglas College

Coquitlam is served by School District 43 Coquitlam, which runs five public secondary schools(plus one alternative school), seven middle schools, and 27 elementary schools within the city. The new Burke Mountain Middle/Secondary School is slated to open for the 2027 school year. Francophone education in the Tri-Cities is offered by Conseil Scolaire Francophone de la Colombie-Britannique.

Coquitlam Town Centre is home to the 4,000-student David Lam Campus of Douglas College, which offers university transfer, career-training, and academic-upgrading programs. Therapeutic Recreation, Hotel and Restaurant Management, and Animal Health Technology programs are housed in the original main campus building. The $39 million Health Sciences Centre opened in 2008, with state-of-the-art facilities for Nursing, Psychiatric Nursing, and other health-career programs.

There are two major universities, University of British Columbia and Simon Fraser University, located in nearby municipalities. The British Columbia Institute of Technology (BCIT) in neighbouring Burnaby provides polytechnic education and grants degrees in several fields. Nearby, Vancouver is also home to the Emily Carr University of Art and Design and the Vancouver Film School.

The Coquitlam Public Library has two branches: City Centre and Poirier, with a third branch planned for the Burke Mountain Community Centre (opening 2029). The library has a circulation of over 1.1 million items, and an annual budget of over $5 million.

== Media ==
In addition to the other Metro Vancouver media outlets, CKPM-FM was the first radio station dedicated to the Tri-Cities area when it took to the air in 2009, before being taken off air in 2019.

Beginning in 1985, Coquitlam was served by the bi-weekly Tri-City News newspaper, which ceased to exist in May of 2025.

A significant number of movie and television productions have been partly or completely filmed in Coquitlam in recent years, including a significant portion of 2018's Deadpool 2, 2014's Godzilla, both New Moon and Eclipse from the Twilight series, The X-Files, Juno, Smallville, Psych, The Sisterhood of the Traveling Pants, Dark Angel, The Day the Earth Stood Still, Romeo Must Die, Stargate SG1, Riverdale, and Watchmen. The city maintains the Coquitlam Film Office to coordinate permits, traffic and crowd control, and insurance for film and television productions.

== Sister cities ==
Coquitlam currently has sister city relationships with the following:

- Foshan, People's Republic of China
- Paju, South Korea

In November 2017, the city stated that they had ended sister city relationships with Laizhou, Tochigi, Ormoc and San Juan.

== Notable people ==
Juno Award-winning rock musician Matthew Good is from Coquitlam. He graduated from Centennial Secondary in 1989, and became lead singer for the Matthew Good Band, one of Canada's most successful alternative rock bands in the 1990s. Centennial Secondary was featured in the "Alert Status Red" video, and its cheerleading squad recorded for "Giant". The Matthew Good Band was dissolved in 2002, and Good has since pursued a solo career and established himself as a political activist, blogger, and author.

Actor Taylor Kitsch graduated from Gleneagle Secondary in 1999, and went on to star in movies such as John Carter and Battleship and Lone Survivor as well as the television series Friday Night Lights.

Former FA Premier League goalkeeper Craig Forrest is from Coquitlam and attended Centennial Secondary. Forrest appeared in 263 games for Ipswich Town, 30 games for West Ham United, and three games for Chelsea. Forrest also earned 56 caps for the Canadian national soccer team, the most of any goalkeeper in team history, and earned the most clean sheets in the country's history. Forrest was elected to Canada's Soccer Hall of Fame in 2007. Former Canadian national soccer team midfielder Jeff Clarke and Canadian women's national soccer player Brittany Timko also both attended Centennial Secondary.

Former National Basketball Association player Lars Hansen was raised in Coquitlam and played his high school basketball at Centennial Secondary. He was a member of the Seattle SuperSonics 1979 NBA Championship team, and was elected to the Canadian Basketball Hall of Fame in 2008.

American political analyst and former Fox News co-host Rachel Marsden was raised in Northeast Coquitlam's Burke Mountain area.

Former BC Lions placekicker Lui Passaglia has resided in Coquitlam for over 20 years. Passaglia is a member of the Canadian Football Hall of Fame, and his #5 jersey is one of eight numbers retired by the Lions. Passaglia was voted #30 of the CFL's Top 50 players of the modern era by Canadian sports network TSN.

Playboy Playmate and actress Dorothy Stratten was raised in Coquitlam and attended Centennial Secondary School. Stratten was Playmate of the Year for 1980. She appeared in several movies, including Peter Bogdanovich's They All Laughed, and was shortly thereafter murdered by her estranged husband. Stratten has been portrayed twice in biographies of her life: by Jamie Lee Curtis in Death of a Centerfold: The Dorothy Stratten Story, and by Mariel Hemingway in Star 80.

Spoken word poet Chris Tse was raised in Coquitlam, though he is based in Ottawa. He was captain of the Ottawa spoken word team which won the Canadian Festival of Spoken Word championships and placed second overall in the Poetry Slam World Cup in Paris, France.

Filipino pop and jazz singer, musician, lyricist, and songwriter Joey Albert is a Coquitlam resident.

National Hockey League players Mathew Barzal of the New York Islanders, Dante Fabbro of the Columbus Blue Jackets, and Vincent Iorio of the San Jose Sharks were all born and raised in Coquitlam.

Science fiction novelist Dennis E. Taylor is a Coquitlam resident.

== See also ==
- Coat of arms of Coquitlam
- Tri-Cities
- Metro Vancouver
- Lower Mainland
