= Como Lake (British Columbia) =

Lake in British Columbia, Canada

- Location within British Columbia
- Location: Coquitlam, British Columbia
- Coordinates: 49.2604°N 122.8583°W
- Basin countries: Canada
- Average depth: 2 m (6.5 ft)
- Max. depth: 4 m (13 ft)
- Surface elevation: 122 m (400 ft)
- Settlements: Coquitlam, BC

Como Lake is a small lake in Como Lake Park in the city of Coquitlam, British Columbia.

It forms the headwaters of the Como watershed and is an urban fishing and recreation area in the city of Coquitlam as well as the Lower Mainland.

The lake is very popular with joggers and walkers, the trail around the lake being 1 km in length. There are small stocked rainbow trout, carp, and catfish living in the lake.

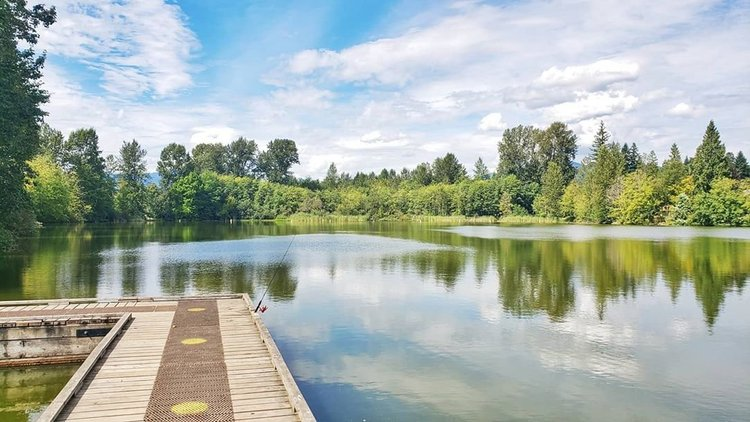
Como Lake, Coquitlam

== See also ==
- List of lakes of British Columbia
