= Colony Farm Regional Park =

Park in Coquitlam, British Columbia, Canada

- ƛ̓éxətəm Regional Park
- Interactive map of Colony Farm Regional Park
- Type: Regional Park
- Location: Coquitlam and Port Coquitlam
- Nearest city: Coquitlam and Port Coquitlam, British Columbia, Canada
- Coordinates: 49.240°N 122.803°W
- Operator: Metro Vancouver Regional District
- Website: metrovancouver.org/services/regional-parks/park/%C6%9B%CC%93%C3%A9x%C9%99t%C9%99m-regional-park

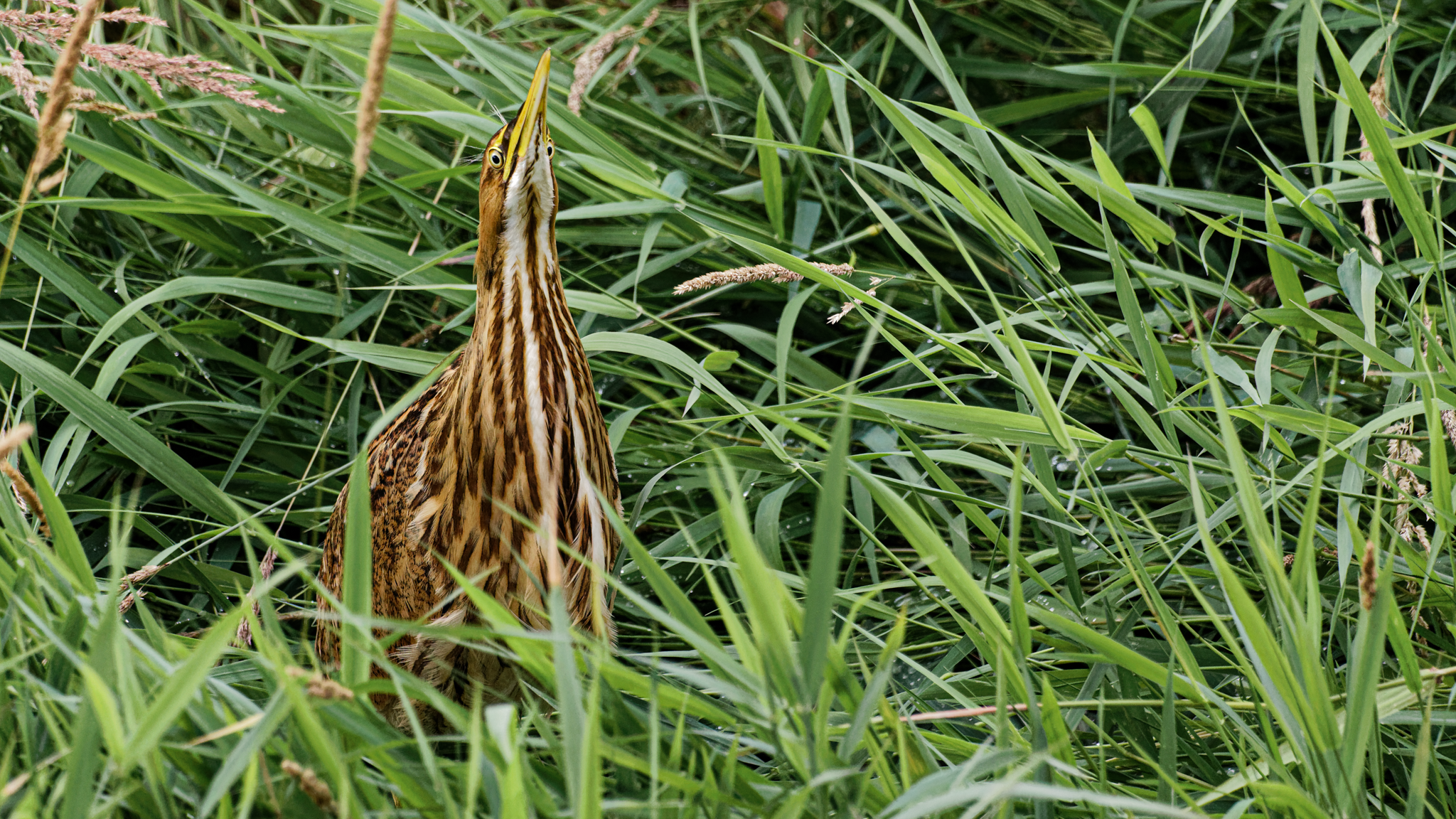
An elusive American Bittern photographed at Colony Farm in Port Coquitlam by Kyle Bailey.

Colony Farm Regional Park, officially known as ƛ̓éxətəm Regional Park (Halkomelem pronunciation: ['tɬʼaxətəm] TLA-hut-um), is a park along the Coquitlam River in the Tri-Cities area of Metro Vancouver. It is 260 hectares in size. Colony Farm was once one of the most modern and productive working farms in Canada. Today, Colony Farm provides important habitat for many animal species and over 200 bird species. On July 1, 2023, the Kwikwetlem First Nation and Metro Vancouver Regional District announced that the park would be officially renamed to ƛ̓éxətəm, which translates into "be invited".
