= Mundy Park =

Park in Coquitlam, British Columbia

- Interactive map of Mundy Park
- Type: Municipal
- Location: 641 Hillcrest Street; Coquitlam, British Columbia; Canada
- Coordinates: 49.2561°N 122.826°W
- Area: 176 hectares (435 acres)
- Operator: City of Coquitlam
- Status: Open all year
- Website: www.coquitlam.ca/Facilities/Facility/Details/Mundy-Park-59

Mundy Park is a park located in Coquitlam, British Columbia, Canada. At 176 hectares (435 acres), it is the largest park in Coquitlam. The park has many walking trails that pass the park's two lakes: Mundy Lake and Lost Lake. There are also sports fields, a lacrosse box, a recently added outdoor swimming pool, disc golf area, picnic area, and playground.

The Coquitlam Reds of the B.C. Premier Baseball League play their home games at Mundy Park.

Some scenes from the 2006 film Deck the Halls were shot at Mundy Park.

There is a wide variety of wildlife in Mundy Park, including black bears, deer, raccoons, ducks, geese, swans, and other birds. Some endangered plants are also to be found at Mundy Park.

Mundy Park was originally named "Munday Park" after George Munday, who originally bought the land. The reason for the name change is unknown.
