= Coquitlam Search and Rescue =

Coquitlam Search and Rescue

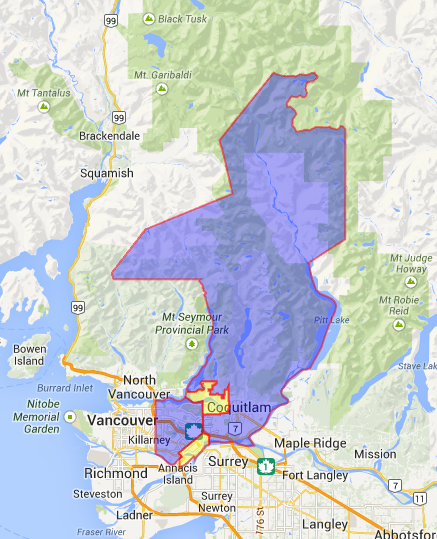
Coquitlam SAR Search Area

Coquitlam Search and Rescue (SAR) is a volunteer, non-profit organization dedicated to wilderness search and rescue in the Coquitlam area of British Columbia, Canada. First formed in 1972, the organization's service area today covers the communities of Anmore, Belcarra, Burnaby, Coquitlam, New Westminster, Port Coquitlam and Port Moody.

== Operations ==
Coquitlam Search and Rescue responds to an average of 35 tasks per year. In 2017, the organization received 54 calls for help, which was more than any previous year in its history. This was then surpassed in 2021, with 76 calls across its search area.

== Volunteers ==
The all-volunteer team is made up of highly skilled hikers, mountaineers and back country skiers, some of whom dedicate more than 500 hours per year and often conduct rescues at night, in bad weather, and on short notice. The team trains together every Tuesday night. Volunteers also attend special courses, devote time to education and fundraising, and pay for their own personal equipment and clothing.
