= Coquitlam City Hall =

Municipal building in British Columbia, Canada

Coordinates: 49.28453°N 122.79331°W

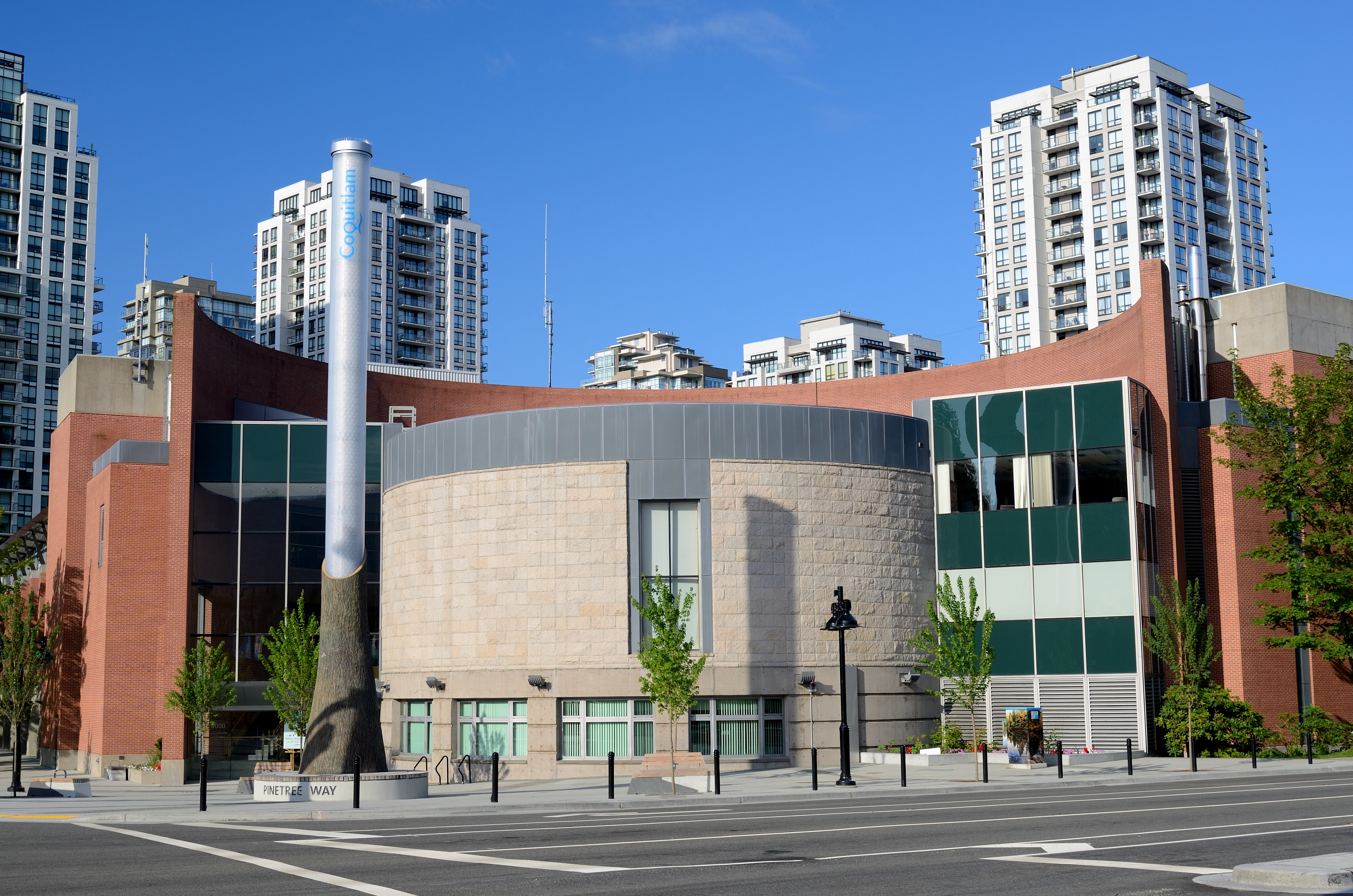
Coquitlam City Hall

Coquitlam City Hall is the home of Coquitlam City Council in Coquitlam, British Columbia, Canada. It is located at the intersection of Pinetree Way and Guildford Way in the Town Centre neighbourhood.

City Hall is part of a two-building complex built in the campus, the other being Public Safety Building which houses the Royal Canadian Mounted Police (RCMP) detachment.

Both buildings were designed by Grant & Sinclair Architects Limited and completed in 2001.

== City Hall ==
Home to Coquitlam City Council in a three-storey 80,700 square feet (7,500 m^{2}) complex housing council chambers, city office space and public library. The Coquitlam Public Library’s City Centre branch moved in 2013 to 1169 Pinetree Way to significantly increase space, nearly tripling to 31,000 square feet.

== Public Safety Building ==
The 67,800 square feet (6,300 m^{2}) complex is home to the city's other department and an RCMP detachment.
