= Poirier Sport & Leisure Complex =

Recreation complex in Coquitlam, British Columbia

Coordinates: 49.255011°N 122.844958°W

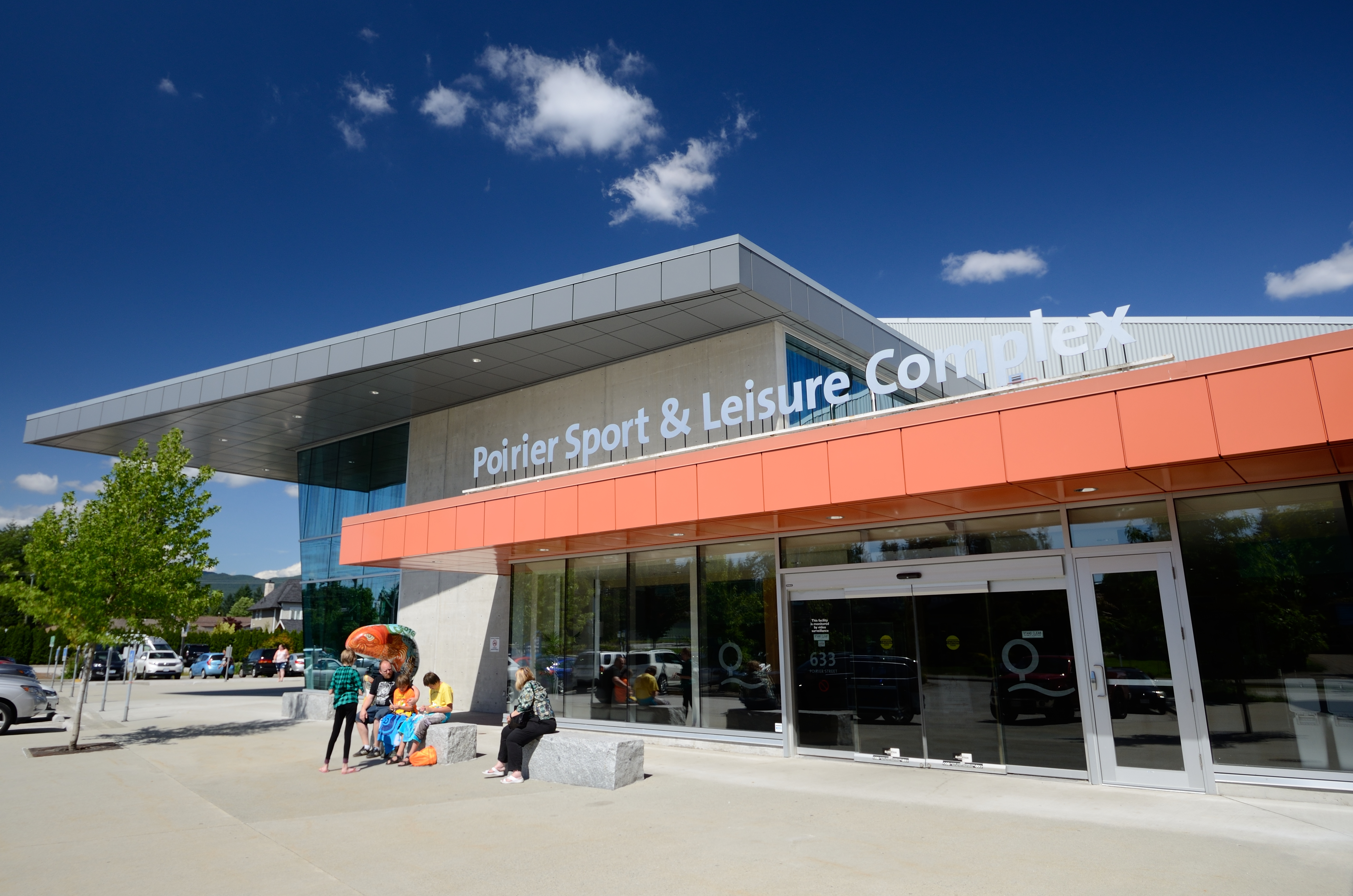
- Interactive map of Poirier Sport & Leisure Complex
- Location: Coquitlam, British Columbia
- Owner: City of Coquitlam
- Capacity: 2200
- Surface: Artificial ice

Tenants
- Coquitlam Express (BCHL) (2001–2005, 2010–); Coquitlam Adanacs (WLA); Vancouver NE Chiefs (BCMML) (2015–2017)

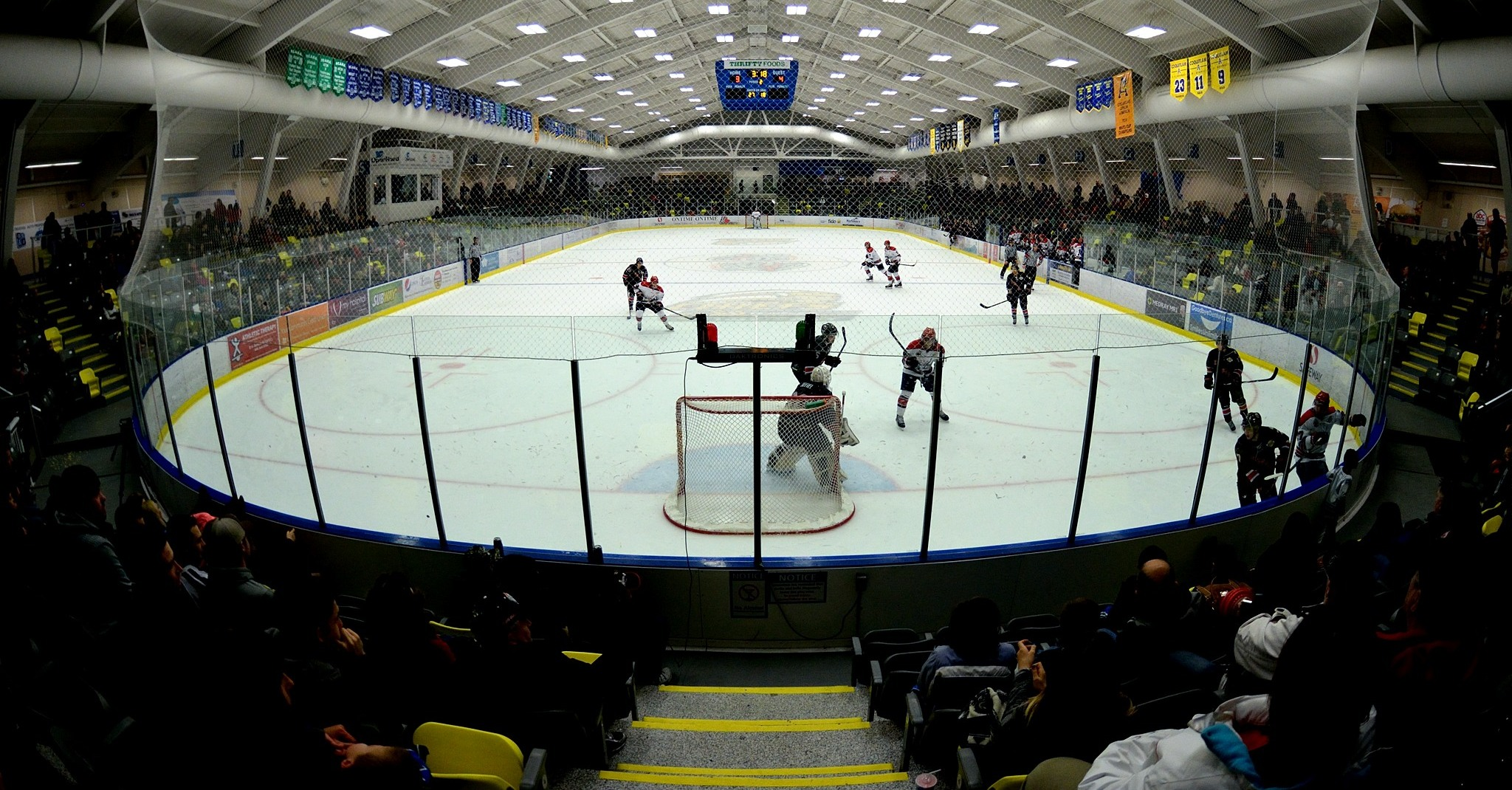
Main arena during a Coquitlam Express B.C. Hockey League game.

Poirier Sport & Leisure Complex is a 190,000-square-foot multi-purpose all-season recreation complex in Coquitlam, British Columbia.

== Arena ==
The arena-side of the facility is used by a wide variety of groups, including hockey, lacrosse and ringette teams and figure skaters for hosting national tournaments.

The facility has three playing surfaces. Arena 1 features a 200' x 80' playing surface with seating for 2,200 spectators. Arena 2 and 3 feature a 200' x 85' NHL standard playing surface. All three Arenas can be converted for both ice and dry floor use.

The facility is home to the Coquitlam Sports Hall of Fame, as well as the Coquitlam Express of the British Columbia Hockey League, the Coquitlam Adanacs of the Western Lacrosse Association and the Coquitlam Adanacs of the BC Junior A Lacrosse League.

== Pool ==
The pool-side of the facility includes:

- 25 metre main swimming pool
- 20 metre warm lap pool
- Leisure pool, including:
  - Wheelchair ramp entry
  - Lazy river
  - Therapy spray
  - Tot bubblers, spray arches, belle sprays, and geysers
- 1 metre and 3 metre competition diving boards
- Hot tub
- Dry sauna
- Steam room
- Weight/fitness room

== Expansion and renovation ==
In 2010, the old Coquitlam Sports Centre underwent a $62 million expansion and renovation:

- Expansion of main arena, with the ice surface extended to the NHL standard length of 200 feet
- Replacement of the recreational arena
- Replacement of the curling rink
- Lobby improvements to integrate the facility with the aquatic and fitness centre
- New restrooms, concession areas, dressing rooms, and administration areas

== Energy efficiency ==
The facility has been built according to the Leadership in Energy and Environmental Design Silver Standard, including:

- Solar water heating
- Rainwater retention and reuse for landscaping
- Landscaping with native species
- Use of recycled content and non-toxic building products
