= Coquitlam Adanacs =

Box lacrosse team in British Columbia

- Founded: 1965
- League: Western Lacrosse Association
- Team history: Coquitlam Adanacs (1965-1967); Portland Adanacs (1968); Coquitlam Adanacs (1969-present)
- Based in: Coquitlam, British Columbia
- Arena: Poirier Sport & Leisure Complex
- Colours: Purple, gold, and white
- Head coach: Steve McKinlay
- National championships: (1) 2001 Mann Cup
- League titles: (6) (1988, 1993, 1998, 2001, 2007, 2026)
- Website: AdanacLacrosse.com

The Coquitlam Adanacs are a Canadian box lacrosse team based in Coquitlam, British Columbia. The Adanacs play in B.C.'s seven team Western Lacrosse Association (WLA), whose champion competes against Ontario's Major Series Lacrosse champion for the Mann Cup every September.

The Adanacs originally started as a basketball team during the 1920s in New Westminster. The team expanded to lacrosse and played as the Adanacs until 1951. In 1965, a new Coquitlam Adanacs lacrosse team was formed by old Adanac players, and won the Mann Cup in 2001. Between 1998 and 2003, Coquitlam and Victoria played against each other in six straight WLA championships. The Shamrocks would come out on top of that rivalry, winning four titles to the Adanacs two, and both teams would win national championships in that era, Victoria's in 1999 and 2003.

For a single season in 1968, the Adanacs moved to Portland, Oregon as an experiment to try to stoke interest in box lacrosse in the American Pacific Northwest. When the National Lacrosse Association collapsed prior to the 1969 season, and efforts to relocate the Adanacs to Seattle failed, they returned to their traditional home in Coquitlam.

The Adanacs play their home games at the Poirier Sport & Leisure Complex.

The Adanacs hold the unique distinction of winning the "Nations in 1980" the first world championship of indoor (box in Canada) lacrosse by defeating the North American Natives, composed of First Nations players, in a nationally televised game from Vancouver's Pacific Coliseum on July 17, 1980. This event was also unique in that the North American Natives were the first to team to ever represent First Nations people in a world championship in any sport.

The Adanacs Junior 'a' team has won the Minto Cup, the national junior 'a' championship, 5 times, including the two most recent titles, in 2024 and 2025.

== Trivia ==
- The name "ADANAC" is simply "CANADA" spelled backwards.
- The team played the 1968 season in Portland, Oregon, but returned the following season.

== All-time record ==
Season	Team name	Games	Win	Losses	Tie	GF	GA	Points	Playoffs
1965	Coquitlam Adanacs	30	12	18	0	272	339	24	Defeated in Finals
1966	Coquitlam Adanacs	30	19	11	0	314	241	38	Defeated in Finals
1967	Coquitlam Adanacs	30	14	15	1	274	254	29	Defeated in Semi-Finals
1968	Portland Adanacs	38	24	14	0	413	365	48	Defeated in Semi-Finals
1969	Coquitlam Adanacs	29	26	3	0	382	242	52	Defeated in Finals
1970	Coquitlam Adanacs	30	14	16	0	350	364	28	Defeated in Finals
1971	Coquitlam Adanacs	31	18	12	1	429	390	37	Defeated in Finals
1972	Coquitlam Adanacs	31	9	22	0	383	566	18	Defeated in Semi-Finals
1973	Coquitlam Adanacs	25	16	9	0	396	350	32	Defeated in Semi-Finals
1974	Coquitlam Adanacs	24	8	15	1	298	358	17	Defeated in Semi-Finals
1975	Coquitlam Adanacs	24	8	16	0	286	383	16	Defeated in Semi-Finals
1976	Coquitlam Adanacs	24	9	15	0	316	356	18	Defeated in Semi-Finals
1977	Coquitlam Adanacs	24	11	13	0	297	288	22	Defeated in Semi-Finals
1978	Coquitlam Adanacs	24	10	13	1	310	332	21	Defeated in Finals
1979	Coquitlam Adanacs	30	17	12	1	427	382	35	Defeated in Finals
1980	Coquitlam Adanacs	24	15	9	0	287	268	30	Defeated in Semi-Finals
1981	Coquitlam Adanacs	24	17	7	0	333	262	34	Defeated in Finals
1982	Coquitlam Adanacs	24	8	16	0	280	308	16	Defeated in Finals
1983	Coquitlam Adanacs	24	10	14	0	256	263	20	Did Not Qualify
1984	Coquitlam Adanacs	24	10	14	0	265	275	20	Defeated in playoff round robin
1985	Coquitlam Adanacs	24	14	10	0	227	200	28	Defeated in playoff round robin
1986	Coquitlam Adanacs	24	10	14	0	204	245	20	Defeated in Semi-Finals
1987	Coquitlam Adanacs	24	13	11	0	226	226	26	Defeated in Finals
1988	Coquitlam Adanacs	24	13	11	0	226	195	26	Defeated in Mann Cup
1989	Coquitlam Adanacs	24	11	13	0	242	249	22	Defeated in Finals
1990	Coquitlam Adanacs	24	6	18	0	203	242	12	Did Not Qualify
1991	Coquitlam Adanacs	24	18	6	0	268	198	36	Defeated in Finals
1992	Coquitlam Adanacs	24	10	14	0	191	228	20	Defeated in Semi-Finals
1993	Coquitlam Adanacs	23	17	6	0	251	212	34	Defeated in Mann Cup
1994	Coquitlam Adanacs	20	13	7	0	215	199	26	Defeated in Finals
1995	Coquitlam Adanacs	25	11	11	3	236	226	25	Defeated in Semi-Finals
1996	Coquitlam Adanacs	20	5	15	0	158	190	10	Did Not Qualify
1997	Coquitlam Adanacs	20	9	10	1	169	171	19	Defeated in Semi-Finals
1998	Coquitlam Adanacs	25	15	9	1	255	216	31	Defeated in Mann Cup
1999	Coquitlam Adanacs	25	18	7	0	248	201	36	Defeated in Finals
2000	Coquitlam Adanacs	25	14	11	0	278	276	28	Defeated in Finals
2001	Coquitlam Adanacs	20	12	8	0	225	224	24	Won Mann Cup
2002	Coquitlam Adanacs	20	13	6	1	264	205	27	Defeated in Finals
2003	Coquitlam Adanacs	20	17	3	0	266	195	34	Defeated in Finals
2004	Coquitlam Adanacs	20	11	9	0	223	200	22	Defeated in Semi-Finals
2005	Coquitlam Adanacs	18	13	4	1	267	198	27	Defeated in Finals
2006	Coquitlam Adanacs	18	11	6	1	192	187	23	Defeated in Semi-Finals
2007	Coquitlam Adanacs	18	9	7	2	178	188	20	Defeated in Mann Cup
2008	Coquitlam Adanacs	18	13	3	2	180	135	28	Defeated in Finals
2009	Coquitlam Adanacs	18	9	9	0	171	186	18	Defeated in Finals
2010	Coquitlam Adanacs	18	9	9	0	204	197	18	Defeated in Semi-Finals
2011	Coquitlam Adanacs	18	7	11	0	160	164	14	Did Not Qualify
2012	Coquitlam Adanacs	18	10	8	0	147	137	20	Defeated in Finals
2013	Coquitlam Adanacs	18	9	8	1	164	171	19	Defeated in Semi-Finals
2014	Coquitlam Adanacs	18	7	11	0	135	144	14	Defeated in Semi-Finals
2015	Coquitlam Adanacs	18	7	11	0	141	168	14	Did Not Qualify
2016	Coquitlam Adanacs	18	7	11	0	140	162	14	Did Not Qualify
2017	Coquitlam Adanacs	18	5	13	0	133	183	10	Did Not Qualify
2018	Coquitlam Adanacs	18	2	16	0	131	194	4	Did Not Qualify
2019	Coquitlam Adanacs	18	3	15	0	122	201	6	Did Not Qualify
2020	season cancelled								
2021	season cancelled								
2022	Coquitlam Adanacs	18	12	6	0	186	152	24	Defeated in Semi-Finals
2023	Coquitlam Adanacs	18	2	16	0	137	196	4	Did Not Qualify
2024	Coquitlam Adanacs	18	7	10	1	151	177	15	Did Not Qualify
2025	Coquitlam Adanacs	18	15	2	1	174	129	31	Defeated in Finals
2026	Coquitlam Adanacs	18	12	6	0	171	115	24	Defeated in Mann Cup
Total	60 Season	1,359	694	645	20	14,427	14,268	1,408	1 Mann Cup
