= Como Lake Park (British Columbia) =

Park in British Columbia, Canada

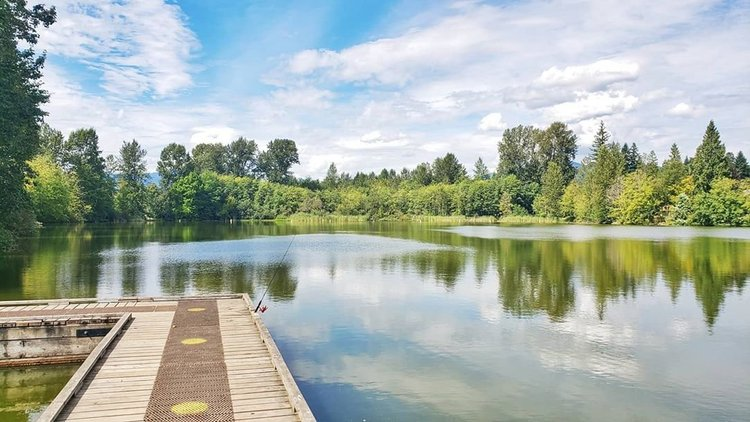
- Interactive map of Como Lake Park
- Type: Urban park
- Location: 700 Gatensbury Street; Coquitlam, British Columbia; Canada
- Coordinates: 49.261°N 122.859°W
- Website: www.coquitlam.ca/Facilities/Facility/Details/Como-Lake-Park-26

Como Lake Park is a small park in Coquitlam, British Columbia, Canada. Como Lake is located in the centre of the park and is surrounded by a one-kilometre-long trail.
