= Coat of arms of Coquitlam =

Heraldic emblem of the city

The coat of arms of Coquitlam is the emblem of the city of Coquitlam in British Columbia.

== Blazon ==
Coat of Arms of Coquitlam

Arms

Argent, a fess wavy Azure thereon another wavy Or in base a fleur-de-lys Azure on a chief embattled Azure a fraise Argent between two dogwood flowers Argent seeded Or

Crest

A coronet Or the rim set with fraises Azure alternating with dogwood flowers Argent seeded Or

Supporters

On a grassy mound Vert two Clydesdale stallions Or charged on each shoulder with a fraise Azure

Motto

ANIMUS FLUMINUM VIRES POPULI ("The spirit of the rivers is the strength of the people")
