= Coquitlam Public Library =

Public library system in British Columbia

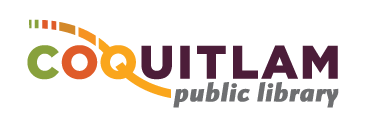
- Established: in 1969 as part of the "Centennial Community Library" and as a separate entity in 1976 with the first branches opening in 1978
- Branches: 2 full service branches + Library Link mobile service

Collection
- Items collected: Includes books, ebooks and eaudiobooks, music, movies, video games, online newspapers and magazines, digital resources
- Size: 176,373 items

Access and use
- Circulation: 1,354,427
- Population served: 139,284 population

Other information
- Budget: CA $5,931,150
- Director: Anthea Goffe, Interim Executive Director
- Employees: 85
- Website: coqlibrary.ca

Coquitlam Public Library is a public library that serves Coquitlam, British Columbia.

== Overview ==
In 2019, Coquitlam Public Library had:

- 935,238 visits to the Library
- 60,670 active customers
- 1.35 millions items borrowed.

== History ==
The library was first established in Centennial Secondary School in 1967. By the early 1970s, it was clear that the school library was not meeting the demands of the growing community. In 1972, led by the Coquitlam Chapter of the Canadian Federation of University Women, a town meeting was called to discuss the need for an official public library.

It was not until June 14, 1976, that the municipality passed a by-law to officially create the Coquitlam Public Library under the Provincial Library Act. A public Library Board was established in 1977. By 1981, the Library had developed into three different branches throughout Coquitlam. Two of the branches, Ridgeway and Cottonwood, were amalgamated into one when the City of Coquitlam built the Poirier branch in 1989, and the remaining branch, Lincoln, was moved to the City Hall building in 1998 and renamed the City Centre branch.

The Poirier branch was extensively renovated and expanded in 2008–2009.

In 2011 the City of Coquitlam announced that it had purchased the ground floor portion of a building across from the City Centre Mall to serve as the new City Centre branch. The new location nearly tripled the library's space to 31,000 square feet, and the $15 million cost for the facility and expansion came primarily from revenues collected from the Hard Rock Casino. The City Centre Branch opened in 2013.

Coquitlam Public Library's mobile library service, the Library Link, was started in 2009 to bring Library service to outlying geographical areas in Coquitlam.

== Branches ==
The library has two branches as well as a mobile library service called the Library Link.

- The City Centre branch (1169 Pinetree Way) houses an Innovation Hub that provides community access to new and emerging technologies such as 3D printing and virtual reality experiences.
- The Poirier branch (575 Poirier Street) includes a Digitization Station in the Local History Room, which the public can use for free to convert photographs, slides, audio cassette tapes, VHS tapes and more to digital file formats.
- The Library Link provides library service to multiple locations throughout the city along with attending various special events throughout the community.
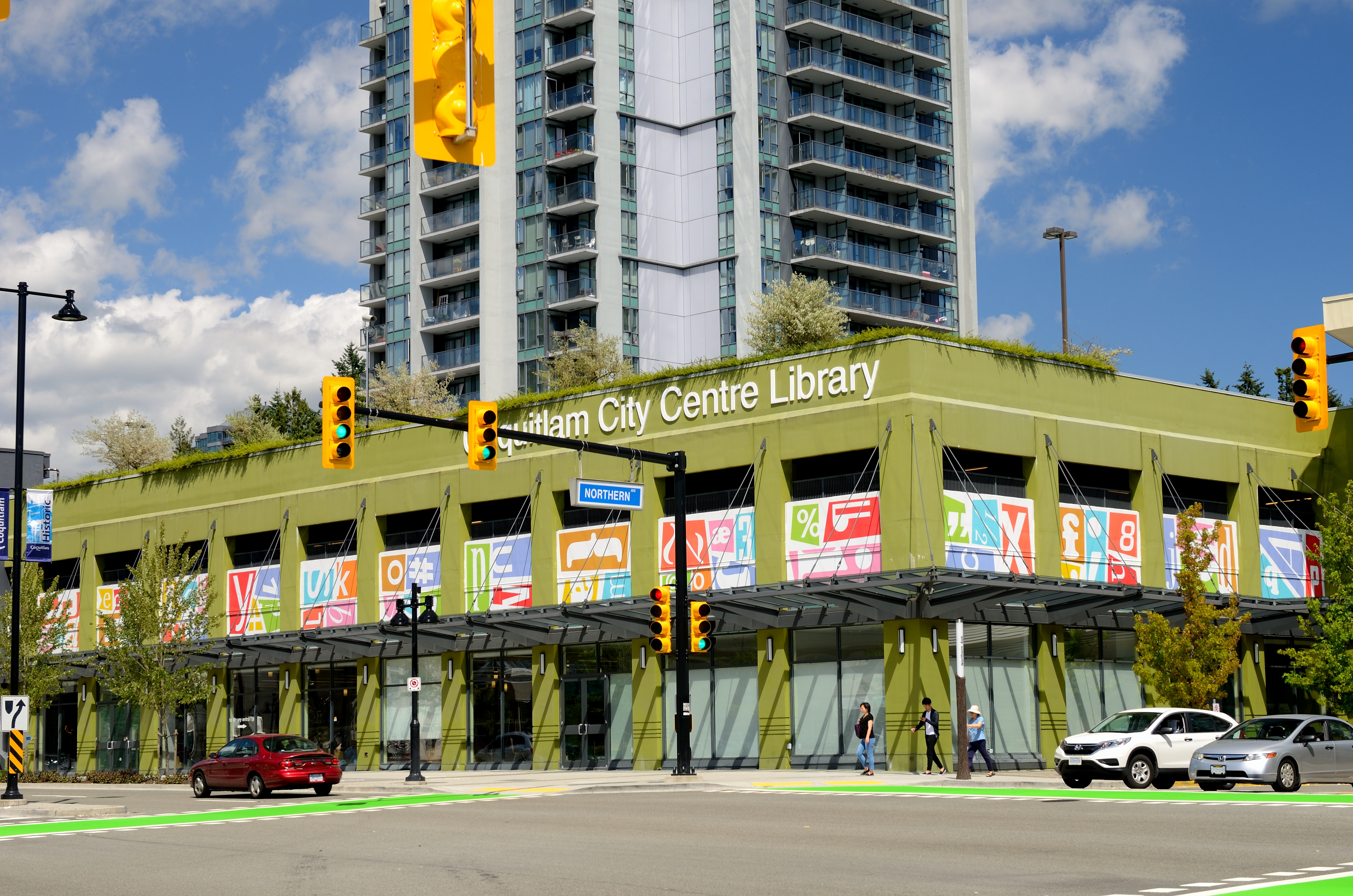
City Centre
49°16′53.2″N 122°47′34.8″W

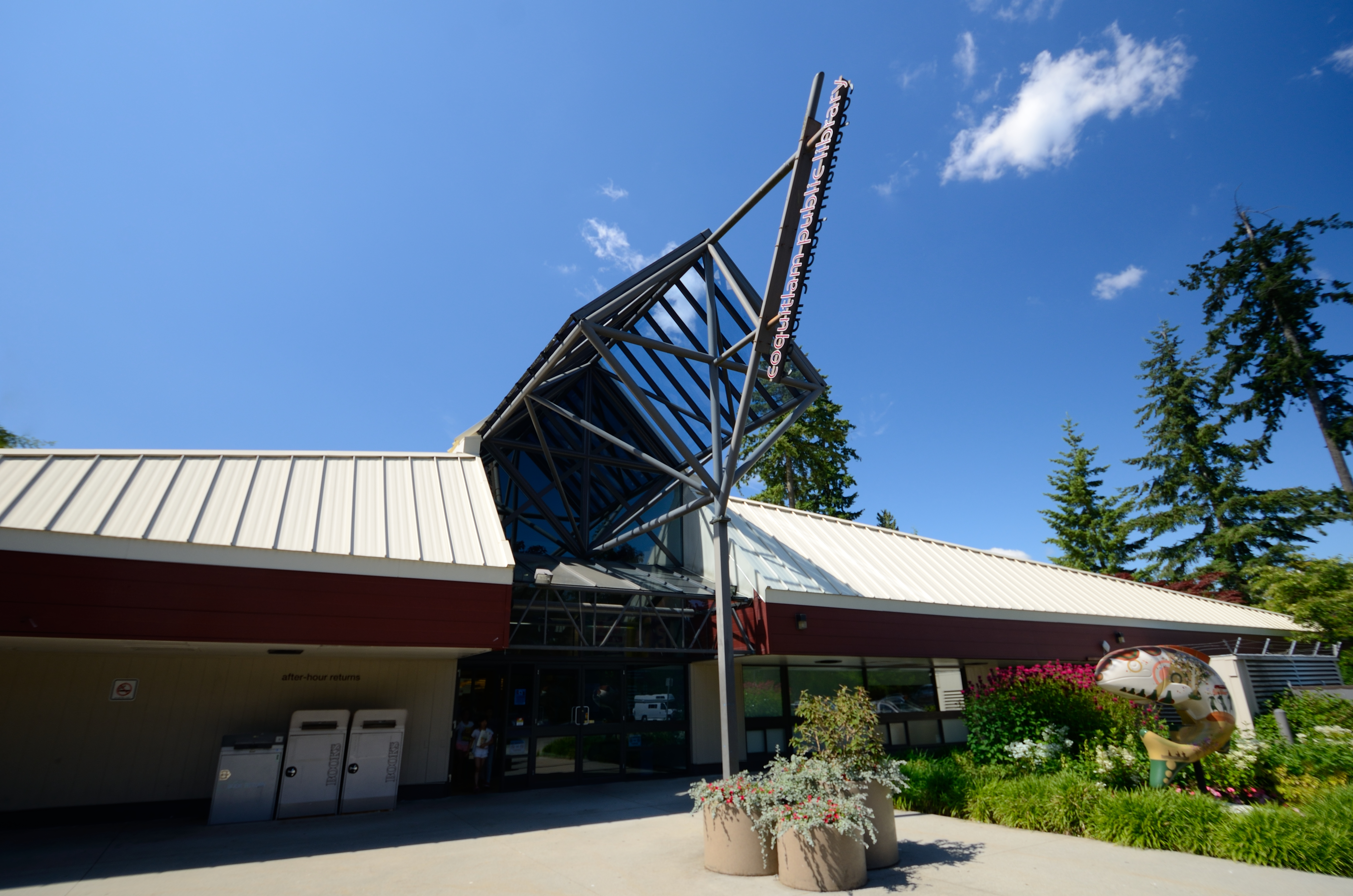
Poirier
49°15′12.4″N 122°50′44.6″W

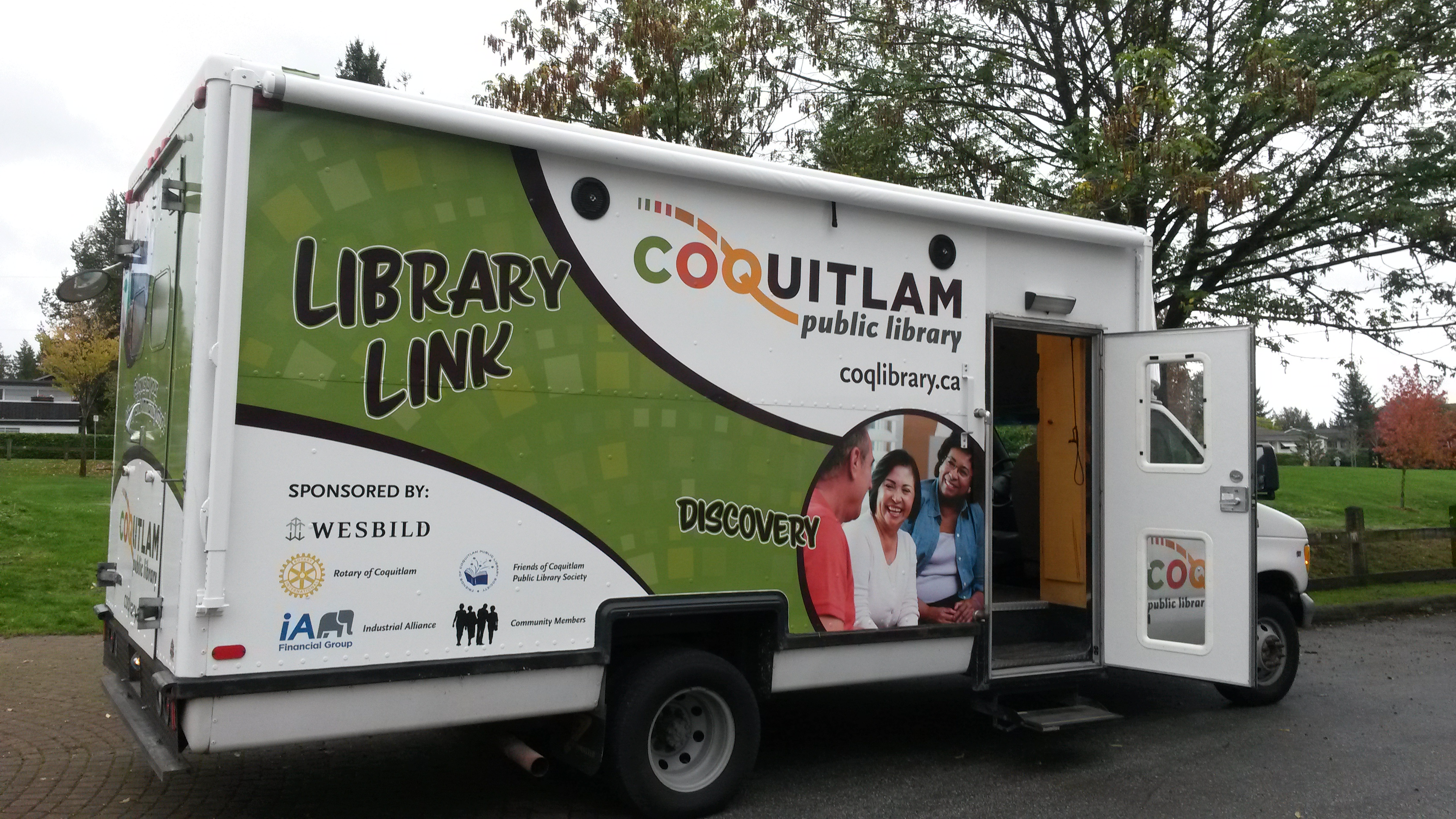
Library Link
