= British Columbia Summer Swimming Association =

The British Columbia Summer Swimming Association (BCSSA) is a competitive aquatics program in British Columbia, Canada. The organization offers competition in four disciplines: Speed Swimming, Water polo, Diving, and Synchronized Swimming. BCSSA celebrated its 50th anniversary in 2008.

== Competitive Season ==
The summer season officially runs from May 1 to August 31 of each year; however, the competitive season is completed during the 3rd week in August with no competitions occurring following this date. During the off-season from September 1 to April 30, participation in each of the disciplines is limited on a weekly basis.

== Regions and Clubs ==
The organization is composed of 58 teams from around the province of British Columbia, with one exception, as one team is located in Colville, Washington state.

For early season competitions and organizational administration, the province is divided into eight regions: Cariboo, Fraser South, Fraser Valley, Kootenay, Okanagan, Simon Fraser, Vancouver & District, and Vancouver Island.

In total, BCSSA offers 59 swim clubs across 8 regions, 10 water polo clubs across 5 regions, 5 artistic clubs across 4 regions, and 2 diving clubs across 2 regions. Of the 61 total clubs only the North Van. Cruisers (Vancouver & District Region) and the Coquitlam Sharks (Simon Fraser Region) offer all 4 of the aquatic disciplines that BCSSA provides.

== Provincial championships ==
The BCSSA holds an annual Provincial Championships during the third week of August every year. During the Provincial Championships athletes compete in all the aquatic disciplines that BCSSA offers. Only athletes that have qualified through their respective regional championship meet are eligible to compete at the Provincial Championship Meet. Locations for provincials are often rotated between three locations every three years. The Lower Mainland, The Interior, and Vancouver Island.

Meet Schedule

- Water Polo: Monday-Wednesday
- Springboard Diving: Tuesday-Thursday
- Artistic Swimming: Wednesday-Thursday
- Speed Swimming: Thursday(regional swim practice), Friday-Sunday(competition)

== Regional Championships ==
Each individual region in BCSSA self hosts their own annual Regional Championships during the first weekend of August for speed swimming. However, for the other three disciplines dates for the Regional Championships usually change annually. Athletes and/or teams must first compete and place within either placing standards or time standards to qualify for the BCSSA Provincial Championship Meet. For many athletes the Regional Championships is the final competition of their summer season.

Qualifying for the BCSSA Provincial Championships

Speed Swimming: Swimmers must place in the top 3 in finals for individual events. For relays, teams in the top 2 during regionals will qualify. The only exception is when a swimmer or a relay team manages to swim a provincial qualifying time (PQT). Any swimmers or relay team that manages to meet or better a PQT in a final event will automatically qualify for Provincials. All of these must happen at ones respective Regional Championship.

Water Polo: Teams must win their regional competition. In the event that a region only has one team, that team will automatically go to provincials. In the event that not enough teams qualify, a team may get a "buy" and be allowed to participate., even if they lost their regional competition.
