= Bonita Zarrillo =

Canadian politician (born c. 1965)

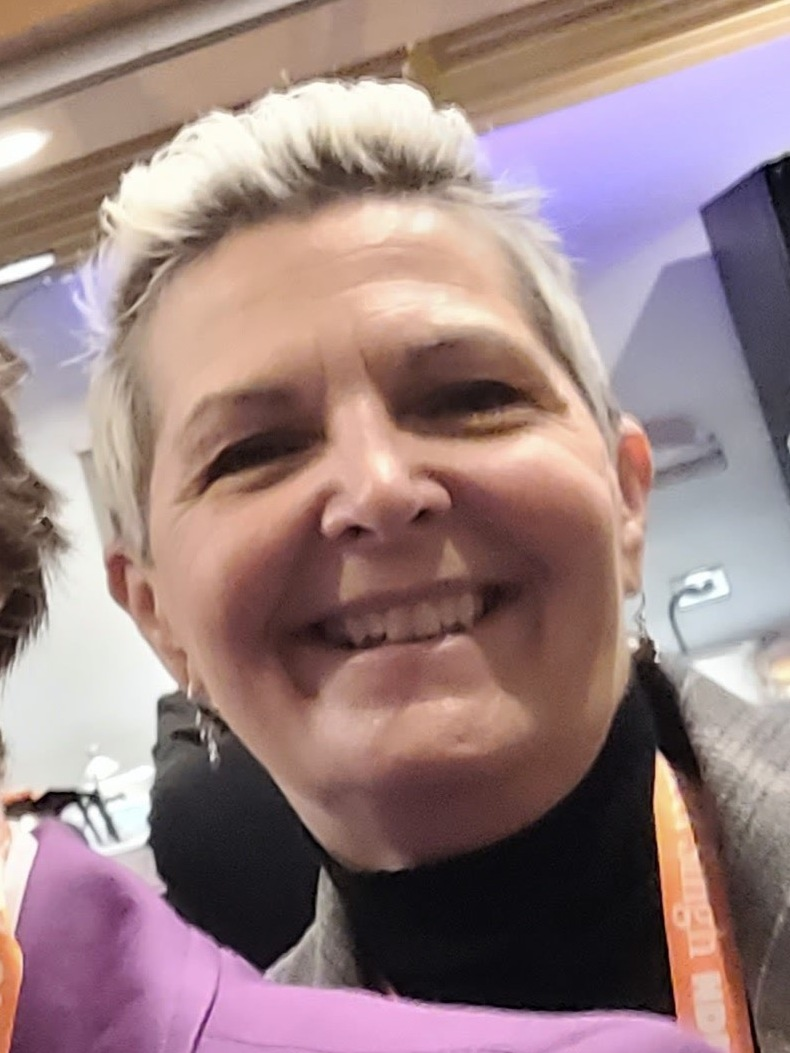

Critic, Disability Inclusion; Infrastructure and Communities
- In office October 29, 2021 – March 23, 2025
- Leader: Jagmeet Singh

Member of Parliament for Port Moody—Coquitlam
- In office September 20, 2021 – March 23, 2025
- Preceded by: Nelly Shin
- Succeeded by: Zoe Royer

Coquitlam City Councillor
- In office 2013 – September 20, 2021

Personal details
- Born: 1965 or 1966 (age 59–60) Saskatoon, Saskatchewan, Canada
- Party: New Democratic
- Occupation: Computer programmer; data analyst

Bonita M. Zarrillo (born 1965 or 1966) is a Canadian politician, the Member of Parliament for Port Moody—Coquitlam from 2021 to 2025. She had previously narrowly lost the riding in 2019 to the Conservative Party's Nelly Shin. Zarrillo is a member of the New Democratic Party. Prior to her election to the House of Commons, she served as a city councillor for Coquitlam City Council.

== Municipal politics ==
Beginning in 2013, Zarrillo served three terms on the Coquitlam City Council. Zarrillo's work as a councillor focused on a diverse set of issues, including campaigns to promote anti-vaping and anti-cigarette butt causes, as well as gender equity.

As a city councillor, Zarrillo worked to bring to light issues of housing affordability and management of public works. She was critical of the proposed developments in Burquitlam, stating that the developments resembled "lifeless" developments in Eastern Canada which caused disconnects between the public and public spaces taken over by entities, highlighting concerns regarding housing affordability. On greenlighting the City Centre Area Plan (CCAP), Zarrillo expressed concerns about the displacement of low-income housing.

Zarrillo was criticized following her decision to leave a city council meeting without prior notice to attend a National Day of Action Against Anti-Asian Racism rally at Lincoln station. She stated she wanted to stand up for Coquitlam's Asian community, following a report describing the city of Vancouver as the “Anti-Asian Hate Crime Capital of North America” and a recent incident regarding the racially motivated harassment of a Chinese-Canadian Coquitlam resident.

During the COVID-19 pandemic, Zarrillo publicly expressed her discomfort with the city council's lack of transparency during city council meetings which were held in a hybrid format. She stated that the format "[changed] the meeting dynamics and doesn't provide for equal access" and that she was "uncomfortable" with several city council members who attended the meeting in-person who were unmasked in their cubicles, raising public health concerns. Coquitlam was one of the few cities within Metro Vancouver to have in-person city council meetings during the pandemic.

Zarrillo gained a reputation as a dissenting voice during her three-term tenure as a councillor. Her work on the Coquitlam City Council resulted in a position on the board of the Federation of Canadian Municipalities.

== Federal politics ==
=== 2019 election ===
Zarrillo was nominated as the New Democratic Party's candidate in Port Moody—Coquitlam to succeed outgoing MP Fin Donnelly, who had held the seat for a decade. Zarrillo announced her campaign for the seat on International Women's Day, and five weeks after winning a third term on the Coquitlam City Council. The final result was a three-way split between the Liberal, Conservative, and New Democratic Party candidates. Zarrillo lost to Shin by 153 votes, falling under the 0.01% needed to trigger a judicial recount. Zarrillo filed for a recount citing concerns of "administrative mistakes", which was later terminated at Zarrillo's request. She stated that she wanted to "give confidence to the community that every vote had been counted." In addition to outgoing MP Fin Donnelly, Coquitlam-Maillardville MLA Selina Robinson, Kwikwetlem First Nation Chief Ed Hall, the New Westminster and District Labour Council, and Unifor Local 2000 endorsed Zarrillo. As she was a sitting city councillor, she returned to her work following her loss.

=== 2021 election ===
Zarrillo ran again in the 2021 election in a rematch against Shin. Due to the close 2019 result in Port Moody—Coquitlam, all three major parties targeted the riding, and New Democratic Party leader Jagmeet Singh visited the riding twice during his national campaign tour. Fin Donnelly, now serving as MLA for Coquitlam-Burke Mountain in the Legislative Assembly of British Columbia, Amy Lubik of Port Moody City Council, Chris Wilson of the Coquitlam City Council, and Chief Ed Hall of the Kwikwetlem First Nation endorsed Zarrillo.

Zarrillo won in her rematch against Shin, with 62.2 percent of voter turnout in the riding, flipping the seat back to the New Democratic Party. Zarrillo was confirmed to have been elected on September 24, 2021, four days following polling day, after mail-in ballots had been counted. She resigned from her city council seat on October 1, 2021. Coquitlam City Council subsequently unanimously voted to file a request to the Minister of Municipal Affairs Josie Osborne not to hold a mandated byelection for her seat, citing concerns as a result of the COVID-19 pandemic, and that the replacement would only serve less than eight months on council.

=== 2025 federal election ===
Zarrillo sought re-election as the New Democratic Party candidate in Port Moody—Coquitlam at the 2025 Canadian federal election, but was defeated by Liberal candidate Zoë Royer.

Her loss formed part of a broader collapse in support for the federal NDP in British Columbia and nationally: the party’s seat count and vote share fell sharply in the 2025 election, costing the NDP many incumbent seats. It was the worst election result in NDP history.

Following the election night loss, she publicly expressed pride in her record, stating “I was just proud to be able to stand up over and over again for people that are struggling with affordability in the Lower Mainland and in the Tri Cities, and to be able to be their voice,” and affirmed her commitment to continue advocating despite losing the seat.

In 2026, Lachance endorsed Rob Ashton in that year's federal NDP leadership race.

== Policy positions ==
During her years of service on Coquitlam City Council, Zarrillo became known as an advocate for green jobs and affordable housing. She also focused on investment in transportation infrastructure. During an election debate, Zarrillo stated that municipalities were "desperate" for stable federal funding in regards to transit infrastructure. She criticized the Coquitlam City Council's lack of action in regards to funding transit. Zarrillo praised outgoing MP Fin Donnelly's work in regards to implementing Canada's ban on shark finning and closed containment aquaculture.

=== Climate ===
Zarrillo opposes the Trans Mountain pipeline expansion project, stating the need for urgent climate action. Zarrillo highlighted the importance of transitioning away from fossil fuels, and her view that the city of Coquitlam did not need a secondary pipeline running through the city to deliver an additional 900,000 barrels of oil. Zarrillo stated the proposed expansion was "unreasonable and unrealistic based on what the future needs to look like.” As a member of Coquitlam's City Council, she put forth a motion for the city of Coquitlam to apply, joining the neighboring city of Port Moody, to be an intervenor during the National Energy Board hearings regarding the issue. Subsequently, the council endorsed the motion unanimously.

=== Housing ===
Zarrillo's work as a councillor focused on the issues of housing affordability. Zarrillo said that of the available housing inventory, too much was going towards luxury homebuyers, highlighting the plan for half a million units of affordable housing offered by the NDP. To alleviate the housing crisis, Zarrillo proposed the construction of purpose-built housing, either through housing cooperatives, or exemptions on the GST to housing developers and potential renovators. She discussed displacement of homeowners as a direct result of a lack of housing affordability and as a visible result of the housing crisis within the local community.

== Personal life ==
Zarrillo was born in Saskatoon and graduated from the University of Manitoba with a degree in sociology. Zarrillo travelled around Canada, living in nearly every province and overseas following her graduation, working as a computer programmer. She later worked as a data analyst to map consumer behaviour for companies such as Walmart. At the age of 48, Zarrillo quit her position as a business analyst after she was diagnosed with breast cancer in order to focus on her treatment and recovery. She moved back to Coquitlam in 2010, and started a business as a jobs recruiter.

Four generations of Zarrillo's family reside within Coquitlam. Zarrillo is a mother of three children.

== Electoral history ==
=== Federal ===
2025 Canadian federal election: Port Moody—Coquitlam
** Preliminary results — Not yet official **
Party	Candidate	Votes	%	±%	Expenditures
Liberal	Zoe Royer	27,123	43.57	+14.09	
Conservative	Paul Lambert	25,127	40.37	+8.41	
New Democratic	Bonita Zarrillo	9,360	15.04	–20.00	
Green	Nash Milani	519	0.83	N/A	
Marxist–Leninist	Roland Verrier	117	0.19	+0.08	
Total valid votes/expense limit					
Total rejected ballots					
Turnout		62,246	70.40		
Eligible voters		88,418			
Liberal notional gain from New Democratic		Swing		+17.05	
Source: Elections Canada

2021 Canadian federal election: Port Moody—Coquitlam
Party	Candidate	Votes	%	±%	Expenditures
New Democratic	Bonita Zarrillo	19,367	37.18	+6.25	$89,534.85
Conservative	Nelly Shin	16,605	31.88	+0.67	$113,068.07
Liberal	Will Davis	14,231	27.32	–1.74	$106,162.59
People's	Desta McPherson	1,766	3.39	+1.87	$1,212.95
Marxist–Leninist	Roland Verrier	122	0.23	+0.12	$0.00
Total valid votes/expense limit		52,091	99.19	–	$113,310.09
Total rejected ballots		428	0.81		
Turnout		52,519	62.74	-3.02	
Eligible voters		83,715			
New Democratic gain from Conservative		Swing		+2.79	
Source: Elections Canada

2019 Canadian federal election: Port Moody—Coquitlam
Party	Candidate	Votes	%	±%	Expenditures
Conservative	Nelly Shin	16,855	31.21	+1.74	$99,557.86
New Democratic	Bonita Zarrillo	16,702	30.93	-5.12	$87,431.13
Liberal	Sara Badiei	15,695	29.06	-1.83	none listed
Green	Bryce Watts	3,873	7.17	+3.74	none listed
People's	Jayson Chabot	821	1.52	–	$1,508.00
Marxist–Leninist	Roland Verrier	57	0.11	-0.05	none listed
Total valid votes/expense limit		54,003	99.34		
Total rejected ballots		361	0.66	+0.35	
Turnout		54,364	65.76	-3.18	
Eligible voters		82,674			
Conservative gain from New Democratic		Swing		+3.43	
Source: Elections Canada

=== Municipal ===
==== 2018 Coquitlam City Council election ====
Top 8 candidates elected

Council candidate	Vote	%
Craig Hodge (X)	14,380	9.55
Chris Wilson (X)	14,315	9.51
Teri Towner (X)	12,427	8.25
Bonita Zarrillo (X)	12,251	8.14
Brent Asmundson (X)	10,652	7.08
Dennis Marsden (X)	10,609	7.05
Trish Mandewo	8,645	5.74
Steve Kim	8,516	5.66
Robert Mazzarolo	8,507	5.65
Ben Craig	8,445	5.61
Darryl J. Stickler	7,454	4.95
Sean Lee	6,793	4.51
Rob Bottos	6,655	4.42
Nicola Spurling	5,777	3.84
Paul Lambert	5,633	3.74
Ian Soutar	2,994	1.99
Massimo Mandarino	2,461	1.63
Geoff W. Hunt	2,158	1.43
Devan Robertson	1,886	1.25

==== 2014 Coquitlam City Council election ====
Top 8 candidates elected

Party	Council candidate	Vote	%
Independent	Craig Hodge (X)	13,495	10.30
Independent	Terry O'Neill (X)	11,712	8.94
Independent	Brent Asmundson (X)	11,036	8.42
Independent	Dennis Marsden	10,372	7.91
Independent	Teri Towner	10,223	7.80
Coquitlam Citizens Association	Chris Wilson (X)	10,134	7.73
Independent	Mae Reid (X)	9,659	7.37
Coquitlam Citizens Association	Bonita Zarrillo (X)	7,960	6.07
Independent	Justin Kim	7,698	5.87
Coquitlam Citizens Association	Neal Nicholson (X)	7,284	5.56
Independent	Ben Craig	6,977	5.32
Independent	Andy Shen	6,066	4.63
Coquitlam Citizens Association	Jack Trumley	5,759	4.39
Independent	Massimo Mandarino	5,342	4.08
Coquitlam Citizens Association	Shobha Nair	5,281	4.03
Independent	Moe Kopahi	2,053	1.57
