= James Moore (Canadian politician) =

Canadian politician (born 1976)

The Honourable James Moore PC
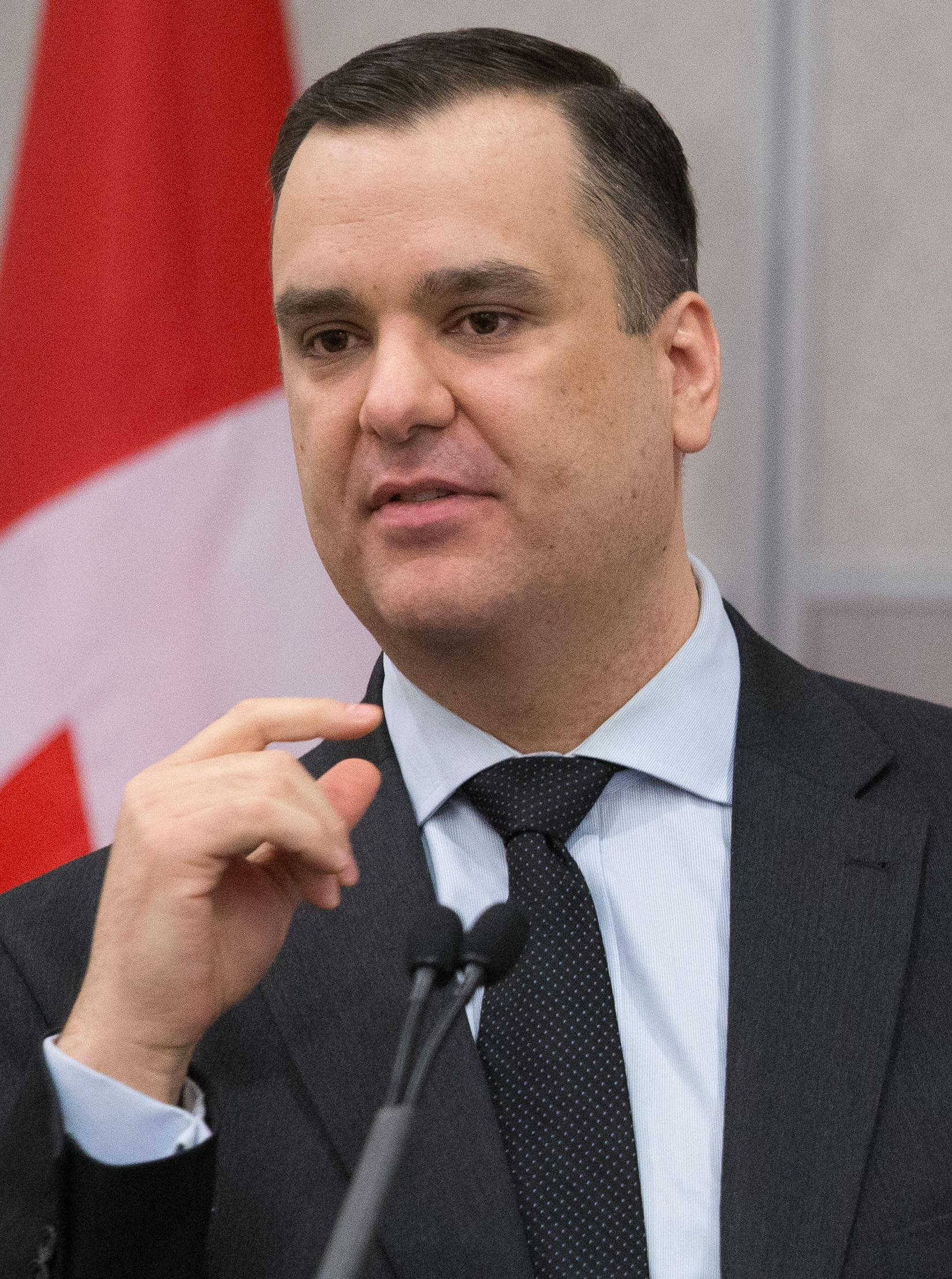

Minister of Industry
- In office July 15, 2013 – November 4, 2015
- Prime Minister: Stephen Harper
- Preceded by: Christian Paradis
- Succeeded by: Navdeep Bains (Innovation, Science and Economic Development)

Minister of Canadian Heritage and Official Languages
- In office October 30, 2008 – July 15, 2013
- Prime Minister: Stephen Harper
- Preceded by: Josée Verner (Canadian Heritage and Status of Women)
- Succeeded by: Shelly Glover

Secretary of State for Foreign Affairs and International Trade
- In office June 25, 2008 – October 29, 2008
- Prime Minister: Stephen Harper
- Preceded by: Position abolished
- Succeeded by: Position established

Member of Parliament for Port Moody—Westwood—Port Coquitlam (Port Moody—Coquitlam—Port Coquitlam; 2000–2004)
- In office November 27, 2000 – October 19, 2015
- Preceded by: Lou Sekora
- Succeeded by: Constituency abolished

Personal details
- Born: June 10, 1976 (age 50) New Westminster, British Columbia, Canada
- Party: Conservative
- Other political affiliations: Canadian Alliance (2000–2003)
- Spouse: Courtney Moore (m. 2011)
- Education: University of Northern British Columbia (B.A.); University of Saskatchewan (M.A.)
- Occupation: Public policy advisor, director, broadcaster

James Moore PC (born June 10, 1976) is a Canadian politician who formerly served as the Minister of Industry in the cabinet of Prime Minister Stephen Harper.

Moore was the Conservative Member of Parliament from 2000 to 2015, representing Port Moody—Coquitlam—Port Coquitlam (2000–2004) and then Port Moody—Westwood—Port Coquitlam (2004–2015). He also served as Minister of Canadian Heritage and Official Languages and as the Secretary of State for Official Languages, Pacific Gateway and the Vancouver-Whistler Olympics before becoming Industry Minister. Prior to entering cabinet, he was the Parliamentary Secretary to the Minister of Public Works and to the Minister for the Pacific Gateway & 2010 Olympics.

Moore did not run in the 2015 federal election. In November 2015, it was announced that he would be the 6th Chancellor of the University of Northern British Columbia, starting May 2016.

== Background ==
Moore was born in New Westminster, British Columbia on June 10, 1976 and was raised in the city of Coquitlam. Following his graduation from Centennial Sr. Secondary, he pursued studies in economics and business administration at Douglas College. In 1996, he started working as a broadcaster at CKST AM1040 in Vancouver. In 1997, he moved to Ottawa to work as the Communications Advisor for the Official Opposition, which at that time was the Reform Party of Canada. In 1998, Moore returned to broadcasting in Vancouver before moving to Prince George to earn a Bachelor of Arts degree in political science at the University of Northern British Columbia. While in Prince George he continued in broadcasting by guest hosting at 550 CKPG and launching his own talk show entitled "’Behind the Headlines’ with James Moore." In 2011, Moore earned his Master of Arts degree in Political Studies from the University of Saskatchewan.

== Political career ==
=== Opposition member ===
In the 2000 federal election Moore was the Canadian Alliance candidate in the federal riding of Port Moody—Coquitlam—Port Coquitlam. At the age of 24 Moore defeated Liberal Party incumbent Lou Sekora by a 20 percentage point margin. With his election win Moore became the youngest member of Parliament ever elected in the province of British Columbia. As a member of the Official Opposition Moore served as Deputy Foreign Affairs Critic and Deputy National Revenue Critic, and was later promoted to serve as the Senior Transport Critic and Vice-Chair of the Commons Transport Committee. In 2003, the Canadian Alliance merged with the Progressive Conservative Party of Canada to form the Conservative Party of Canada. In the 2004 federal election Moore was re-elected in the new riding of Port Moody—Westwood—Port Coquitlam, winning 41% of the popular the vote. Following his re-election he served as the Official Opposition Transportation Critic, as well as Amateur Sport Critic.

In 2004, Moore was one of the few members of his caucus to vote in favour of same-sex marriage. After taking a long time to study the issue he stated "In short, I believe in equality under the law for all Canadians for civil marriages, which in a perfect world would be termed civil unions".

=== Government member ===
In the 2006 federal election the Conservative Party won a minority government and Moore was re-elected in his riding over former Coquitlam mayor, Jon Kingsbury. On February 7, 2006, Moore was appointed as the Parliamentary Secretary to the Minister Public Works and Government Services Canada and the Parliamentary Secretary to the Minister for the Pacific Gateway and the Vancouver-Whistler Olympics. Moore was responsible for answering questions regarding Public Works and Government Services during Question Period due to the minister, Michael Fortier, being a senator as opposed to a member of Parliament.

On June 25, 2008, Prime Minister Stephen Harper appointed Moore as the Secretary of State for the 2010 Olympics, the Asia-Pacific Gateway and Official Languages. With his appointment he became the youngest Cabinet Minister in British Columbia's history and the fourth youngest Cabinet Minister in Canadian history. Less than three months later Harper called an election for October 14, 2008. Moore was easily re-elected in the 2008 federal election and the Conservative Party won their second minority government.

=== Minister of Canadian Heritage ===
On October 30, 2008, Moore was appointed Minister of Canadian Heritage and Official Languages. Moore's appointment came after Harper had sparked controversy during the recent election campaign when he made comments that "ordinary people" didn't care about arts funding. The comments were negatively received, particularly in Quebec, and it is thought to have contributed to the Conservatives not winning a majority government.

In the 2011 federal election Moore was once again re-elected in his riding and the Conservative Party won their first majority government. It was speculated that Moore could be promoted to a higher profile ministry when Harper shuffled his cabinet, however he remained Minister of Heritage when the new cabinet was sworn in. The resignation and defeat of several ministers did lead to his appointment as the senior regional Minister from British Columbia, he became the youngest person to ever hold the post. Moore was seen as one of the most influential members within his caucus, and with Prime Minister Harper. Though Harper did not appoint a Deputy Prime Minister, Jason Kenney was seen by many as the de facto Deputy Prime Minister. Maclean's columnist Paul Wells wrote in 2011 that Moore, whose views contrast with the more socially conservative Kenney, was a near-equal to Kenney within cabinet. Moore's portfolio was an important one to Quebeckers and, with only four Conservative members of Parliament in the province, Moore became a central figure in the province for the party, despite hailing from British Columbia.

==== CBC ====
As Minister of Canadian Heritage Moore was nominally responsible for the Canadian Broadcasting Corporation (CBC), a Crown corporation. On November 19, 2008, Moore warned CBC executives to rein in their spending practises after it was revealed that CBC's executive vice-president for French services, racked up more than $80,000 in 2006 on expenses such as theatre tickets, hotels, and catering. The information was revealed the same week that other Canadian broadcasters were announcing hiring freezes and layoffs. The President of CBC announced on November 21, 2008 that the corporation would be cutting spending and reviewing its major projects.

Moore has been a defender of the CBC and has spoken about its importance as a key cultural institution. This despite calls from some within the Conservative Party to stop funding or sell the CBC. Downsizing and decentralizing of the broadcaster is a goal for Moore and the Conservative government. In December 2011, he stated that under his leadership staffing at the CBC had decreased by about 25%.

==== Interim Minister of Aboriginal Affairs ====
On February 15, 2013, Prime Minister Stephen Harper appointed Moore as acting Minister of Aboriginal Affairs and Northern Development after the sudden resignation of John Duncan. Duncan resigned after improperly advocating to a tax court on behalf of a constituent in June 2011. Moore remained interim minister until Bernard Valcourt was appointed on February 22, 2013.

=== Minister of Industry ===
On July 15, 2013, Moore was appointed Minister of Industry. As Minister of Industry, Moore Chaired the Cabinet Committee on Economic prosperity, which was responsible for considering all economic proposals.

==== Internal Free Trade ====
in 2014 Moore made a major effort to open Canada's internal markets to greater free trade. Tabling a report entitled "One Canada, One National Economy," he outlined options for improving Canada's existing Agreement on Internal Trade or starting anew with default open market access across Canada for domestic goods and services.

==== Digital Policy ====
While serving as Minister, Moore successfully passed Bill S-4, also known as the "Digital Privacy Act," a sweeping set of changes to modernize Canada's online privacy laws, including the Personal Information Protection and Electronic Documents Act (PIPEDA). He also implemented a series of spectrum auctions (700 MHz, 2500 MHz and AWS-3) to put as much spectrum into the market for use by wireless providers to create competition. He also established the "Connecting Canadians" program to bring internet connectivity to rural and remote communities, as well as the modernized "Computers for Schools" program for those without access to computers. He also implemented a new cell tower sharing policy to encourage competition and mandatory community consultations on cell tower placement and construction.

==== Space Policy ====
As Minister, Moore developed and implemented a new space policy framework for Canada, including funding and full participation in the James Webb Space Telescope, the international 30 Metre Telescope, renewed membership in the European Space Agency, and a commitment to the International Space Station through 2024 with funding for 2 Canadian astronauts to complete missions to space.

On December 15, 2013 while commenting on a report that B.C. had the worst rate of child poverty in Canada, Moore said, "Is it my job to feed my neighbour's child? I don't think so" to Vancouver radio station News1130 reporter Sara Norman. His comments were criticized as "dismissive" and Scrooge-like, especially given the Christmas season. Initially the minister denied making any such statement in a series of tweets. On December 16, Moore issued a written apology on his website.

== Out of politics ==
On June 19, 2015, Moore announced he was not running as a candidate in the 2015 federal election. In November 2015, it was announced that Moore had been chosen to be the next chancellor of the University of Northern British Columbia, his alma mater, starting a three-year term in May 2016. He also works at the global law firm Dentons as a senior business advisor, and a policy advisor at the global firm Edelman. In September 2016, it was announced that Moore joined the national board of the Canadian Cancer Society as vice chair.

== Election results ==
2000 Canadian federal election: Port Moody—Coquitlam—Port Coquitlam
Party	Candidate	Votes	%	±%	Expenditures
Alliance	James Moore	28,631	49.69	+14.12	$59,661
Liberal	Lou Sekora	16,937	29.39	–9.97	$71,922
New Democratic	Jamie Arden	5,340	9.27	–7.72	$25,248
Progressive Conservative	Joe Gluska	4,506	7.82	+3.00	$4,011
Green	Dave King	839	1.46	–0.87	none listed
Marijuana	Paul A. Geddes	818	1.42	–	$647
Canadian Action	Will Arlow	452	0.78	+0.24	$2,886
Communist	George Gidora	98	0.17	–	$189
Total valid votes		57,621	99.68		
Total rejected ballots		187	0.32	–	
Turnout		57,808	63.37	–	
Eligible voters		91,222			
Alliance gain from Liberal		Swing		+12.04	
Change for the Canadian Alliance is based on the Reform Party.
Source: Elections Canada

2004 Canadian federal election: Port Moody—Westwood—Port Coquitlam
Party	Candidate	Votes	%	Expenditures
Conservative	James Moore	18,664	40.94	$67,285.37
Liberal	Kwangyul Peck	12,445	27.30	$69,963.41
New Democratic	Charley King	12,023	26.38	$54,351.85
Green	Richard Voigt	1,971	4.32	$643.69
Libertarian	Lewis C. Dahlby	276	0.61	none listed
Canadian Action	Pat Goff	111	0.24	$869.04
Communist	George Gidora	94	0.21	$389.85
Total valid votes/expense limit		45,584	99.63	$74,271.77
Total rejected ballots		169	0.37	
Turnout		45,753	62.96	
Eligible voters		72,670		
Conservative notional hold		Swing		–
This riding was created from parts of Port Moody—Coquitlam—Port Coquitlam, where Canadian Alliance candidate James Moore was the incumbent.
Source: Elections Canada

2006 Canadian federal election: Port Moody—Westwood—Port Coquitlam
Party	Candidate	Votes	%	±%	Expenditures
Conservative	James Moore	19,961	41.12	+0.18	$71,630.04
Liberal	Jon Kingsbury	13,134	27.06	–0.24	$60,319.95
New Democratic	Mary-Woo Sims	11,196	23.07	–3.31	$25,720.38
Independent	Greg Watrich	2,317	4.77	–	$26,562.70
Green	Scott Froom	1,623	3.34	–0.98	$1,530.93
Libertarian	Lewis C. Dahlby	309	0.64	+0.03	$508.06
Total valid votes/expense limit		48,540	99.71	–	$78,173.33
Total rejected ballots		141	0.29	–0.08	
Turnout		48,681	63.20	+0.23	
Eligible voters		77,033			
Conservative hold		Swing		+0.22	
Source: Elections Canada

2008 Canadian federal election: Port Moody—Westwood—Port Coquitlam
Party	Candidate	Votes	%	±%	Expenditures
Conservative	James Moore	25,535	54.61	+13.49	$72,792.25
New Democratic	Zoe Royer	10,418	22.28	–0.79	$15,219.75
Liberal	Ron McKinnon	6,918	14.79	–12.26	$31,254.58
Green	Rod Brindamour	3,568	7.63	+4.29	$2,440.25
Libertarian	Rob Gillespie	321	0.69	+0.05	none listed
Total valid votes/expense limit		46,760	99.64	–	$85,284.02
Total rejected ballots		168	0.36	+0.07	
Turnout		46,928	58.83	–4.37	
Eligible voters		79,772			
Conservative hold		Swing		+7.14	
Source: Elections Canada

2011 Canadian federal election: Port Moody—Westwood—Port Coquitlam
Party	Candidate	Votes	%	±%	Expenditures
Conservative	James Moore	27,181	56.07	+1.47	$83,194.50
New Democratic	Mark Ireland	14,600	30.12	+7.84	$2,451.88
Liberal	Stewart McGillivray	4,110	8.48	–6.32	$3,132.73
Green	Kevin Kim	2,161	4.46	–3.17	$1,327.44
Libertarian	Paul A. Geddes	421	0.87	+0.18	none listed
Total valid votes/expense limit		48,473	99.61	–	$91,072.64
Total rejected ballots		188	0.39	+0.03	
Turnout		48,661	56.46	–2.37	
Eligible voters		86,190			
Conservative hold		Swing		–3.19	
Source: Elections Canada

28th Canadian Ministry (2006–2015) – Cabinet of Stephen Harper
Cabinet posts (3)
Predecessor	Office	Successor
John Duncan	Minister of Aboriginal Affairs and Northern Development; February 15–22, 2013	Bernard Valcourt
Josée Verner	Minister of Canadian Heritage and Official Languages; 2008–2013	Shelly Glover
Christian Paradis	Minister of Industry; 2013–2015	Navdeep Bains
Sub-Cabinet Post
Predecessor	Title	Successor
Position created in 2008	Secretary of State for Foreign Affairs and International Trade (2008/06/25 – 2008/10/29)	Position abolished in 2008
