= Ron McKinnon =

Canadian politician (born 1951)

Ron McKinnon MP

Member of Parliament for Coquitlam—Port Coquitlam
- Incumbent
- Assumed office October 19, 2015
- Preceded by: James Moore

Personal details
- Born: August 8, 1951 (age 75) Alberta
- Party: Liberal
- Education: University of Alberta; Southern Alberta Institute of Technology
- Profession: Computer Systems Analyst

Kenneth Ronald McKinnon MP (born August 8, 1951) is a Canadian politician. He is a member of the Liberal Party and has represented Coquitlam—Port Coquitlam in the House of Commons of Canada since the 2015 federal election. He was re-elected in 2019, 2021 and 2025.

== Early life and education ==
Born in Alberta, McKinnon holds a Bachelor of Science from the University of Alberta and an honours diploma in Computer Technology from the Southern Alberta Institute of Technology.

== Political career ==
McKinnon first ran for election in the 2008 federal election in Port Moody—Westwood—Port Coquitlam, but was defeated, receiving just 14.8% of the votes.

In the 2015 federal election, McKinnon ran again in the newly created riding of Coquitlam—Port Coquitlam, which was created in the 2012 federal electoral redistribution. He was elected, receiving 35.3% of the vote, defeating Conservative Party candidate Douglas Horne, a former BC Liberal member of the Legislative Assembly of British Columbia (MLA). His victory was seen as a surprise by many, as the area had consistently voted Conservative prior.

During the 42nd Parliament, McKinnon introduced Bill C-224, the Good Samaritan Drug Overdose Act in the House of Commons on February 22, 2016. The bill amended the Controlled Drugs and Substances Act to grant immunity from prosecution for the possession of controlled substances when individuals seek emergency medical assistance for someone experiencing a drug overdose. This aimed to reduce the fear of arrest and encourage people to seek the necessary medical care. The bill was adopted on May 4, 2017, with support from all parties.

McKinnon was re-elected in the 2019 federal election, receiving 34.7% of the votes. During the 43rd Parliament, McKinnon was elected Chair of the Standing Committee on Health.

In the 2021 federal election, McKinnon was again re-elected, receiving 38.5% of the vote. During the 44th Parliament, he was elected Chair of the Standing Committee on Public Safety and National Security. On March 6, 2023 he introduced a private member's bill, Bill C-316, the Court Challenges Program Act which would enshrine the Court Challenges Program into Canadian law, a government-funded initiative that supports Canadians challenging laws and regulations that they believe violate their rights.

In the 2025 Canadian federal election, McKinnon was re-elected, receiving 47.4% of the votes, his highest ever result. He defeated former BC Liberal MLA and cabinet minister Iain Black. He was elected vice chair of the Standing Joint Committee on Scrutiny of Regulations in the 45th Canadian Parliament in 2025.

McKinnon has previously supported electoral reform, and proposed Canada adopt a ranked pairs voting system.

== Personal life ==
He is married to Christine and has two daughters, Katherine and Sarah.

== Electoral record ==
2025 Canadian federal election: Coquitlam—Port Coquitlam
Party	Candidate	Votes	%	±%	Expenditures
Liberal	Ron McKinnon	27,250	47.37	+9.45	$99,370.86
Conservative	Iain Black	24,730	42.99	+12.87	$125,978.48
New Democratic	Laura Dupont	4,253	7.39	–20.21	$55,430.60
Libertarian	Lewis Clarke Dahlby	785	1.37	–	none listed
Green	Michael Peter Glenister	504	0.88	–	none listed
Total valid votes/expense limit		57,522	99.50	–	$129,262.73
Total rejected ballots		287	0.50	–0.22	
Turnout		57,809	69.42	+9.59	
Eligible voters		83,272			
Liberal notional hold		Swing		–1.71	
Source: Elections Canada

2021 Canadian federal election: Coquitlam—Port Coquitlam
Party	Candidate	Votes	%	±%	Expenditures
Liberal	Ron McKinnon	21,454	38.51	+3.82	$102,642.38
Conservative	Katerina Anastasiadis	16,907	30.35	–3.67	$103,619.84
New Democratic	Laura Dupont	14,982	26.89	+3.89	$40,665.29
People's	Kimberly Brundell	2,373	4.26	+3.05	$3,258.67
Total valid votes/expense limit		55,716	99.28	–	$121,343.71
Total rejected ballots		402	0.72	+0.18	
Turnout		56,118	59.84	–3.29	
Eligible voters		93,787			
Liberal hold		Swing		+3.75	
Source: Elections Canada

2019 Canadian federal election: Coquitlam—Port Coquitlam
Party	Candidate	Votes	%	±%	Expenditures
Liberal	Ron McKinnon	20,178	34.69	–0.60	$98,093.09
Conservative	Nicholas Insley	19,788	34.01	+2.02	$112,770.90
New Democratic	Christina Gower	13,383	23.00	–4.25	$14,453.89
Green	Brad Nickason	4,025	6.92	+3.25	$1,557.30
People's	Roland Spornicu	703	1.21	–	$2,724.85
Veterans Coalition	Dan Iova	98	0.17	–	none listed
Total valid votes/expense limit		58,175	99.46	–	$116,777.51
Total rejected ballots		314	0.54	+0.03	
Turnout		58,489	63.13	–3.60	
Eligible voters		92,653			
Liberal hold		Swing		–1.31	
Source: Elections Canada

2015 Canadian federal election: Coquitlam—Port Coquitlam
Party	Candidate	Votes	%	±%	Expenditures
Liberal	Ron McKinnon	19,938	35.28	+27.02	$22,747.95
Conservative	Douglas Horne	18,083	32.00	–23.53	$168,292.26
New Democratic	Sara Norman	15,400	27.25	–3.72	$25,811.51
Green	Brad Nickason	2,076	3.67	–0.66	$5,259.89
Libertarian	Lewis Clarke Dahlby	1,014	1.79	–	none listed
Total valid votes/expense limit		56,511	99.49		$221,031.20
Total rejected ballots		287	0.51	–	
Turnout		56,798	66.73	–	
Eligible voters		85,122			
Liberal gain from Conservative		Swing		+25.27	
Source: Elections Canada

2008 Canadian federal election: Port Moody—Westwood—Port Coquitlam
Party	Candidate	Votes	%	±%	Expenditures
Conservative	James Moore	25,535	54.61	+13.49	$72,792.25
New Democratic	Zoe Royer	10,418	22.28	–0.79	$15,219.75
Liberal	Ron McKinnon	6,918	14.79	–12.26	$31,254.58
Green	Rod Brindamour	3,568	7.63	+4.29	$2,440.25
Libertarian	Rob Gillespie	321	0.69	+0.05	none listed
Total valid votes/expense limit		46,760	99.64	–	$85,284.02
Total rejected ballots		168	0.36	+0.07	
Turnout		46,928	58.83	–4.37	
Eligible voters		79,772			
Conservative hold		Swing		+7.14	
Source: Elections Canada
