= Lou Sekora =

Canadian politician (1931–2026)

Councillor of Coquitlam
- In office 2005–2014
- In office 1972–1988

Mayor of Coquitlam
- In office 1983–1997
- Succeeded by: Jon Kingsbury

Member of the Canadian Parliament for Port Moody—Coquitlam
- In office 1998–2000
- Preceded by: Sharon Hayes
- Succeeded by: James Moore

Personal details
- Born: November 4, 1931 Hafford, Saskatchewan, Canada
- Died: August 1, 2026 (aged 94) Coquitlam, British Columbia, Canada
- Party: Liberal Party of Canada

Louis Sekora (November 4, 1931 – August 1, 2026) was a Canadian politician.

== Life and career ==
Born in Hafford, Saskatchewan, Sekora served as mayor of Coquitlam, British Columbia, from 1983 to 1997. He was first elected to city council in 1972. A series of acting mayors replaced him, eventually followed by Jon Kingsbury who served from 1998 to 2005.

Sekora resigned to run in a 1998 by-election and was elected to the House of Commons of Canada as a candidate of the Liberal Party of Canada, representing the riding of Port Moody—Coquitlam. In the 2000 general election, he lost his seat to Canadian Alliance candidate James Moore.

Following his loss, he was appointed a part-time Citizenship Judge by Prime Minister Jean Chrétien.

In 2005, he was elected back to the Coquitlam City Council as an independent.

In 2014, he ran for Mayor of Coquitlam again, but was defeated by incumbent Richard Stewart.

Sekora died on August 1, 2026, at the age of 94.
