= Coquitlam—Port Coquitlam =

Federal electoral district in British Columbia, Canada

Coordinates: 49.36°N 122.73°W

British Columbia electoral district
- Interactive map of riding boundaries from the 2025 federal election

Federal electoral district
- Legislature: House of Commons
MP
Ron McKinnon
Liberal
- District created: 2013
- First contested: 2015
- Last contested: 2025
- District webpage: profile, map

Demographics
- Population (2016): 123,576
- Electors (2019): 91,889
- Area (km²): 650
- Pop. density (per km²): 190.1
- Census division: Metro Vancouver
- Census subdivision(s): Coquitlam (part), Port Coquitlam, Coquitlam

Coquitlam—Port Coquitlam is a federal electoral district in British Columbia. It encompasses a portion of the former electoral district of Port Moody—Westwood—Port Coquitlam.

== History ==
Coquitlam—Port Coquitlam was created by the 2012 federal electoral boundaries redistribution and was legally defined in the 2013 representation order. It came into effect upon the call of the 2015 Canadian federal election, where Liberal MP Ron McKinnon won in the riding.

Following the 2022 electoral redistribution, Coquitlam—Port Coquitlam lost the Eagle Ridge area and the western half of the Westwood Plateau to Port Moody—Coquitlam.

== Demographics ==
According to the 2021 Canadian census

Faith in Coquitlam--Port Coquitlam (2021)
1. No religion (50.9%)
2. Christian (36.8%)
3. Muslim (6.20%)
4. Buddhist (2.00%)
5. Sikh (1.40%)
6. Hindu (1.10%)
7. Jewish (0.40%)
8. Other faiths (1.40%)
- Twenty most common ethnic origins (2021) : 18.5% Chinese, 14.6% English, 11.5% Scottish, 9.1% Irish, 7.9% Canadian, 6.9% German, 5.6% Iranian, 5.5% Korean, 4.1% French, 4.0% Italian, 4.0% Filipino, 3.1% Indian (India), 3.1% Ukrainian, 2.8% Russian, 2.6% Polish, 2.6% British Isles, 2.4% Dutch, 1.9% Norwegian, 1.9% Persian, 1.8% European

Panethnic groups in Coquitlam—Port Coquitlam (2011−2021)
Panethnic group	2021		2016		2011	
Panethnic group	Pop.	%	Pop.	%	Pop.	%
European (Note: Statistic includes all persons that did not make up part of a visible minority or an indigenous identity.)	60,075	46.03%	63,155	51.53%	62,400	56.98%
East Asian (Note: Statistic includes total responses of "Chinese", "Korean", and "Japanese" under visible minority section on census.)	35,265	27.02%	31,605	25.79%	24,500	22.37%
Middle Eastern (Note: Statistic includes total responses of "West Asian" and "Arab" under visible minority section on census.)	11,125	8.52%	7,860	6.41%	6,140	5.61%
Southeast Asian (Note: Statistic includes total responses of "Filipino" and "Southeast Asian" under visible minority section on census.)	6,745	5.17%	5,940	4.85%	4,595	4.2%
South Asian	6,200	4.75%	5,135	4.19%	4,740	4.33%
Indigenous	2,890	2.21%	3,125	2.55%	2,585	2.36%
Latin American	2,810	2.15%	1,980	1.62%	1,820	1.66%
African	1,915	1.47%	1,465	1.2%	1,210	1.1%
Other (Note: Statistic includes total responses of "Visible minority, n.i.e." and "Multiple visible minorities" under visible minority section on census.)	3,515	2.69%	2,270	1.85%	1,520	1.39%
Total responses	130,525	98.88%	122,550	99.17%	109,505	99.33%
Total population	132,004	100%	123,576	100%	110,241	100%
Notes: Totals greater than 100% due to multiple origin responses. Demographics based on 2012 Canadian federal electoral redistribution riding boundaries.

== Members of Parliament ==
This riding has elected the following members of the House of Commons of Canada:

Parliament	Years	Member	Party
Coquitlam—Port Coquitlam; Riding created from Port Moody—Westwood—Port Coquitlam
42nd	2015–2019	Ron McKinnon	Liberal
43rd	2019–2021	Ron McKinnon	Liberal
44th	2021–2025	Ron McKinnon	Liberal
45th	2025–present	Ron McKinnon	Liberal

== Election results ==
View source data.
Graph of election results in Coquitlam—Port Coquitlam (minor parties that never got 2% of the vote or didn't run consistently are omitted)

=== 2023 representation order ===
2025 Canadian federal election
Party	Candidate	Votes	%	±%	Expenditures
Liberal	Ron McKinnon	27,250	47.37	+9.45	$99,370.86
Conservative	Iain Black	24,730	42.99	+12.87	$125,978.48
New Democratic	Laura Dupont	4,253	7.39	–20.21	$55,430.60
Libertarian	Lewis Clarke Dahlby	785	1.37	–	none listed
Green	Michael Peter Glenister	504	0.88	–	none listed
Total valid votes/expense limit		57,522	99.50	–	$129,262.73
Total rejected ballots		287	0.50	–0.22	
Turnout		57,809	69.42	+9.59	
Eligible voters		83,272			
Liberal notional hold		Swing		–1.71	
Source: Elections Canada

2021 federal election redistributed results
Party	Vote	%
Liberal	18,178	37.92
Conservative	14,437	30.12
New Democratic	13,228	27.60
People's	2,093	4.37

=== 2013 representation order ===
2021 Canadian federal election
Party	Candidate	Votes	%	±%	Expenditures
Liberal	Ron McKinnon	21,454	38.51	+3.82	$102,642.38
Conservative	Katerina Anastasiadis	16,907	30.35	–3.67	$103,619.84
New Democratic	Laura Dupont	14,982	26.89	+3.89	$40,665.29
People's	Kimberly Brundell	2,373	4.26	+3.05	$3,258.67
Total valid votes/expense limit		55,716	99.28	–	$121,343.71
Total rejected ballots		402	0.72	+0.18	
Turnout		56,118	59.84	–3.29	
Eligible voters		93,787			
Liberal hold		Swing		+3.75	
Source: Elections Canada

2019 Canadian federal election
Party	Candidate	Votes	%	±%	Expenditures
Liberal	Ron McKinnon	20,178	34.69	–0.60	$98,093.09
Conservative	Nicholas Insley	19,788	34.01	+2.02	$112,770.90
New Democratic	Christina Gower	13,383	23.00	–4.25	$14,453.89
Green	Brad Nickason	4,025	6.92	+3.25	$1,557.30
People's	Roland Spornicu	703	1.21	–	$2,724.85
Veterans Coalition	Dan Iova	98	0.17	–	none listed
Total valid votes/expense limit		58,175	99.46	–	$116,777.51
Total rejected ballots		314	0.54	+0.03	
Turnout		58,489	63.13	–3.60	
Eligible voters		92,653			
Liberal hold		Swing		–1.31	
Source: Elections Canada

2015 Canadian federal election
Party	Candidate	Votes	%	±%	Expenditures
Liberal	Ron McKinnon	19,938	35.28	+27.02	$22,747.95
Conservative	Douglas Horne	18,083	32.00	–23.53	$168,292.26
New Democratic	Sara Norman	15,400	27.25	–3.72	$25,811.51
Green	Brad Nickason	2,076	3.67	–0.66	$5,259.89
Libertarian	Lewis Clarke Dahlby	1,014	1.79	–	none listed
Total valid votes/expense limit		56,511	99.49		$221,031.20
Total rejected ballots		287	0.51	–	
Turnout		56,798	66.73	–	
Eligible voters		85,122			
Liberal gain from Conservative		Swing		+25.27	
Source: Elections Canada

2011 federal election redistributed results
Party	Vote	%
Conservative	22,371	55.53
New Democratic	12,477	30.97
Liberal	3,330	8.27
Green	1,744	4.33
Others	364	0.90

== See also ==
- List of Canadian electoral districts
- Historical federal electoral districts of Canada
