= Douglas Horne =

Canadian politician

Member of the British Columbia Legislative Assembly for Coquitlam-Burke Mountain
- In office May 12, 2009 – August 11, 2015
- Preceded by: Riding Established
- Succeeded by: Jodie Wickens

Personal details
- Born: 1966 (age 59–60)
- Party: BC Liberal (Provincial), Conservative (Federal)

Douglas Horne is a former Canadian politician who served as a BC Liberal member of the Legislative Assembly of British Columbia for the riding of Coquitlam-Burke Mountain from 2009 to 2015.

Horne was first elected in the 2009 provincial election. He served as the Deputy Speaker of the Legislative Assembly of British Columbia between 2013 and 2015. He also served as the Premier's Parliamentary Secretary, as well as Deputy Chair of the Committee of the Whole (Chair of the Committee of Supply). In addition, he served as the Chair of the Select Standing Committee on Finance and Government Services (2012–13), Deputy Chair of the Select Standing Committee for Public Accounts (2009–13) and a Member of the Select Standing Committee for Children and Youth (2009–13) for the Legislative Assembly of British Columbia. He also served on the Provincial Treasury Board, the Legislative Review Committee, and the Local Government Elections Task Force during his first term of office.

Prior to being elected, Horne was a corporate executive specializing in corporate finance and business development.

Horne resigned from the legislature on August 14, 2015, to run as the Conservative Party of Canada candidate for Coquitlam—Port Coquitlam in the 2015 election. He lost to Ron McKinnon of the Liberal Party.

Following his time in office, Horne returned to the private sector and founded Golden Leaf Capital Group, a boutique investment and project management firm based in Vancouver. Projects under development include Evanesce Packaging Solutions Inc., a company bringing to market a proprietary compostable packaging material.

== Electoral record ==
=== Federal ===
2015 Canadian federal election: Coquitlam—Port Coquitlam
Party	Candidate	Votes	%	±%	Expenditures
Liberal	Ron McKinnon	19,938	35.28	+27.02	$22,747.95
Conservative	Douglas Horne	18,083	32.00	–23.53	$168,292.26
New Democratic	Sara Norman	15,400	27.25	–3.72	$25,811.51
Green	Brad Nickason	2,076	3.67	–0.66	$5,259.89
Libertarian	Lewis Clarke Dahlby	1,014	1.79	–	none listed
Total valid votes/expense limit		56,511	99.49		$221,031.20
Total rejected ballots		287	0.51	–	
Turnout		56,798	66.73	–	
Eligible voters		85,122			
Liberal gain from Conservative		Swing		+25.27	
Source: Elections Canada

=== Provincial ===
2013 British Columbia general election: Coquitlam-Burke Mountain
Party	Candidate	Votes	%	±%	Expenditures
Liberal	Douglas Horne	9,766	49.90	-6.93	$97,947
New Democratic	Chris Wilson	7,315	37.37	+1.91	$55,655
Green	Ron Peters	1,144	5.84	-0.12	$0
Conservative	Shane Kennedy	1,071	5.47	–	$1,491
Libertarian	Paul Geddes	277	1.42	-0.33	$4,753
Total valid votes		19,573	100.00		
Total rejected ballots		152	0.77	-0.10	
Turnout		19,725	53.23	+4.37	
Eligible voters		37,056			
Liberal hold		Swing		+4.42	

2009 British Columbia general election: Coquitlam-Burke Mountain
Party	Candidate	Votes	%	±%	Expenditures
Liberal	Douglas Horne	8,644	56.83	+2.3	$87,288
New Democratic	Heather McRitchie	5,393	35.46	-1.9	$23,778
Green	Jared Evans	907	5.96	–	$300
Libertarian	Paul Geddes	266	1.75	–	$250
Total valid votes		15,210	100.00		
Total rejected ballots		133	0.87	–	
Turnout		15,343	48.86	–	
Eligible voters		31,397			
Liberal notional hold		Swing		+2.10	
