= Mary-Woo Sims =

Hong Kong-Canadian social justice activist

Mary-Woo Sims (沈明麗) is a former social justice activist and politician. Best known as a former chief commissioner of the British Columbia Human Rights Commission, Sims was also a candidate for the New Democratic Party in the electoral district of Port Moody—Westwood—Port Coquitlam in the 2006 federal election.

Born in Hong Kong, Sims first came to Canada as a student in 1970. She became a Canadian citizen in 1978.

A longtime community activist in both Vancouver and Toronto, Sims was associated with a significant number of non-governmental, union, government and non-profit human rights agencies and commissions. Sims was a founding member of the Women Against Violence Against Women or WAVAW Rape Crisis Centre in Vancouver. Sims participated in the BC Federation of Labour's Women's Rights Committee in the mid-1970s and helped write some of the early anti sexual harassment and affirmative action policies. During her career with the BC Telephone Company, now Telus, she was an active member of the Telecommunications Workers' Union. Sims' labour experience included work with the International Ladies Garment Workers' Union as a union organizer.

Sims moved to Winnipeg to start a job with the Canadian Human Rights Commission and eventually moved to its Toronto office where she continued her labour activism becoming the president of her local with the Union of Solicitor General Employees. Before moving on to become the manager of human rights and employment equity with the then Municipality of Metropolitan Toronto or Metro Toronto, Sims was a service representative with the Public Service Alliance of Canada's office in Toronto. While at Metro Toronto, Sims helped draft the first AIDS in the Workplace Policy covering the treatment of employees and members of the public diagnosed with HIV/AIDS. She helped to develop leading and innovative policies and educational programs in human rights, employment equity and anti-harassment. Sims sat on consultation committees that helped to frame Ontario's Employment Equity Act.

Sims' work in human and equality rights was recognized through appointments to the Premier of Ontario's Anti-Racism Advisory Committee, the Ontario Human Rights Commission's Board of Inquiry, the provincial pay equity tribunal, the Ontario Employment Equity Tribunal, and the Ontario Civilian Commission on Police Services. Before her government appointments, Sims was co-chair of the Campaign for Equal Families that fought for an omnibus bill that would recognize gay and lesbian partnerships and families in Ontario legislation.

Sims moved back to Vancouver in 1996 to accept an appointment as the chief human rights commissioner for British Columbia. In that role, she represented BC at the Canadian Association of Statutory Human Rights Agencies (CASHRA) and was elected by CASHRA to represent it at the 2001 World Conference against Racism, Xenophobia and Related Intolerance or WCAR. CASHRA also elected Sims to sit on the board of the International Association of Official Human Rights Agencies (IAOHRA) as its Canadian representative. At the helm of the commission, Sims hosted IAOHRA's conference "Human Rights for the next Millennium" in Vancouver in 2000.

An out lesbian, she won the Metropolitan Community Church of Toronto’s "Honouring our Heroes" Award in 1993, as well as awards from Gay Asians of Toronto and the Chinese Canadian National Council. Sims has also won other awards recognizing her work in human rights education and in community.

Sims' tenure with the BC commission was controversial as she recommended expanding the Human Rights Code to include gender identity and social condition while refusing to protect youth suffering age-related discrimination. She also advocated the re-introduction of terminology that would enable a person to allege discrimination "unless there was reasonable cause" to prove otherwise. Sims also defended decisions of the BC Human Rights Tribunal, in particular a ruling of the Tribunal that found that a Jehovah's Witness had been discriminated against when his employer dismissed him because he refused to put up Christmas decorations contrary to his religious beliefs. In 2001, she was controversially fired from the position by Premier Gordon Campbell a year before the end of her appointed term.

Sims continued her work in social justice and in community through her work in Ardent Consulting, a firm that did human rights investigations, mediation and education work for union, corporate and government clients in Canada. She was also a board member of Vancouver Co-op Radio, IAM Cares, the Women's Legal Education and Action Fund and Canadians for Equal Marriage.

Sims was also an opinion columnist with the Tri-City News, a local newspaper covering Port Moody, Coquitlam and Port Coquitlam.

Sims moved for a time to Australia to look after her father who suffered from Parkinson's related dementia. Sims now spends her time between Canada and Australia and is writing her first book.

Sims received honorary Doctor of Law degrees from the University of British Columbia and Simon Fraser University in 2025.

== Works ==
Sims, M. (2002). Human rights issues in British Columbia. International Journal of Public Administration, 25(1), 83-89. doi:10.1081/PAD-120006540
