= Port Moody—Westwood—Port Coquitlam =

Former federal electoral district in British Columbia, Canada

Coordinates: 49.41°N 122.73°W

British Columbia electoral district
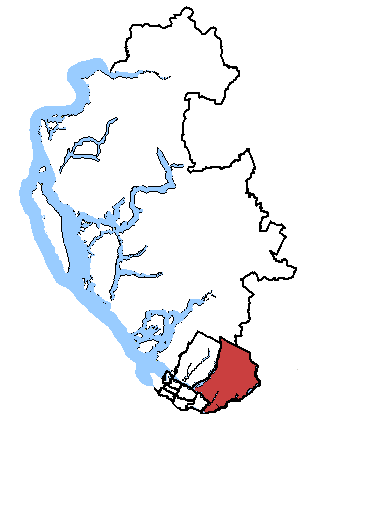
- Port Moody—Westwood—Port Coquitlam in relation to other Greater Vancouver federal electoral ridings.

Defunct federal electoral district
- Legislature: House of Commons
- District created: 2003
- District abolished: 2012
- First contested: 2004
- Last contested: 2011
- District webpage: profile, map

Demographics
- Population (2011): 129,706
- Electors (2011): 79,772
- Area (km²): 649.35
- Census division: Greater Vancouver
- Census subdivision(s): Coquitlam, Port Coquitlam, Port Moody, Greater Vancouver A, Coquitlam 2, Anmore, Belcarra

Port Moody—Westwood—Port Coquitlam was a federal electoral district in British Columbia, Canada, that was represented in the House of Commons of Canada from 2004 to 2015.

== Demographics ==
Population, 2001	109,394
Electors	72,670
Area (km^{2})	
Population density (people per km^{2})	

Consisting of the following parts of the Greater Vancouver Regional District:

(a) the villages of Anmore and Belcarra;

(b) the City of Port Coquitlam;

(c) the following parts of Subdivision A:

(i) that part lying easterly of Indian Arm and the Indian River and northerly of the City of Coquitlam and the Village of Anmore;

(ii) that part on the north shoreline of Burrard Inlet within the City of Port Moody;

(iii) Boulder Island;

(d) that part of the City of Coquitlam lying northerly of Highway No. 7A (Barnet Highway, Lougheed Highway);

(e) that part of the City of Port Moody lying northerly of a line described as follows: commencing at the intersection of the easterly limit of said city with Guildford Drive; thence westerly along said drive, its production and Murray Street to the southerly production of the most southeasterly point of Port Moody in Burrard Inlet (at Inlet Park); thence northerly along said production to said port; thence generally westerly along said port to the westerly limit of said city; and

(f) Coquitlam Indian Reserve No. 2.

== History ==
This riding was created by the 2003 Representation Order from Port Moody—Coquitlam—Port Coquitlam riding.

The 2012 electoral redistribution will see this riding dissolved into Coquitlam—Port Coquitlam and Port Moody—Coquitlam for the 2015 election.

== Members of Parliament ==
Parliament	Years	Member	Party
Riding created from Port Moody—Coquitlam—Port Coquitlam
38th	2004–2006	James Moore	Conservative
39th	2006–2008	James Moore	Conservative
40th	2008–2011	James Moore	Conservative
41st	2011–2015	James Moore	Conservative
Riding dissolved into Coquitlam—Port Coquitlam and Port Moody—Coquitlam

=== Current member of Parliament ===
Its member of Parliament was The Honourable James Moore, a former broadcaster. He was first elected in 2000, and is a member of the Conservative Party of Canada. He was re-elected in the 2004, 2006, and 2008 elections. Moore was the Secretary of State for Official Languages, Pacific Gateway and the Vancouver-Whistler Olympics before the cabinet shuffle announced on October 30, 2008, when he was appointed Minister of Canadian Heritage and Official Languages.

== Election results ==
2011 Canadian federal election
Party	Candidate	Votes	%	±%	Expenditures
Conservative	James Moore	27,181	56.07	+1.46	$83,988.73
New Democratic	Mark Ireland	14,600	30.12	+7.84	$2,513.96
Liberal	Stewart McGillivray	4,110	8.48	-6.31	$3,574.30
Green	Kevin Kim	2,161	4.46	-3.17	$1,335.48
Libertarian	Paul Geddes	421	0.87	+0.18	$0.00
Total valid votes/expense limit		48,473	100.00	–	$91,072.64
Total rejected ballots		188	0.39	+0.03	
Turnout		48,661	57.23	-2.49	
Eligible voters		85,028			
Conservative hold		Swing		-3.19	

2008 Canadian federal election
Party	Candidate	Votes	%	±%	Expenditures
Conservative	James Moore	25,535	54.61%	+13.49%	$76,521.14
New Democratic	Zoë Royer	10,418	22.28%	-0.78%	$14,957.53
Liberal	Ron McKinnon	6,918	14.79%	-12.26%	$32,213.85
Green	Rod Brindamour	3,568	7.63%	+4.29%	$2,240.25
Libertarian	Lewis Dahlby	321	0.69%	+0.06%	
Total valid votes		46,760			
Total rejected ballots		168			
Turnout		46,928	59.72%	-3.47%	
Conservative hold		Swing		+7.14	

2006 Canadian federal election
Party	Candidate	Votes	%	±%	Expenditures
Conservative	James Moore	19,961	41.12%	+0.18%	$73,294.85
Liberal	Jon Kingsbury	13,134	27.05%	-0.25%	$60,974.96
New Democratic	Mary-Woo Sims	11,196	23.06%	-3.31%	$25,808.51
Independent	Greg Watrich	2,317	4.77%		$26,557.70
Green	Scott Froom	1,623	3.34%	-0.98%	$1,530.93
Libertarian	Lewis Dahlby	309	0.63%	+0.03%	$508.06
Total valid votes		48,540			
Total rejected ballots		141			
Turnout		48,681	63.19%	+0.23%	
Conservative hold		Swing		+0.22	

2004 Canadian federal election
Party	Candidate	Votes	%	Expenditures
Conservative	James Moore	18,664	40.94	$65,906
Liberal	Kwangyul Peck	12,445	27.30	$69,875
New Democratic	Charley King	12,023	26.37	$54,851
Green	Richard Voigt	1,971	4.32	$643
Libertarian	Lewis Dahlby	276	0.60	
Canadian Action	Pat Goff	111	0.24	$869
Communist	George Gidora	94	0.20	$389
Total valid votes		45,584	100.00	
Total rejected ballots		169	0.37	
Turnout		45,753	62.96	
This riding was created from parts of Port Moody—Coquitlam—Port Coquitlam, where Canadian Alliance candidate James Moore was the incumbent.

== See also ==
- List of Canadian electoral districts
- Historical federal electoral districts of Canada
