= Fin Donnelly =

Canadian politician (born 1966)

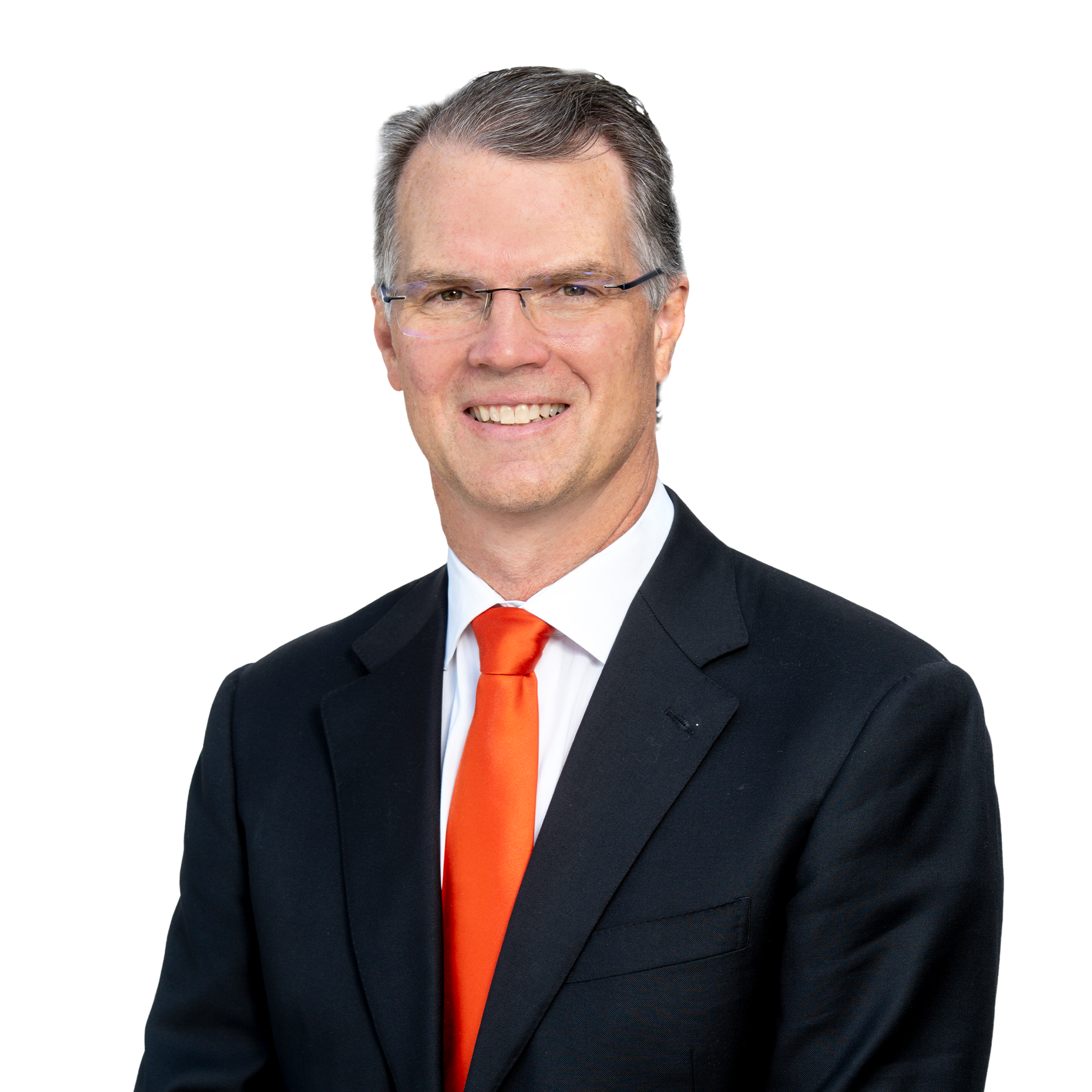

Parliamentary Secretary for Watershed Restoration of British Columbia
- In office January 20, 2023 – November 18, 2024
- Premier: David Eby
- Preceded by: Position created
- Succeeded by: Position abolished

Parliamentary Secretary for Fisheries and Aquaculture of British Columbia
- In office November 26, 2020 – December 7, 2022
- Premier: John Horgan; David Eby
- Preceded by: Position created
- Succeeded by: Kelly Greene

Member of the British Columbia Legislative Assembly for Coquitlam-Burke Mountain
- In office October 24, 2020 – September 21, 2024
- Preceded by: Joan Isaacs
- Succeeded by: Jodie Wickens

Member of Parliament for Port Moody—Coquitlam New Westminster—Coquitlam (2009–2015)
- In office November 9, 2009 – September 11, 2019
- Preceded by: Dawn Black
- Succeeded by: Nelly Shin

Coquitlam city councillor
- In office December 2, 2002 – November 26, 2009

Personal details
- Born: May 27, 1966 (age 60) New Westminster, British Columbia
- Party: New Democrat
- Spouse: Lynda Donnelly
- Website: Official website

Fin Donnelly (born May 27, 1966) is a Canadian politician. He served as the member of the Legislative Assembly (MLA) of British Columbia for the electoral district of Coquitlam-Burke Mountain from 2020 to 2024, as part of the British Columbia New Democratic Party (BC NDP) caucus. He previously served as member of Parliament (MP) as part of the federal NDP caucus, representing New Westminster—Coquitlam from 2009 to 2015, and Port Moody—Coquitlam from 2015 to 2019.

Prior to his election as a federal MP, he served as Coquitlam city councillor from 2002 to 2009. Before that, Donnelly was a marathon swimmer from 1990 to 2002, during which time he swam the length of the Fraser River twice, as well as the Strait of Georgia, the Strait of Juan de Fuca, and across Pitt Lake, Okanagan Lake, and Quesnel Lake.

== Early life and municipal politics ==
Born in New Westminster, he graduated from the University of Victoria in 1989 with a bachelor of arts degree in philosophy and a minor in environmental studies. He swam competitively for 16 years in his college and completed 14 marathon swims between 1990 and 2000, including across Pitt Lake, Okanagan Lake, Williams Lake, Quesnel Lake, and down the Raush River. He swam across the Strait of Georgia four times, including in 1991 when he swam from Sechelt to Nanaimo in a benefit swim for the Georgia Strait Alliance. In 1994 he swam the Strait of Juan de Fuca, from Port Angeles to Victoria. In 1995, and again in 2000, Donnelly swam the length of the 1,325 km Fraser River, from Mount Robson Provincial Park to Vancouver, ending in False Creek. Many of his marathon swims were used to raise awareness of local issues affecting the rivers and lakes and their watersheds, and raise funds for non-profit groups concerned with the protection or restoration of those rivers and watersheds. Donnelly founded the non-profit organization Rivershed Society of British Columbia in 1996 and worked as its executive director.

In 2002, at the age of 36, Donnelly decided to seek election to the Coquitlam City Council. His high profile swims and campaign focused on sustainable development made him a likely candidate to upset one of the incumbents. Donnelly and Barrie Lynch were both successful in gaining a seat on council, upsetting two of the incumbents, though Donnelly's campaign manager, Cameron Lipp, unexpectedly died two weeks before the election. In his first term on council, Donnelly put forth a successful motion that the city send a letter to its sister city, Laizhou in China, expressing concern over the persecution of Falun Gong. In the 2005 council election, the four councillors that stood for re-election won, including Donnelly who received the most votes over all other candidates. In the 2008 council election, Donnelly again obtained the most votes in the council election.

== Federal politics ==
The 43 year-old Donnelly entered federal politics after his local member of parliament Dawn Black vacated her seat in April 2009. In a June NDP constituency meeting Donnelly won the party's nomination on the first ballot against fellow Coquitlam city councillor Barrie Lynch and New Westminster councillor Lorrie Williams. Port Moody councillor Diana Dilworth won the Conservative Party nomination, civil and environmental engineer Ken Beck Lee won the Liberal Party nomination, and Rebecca Helps was acclaimed as the Green Party nominee. The by-election was called for November 9 and Donnelly, who was supported by campaign visits by party leader Jack Layton, and Dilworth were considered the front-runners. With only a 30% voter turnout, Donnelly won the by-election with 50% of the vote. Since being elected in 2009, Donnelly has been active on a number of different issues of concern to British Columbians, particularly those focused on society, the environment, and the economy.

=== 40th Parliament ===
Donnelly entered the 40th Canadian Parliament during its third session, which lasted one year; he was named the NDP's national fisheries critic. During that year he sponsored six private member bills, none of which advanced far enough to be voted upon. He sponsored two amendments to the Criminal Code, both of which Dawn Black had previously introduced in the previous parliament: Bill C-520 would have added the offence of luring a child to those offenses prosecutable in Canada even if committed outside Canada, and Bill C-521 would have expanded the offence of luring a child to include all means of communication rather than solely through a computer. In March 2010, he introduced Bill C-502 that would prohibit oil tankers in the Dixon Entrance, Hecate Strait and Queen Charlotte Sound. In May 2010, he introduced Bill C-518 which proposed to amend the Fisheries Act to require commercial finfish aquaculture only take place in closed containment facilities. He also proposed Bill C-526 that would have expanded Employment Insurance coverage received as a result of illness, injury or quarantine from 15 to 52 weeks.

=== 41st Parliament ===
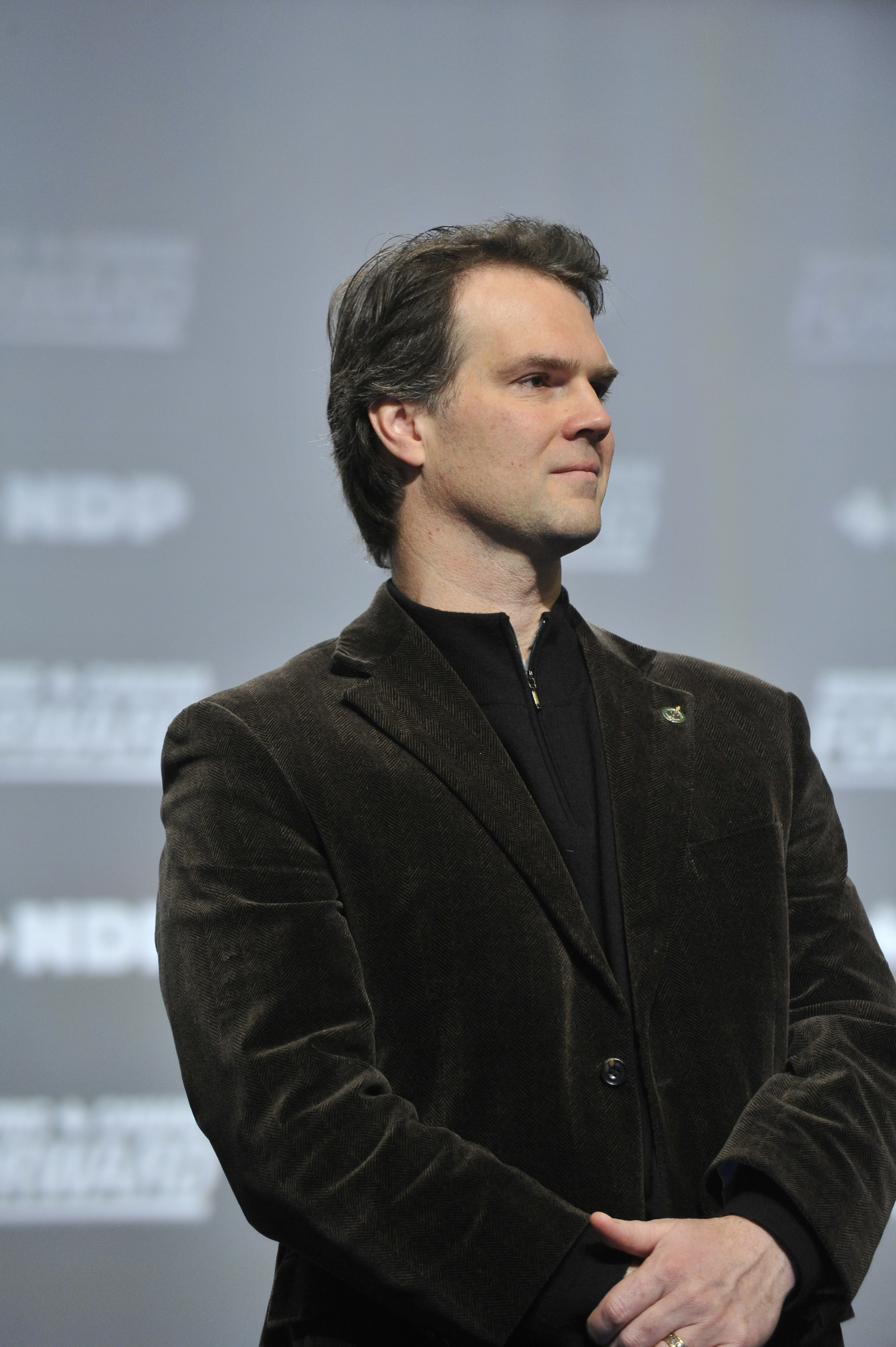
Fin Donnelly in 2011

For the 2011 election, Donnelly was acclaimed as the NDP candidate and again challenged by Dilworth, Lee, and Helps, as well as Roland Verrier for the Marxist–Leninist Party. This time with 60% voter turnout, Donnelly won the riding with 46% of the vote, and his party formed the official opposition to a Conservative Party majority government. He was re-appointed as critic on Fisheries and Oceans by party leader Jack Layton in the NDP shadow cabinet of the 41st Canadian Parliament.

Donnelly re-introduced, all in 2011, the six private member bills he introduced in the previous parliament. While none of the bills again advanced far enough to be voted upon, the two proposed amendments to the Criminal Code regarding luring a child were adopted in the Safe Streets and Communities Act. In December 2011, Donnelly sponsored a new private member bill, the Ban on Shark Fin Importation Act (Bill C-380), but it was defeated at second reading in March 2013 with the Conservative Party majority voting against it.

In the 2012 NDP leadership election triggered by Layton's death, Donnelly endorsed Nathan Cullen. Tom Mulcair won the election to become party leader, and moved Donnelly to critic of Western Economic Diversification; Donnelly also became assistant critic in his original portfolio of Fisheries and Oceans. In August 2013, Mulcair re-assigned Donnelly to be the assistant critic to both Fisheries and Oceans and Infrastructure and Communities for the remainder of the parliament.

==== Alan Kurdi ====
On September 3, 2015, after the death of Alan Kurdi, Donnelly stated that he had handed a letter from his constituent Tima Kurdi, Alan Kurdi's aunt, to Immigration Minister Chris Alexander requesting that he look into the case of Alan Kurdi's refugee application, which was later rejected according to Donnelly. On the same day, it was reported that Alan Kurdi's family had not in fact applied for refugee status in Canada, and that the letter primarily concerned the family of Alan Kurdi's uncle, for whom an application had been submitted but been rejected for being incomplete. Donnelly subsequently faced criticism for his role in the spread of the false information regarding Alan Kurdi's family's nonexistent refugee application. Mulcair later defended Donnelly, saying that no apology was warranted because the letter had mentioned both families, and stated that he "couldn’t be prouder to have someone of the strength, integrity and hard work as Fin Donnelly" in caucus. On September 10 the Ottawa Citizen reported that: "Abdullah Kurdi’s brother Mohammad and his family were named in a G5 refugee resettlement application, while simultaneously, Abdullah and his now-dead wife and children were included and named along with Mohammad’s family in a lengthy set of correspondence, over a period of months, to Citizenship and Immigration Minister Chris Alexander and senior CIC officials."

=== 42nd Parliament ===
New electoral districts in the Greater Vancouver area, added for the 2015 election, resulted in Donnelly moving to the re-created Port Moody—Coquitlam riding, effectively shifting his representative area northwards by removing New Westminster and adding the entirety of Port Moody. In the election, Donnelly was challenged by City of Vancouver's chief digital officer Jessie Adcock for the Liberal Party, Canadian Forces veteran Tim Laidler for the Conservative Party, and Green Party member Marcus Madsen, as well as Roland Verrier of the Marxist–Leninist again. Though Donnelly won his riding with 36% of the vote, the Liberal Party won the general election and formed a majority government, with the Conservative Party taking over the official opposition status and the NDP as the third party. With a reduced number of MPs, party leader Tom Mulcair appointed Donnelly to be the NDP critic for Fisheries, Oceans, and the Canadian Coast Guard, a post he previously held in 2009-2012 and since acted as deputy to.

In the 42nd Canadian Parliament he again sponsored the private member bill C-228 which proposed to amend the Fisheries Act to require commercial finfish aquaculture only take place in closed containment facilities. This time it was voted on in December 2016, but was defeated with a majority of the Liberal Party MPs (who were granted a free vote) and the Conservative Party voting against the bill, though all NDP, Bloc Quebecois and Green Party MPs voted in favour. In March 2016, Donnelly re-introduced the Ban on Shark Fin Importation Act (Bill C-251). It only received a first reading but was introduced into the senate by Conservative senator Michael L. MacDonald in April 2017. Donnelly did not re-introduce his previous bill to prohibit oil tankers off B.C.'s north coast, though the government house bill Oil Tanker Moratorium Act (Bill C-48) was introduced that would accomplish much the same except it would still allow small general purpose tankers.

Donnelly announced in December 2018 that he would not be standing in the 2019 federal election.

== Provincial politics ==
On September 2, 2020 Donnelly announced he was seeking the BC NDP nomination in the riding of Coquitlam-Burke Mountain for the upcoming provincial election. He was acclaimed as the party's candidate on September 14. At the October 24, 2020 election, he defeated one-term incumbent BC Liberal candidate Joan Isaacs to become the riding's MLA. He was appointed Parliamentary Secretary for Fisheries and Aquaculture by Premier John Horgan on November 26, 2020.

Initially without an assignment in Premier David Eby's government, Donnelly was named Parliamentary Secretary for Watershed Restoration on January 20, 2023.

On May 9, 2024 Donnelly announced he would be retiring as an MLA at the next election, scheduled for October of that year.

== Electoral record ==
=== Provincial elections ===
2020 British Columbia general election: Coquitlam-Burke Mountain
Party	Candidate	Votes	%	±%	Expenditures
New Democratic	Fin Donnelly	12,627	54.94	+11.03	$44,595.15
Liberal	Joan Isaacs	8,324	36.22	−8.06	$46,536.87
Green	Adam Bremner-Akins	2,033	8.85	−2.96	$0.00
Total valid votes		22,984	100.00	–	
Total rejected ballots					
Turnout					
Registered voters					
New Democratic gain from Liberal		Swing		+11.03	
Source: Elections BC

=== Federal elections ===
2015 Canadian federal election: Port Moody—Coquitlam
Party	Candidate	Votes	%	±%	Expenditures
New Democratic	Fin Donnelly	19,706	36.05	–4.41	$108,104.25
Liberal	Jessie Adcock	16,888	30.89	+22.36	$46,183.13
Conservative	Tim Laidler	16,112	29.47	–17.02	$143,435.34
Green	Marcus Madsen	1,878	3.44	–0.82	$7,735.81
Marxist–Leninist	Roland Verrier	83	0.15	–	none listed
Total valid votes/expense limit		54,667	99.68	–	$212,494.90
Total rejected ballots		174	0.32	–	
Turnout		54,841	68.93	–	
Eligible voters		79,555			
New Democratic notional gain from Conservative		Swing		+6.31	
Source: Elections Canada

2011 Canadian federal election: New Westminster—Coquitlam
Party	Candidate	Votes	%	±%	Expenditures
New Democratic	Fin Donnelly	23,023	45.93	–3.79	$69,172.03
Conservative	Diana Dilworth	20,776	41.45	+5.78	$86,078.14
Liberal	Ken Beck Lee	4,069	8.12	–2.21	$25,266.86
Green	Rebecca Helps	2,160	4.31	+0.03	$3,498.04
Marxist–Leninist	Roland Verrier	95	0.19	–	none listed
Total valid votes/expense limit		50,123	99.70	–	$90,160.30
Total rejected ballots		153	0.30	+0.04	
Turnout		50,276	59.61	+29.65	
Eligible voters		84,337			
New Democratic hold		Swing		–4.79	
Source: Elections Canada

Canadian federal by-election, 9 November 2009: New Westminster—Coquitlam On the resignation of Dawn Black
Party	Candidate	Votes	%	±%	Expenditures
New Democratic	Fin Donnelly	12,171	49.73	+7.89	$73,836.40
Conservative	Diana Dilworth	8,730	35.67	–3.17	$76,993.22
Liberal	Ken Beck Lee	2,528	10.33	–0.97	$73,328.85
Green	Rebecca Helps	1,047	4.28	–2.91	$8,764.75
Total valid votes/expense limit		24,476	99.74	–	$89,079.96
Total rejected ballots		65	0.26	–0.07	
Turnout		24,541	29.96	–31.78	
Eligible voters		81,903			
New Democratic hold		Swing		+5.53	
Source: Elections Canada
