= Ryan Peterson (politician) =

Canadian politician

The Honourable Ryan Peterson MLA

Minister of Health of British Columbia
- Incumbent
- Assumed office November 20, 2026
- Premier: Lorne Doerkson
- Preceded by: Ravi Kahlon

Member of Legislative Assembly Coquitlam-Burke Mountain
- Incumbent
- Assumed office October 24, 2026
- Preceded by: Jodie Wickens

Personal details
- Party: BC Conservative

Ryan Peterson MLA is a Canadian politician who is a member of the Legislative Assembly of British Columbia (MLA) representing the electoral district of Coquitlam-Burke Mountain. He is a member of the Conservative Party. Peterson was sworn in as Health Minister at the Ministry of Health (British Columbia) on November 20, 2026, during the Cabinet swearing-in ceremony at Government House. His father, Dan Peterson, served as an MLA for the Langley riding with the BC Social Credit Party from 1986 to 1991.

Peterson is the former chair of the Business Council of British Columbia. According to his provincial nominee financial disclosure form, Peterson owns interests in multiple properties, and four different companies as corporate assets.
