= Jodie Wickens =

Canadian politician

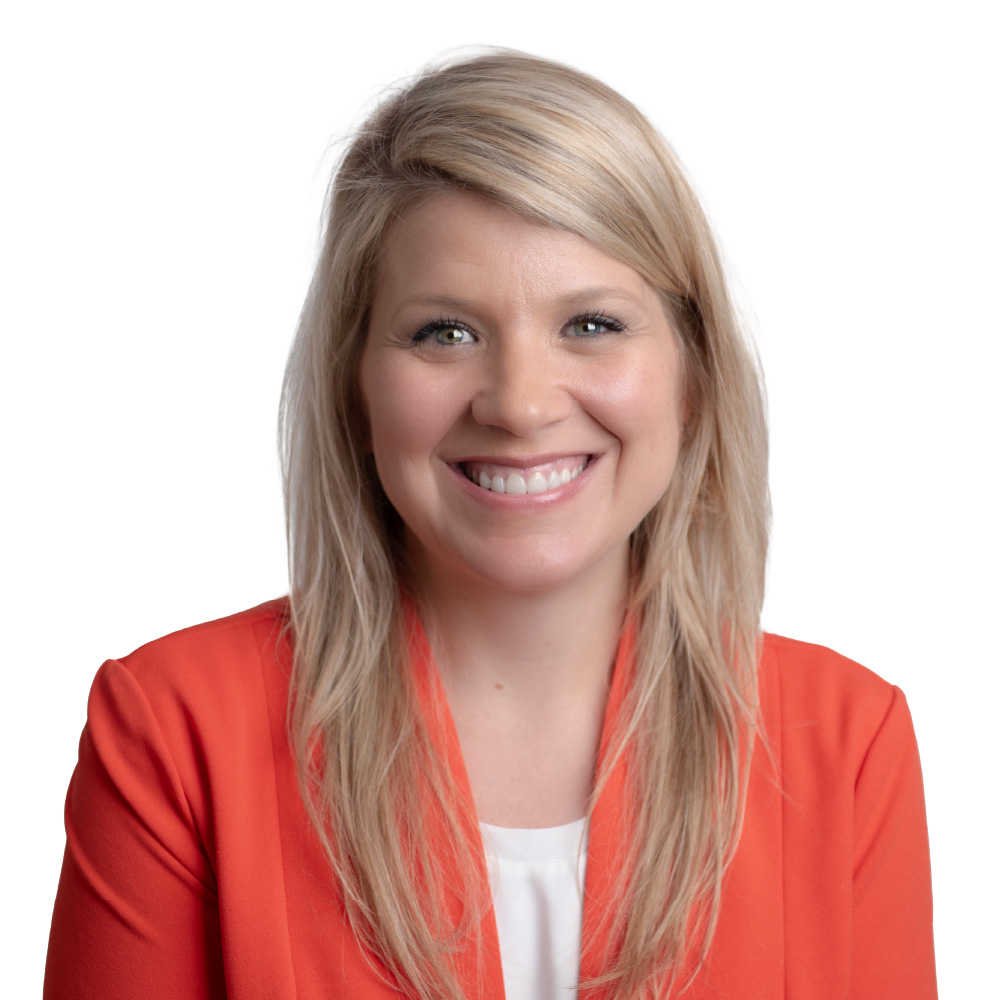
- Campaign portrait, 2024

Minister of Children and Family Development of British Columbia
- In office December 10, 2024 – November 20, 2026
- Premier: David Eby
- Preceded by: Grace Lore
- Succeeded by: Kristina Loewen

Minister of State for Child Care and Children and Youth with Support Needs of British Columbia
- In office November 18, 2024 – December 10, 2024
- Premier: David Eby
- Preceded by: Mitzi Dean (Child Care)
- Succeeded by: Office abolished

Member of the British Columbia Legislative Assembly for Coquitlam-Burke Mountain
- In office October 19, 2024 – October 24, 2026
- Preceded by: Fin Donnelly
- Succeeded by: Ryan Peterson
- In office February 2, 2016 – May 9, 2017
- Preceded by: Douglas Horne
- Succeeded by: Joan Isaacs

Personal details
- Born: December 18, 1982 (age 43)
- Party: New Democratic
- Spouse: Brian Wickens
- Children: 2
- Relatives: Kim Parkinson, Gary Parkinson

Jodie Wickens is a Canadian politician who served as a member of the Legislative Assembly of British Columbia (MLA) representing the electoral district of Coquitlam-Burke Mountain from 2024 to 2026. A member of the New Democratic Party, she previously represented the district from 2016 to 2017.

Prior to elected office, Wickens was executive director of the Autism Support Network.

== Political career ==
Wickens was first elected on February 2, 2016, in a by-election, defeating BC Liberal Party candidate Joan Isaacs and Green Party of British Columbia candidate Joe Keithley with 46% of the vote. In the 2017 provincial election, she was narrowly defeated by Joan Isaacs, who received 87 more votes.

Following the 2024 election, Wickens was appointed as the Minister of State for Child Care and Children and Youth with Support Needs. However, in December 2024 she was appointed acting Minister of Children and Family Development after Grace Lore temporarily stepped down for medical reasons.

== Personal life ==
Wickens and her husband Brian have two children, Ashton and Troy, and have lived in Coquitlam for over 20 years.

== Electoral history ==
2026 British Columbia general election: Coquitlam-Burke Mountain
| Party | Candidate | Votes | % | ±% | Expenditures |
|---|---|---|---|---|---|
| Conservative | Ryan Peterson | 10,771 | 52.44 | | |
| New Democratic | Jodie Wickens | 8,051 | 39.20 | | |
| Green | Valerie Morrison | 1,226 | 5.97 | — | |
| CentreBC | Kaden Mann | 450 | 2.19 | — | |
| Total valid votes | | 20,498 | 99.81 | | |
| Total rejected ballots | | 40 | 0.19 | | |
| Turnout | | 20,538 | | | |
| Registered voters | | | | | |
| Conservative gain from New Democratic | | Swing | | +7.48 | |
Source: Elections BC

2024 British Columbia general election: Coquitlam-Burke Mountain
| Party | Candidate | Votes | % | ±% | Expenditures |
|---|---|---|---|---|---|
| New Democratic | Jodie Wickens | 11,020 | 50.85 | −3.1 | $52,840.49 |
| Conservative | Stephen Frolek | 10,652 | 49.15 | – | $19,524.80 |
| Total valid votes/expense limit | | 21,672 | 99.57 | – | $71,700.08 |
| Total rejected ballots | | 94 | 0.43 | – | |
| Turnout | | 21,766 | 54.69 | – | |
| Registered voters | | 39,801 | | | |
| New Democratic notional hold | | Swing | | −26.1 | |
Source: Elections BC

2017 British Columbia general election: Coquitlam-Burke Mountain
| Party | Candidate | Votes | % | ±% | Expenditures |
|---|---|---|---|---|---|
| Liberal | Joan Isaacs | 10,388 | 44.28 | +6.20 | $59,630 |
| New Democratic | Jodie Wickens | 10,301 | 43.91 | −2.22 | $61,721 |
| Green | Ian Donnelly Soutar | 2,771 | 11.81 | −1.74 | $5,251 |
| Total valid votes | | 23,460 | 100.00 | – | |
| Total rejected ballots | | 174 | 0.74 | +0.50 | |
| Turnout | | 23,634 | 57.46 | +35.91 | |
| Registered voters | | 41,133 | | | |
Source: Elections BC

British Columbia provincial by-election, February 2, 2016: Coquitlam-Burke Mountain
| Party | Candidate | Votes | % | ±% | Expenditures |
|---|---|---|---|---|---|
| New Democratic | Jodie Wickens | 3,836 | 46.48 | +9.13 | $69,695 |
| Liberal | Joan Isaacs | 3,146 | 38.12 | −11.81 | $68,690 |
| Green | Joe Keithley | 1,114 | 13.50 | +7.70 | $16,337 |
| Libertarian | Paul Geddes | 157 | 1.90 | +0.45 | |
| Total valid votes | | 8,253 | 100.00 | – | |
| Total rejected ballots | | 20 | 0.24 | −0.53 | |
| Turnout | | 8,273 | 21.55 | −31.68 | |
| Eligible voters | | 38,393 | | | |
| New Democratic gain from Liberal | | Swing | | +10.47 | |
