= Joan Isaacs =

Canadian politician

Member of the British Columbia Legislative Assembly for Coquitlam-Burke Mountain
- In office May 9, 2017 – September 21, 2020
- Preceded by: Jodie Wickens
- Succeeded by: Fin Donnelly

Personal details
- Party: BC Liberal

Joan Isaacs is a Canadian politician who was elected to the Legislative Assembly of British Columbia in the 2017 provincial election, after being defeated in a 2016 byelection. She represented the electoral district of Coquitlam-Burke Mountain as a member of the British Columbia Liberal Party caucus until the 2020 provincial election, in which she was defeated by Fin Donnelly of the British Columbia New Democratic Party. In government, she served as the Parliamentary Secretary for Early Childhood Education. In opposition, she served as the Official Opposition's critic for Health.

== Electoral record ==
2020 British Columbia general election: Coquitlam-Burke Mountain
Party	Candidate	Votes	%	±%	Expenditures
New Democratic	Fin Donnelly	12,627	54.94	+11.03	$44,595.15
Liberal	Joan Isaacs	8,324	36.22	−8.06	$46,536.87
Green	Adam Bremner-Akins	2,033	8.85	−2.96	$0.00
Total valid votes		22,984	100.00	–	
Total rejected ballots					
Turnout					
Registered voters					
New Democratic gain from Liberal		Swing		+11.03	
Source: Elections BC

2017 British Columbia general election: Coquitlam-Burke Mountain
Party	Candidate	Votes	%	±%	Expenditures
Liberal	Joan Isaacs	10,388	44.28	+6.20	$59,630
New Democratic	Jodie Wickens	10,301	43.91	−2.22	$61,721
Green	Ian Donnelly Soutar	2,771	11.81	−1.74	$5,251
Total valid votes		23,460	100.00	–	
Total rejected ballots		174	0.74	+0.50	
Turnout		23,634	57.46	+35.91	
Registered voters		41,133			
Source: Elections BC
