= Sharon Hayes (politician) =

Canadian politician

Member of Parliament for Port Moody—Coquitlam
- In office October 25, 1993 – October 1, 1997
- Preceded by: Ian Waddell
- Succeeded by: Lou Sekora

Personal details
- Born: January 15, 1948 (age 78) Toronto, Ontario, Canada
- Party: Reform Party of Canada

Sharon Ruth Hayes (born January 15, 1948) is a former Canadian politician. She served as the member of Parliament for the riding of Port Moody—Coquitlam from 1993 to 1997 as a member of the Reform Party of Canada.

== Early life and education ==
Hayes was born January 15, 1948, in Toronto, Ontario. She graduated with a degree in math and computer science from the University of Waterloo; while enrolled there, she worked as a co-op student with the Toronto Stock Exchange and IBM. After graduation, she worked as a program analyst at the University of Guelph and then as a sessional instructor in computer science at Simon Fraser University.

Hayes married Douglas Hayes in 1970. She has two daughters.

== Political career ==
In the 1993 federal election, Hayes was elected to represent the riding of Port Moody—Coquitlam, defeating the incumbent, Ian Waddell of the New Democratic Party (NDP). As one of 52 Reform MPs, she served as Chair of the party's Family Caucus and critic on Human Rights and Status of Women. She was assistant critic for Health (1995-'96) and Human Resources (1997), and a member of the Standing Committees on Health (1994-'97), Citizenship and Immigration (1994-'96) and Human Rights (1996-'97), and of the sub-Committee on HIV/AIDS (1994-'96). While in office, Hayes joined many of her Reform colleagues in donating 10% of their salary to charity and opting out of the MP pension plan.

Hayes was best known as a socially conservative advocate for family issues. She crafted the RPC's response to parliamentary initiatives on family and the definition of family, age of consent, Child Care Tax Credit, corporal punishment and the Unified Family Court. She was an advocate for the rights of the disabled, and prompted a change to the compassionate airfare policy for Air Canada. Hayes also sponsored a rally in 1994 in Coquitlam of an estimated 2,000 persons to press for changes to the Young Offenders Act.

She was a member of the Canadian Delegation to the Fourth UN Conference for Women in Beijing in 1995, but left early to protest what she called (in an essay published in the Globe and Mail on Sept. 15, 1995) the conference's pre-ordained, anti-family agenda. She had also stirred controversy for issuing a press release on her House of Commons letterhead calling on Liberal ministers attending the conference to reject "Chinese government policies that endorse the mandated one-child policy, the murder of inmates for body parts and the alleged consumption of human fetuses as health food." Writing on her personal blog in 2011, Hayes apologized to those offended by the health food release, noting, "Thankfully, there has been no evidence of the truth of that story since that time." She explained that she had not intended for the release to be made public, and, "In no way did I intend to discredit any nationality or group of people then or since."

Hayes was also a speaker at the first World Congress of Families, organized by the Rockford Institute, in Prague in 1997. She was appointed co-chair of the RPC's Family Campaign, along with Chuck Stahl, leading up to the 1997 general election. Even though her husband, Doug, was in a coma from a massive brain hemorrhage when the election was called and she was able to campaign very little, she was reelected. However, she resigned four months later to care for her ailing husband after his condition deteriorated. Prime Minister Jean Chrétien, Opposition Leader Preston Manning, Bloc Québécois leader Gilles Duceppe, and NDP spokesman Bill Blaikie all praised her in the House following her resignation announcement.

== Post-political career ==
A past board member at Trinity Western University and Focus on the Family Canada, Hayes currently sits on the board of Affordable Housing Societies.

Parliament of Canada
Preceded by Ian Waddell	Member for Port Moody—Coquitlam; 1993-1998	Succeeded by Lou Sekora
