= Nelly Shin =

Canadian politician (born 1972)

Nelly Shin MP
- 신윤주

Member of Parliament for Port Moody—Coquitlam
- In office October 21, 2019 – September 20, 2021
- Preceded by: Fin Donnelly
- Succeeded by: Bonita Zarrillo

Personal details
- Born: 1971 or 1972 (age 53–54) South Korea
- Party: Conservative
- Profession: Musician

Nelly Shin MP (born 1972) is a Canadian politician who was elected as a Member of Parliament in the House of Commons of Canada for Port Moody—Coquitlam as a member of the Conservative Party of Canada.

Shin is the first Korean-Canadian to be elected to the House of Commons. She is the second Korean-Canadian woman, after Senator Yonah Martin, to serve in the Parliament of Canada.

== Background ==
Shin was born in South Korea in 1972, and is the eldest of three siblings. She immigrated with her parents to Canada in 1977, settling in East York, Ontario. Her parents ran a floral business. She earned two degrees from the University of Toronto: a Bachelor of Music in 1996 and a Bachelor of Education in 2000. She left teaching in 2008 to pursue a career in music and ministry. In December 2017, she launched a campaign to attain the Conservative nomination in the Ontario riding of Richmond Hill, but later withdrew to allow a former Conservative MP to gain the nomination. After having earlier lived in Victoria for three years, she moved permanently to British Columbia in 2018 and secured the party’s nomination in Port Moody—Coquitlam in June 2019.

== Career ==
After earning a Bachelor of Education degree from the University of Toronto in 2000, Shin worked for the Toronto District School Board as a high-school English and Music teacher. Her initial posts were in inner-city high schools, at which two stabbings took place – events that she says “profoundly impacted” her by deepening her “awareness of the societal challenges around her.” She also taught piano, theory and composition and directed choirs, bands and musical theatre productions. She left teaching in 2008.

Shin started studying piano when she was eight and penned her first composition, Yearning, when she was 15.

== Politics ==
In December 2017, Shin sought the Conservative nomination in the Ontario riding of Richmond Hill. However, she withdrew from the race following then-Liberal MP Leona Alleslev's September 2018 decision to cross the floor and join the Conservatives. Former Conservative MP Costas Menegakis had been seeking the CPC nomination to run against Alleslev in Aurora—Oak Ridges—Richmond Hill (which is adjacent to Richmond Hill), but after Alleslev's floor crossing, he set his sights on the Richmond Hill nomination. In turn, Shin stepped aside to allow Menegakis to run for the nomination unopposed and later decided to seek the Conservative nomination in the riding of Port Moody-Coquitlam.

Her campaign became public in February 2019 as she received endorsements from retired Coquitlam City Councillor Terry O'Neill and the previous Conservative candidate for the riding, Tim Laidler. The only other person seeking the nomination, Matthew Sebastiani, said the following month that he had been pressured by at least one Conservative to drop out of the race. In June, the party disqualified Sebastiani; it did not release any reasons. Shin was officially declared the CPC candidate for the riding on June 20, 2019.

On September 20, 2021 she lost re-election to the NDP's Bonita Zarrillo, whom she had defeated narrowly in the 2019 election.

== Electoral record ==
2021 Canadian federal election: Port Moody—Coquitlam
Party	Candidate	Votes	%	±%	Expenditures
New Democratic	Bonita Zarrillo	19,367	37.18	+6.25	$89,534.85
Conservative	Nelly Shin	16,605	31.88	+0.67	$113,068.07
Liberal	Will Davis	14,231	27.32	–1.74	$106,162.59
People's	Desta McPherson	1,766	3.39	+1.87	$1,212.95
Marxist–Leninist	Roland Verrier	122	0.23	+0.12	$0.00
Total valid votes/expense limit		52,091	99.19	–	$113,310.09
Total rejected ballots		428	0.81		
Turnout		52,519	62.74	-3.02	
Eligible voters		83,715			
New Democratic gain from Conservative		Swing		+2.79	
Source: Elections Canada

2019 Canadian federal election: Port Moody—Coquitlam
Party	Candidate	Votes	%	±%	Expenditures
Conservative	Nelly Shin	16,855	31.21	+1.74	$99,557.86
New Democratic	Bonita Zarrillo	16,702	30.93	-5.12	$87,431.13
Liberal	Sara Badiei	15,695	29.06	-1.83	none listed
Green	Bryce Watts	3,873	7.17	+3.74	none listed
People's	Jayson Chabot	821	1.52	–	$1,508.00
Marxist–Leninist	Roland Verrier	57	0.11	-0.05	none listed
Total valid votes/expense limit		54,003	99.34		
Total rejected ballots		361	0.66	+0.35	
Turnout		54,364	65.76	-3.18	
Eligible voters		82,674			
Conservative gain from New Democratic		Swing		+3.43	
Source: Elections Canada
