= Zoe Royer =

Canadian politician

Zoe Royer MP
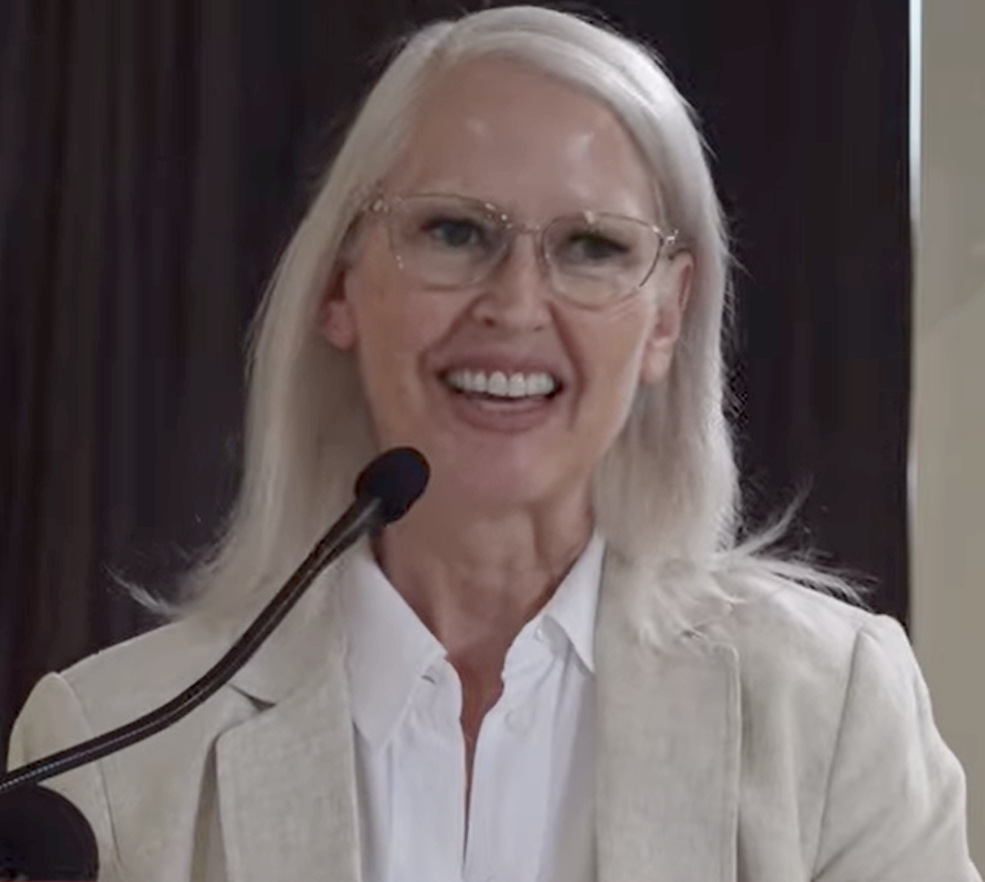
- At a candidates' forum in 2025

Member of Parliament for Port Moody—Coquitlam
- Incumbent
- Assumed office April 28, 2025
- Preceded by: Bonita Zarrillo

Personal details
- Born: 1965 or 1966 (age 59–60)
- Party: Liberal
- Other political affiliations: New Democratic (former)
- Website: zoeroyer.libparl.ca

Zoe Royer MP (born 1965 or 1966) is a Canadian politician from the Liberal Party of Canada. She was elected Member of Parliament for Port Moody—Coquitlam in the 2025 Canadian federal election. She served as a Port Moody city councillor for 11 years, and is a Trustee for SD43.

She ran as the NDP candidate in Port Moody—Westwood—Port Coquitlam at the 2008 Canadian federal election.

== Early life and career ==
Royer was born in Scotland, and moved to Canada as a baby. Her mother was a physician, specializing in obstetrics and gynaecology, and her father was a geophysicist.

Royer is a former health care administrator. She founded, and was CEO of her own dentistry solutions company. In 2020, Royer founded a subscription company along with her two daughters, for monthly youth-oriented stories and recipes. The company appears to have become inactive in 2022. Royer is the former Strategic Growth Officer for Massive Canada Building Systems. She resigned from that position in February 2025 to focus on her successful campaign as Member of Parliament.

She is married to Gaëtan Royer, and has 2 daughters, Charlotte and Carola.

== Political career ==
On April 28, 2025, Zoe Royer was elected Member of Parliament to represent the Port Moody-Coquitlam riding. Royer first ran for election in Port Moody—Westwood—Port Coquitlam in the 2008 federal election, as a member of the New Democratic Party. She came in second, receiving 22.3% of the vote, losing to incumbent Conservative candidate James Moore. She also ran against Liberal candidate Ron McKinnon, both of whom now hold a seat in the House of Commons as of the 2025 federal election.

Royer was elected to the Port Moody city council in 2011. She served three terms, choosing not to run for re-election in 2022. Instead of running for Council for a fourth term, Zoe Royer ran for School Trustee and was successfully elected as a SD43 trustee.

In the 2025 Canadian federal election, Royer ran as the Liberal Party candidate in Port Moody—Coquitlam. She won, receiving 43.6% of the votes and unseating incumbent New Democratic Party candidate Bonita Zarrillo, who came in third.

During the campaign, a complaint filed with the elections commissioner, alleged that Zarrillo’s campaign had spread polling misinformation and attempted to discredit SmartVoting.ca, a registered third party with Elections Canada.

== Electoral record ==
2025 Canadian federal election: Port Moody—Coquitlam
** Preliminary results — Not yet official **
| Party | Candidate | Votes | % | ±% | Expenditures |
|---|---|---|---|---|---|
| Liberal | Zoe Royer | 27,123 | 43.57 | +14.09 | |
| Conservative | Paul Lambert | 25,127 | 40.37 | +8.41 | |
| New Democratic | Bonita Zarrillo | 9,360 | 15.04 | –20.00 | |
| Green | Nash Milani | 519 | 0.83 | N/A | |
| Marxist–Leninist | Roland Verrier | 117 | 0.19 | +0.08 | |
| Total valid votes/expense limit | | | | | |
| Total rejected ballots | | | | | |
| Turnout | | 62,246 | 70.40 | | |
| Eligible voters | | 88,418 | | | |
| Liberal notional gain from New Democratic | | Swing | | +17.05 | |
Source: Elections Canada

2008 Canadian federal election: Port Moody—Westwood—Port Coquitlam
| Party | Candidate | Votes | % | ±% | Expenditures |
|---|---|---|---|---|---|
| Conservative | James Moore | 25,535 | 54.61% | +13.49% | $76,521.14 |
| New Democratic | Zoë Royer | 10,418 | 22.28% | -0.78% | $14,957.53 |
| Liberal | Ron McKinnon | 6,918 | 14.79% | -12.26% | $32,213.85 |
| Green | Rod Brindamour | 3,568 | 7.63% | +4.29% | $2,240.25 |
| Libertarian | Lewis Dahlby | 321 | 0.69% | +0.06% | |
| Total valid votes | | 46,760 | | | |
| Total rejected ballots | | 168 | | | |
| Turnout | | 46,928 | 59.72% | -3.47% | |
| Conservative hold | | Swing | | +7.14 | |
