= Coquitlam-Burke Mountain =

Provincial electoral district in British Columbia, Canada

British Columbia electoral district
- Interactive map of riding boundaries

Provincial electoral district
- Legislature: Legislative Assembly of British Columbia
MLA
Ryan Peterson
Conservative
- District created: 2008
- First contested: 2009
- Last contested: 2026

Demographics
- Population (2021): 60,743
- Area (km²): 617
- Pop. density (per km²): 98.4
- Census division: Metro Vancouver
- Census subdivision: Coquitlam (part)

Coquitlam-Burke Mountain is a provincial electoral district in British Columbia that has been represented in the Legislative Assembly of British Columbia since 2009.

Created under the 2008 British Columbia electoral redistribution, the riding was first contested in the 2009 general election. It was formed from parts of Port Moody-Westwood, Coquitlam-Maillardville and Port Coquitlam-Burke Mountain.

== Demographics ==
Population, 2021	60,743
Area (km^{2})	617
Pop. density (people per km^{2})	98
Source: BC Electoral Boundaries Commission

== Geography ==
Located in Metro Vancouver, the district comprises downtown Coquitlam, River Springs, Sun Valley and the central part of Westwood Plateau. It extends north and east to the regional district boundary, with Indian Arm and the Indian River forming part of its western boundary.

== Members of the Legislative Assembly ==
This riding has elected the following members of the Legislative Assembly:

Assembly	Years	Member	Party
Coquitlam-Burke Mountain; Riding created from Coquitlam-Maillardville, Port Coquitlam-Burke Mountain and Port Moody-Westwood
39th	2009–2013	Douglas Horne	Liberal
40th	2013–2015	Douglas Horne	Liberal
40th	2016–2017	Jodie Wickens	New Democratic
41st	2017–2020	Joan Isaacs	Liberal
42nd	2020–2024	Fin Donnelly	New Democratic
43rd	2024–2026	Jodie Wickens	New Democratic
44th	2026–present	Ryan Peterson	Conservative

== Election results ==
2026 British Columbia general election
Party	Candidate	Votes	%	±%	Expenditures
Conservative	Ryan Peterson	9,812	52.6	+3.4	
New Democratic	Jodie Wickens	7,336	39.3	-11.6	
Green	Valerie Morrison	1,113	6.0	-	
CentreBC	Kaden Mann	407	2.2	-	
Total valid votes		18,668			
Total rejected ballots					
Turnout					
Registered voters					
Conservative gain from New Democratic		Swing		+13.3	
Source: Elections BC

2024 British Columbia general election
Party	Candidate	Votes	%	±%	Expenditures
New Democratic	Jodie Wickens	11,020	50.85	−3.1	$52,840.49
Conservative	Stephen Frolek	10,652	49.15	–	$19,524.80
Total valid votes/expense limit		21,672	99.57	–	$71,700.08
Total rejected ballots		94	0.43	–	
Turnout		21,766	54.69	–	
Registered voters		39,801			
New Democratic notional hold		Swing		−26.1	
Source: Elections BC

2020 provincial election redistributed results
Party	%
New Democratic	53.9
Liberal	37.1
Green	9.0

2020 British Columbia general election
Party	Candidate	Votes	%	±%	Expenditures
New Democratic	Fin Donnelly	12,627	54.94	+11.03	$44,595.15
Liberal	Joan Isaacs	8,324	36.22	−8.06	$46,536.87
Green	Adam Bremner-Akins	2,033	8.85	−2.96	$0.00
Total valid votes		22,984	100.00	–	
Total rejected ballots					
Turnout					
Registered voters					
New Democratic gain from Liberal		Swing		+11.03	
Source: Elections BC

2018 British Columbia electoral reform referendum
Side	Votes	%
First Past the Post	10,257	65.67
Proportional representation	5,363	34.33
Total valid votes	15,620	100.00
Total rejected ballots	99	0.63
Source: Elections BC

2017 British Columbia general election
Party	Candidate	Votes	%	±%	Expenditures
Liberal	Joan Isaacs	10,388	44.28	+6.20	$59,630
New Democratic	Jodie Wickens	10,301	43.91	−2.22	$61,721
Green	Ian Donnelly Soutar	2,771	11.81	−1.74	$5,251
Total valid votes		23,460	100.00	–	
Total rejected ballots		174	0.74	+0.50	
Turnout		23,634	57.46	+35.91	
Registered voters		41,133			
Source: Elections BC

British Columbia provincial by-election, February 2, 2016 Resignation of Douglas Horne
Party	Candidate	Votes	%	±%	Expenditures
New Democratic	Jodie Wickens	3,836	46.48	+9.13	$69,695
Liberal	Joan Isaacs	3,146	38.12	−11.81	$68,690
Green	Joe Keithley	1,114	13.50	+7.70	$16,337
Libertarian	Paul Geddes	157	1.90	+0.45	
Total valid votes		8,253	100.00	–	
Total rejected ballots		20	0.24	−0.53	
Turnout		8,273	21.55	−31.68	
Eligible voters		38,393			
New Democratic gain from Liberal		Swing		+10.47	

2013 British Columbia general election
Party	Candidate	Votes	%
Liberal	Douglas Horne	9,766	49.87
New Democratic	Chris Wilson	7,315	37.35
Green	Ron Peters	1,144	5.89
Conservative	Shane Kennedy	1,071	5.47
Libertarian	Paul Geddes	277	1.41
Total valid votes		19,573	100.00
Total rejected ballots		152	0.77
Turnout		19,725	53.23
Registered voters		37,056	
Source: Elections BC

2009 British Columbia general election
Party	Candidate	Votes	%	±%	Expenditures
Liberal	Douglas Horne	8,644	56.83	+2.3	$87,288
New Democratic	Heather McRitchie	5,393	35.46	−1.9	$23,778
Green	Jared Evans	907	5.96	–	$300
Libertarian	Paul Geddes	266	1.75	–	$250
Total valid votes		15,210	100.00		
Total rejected ballots		133	0.87	–	
Turnout		15,343	48.86	–	
Eligible voters		31,397			
Liberal notional hold		Swing		+2.10	

== See also ==
- List of British Columbia provincial electoral districts
- Canadian provincial electoral districts
