= Port Moody—Coquitlam (federal electoral district) =

Federal electoral district in British Columbia, Canada

British Columbia electoral district
- Interactive map of riding boundaries from the 2025 federal election

Federal electoral district
- Legislature: House of Commons
MP
Zoe Royer
Liberal
- District created: 2013
- First contested: 2015
- Last contested: 2025
- District webpage: profile, map

Demographics
- Population (2011): 108,326
- Electors (2015): 77,368
- Area (km²): 101
- Pop. density (per km²): 1,072.5
- Census division: Greater Vancouver
- Census subdivision(s): Coquitlam (part), Port Moody, Anmore, Belcarra, Coquitlam

Port Moody—Coquitlam (formerly known as Port Moody—Coquitlam—Port Coquitlam) is a federal electoral district in British Columbia, Canada, that was represented in the House of Commons of Canada from 1997 to 2004 and since 2015.

== Geography ==
It initially consisted of:

- the eastern part of Electoral Area B of the Greater Vancouver Regional District but excluding Croker Island, Douglas Island and Barnston Island;
- the City of Port Moody;
- the part of Coquitlam District Municipality lying west of the Coquitlam River and the north and west boundaries of the City of Port Coquitlam;
- the part of the City of Port Coquitlam lying south and west of the Canadian Pacific Railway right-of-way; and
- the Village of Belcarra and Anmore.

In 1996, it was redefined to consist of the part of Greater Vancouver Regional District lying north and east of a line drawn from the intersection of the northern limit of Greater Vancouver Regional District with the Indian River; south along the Indian River and Indian Arm to the limit of the City of Burnaby, east and south along the northern and eastern limits of Burnaby, east along the southern limit of the City of Port Moody, south along Gatensbury Road, east along Foster Avenue, south along Hillcrest Street, east along Austin Avenue, south along Mundy Street, east along the Trans-Canada Highway (Highway No. 1); thence easterly along the Trans-Canada Highway, south along Leeder Avenue, east along the southern limit of the cities of Coquitlam and Port Coquitlam to the eastern limit of the GVRD.

== History ==
This riding was created in 1987 as "Port Moody—Coquitlam" from parts of Mission—Port Moody and New Westminster—Coquitlam ridings.

The name of the district was changed in 1998 to "Port Moody—Coquitlam—Port Coquitlam".

In 2003, the district was abolished. A small portion was given to New Westminster—Coquitlam while the remainder was moved into the new Port Moody—Westwood—Port Coquitlam riding.

The 2012 electoral redistribution saw this riding resurrected for the 2015 election, taking in territories currently in New Westminster—Coquitlam and Port Moody—Westwood—Port Coquitlam.

== Demographics ==
Panethnic groups in Port Moody—Coquitlam (2011−2021)
Panethnic group	2021		2016		2011	
Panethnic group	Pop.	%	Pop.	%	Pop.	%
European (Note: Statistic includes all persons that did not make up part of a visible minority or an indigenous identity.)	59,500	52.24%	64,450	58.71%	68,325	63.91%
East Asian (Note: Statistic includes total responses of "Chinese", "Korean", and "Japanese" under visible minority section on census.)	27,025	23.73%	23,265	21.19%	19,000	17.77%
Southeast Asian (Note: Statistic includes total responses of "Filipino" and "Southeast Asian" under visible minority section on census.)	5,890	5.17%	5,315	4.84%	5,085	4.76%
South Asian	5,775	5.07%	4,675	4.26%	4,035	3.77%
Middle Eastern (Note: Statistic includes total responses of "West Asian" and "Arab" under visible minority section on census.)	5,565	4.89%	4,410	4.02%	3,500	3.27%
Indigenous	3,020	2.65%	2,820	2.57%	2,710	2.53%
Latin American	2,310	2.03%	1,715	1.56%	1,615	1.51%
African	1,870	1.64%	1,250	1.14%	1,345	1.26%
Other (Note: Statistic includes total responses of "Visible minority, n.i.e." and "Multiple visible minorities" under visible minority section on census.)	2,935	2.58%	1,885	1.72%	1,295	1.21%
Total responses	113,895	99.17%	109,785	99.07%	106,905	98.66%
Total population	114,853	100%	110,817	100%	108,362	100%
Notes: Totals greater than 100% due to multiple origin responses. Demographics based on 2012 Canadian federal electoral redistribution riding boundaries.

== Members of Parliament ==
This riding elected the following members of Parliament:

Parliament	Years	Member	Party
Port Moody—Coquitlam; Riding created from Mission—Port Moody and New Westminster—Coquitlam
34th	1988–1993	Ian Waddell	New Democratic
35th	1993–1997	Sharon Hayes	Reform
36th	1997–1997	Sharon Hayes	Reform
36th	1998–2000	Lou Sekora	Liberal
Port Moody—Coquitlam—Port Coquitlam
37th	2000–2004	James Moore	Alliance
Riding dissolved into Port Moody—Westwood—Port Coquitlam and New Westminster—Coquitlam
Port Moody—Coquitlam; Riding re-created from New Westminster—Coquitlam and Port Moody—Westwood—Port Coquitlam
42nd	2015–2019	Fin Donnelly	New Democratic
43rd	2019–2021	Nelly Shin	Conservative
44th	2021–2025	Bonita Zarrillo	New Democratic
45th	2025–present	Zoe Royer	Liberal

== Election results ==
Graph of election results in Port Moody—Coquitlam (since 2015, minor parties that never got 2% of the vote or didn't run consistently are omitted)

=== Port Moody—Coquitlam, 2015–present ===
2025 Canadian federal election
Party	Candidate	Votes	%	±%	Expenditures
Liberal	Zoe Royer	27,074	43.53	+14.05	$85,998.06
Conservative	Paul Lambert	25,126	40.40	+8.44	$133,822.91
New Democratic	Bonita Zarrillo	9,360	15.05	–19.99	$108,727.91
Green	Nash Milani	519	0.83	–	none listed
Marxist–Leninist	Roland Verrier	117	0.19	–0.01	none listed
Total valid votes/expense limit		62,196	99.35	–	$134,035.25
Total rejected ballots		408	0.65	–0.16	
Turnout		62,604	70.26	+7.76	
Eligible voters		89,103			
Liberal notional gain from New Democratic		Swing		+17.02	
Source: Elections Canada

2021 Canadian federal election
Party	Candidate	Votes	%	±%	Expenditures
New Democratic	Bonita Zarrillo	19,367	37.18	+6.25	$89,534.85
Conservative	Nelly Shin	16,605	31.88	+0.67	$112,630.84
Liberal	Will Davis	14,231	27.32	–1.74	$102,904.43
People's	Desta McPherson	1,766	3.39	+1.87	$1,212.95
Marxist–Leninist	Roland Verrier	122	0.23	+0.13	none listed
Total valid votes/expense limit		52,091	99.19	–	$113,310.09
Total rejected ballots		428	0.81	+0.15	
Turnout		52,519	62.50	–3.26	
Eligible voters		84,028			
New Democratic gain from Conservative		Swing		+2.79	
Source: Elections Canada

2021 federal election redistributed results
Party	Vote	%
New Democratic	18,740	35.04
Conservative	17,093	31.96
Liberal	15,771	29.48
People's	1,776	3.32
Others	109	0.20

2019 Canadian federal election
Party	Candidate	Votes	%	±%	Expenditures
Conservative	Nelly Shin	16,855	31.21	+1.74	$97,170.69
New Democratic	Bonita Zarrillo	16,702	30.93	–5.12	$84,014.36
Liberal	Sara Badiei	15,695	29.06	–1.83	$83,994.80
Green	Bryce Watts	3,873	7.17	+3.74	none listed
People's	Jayson Chabot	821	1.52	–	$1,508.00
Marxist–Leninist	Roland Verrier	57	0.11	–0.05	none listed
Total valid votes/expense limit		54,003	99.34	–	$108,951.45
Total rejected ballots		361	0.66	+0.35	
Turnout		54,364	65.76	–3.18	
Eligible voters		82,674			
Conservative gain from New Democratic		Swing		+3.43	
Source: Elections Canada

2015 Canadian federal election
Party	Candidate	Votes	%	±%	Expenditures
New Democratic	Fin Donnelly	19,706	36.05	–4.41	$108,104.25
Liberal	Jessie Adcock	16,888	30.89	+22.36	$46,183.13
Conservative	Tim Laidler	16,112	29.47	–17.02	$143,435.34
Green	Marcus Madsen	1,878	3.44	–0.82	$7,735.81
Marxist–Leninist	Roland Verrier	83	0.15	–	none listed
Total valid votes/expense limit		54,667	99.68	–	$212,494.90
Total rejected ballots		174	0.32	–	
Turnout		54,841	68.93	–	
Eligible voters		79,555			
New Democratic notional gain from Conservative		Swing		+6.31	
Source: Elections Canada

2011 federal election redistributed results
Party	Vote	%
Conservative	20,203	46.49
New Democratic	17,580	40.45
Liberal	3,706	8.53
Green	1,849	4.25
Others	120	0.28

=== Port Moody—Coquitlam—Port Coquitlam, 2000–2004 ===
Graph of election results in Port Moody—Coquitlam(—Port Coquitlam) (minor parties that never got 2% of the vote or didn't run consistently are omitted)

2000 Canadian federal election: Port Moody—Coquitlam—Port Coquitlam
Party	Candidate	Votes	%	±%	Expenditures
Alliance	James Moore	28,631	49.69	+14.12	$59,661
Liberal	Lou Sekora	16,937	29.39	–9.97	$71,922
New Democratic	Jamie Arden	5,340	9.27	–7.72	$25,248
Progressive Conservative	Joe Gluska	4,506	7.82	+3.00	$4,011
Green	Dave King	839	1.46	–0.87	none listed
Marijuana	Paul A. Geddes	818	1.42	–	$647
Canadian Action	Will Arlow	452	0.78	+0.24	$2,886
Communist	George Gidora	98	0.17	–	$189
Total valid votes		57,621	99.68		
Total rejected ballots		187	0.32	–	
Turnout		57,808	63.37	–	
Eligible voters		91,222			
Alliance gain from Liberal		Swing		+12.04	
Change for the Canadian Alliance is based on the Reform Party.
Source: Elections Canada

=== Port Moody—Coquitlam, 1988–2000 ===
Canadian federal by-election, 30 March 1998 On the resignation of Sharon Hayes, 1 October 1997
Party	Candidate	Votes	%	±%
Liberal	Lou Sekora	11,284	39.36	+9.86
Reform	Jim Cunningham	10,195	35.56	–8.05
New Democratic	John Keryluk	4,869	16.98	–2.72
Progressive Conservative	Joe Gluska	1,381	4.82	–0.71
Green	Dave Norman	666	2.32	+1.01
Canadian Action	Will Arlow	156	0.54	–
Independent	François C. Nantel	86	0.30	–
Independent	True Grit Verrier	35	0.12	–
Total valid votes		28,672	99.71	
Total rejected ballots		84	0.29	–0.07
Turnout		28,756	35.68	–30.79
Eligible voters		80,586		
Liberal gain from Reform		Swing		+8.96
Source: Elections Canada

1997 Canadian federal election
Party	Candidate	Votes	%	±%	Expenditures
Reform	Sharon Hayes	23,113	43.61	+9.63	$41,036
Liberal	Kwangyul Peck	15,636	29.50	+1.75	$61,017
New Democratic	Joy Langan	10,444	19.70	–1.46	$45,967
Progressive Conservative	Joe Gluska	2,927	5.52	–7.29	$12,844
Green	Debra Lynne Eilers	695	1.31	+0.76	none listed
Natural Law	Roger Shapka	190	0.36	–0.20	none listed
Total valid votes		53,005	99.64		
Total rejected ballots		192	0.36	–0.12	
Turnout		53,197	66.47	–2.99	
Eligible voters		80,027			
Reform hold		Swing		+3.94	
Source: Elections Canada

1993 Canadian federal election
Party	Candidate	Votes	%	±%
Reform	Sharon Hayes	20,257	33.97	+30.98
Liberal	Celso Boscariol	16,546	27.75	+12.29
New Democratic	Ian Waddell	12,616	21.16	–23.06
Progressive Conservative	Jim Allard	7,641	12.82	–23.36
National	Mark Hemming	1,556	2.61	–
Natural Law	William Robert Ayling	333	0.56	–
Green	Geoffrey Berner	329	0.55	–0.13
Libertarian	Paul A. Geddes	239	0.40	–0.07
Independent	Cathie Sackville	64	0.11	–
Commonwealth of Canada	Elizabeth Smith	44	0.07	–
Total valid votes		59,625	99.52	
Total rejected ballots		288	0.48	+0.11
Turnout		59,913	69.47	–10.45
Eligible voters		86,247		
Reform gain from New Democratic		Swing		+9.35
Source: Elections Canada

1988 Canadian federal election
Party	Candidate	Votes	%	±%
New Democratic	Ian Waddell	23,871	44.22	–
Progressive Conservative	Mae E. Reid	19,528	36.17	–
Liberal	Richard R. Popp	8,346	15.46	–
Reform	Bligh Stockwell	1,617	3.00	–
Green	William Roger Marshall	368	0.68	–
Libertarian	Harry W. Bull	253	0.47	–
Total valid votes		53,983	99.63	
Total rejected ballots		200	0.37	–
Turnout		54,183	79.92	–
Eligible voters		67,800		
This riding was created from parts of Mission—Port Moody and New Westminster—Coquitlam, which elected a Progressive Conservative and a New Democrat, respectively, in the last election.
Source: Elections Canada

== See also ==
- List of Canadian electoral districts
- Historical federal electoral districts of Canada
