= Coquitlam City Council =

City council in British Columbia, Canada

Type
- Type: Unicameral

Leadership
- Mayor: Craig Hodge since November 9, 2026

Structure
- Length of term: 4 years
- Salary: $66,018.69 (councillors) $169,607.40 (mayor)
- Seats: 8 councillors and 1 mayor

Elections
- Voting system: Plurality at-large voting (councillors); First past the post (mayor)
- Last election: October 17, 2026
- Next election: October 19, 2030

Coquitlam City Council is the governing body for the City of Coquitlam, British Columbia, Canada.

The council consists of the mayor and eight councillors.

The councillors are councillors-at-large elected for the entire city.

== Coquitlam City Council members ==
2026–present
Elected in the 2026 municipal elections

- Craig Hodge, Mayor
- Matt Djonlic, Councillor
- Robert Mazzarolo, Councillor
- Steve Kim, Councillor
- Teri Towner, Councillor
- Matthew Sebastiani, Councillor
- Harvey Su, Councillor
- Rosalinda Thorleifson, Councillor
- Benjamin Perry, Councillor

2022–2026
Elected in the 2022 municipal elections

- Richard Stewart, Mayor
- Craig Hodge, Councillor
- Teri Towner, Councillor
- Brent Asmundson, Councillor
- Dennis Marsden, Councillor
- Trish Mandewo, Councillor
- Steve Kim, Councillor
- Matt Djonlic, Councillor
- Robert Mazzarolo, Councillor

2018–2022

- Richard Stewart, Mayor
- Craig Hodge, Councillor
- Chris Wilson, Councillor
- Teri Towner, Councillor
- Bonita Zarrillo, Councillor (until 2021)
- Brent Asmundson, Councillor
- Dennis Marsden, Councillor
- Trish Mandewo, Councillor
- Steve Kim, Councillor

2014–2018

- Richard Stewart, Mayor
- Brent Asmundson, Councillor
- Craig Hodge, Councillor
- Dennis Marsden, Councillor
- Terry O'Neill, Councillor
- Mae Reid, Councillor
- Teri Towner, Councillor
- Chris Wilson, Councillor
- Bonita Zarrillo, Councillor

2011–2014

- Richard Stewart, Mayor
- Brent Asmundson, Councillor
- Craig Hodge, Councillor
- Neal Nicholson, Councillor
- Terry O'Neill, Councillor
- Mae Reid, Councillor
- Lou Sekora, Councillor

In the 2013 provincial election, two sitting councillors, Linda Reimer and Selina Robinson, were elected to the Legislative Assembly of British Columbia. Reimer initially speculated in the press about continuing to perform both roles, or simply taking an unpaid leave of absence from her city council duties until the 2014 municipal election, to spare taxpayers the expense of a by-election; the council ultimately decided on July 8, 2013 to hold by-elections to replace them.
