= Coquitlam Town Centre =

Coordinates: 49.2915°N 122.7906°W

Coquitlam Town Centre Coquitlam City Centre
- Town centre of Coquitlam
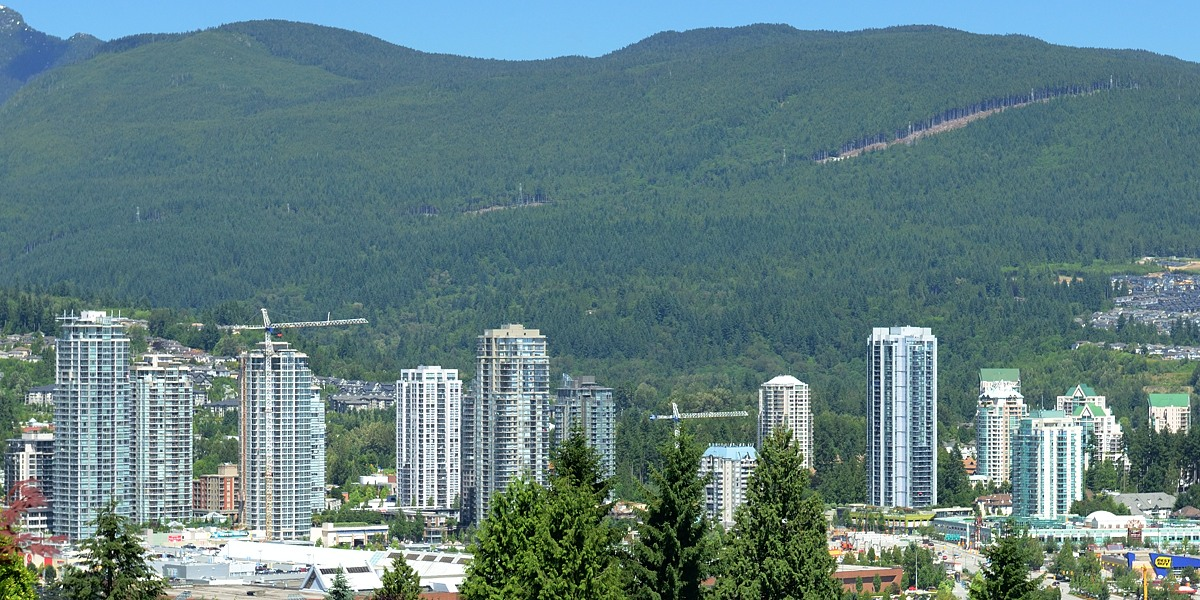
- Skyscrapers in the Town Centre area of the city of Coquitlam, with the North Shore Mountains in the background.

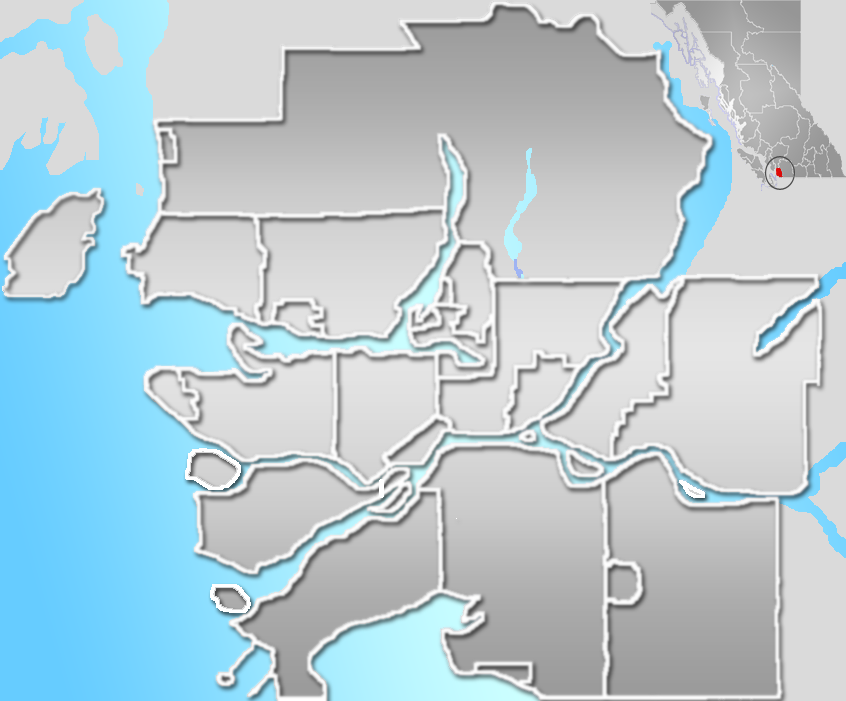
- Location of Coquitlam within Metro Vancouver
- Country: Canada
- Province: British Columbia
- Region: Lower Mainland
- Regional District: Metro Vancouver
- City: Coquitlam

Government
  - Mayor: Craig Hodge
  - MP (Fed.): Ron McKinnon (Liberal)
  - MLA (Prov.): Ryan Peterson (BC Conservative)

Area
  - Total: 7.2 km^{2} (2.8 sq mi)

Population (2021)
  - Total: 33,218
- Time zone: UTC−7 (PCT)

Coquitlam Town Centre is the main commercial and retail neighbourhood for the city of Coquitlam, British Columbia. Coquitlam Town Centre covers 723 hectares (1,787 acres). The Town Centre also contains the highest concentration of high-rise condominiums in the Tri-Cities and northeastern Metro Vancouver.

== History ==
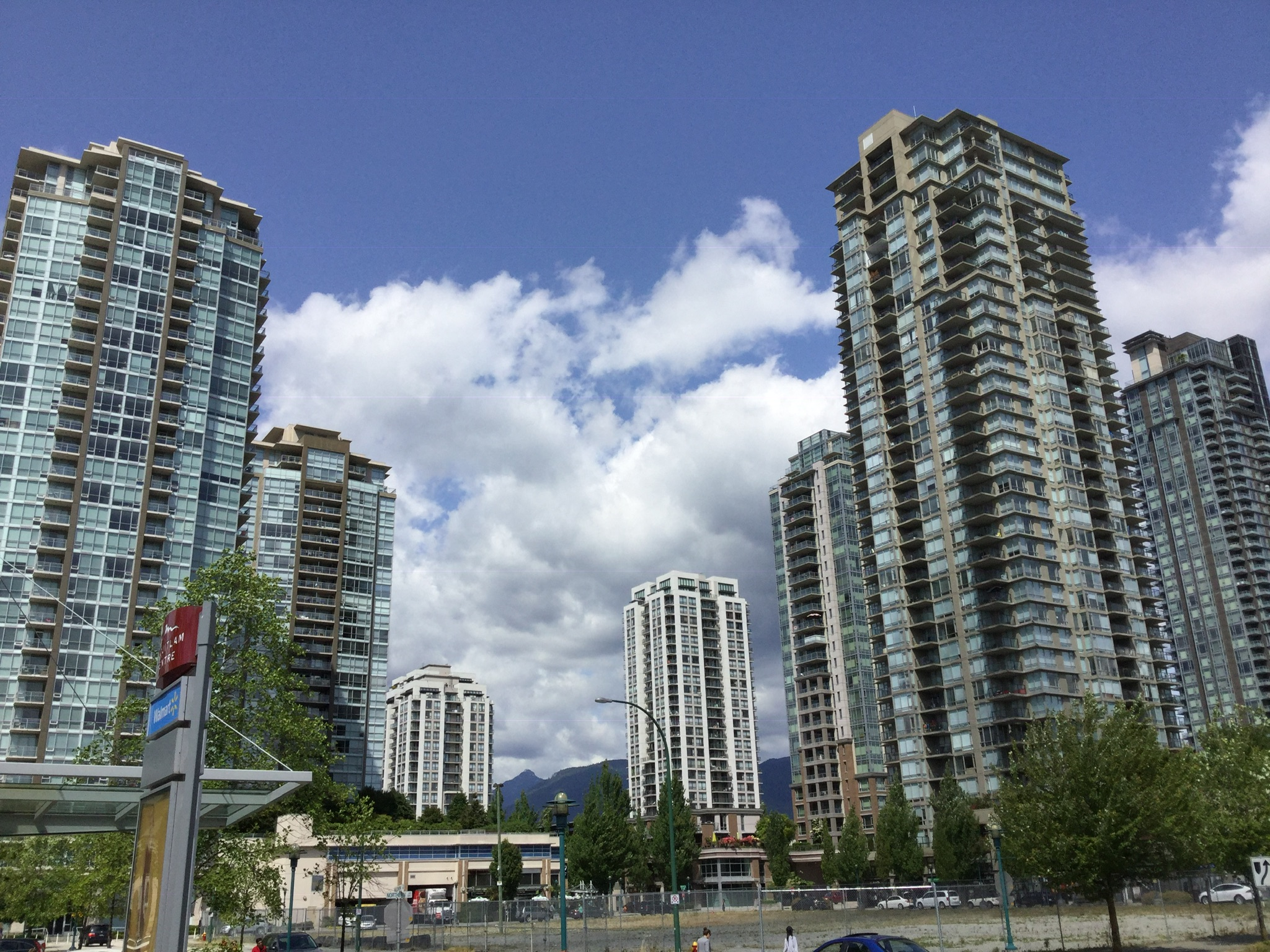
Picture of Coquitlam taken from Coquitlam Centre

The concept of a town centre for the area dates back to 1975. In 1979, Coquitlam Centre Mall was built and became the main catalyst for the creation of a Town Centre. Over the following years, rapid population growth took place as new housing and low rise apartment developments were built over previously forested areas.

In the early 2000s, the City of Coquitlam updated the Town Centre Plan. Shortly thereafter during the mid 2000s, City Centre began to densify as various high-rise condominium developments took place. This is reflected in the rapid population growth of the recent decade, as City Centre grew by over 15% from 2011 to 2016.

The intent is to have a concentration of high-density housing, offices, cultural, entertainment and education facilities to serve major growth areas of the region, served by rapid transit service.

Coquitlam Town Centre is currently undergoing an update of the Town Centre plan.

== Geography ==
Geographically, Coquitlam has two large parcels of land (one in the south-west, the other in the north-east), with a smaller central area between them. This central area, Coquitlam Town Centre, was designated as a "Regional Town Centre" under the Metro Vancouver's Livable Region Strategic Plan.

== Demographics ==
Population history
Year	Pop.	±%
1981	5,061	—
1986	10,890	+115.2%
1991	17,023	+56.3%
1996	21,898	+28.6%
2001	23,895	+9.1%
2006	24,270	+1.6%
2011	27,215	+12.1%
2016	31,380	+15.3%
Source: City of Coquitlam

=== Population ===
Upon completion of the Coquitlam Centre Mall in 1979, the population of Coquitlam's City Centre was estimated to be 5,000.

Today, City Centre has grown to a population of 31,380.

=== Ethnicity ===
Panethnic groups in Coquitlam City Centre (2011−2021)
Panethnic group	2021 census		2016 census		2011 census	
Panethnic group	Pop.	%	Pop.	%	Pop.	%
European (Note: Statistic includes all persons that did not make up part of a visible minority or an indigenous identity.)	12,340	37.49%	13,650	41.7%	14,020	49.44%
East Asian (Note: Statistic includes total responses of "Chinese", "Korean", and "Japanese" under visible minority section on census.)	11,520	35%	10,870	33.21%	8,030	28.31%
Middle Eastern (Note: Statistic includes total responses of "West Asian" and "Arab" under visible minority section on census.)	3,880	11.79%	3,420	10.45%	2,560	9.03%
Southeast Asian (Note: Statistic includes total responses of "Filipino" and "Southeast Asian" under visible minority section on census.)	1,445	4.39%	1,535	4.69%	1,295	4.57%
South Asian	1,010	3.07%	835	2.55%	770	2.72%
Latin American	815	2.48%	590	1.8%	505	1.78%
Indigenous	570	1.73%	755	2.31%	475	1.67%
African	355	1.08%	465	1.42%	220	0.78%
Other/multiracial (Note: Statistic includes total responses of "Visible minority, n.i.e." and "Multiple visible minorities" under visible minority section on census.)	980	2.98%	610	1.86%	485	1.71%
Total responses	32,915	99.09%	32,730	99.07%	28,360	98.32%
Total population	33,218	100%	33,038	100%	28,846	100%
Note: Totals greater than 100% due to multiple origin responses.

=== Language ===
Languages spoken in City Centre (2016) Source:		%
Language	English	69%
Language	Chinese	14%
Language	Korean	6%
Language	Persian	4%
Language	Other	7%
Total %		100%

== Rapid Transit ==
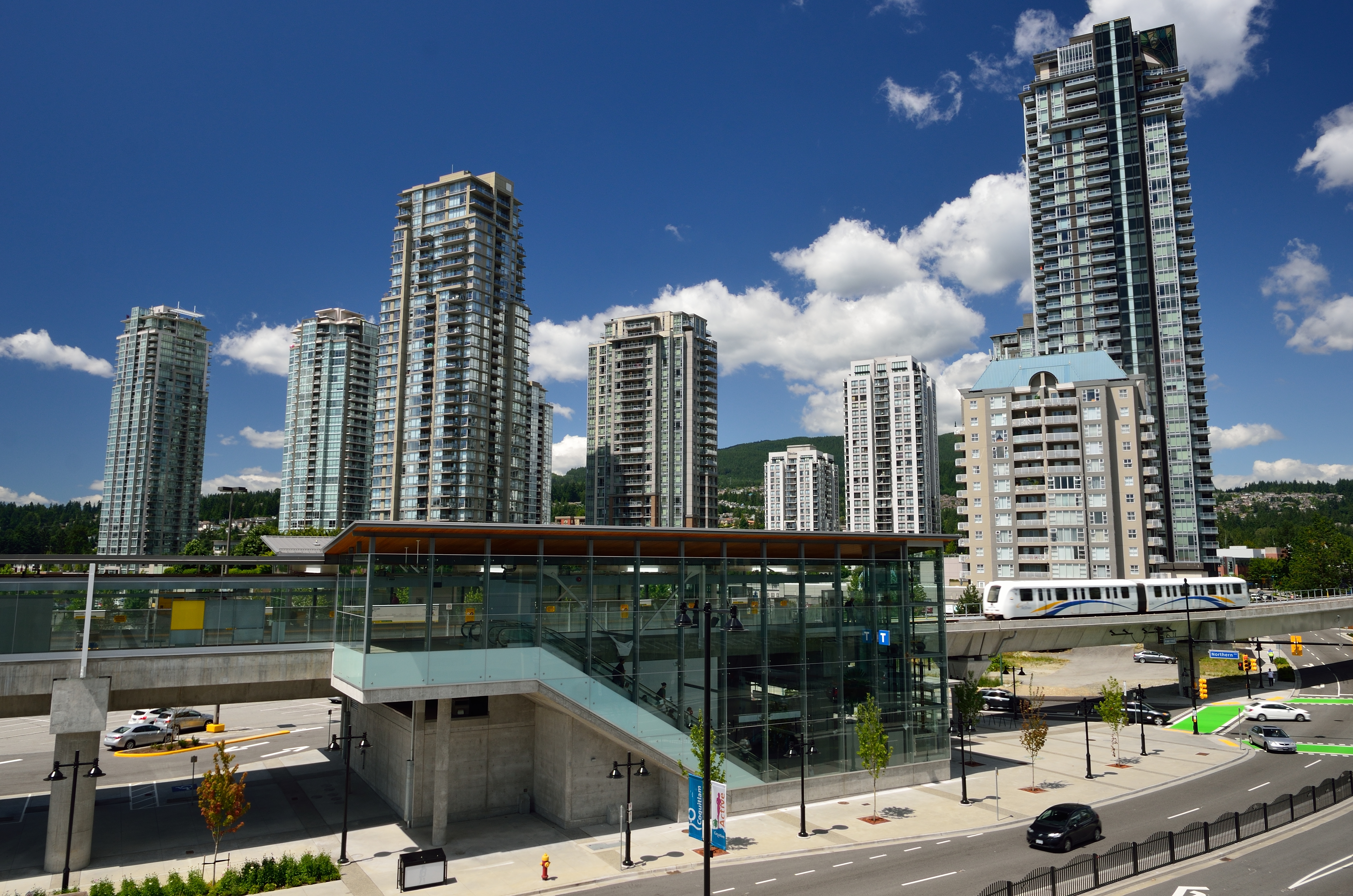
Lincoln Station is situated in the heart of Coquitlam Town Centre

=== Evergreen Extension ===
Three stations for the Evergreen Extension are in operation in the town centre - Coquitlam Central, Lincoln, and Lafarge Lake-Douglas Station, which is the terminus of the SkyTrain line.

== Facilities ==
Public facilities presently at the Town Centre Park area include:

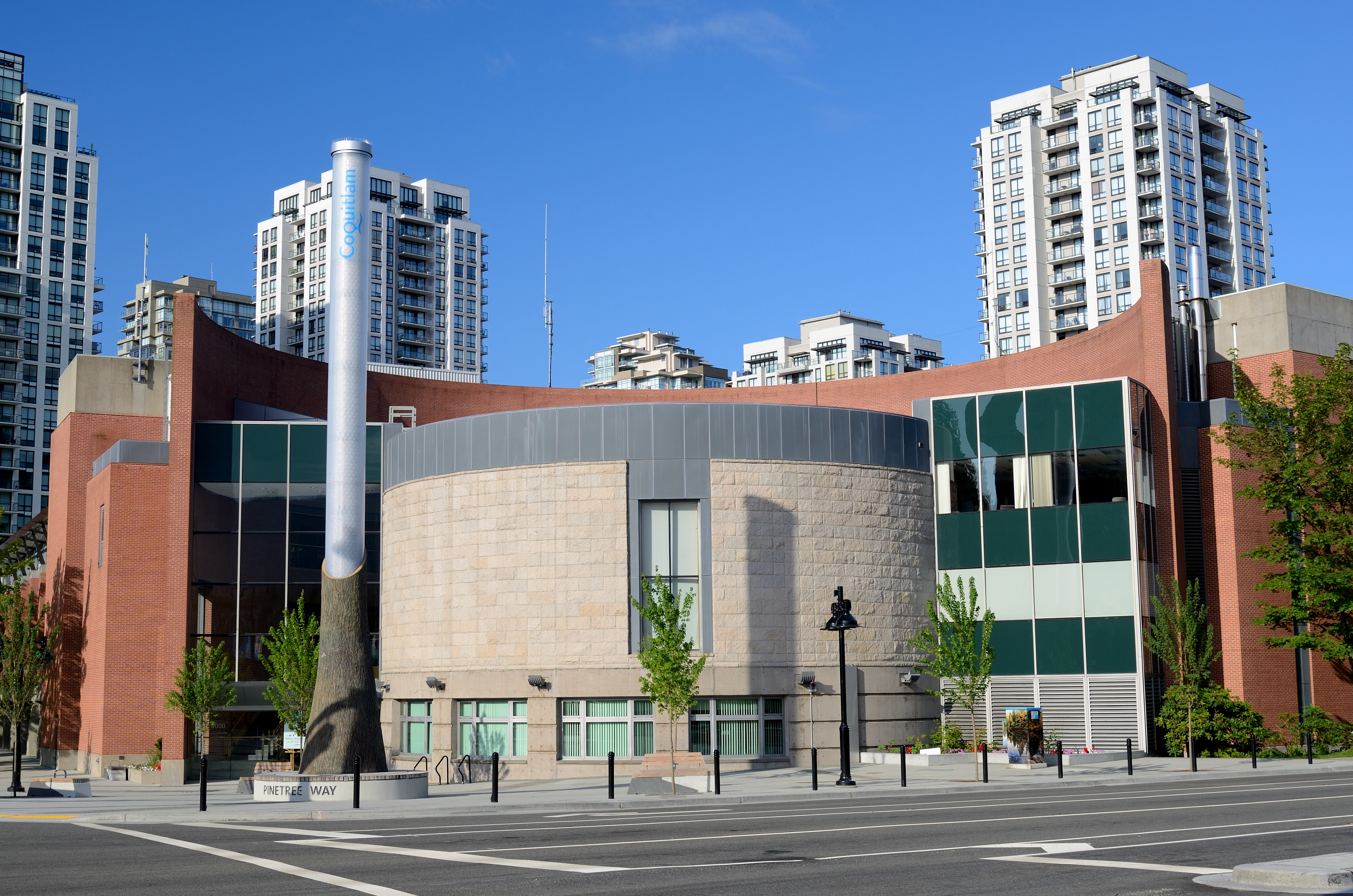
Coquitlam City Hall

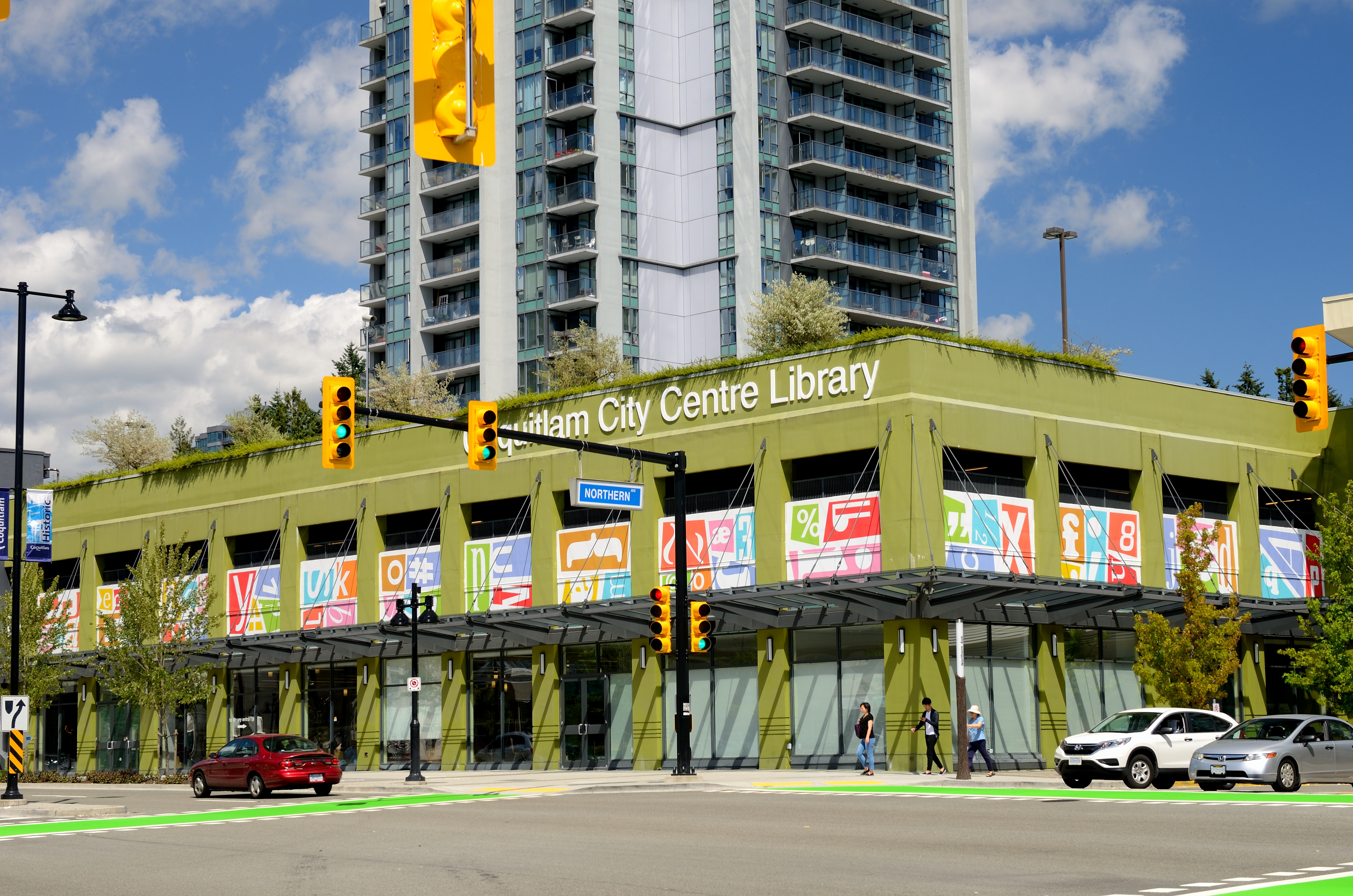
Coquitlam Public Library

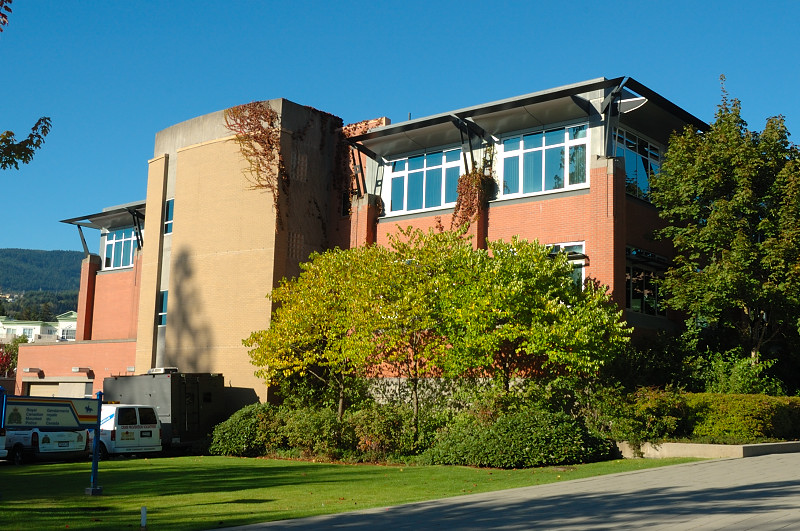
Police Station

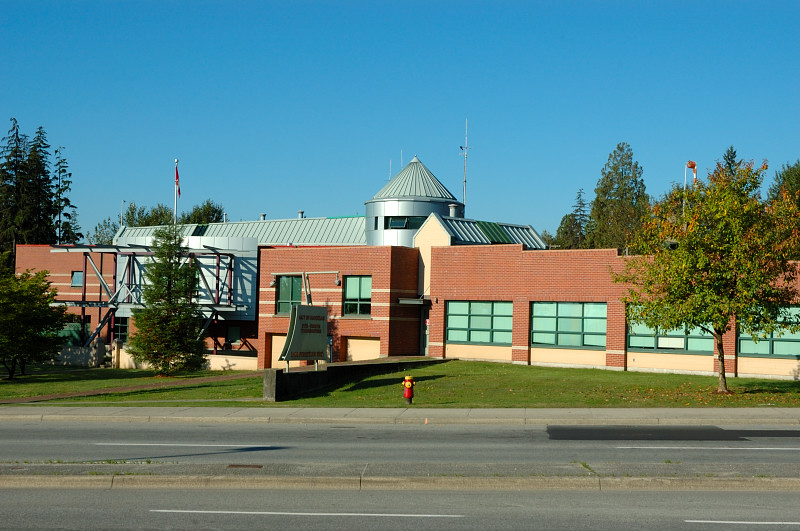
Fire Hall

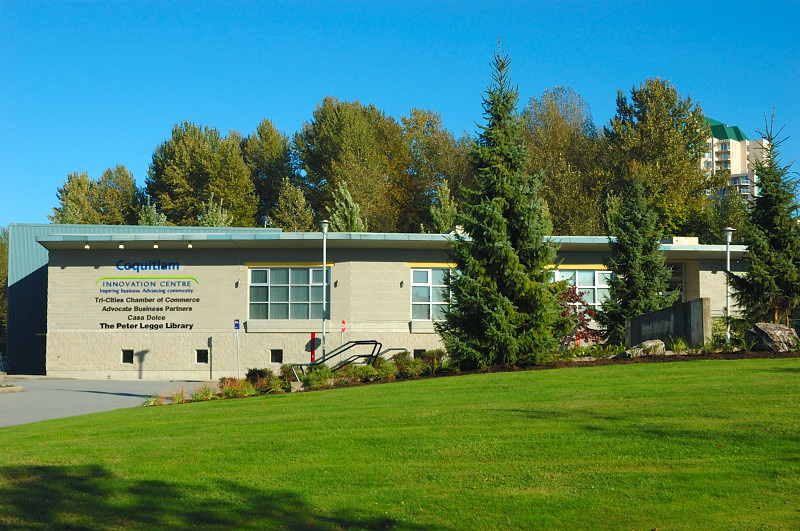
Innovation Centre

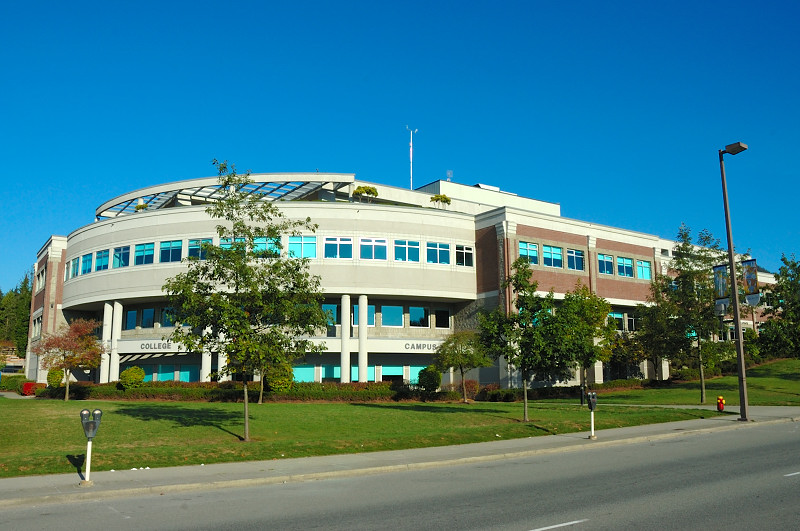
Douglas College

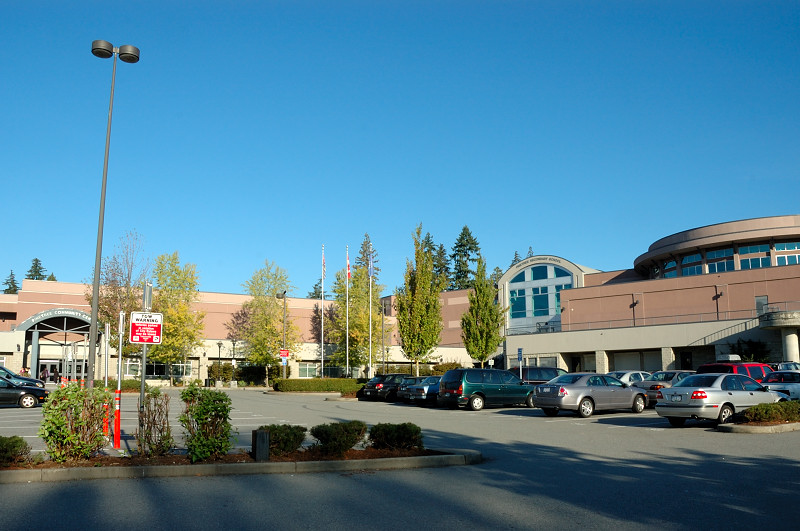
Pinetree Secondary School

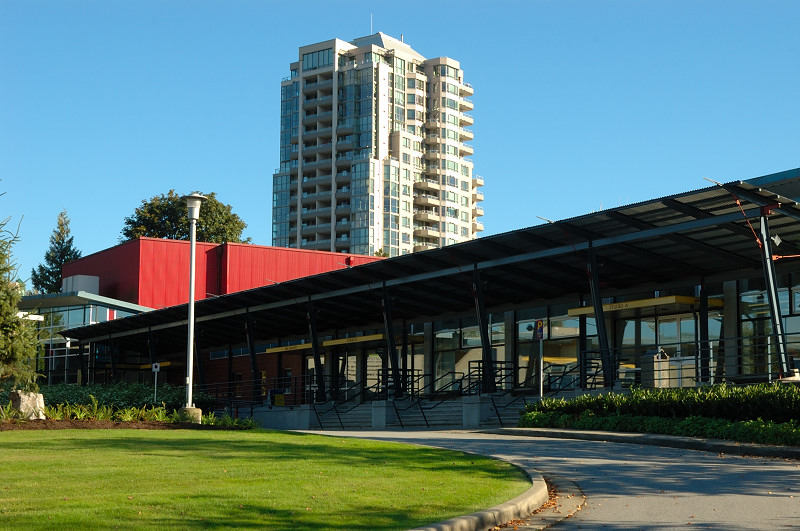
Evergreen Cultural Centre

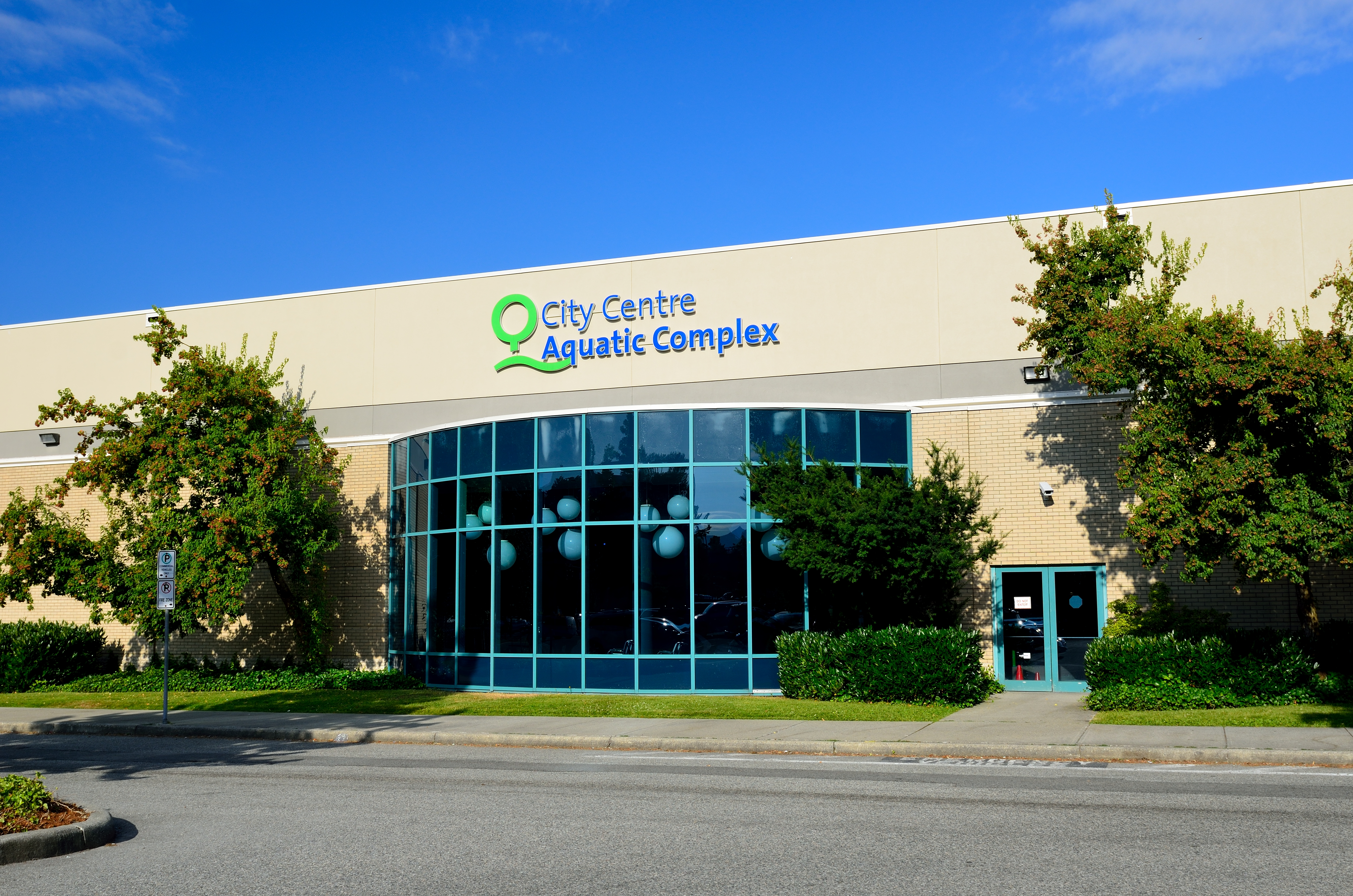
City Centre Aquatic Complex

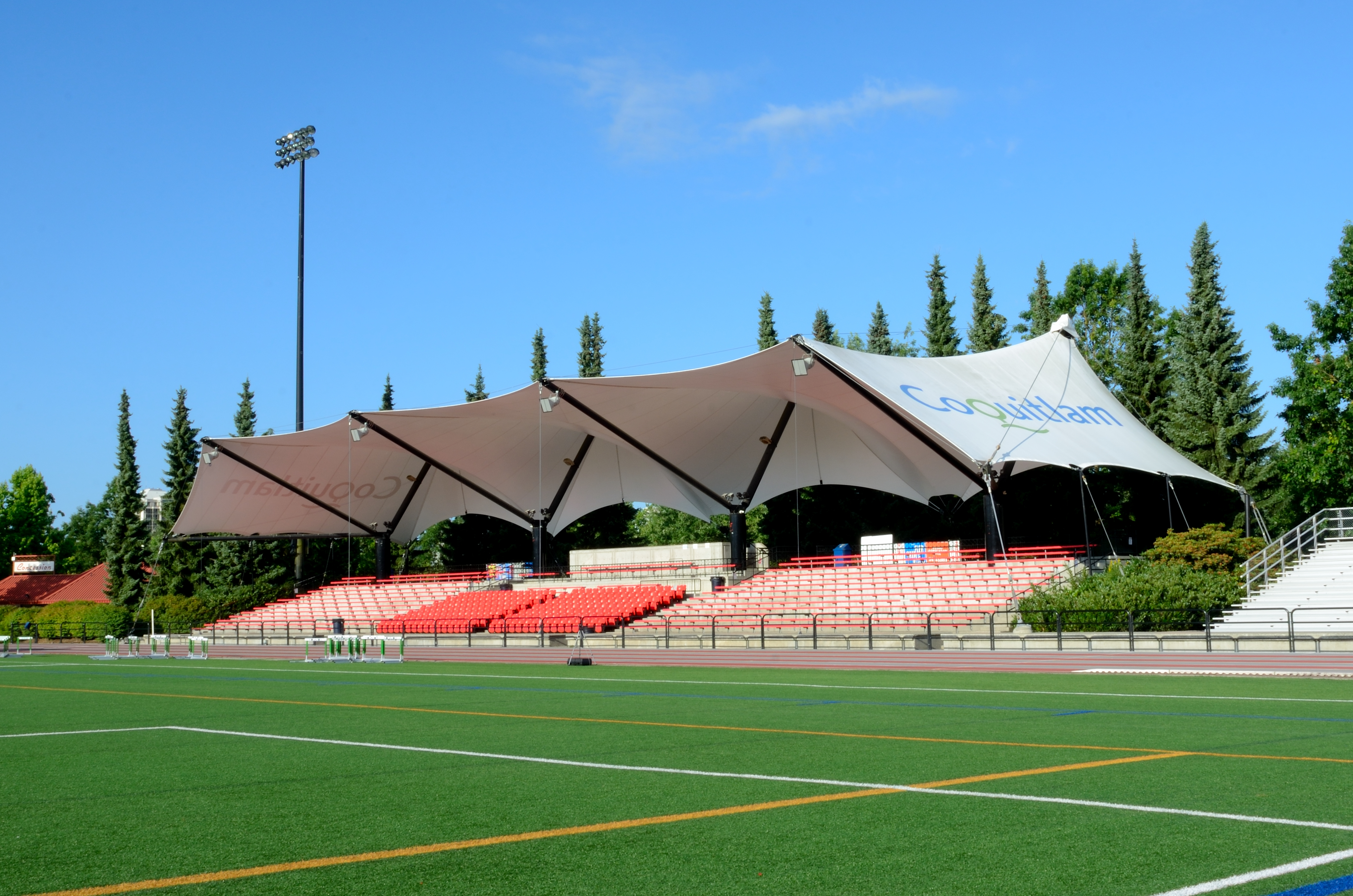
Percy Perry Stadium

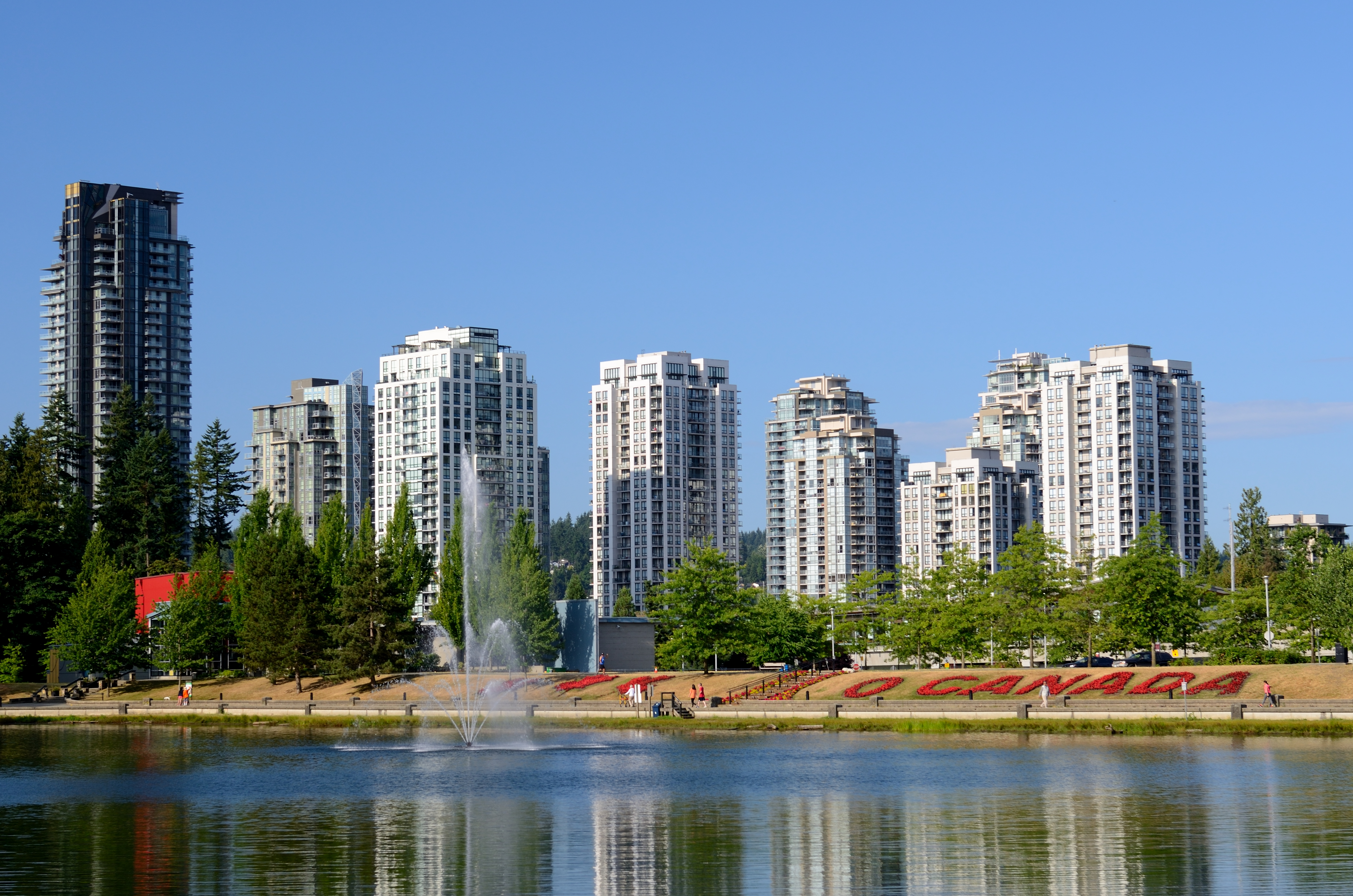
Lafarge Lake

== Parks ==
- Glen Park
- Town Centre Park

== Retail and Shopping ==
Coquitlam Centre - constructed in 1979 is the main mall in the City Centre.

Other major retail centres:

- Pinetree Village
- Sunwood Square
- Henderson Place Mall
- Westwood Mall
- Various mini malls in the Glen and Johnson area

== Schools ==
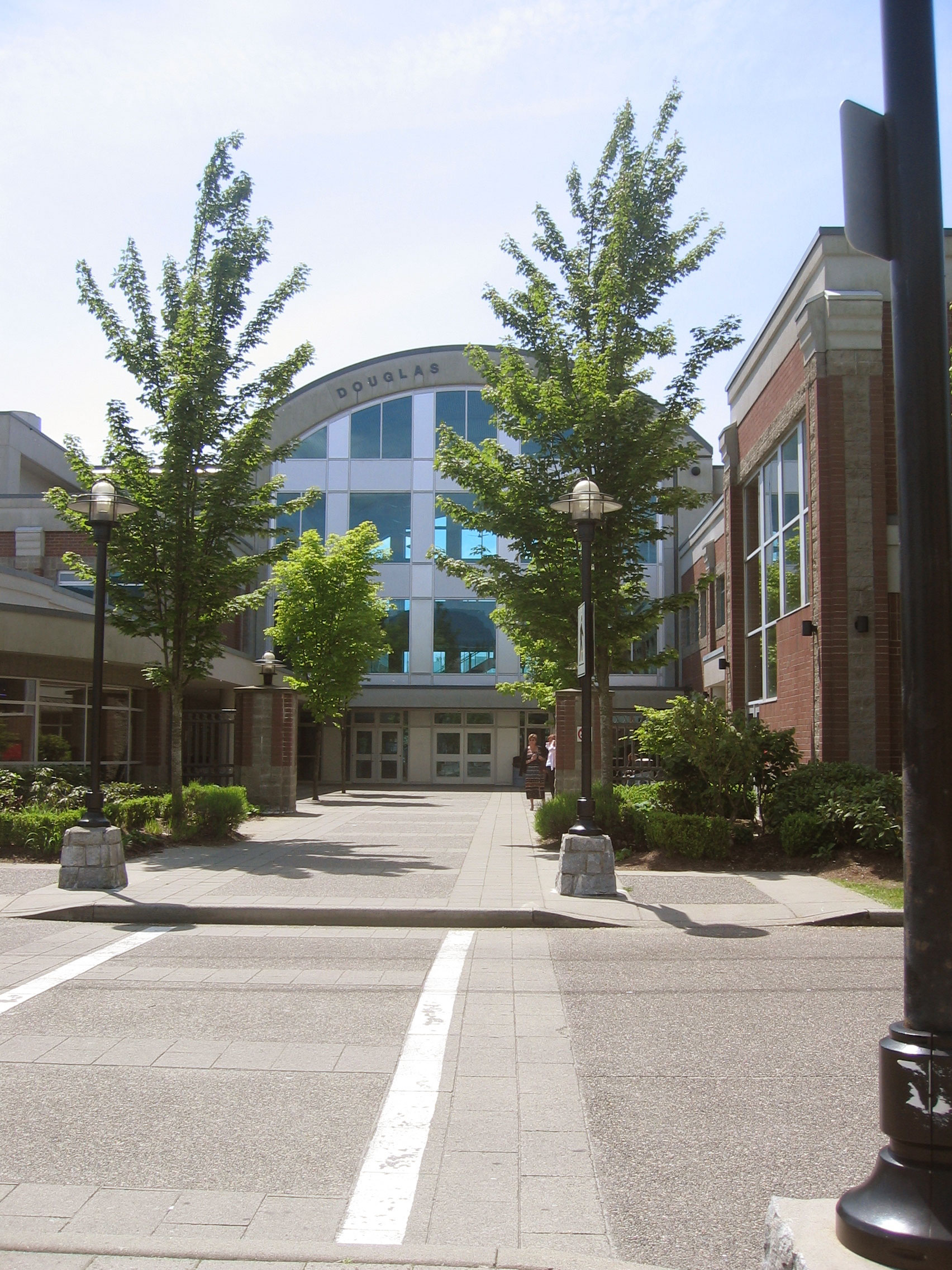
David Lam Campus

=== Elementary ===
- Glen Elementary
- Walton Elementary
- Nestor Elementary

=== Middle ===
- Maple Creek Middle
- Scott Creek Middle

=== Secondary ===
- Gleneagle Secondary
- Pinetree Secondary

=== College ===
- Douglas College (David Lam Campus)
