= 102nd Grey Cup =

2014 Canadian Football championship game

Hamilton Tiger-Cats	Calgary Stampeders
(9–9)	(15–3)
16	20
Head coach: Kent Austin	Head coach: John Hufnagel
	1	2	3	4	Total
Hamilton Tiger-Cats	0	7	0	9	16
Calgary Stampeders	7	10	3	0	20
- Date: November 30, 2014
- Stadium: BC Place
- Location: Vancouver
- Most Valuable Player: Bo Levi Mitchell, QB (Stampeders)
- Most Valuable Canadian: Andy Fantuz, WR (Tiger-Cats)
- Favourite: Stampeders by 8
- National anthem: Nikki Yanofsky with Coastal Sound Music Academy
- Coin toss: Thomas J. Lawson
- Referee: André Proulx
- Halftime show: Imagine Dragons
- Attendance: 52,056

Broadcasters
- Network: (Canada) TSN, RDS (United States) ESPN2
- Announcers: (TSN): Chris Cuthbert, Glen Suitor, Rod Smith, Jock Climie, Matt Dunigan, Chris Schultz, Milt Stegall
- Ratings: 4.1 million (average); 10 million (total)

The 102nd Grey Cup was a Canadian football game played November 30, 2014, between the West Division champion Calgary Stampeders and East Division champion Hamilton Tiger-Cats, to determine the Canadian Football League (CFL) championship for the 2014 season. The contest was held at BC Place stadium in Vancouver, British Columbia. The Stampeders won the contest 20–16 to claim their seventh Grey Cup championship in franchise history and first since 2008. Calgary quarterback Bo Levi Mitchell was named the Grey Cup Most Valuable Player, while Hamilton's Andy Fantuz received the Dick Suderman Trophy as most outstanding Canadian.

== Host city ==
In 2008, the CFL awarded an expansion team to Ottawa and named the city host of the 2014 Grey Cup, conditional on the franchise being ready to play by 2010. Lawsuits and construction delays during the renovation of Frank Clair Stadium pushed the start date for the city's expansion team, the Ottawa RedBlacks, to 2014. As a consequence, the CFL sought a new venue for the contest. The CFL moved the game to BC Place Stadium in Vancouver, British Columbia, which had most recently hosted the 99th Grey Cup in 2011. (Ottawa would eventually be awarded the 105th Grey Cup.)

== Path to the Grey Cup ==
=== Calgary Stampeders ===
The Calgary Stampeders finished the regular season with the top record in the CFL at 15–3. Their 15 wins also tied the franchise record. They advanced directly to the West Division final where they hosted the Edmonton Eskimos. Led by running back Jon Cornish, the Stampeders eliminated the Eskimos with a 43–18 victory. Cornish was named the Most Outstanding Canadian for 2014 after leading the CFL in rushing with 1,082 yards despite missing nine games due to injuries. He was one of two award winners for the Stampeders as centre Brett Jones was named Most Outstanding Offensive Lineman. The team was led by 24-year-old quarterback Bo Levi Mitchell, who stood 15–2 in his career as a starter and who won his first playoff game in the victory over Edmonton.

=== Hamilton Tiger-Cats ===
The Hamilton Tiger-Cats finished atop the East Division with a 9–9 record. They hosted the Montreal Alouettes, who also ended the regular season at 9–9, in the East Final. The contest was the first playoff game at Tim Hortons Field, which opened mid-season and where Hamilton won all six home games played there. Hamilton advanced to their second consecutive Grey Cup final with a 40–24 victory that featured two punt returns for touchdowns by Brandon Banks. Hamilton's offence was led by quarterback Zach Collaros, who played his first season as a CFL starter in 2014 after serving as the back-up to Ricky Ray with the Toronto Argonauts for two seasons.

=== Head to head ===
The Stampeders entered the game as 8 1/2-point favourites to win the title as the dominant story line entering the game centred around whether Hamilton could complete an upset of Calgary. The Stampeders won both regular-season games, 10–7 at Calgary in week four and 30–20 at Hamilton in week eight. Both teams were without key players during those games as both Jon Cornish and Zach Collaros were unavailable for both contests. The Grey Cup game pitted the best rushing offence in the CFL – Calgary averaged 143.4 yards per game rushing – against a Hamilton team that allowed the fewest rushing yards, 73.4 per game.

The 2014 Grey Cup represented the third time the Stampeders and Tiger-Cats had met in the championship. Hamilton won the 87th Grey Cup in 1999 by a 32–21 score, which avenged a Calgary 26–24 victory at 1998's 86th Grey Cup. Hamilton made its second consecutive appearance in the title game; they lost the 101st Grey Cup to the Saskatchewan Roughriders. Calgary's most recent appearance came in 2012 when they lost the 100th Grey Cup to the Toronto Argonauts.

== Game summary ==
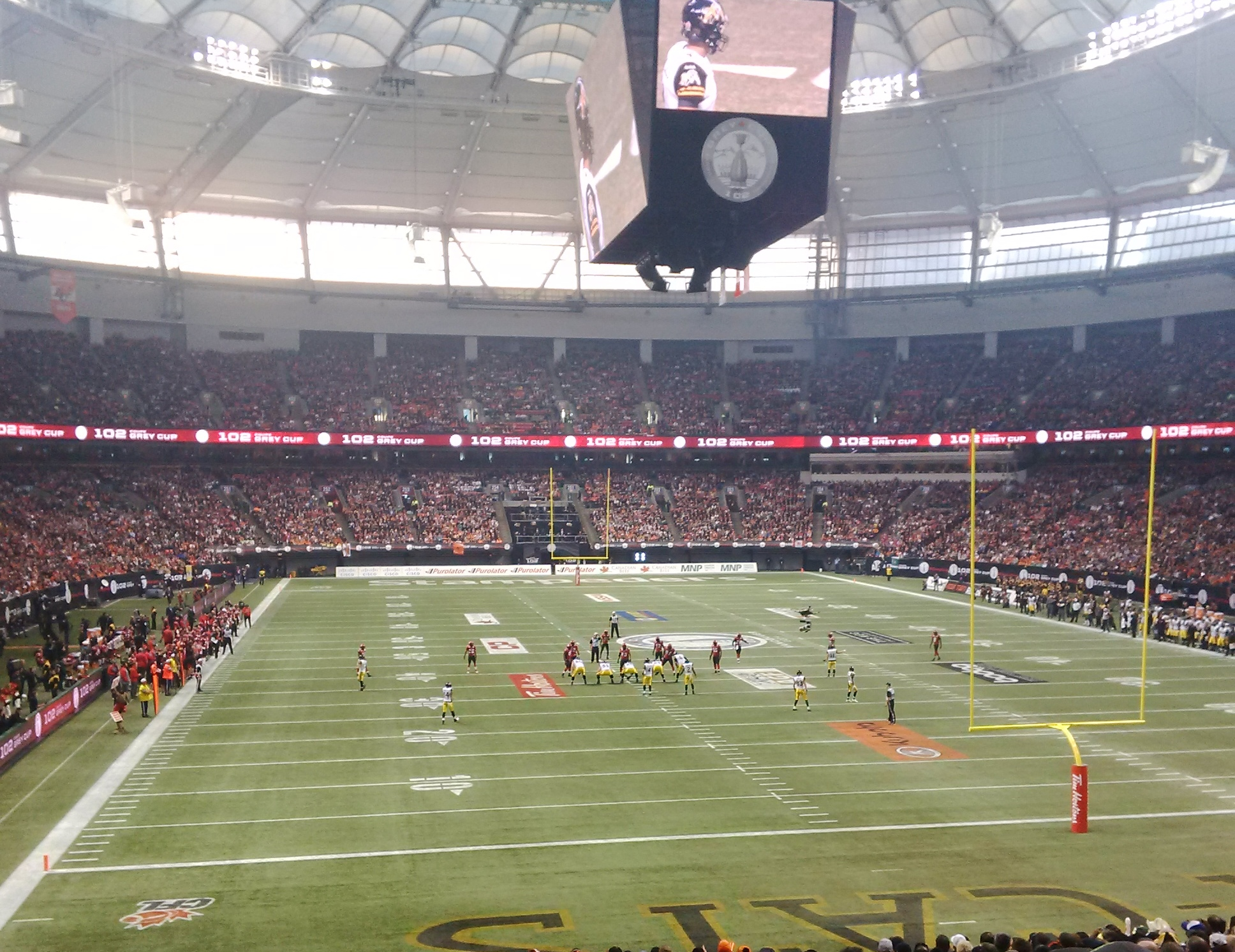
The Hamilton Tiger-Cats face the Calgary Stampeders in the 102nd Grey Cup.

The Hamilton Tiger-Cats were unable to get their offence working early in the game as they ended the first quarter with −12 yards rushing and only +4 net yards. Calgary had 120 net yards, 117 passing, but began the second quarter with only a 7–0 lead following a one-yard touchdown rush by Drew Tate at the 9:48 mark. Tate scored a second touchdown 48 seconds into the second quarter and Calgary added a field goal to extend their lead to 17–0. The Stampeders maintained the score when Demonte Bolden blocked Hamilton's attempted field goal with six minutes remaining in the half, however the Tiger-Cats scored their first points of the game three minutes later when quarterback Zach Collaros connected with Brandon Banks on a 45-yard pass play; Calgary led 17–7 at the half.

Stampeders quarterback Bo Levi Mitchell completed ten consecutive passes midway through the game, tying him for the third longest streak in Grey Cup history, but the Stampeders could add only a field goal in the third quarter to take a 20–7 lead. Hamilton scored a field goal early in the fourth quarter to cut the deficit to ten points, then regained possession after Delvin Breaux intercepted Mitchell for the only turnover of the game. Collaros moved the Tiger-Cats offence to within three yards of the goal line, but Hamilton was forced to settle for a field goal. The Tiger-Cats against marched the ball into Calgary territory but were again prevented from scoring a touchdown after Corey Mace sacked Collaros on second down. Hamilton scored a third consecutive field goal to cut the lead to 20–16 with 2:05 remaining in the contest.

Calgary was forced to punt with less than a minute to play. Brandon Banks received the punt and ran the ball 90 yards for an apparent touchdown to give Hamilton a lead; however, the play was called back when Taylor Reed was penalized for an illegal block. Instead, Hamilton's offence began at their defensive 12-yard line. The Tiger-Cats subsequently ran out of time as Collaros' attempted pass on the final play of the game fell incomplete.

The 20–16 victory represented the franchise's seventh Grey Cup championship and first since 2008. Mitchell was named the Grey Cup Most Valuable Player after completing 25 of 34 passes for 334 yards. Hamilton's Andy Fantuz received the Dick Suderman Trophy as the Most Outstanding Canadian. He received six passes for 81 yards.

== Scoring summary ==
First quarter
CGY – TD Tate 1 yd rush (5:12) 7–0 CGY

Second quarter
CGY – TD Tate 1 yd rush (14:26) 14–0 CGY
CGY – FG Paredes 11 yd (2:17) 17–0 CGY
HAM – TD Banks 45 yd receiving (1:21) 17–7 CGY

Third quarter
CGY – FG Paredes 20 yd (4:20) 20–7 CGY

Fourth quarter
HAM – FG Medlock 25 (11:55) 20–10 CGY
HAM – FG Medlock 12 (5:35) 20–13 CGY
HAM – FG Medlock 37 (2:05) 20–16 CGY

== Entertainment ==
Alternative rock band Imagine Dragons headlined the contest's half time show. It was the third time an American band has been brought in to perform, a decision that some Canadians have criticized due to a preference for using the stage to promote local talent. Canadian country and rock artist Dallas Smith performed during the pre-game festivities and Nikki Yanofsky (accompanied by 102 members of the Coastal Sound Music Academy) sang O Canada. In Vancouver, organizers opted to host events and festivities in a single location around the city's convention centre in a bid to create a "small-town feel" and try to "overcome the big-small divide that is apparent between CFL cities".

== Attendance ==
The 2014 Grey Cup game was not a sellout, with 1,423 tickets remaining unsold. Vancouver having hosted the event just three years prior was cited as the main cause for the slump, while the mediocre performance by home side BC Lions provided few opportunities to drum up interest over the course of the season.
