= Glen Park =

Glen Park may refer to:

- Glen Park, Mauritius, a suburb of Vacoas-Phoenix, Mauritius
- Glen Park, San Francisco, a neighborhood in San Francisco, California
- Glen Park Station, a BART station servicing Glen Park, San Francisco
- Glen Park, Toronto, a neighborhood in Toronto, Ontario
- Glen Park, New York, a village in New York
- Glen Park, Williamsville, a park in Williamsville, New York
- Glen Park (Gary), a neighborhood in Gary, Indiana
- Glen Park (Coquitlam), a park in Coquitlam, British Columbia
- A district in the fictional city of Los Santos (Grand Theft Auto) from the game Grand Theft Auto: San Andreas
