= Karin Bubaš =

Canadian artist

Karin Bubaš (born 1976 in Vancouver, British Columbia) is a contemporary Canadian artist known for her work in various media including photography, painting, and drawing.

== Early life ==
Bubaš grew up in North Vancouver and graduated from Emily Carr University of Art and Design.

== Artwork ==
Karin Bubaš began exhibiting her photographic artwork in 1997. Her work was included in several group shows including after photography curated by Vancouver photographer Roy Arden. Bubaš' first solo exhibition, Happy Friday Night, was held at Vancouver's Artspeak Gallery in 1999. Her next major series of work, Leon's Palace, was completed in 2001 and depicts images from a Vancouver crack house. Works from Leon's Palace are owned by the Vancouver Art Gallery as well as noted Canadian writer and artist Douglas Coupland, who included images from the series in his 2002 book Souvenir of Canada.

From 2003 to the present, Bubaš' most widely recognized bodies of photographic work include Ivy House, featuring images from the interior of a Victorian English row house shortly after the owner had died; Studies in Landscape and Wardrobe, a long-running series featuring costumed and staged female figures in park-like settings; and Colour Field, a series that includes both photographs and paintings and explores the relationship between the two mediums.

Works from Ivy House and Studies in Landscape and Wardrobe were included in Bubaš major solo exhibition A short history of subjects and objects, curated by Catherine Bedard and held at the Canadian Cultural Centre in Paris in 2008. In 2013, photographs by Bubaš were installed at a Vancouver SkyTrain station as part of Capture Photography Festival.

=== The Hills ===
In 2009 Bubaš created a series of pastel drawings entitled With Friends Like These... depicting characters from the MTV reality series The Hills including Lauren Conrad, Whitney Port, Heidi Montag, and others. The series was originally inspired by pastel works by Paul Cesar Helleu that depicted attractive and famous women in the high ranks of Paris society during the late 1800s. Images from With Friends Like These... were widely published and appeared in The New York Times, In Touch Weekly, Magenta Magazine, The Vancouver Sun, and on numerous blogs and websites. The works from this series were presented in a solo exhibition at the Charles H. Scott Gallery at Emily Carr University of Art and Design in 2009.

== Collections ==
- Vancouver Art Gallery
- Glenbow Museum
- Morris and Helen Belkin Art Gallery

== Select exhibitions ==
- Pictures from Here, Vancouver Art Gallery (2017)
- Art School High, Gordon Smith Gallery, North Vancouver (2017)
- The Poetics of Space, Vancouver Art Gallery (2015)
- Scenes from the Paper Forest (solo), Evergreen Cultural Centre, Coquitlam (2014)
- Emily Carr and the Theatre of Transcendence, Vancouver Art Gallery (2012)
- With Friends Like These… (solo), Charles H. Scott Gallery, Vancouver (2009)
- The Tree: From the Sublime to the Social, curated and organized by the Vancouver Art Gallery (2008), and touring to the Evergreen Cultural Centre, Coquitlam (2009), Kamloops Art Gallery (2009), and Kelowna Art Gallery (2010)
- Home Theatre, SFU Galleries, Burnaby (2006)
- Happy Friday Night, (solo), Artspeak, Vancouver (1999)
