= Pacific Symphonic Wind Ensemble =

- Also known as: PSWE
- Origin: Vancouver, B.C.
- Genres: Wind Band
- Years active: 1981-present
- Members: Music Director; David Branter
- Website: PSWE.ca

The Pacific Symphonic Wind Ensemble is a Canadian wind band from the Metro Vancouver area in British Columbia. The ensemble's home venue is the Evergreen Cultural Centre in Coquitlam.

The PSWE was founded in 1981 by Maurice Backun in Vancouver, and consists of both professional and amateur musicians performing both traditional and alternative wind music from a variety of composers. The band features guest conductors and soloists. Marc Crompton became PSWE's Music Director in 1999.

In 2005, the ensemble were the guest artists at the 2005 World Association of Symphonic Bands and Ensembles conference in Singapore.

== Instrumentation ==
The Pacific Symphonic Wind Ensemble currently has a roster of 46 performers:

- Flute (4)
- Oboe (2)
- Clarinet (10)
- Alto Clarinet (1)
- Bass Clarinet (1)
- Saxophone (4)
- Bassoon (2)
- Trumpet (5)
- French horn (4)
- Trombone (3)
- Euphonium (1)
- Tuba (2)
- Timpani (1)
- Percussion (4)
- Double bass (1)
- Piano (1)

== Discography ==
The Pacific Symphonic Wind Ensemble has released four CDs:

- Midnight Sleigh Ride (1996)
- Mazama (1997)
- Festivo (2001)
- Trajectories (2007)

PSWE also released a double CD as part of the 2005 World Association for Symphonic Bands and Ensembles (WASBE) conference in Singapore.
