= Town Centre Park =

- Interactive map of Town Centre Park
- Type: Municipal
- Location: 1299 Pinetree Way; Coquitlam, British Columbia; Canada
- Coordinates: 49.2886°N 122.787°W
- Operator: City of Coquitlam
- Status: Open all year
- Website: www.coquitlam.ca/Facilities/Facility/Details/Town-Centre-Park-84

Town Centre Park is a park in central Coquitlam, British Columbia, just north of the Coquitlam Centre shopping mall. The park is surrounded by Coquitlam's city hall, main police station, main fire hall, City Centre Aquatic Complex, and the David Lam campus of Douglas College, Pinetree Secondary School, as well as many houses and apartments.

The Park was originally a gravel pit owned by Lafarge. It was created in the mid-1980s when the company donated Lafarge Lake to the City of Coquitlam.

The park saw the addition of beach volleyball courts in 2005, and a $10 million expansion in 2006-07 which saw the building of two additional synthetic FieldTurf fields, the conversion of two existing fields to FieldTurf, new areas for shot put, javelin, and discus/hammer throw, and new parking lots.

The southwest corner of the Park is host to the Lafarge Lake–Douglas station terminus of the area's Evergreen Extension of the Millennium Line Skytrain rapid transit, which opened in late 2016.

Town Centre Park hosts Coquitlam's annual Lights At Lafarge Winter Light Display.

== Amenities ==
- Evergreen Cultural Centre
- Percy Perry Stadium
- Lafarge Lake
- Amphitheater
- Sports fields, including 4 FieldTurf fields
- Pedestrian trails
- Splash pad
- Skateboard park
- Basketball, inline hockey, beach volleyball and tennis courts
- BMX track
- Inspiration Garden
- Outdoor Ping Pong tables

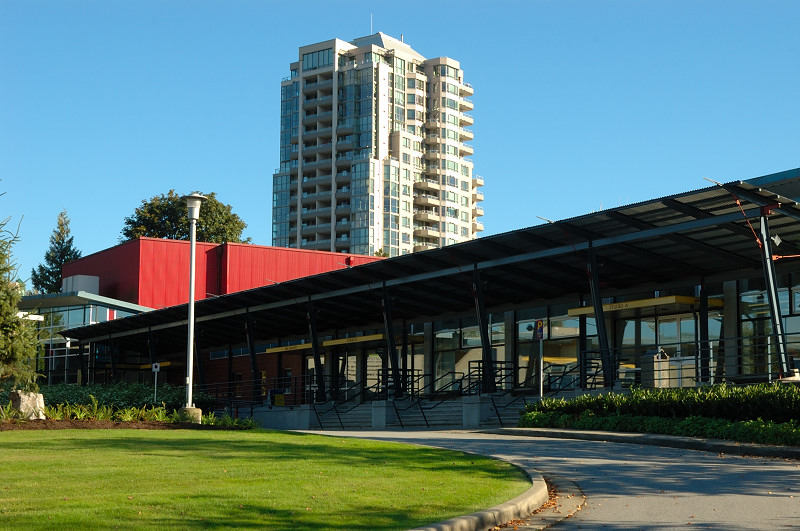
Evergreen Cultural Centre

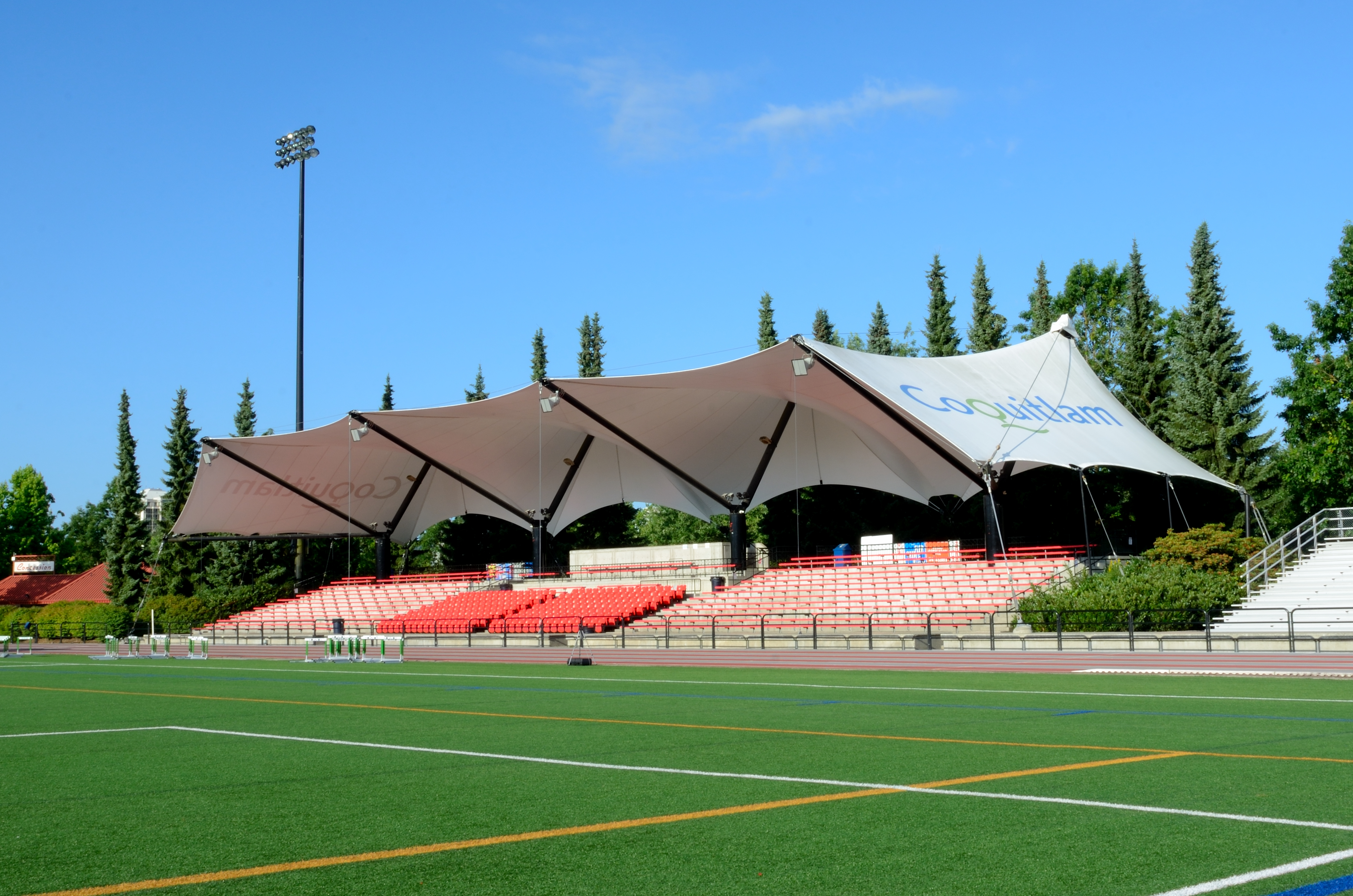
Percy Perry Stadium

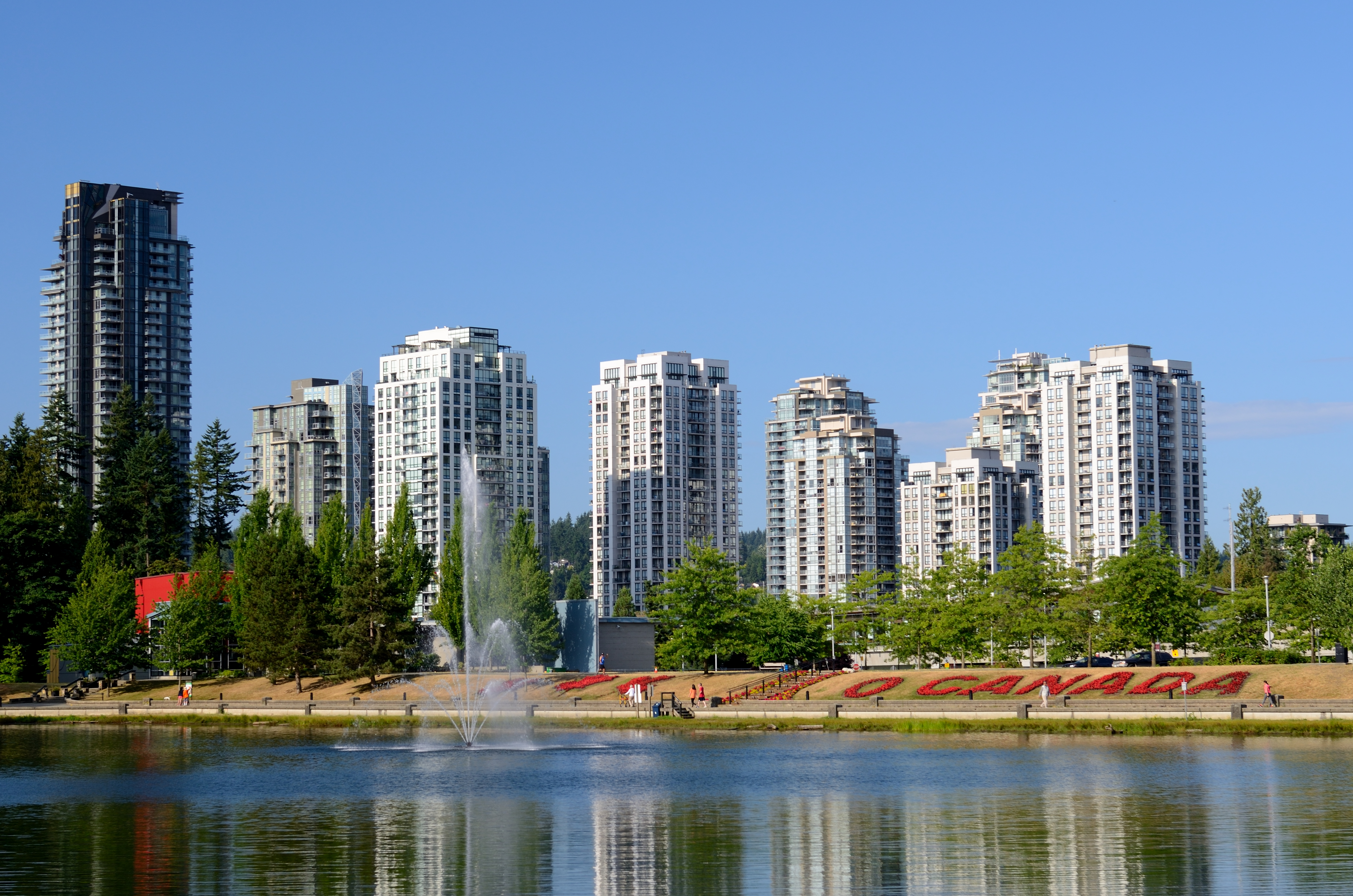
Lafarge Lake
