= Stage 43 Theatrical Society =

Community theatre company in British Columbia

- Formation: 1982
- Type: Theatre group
- Purpose: Community Theatre
- Location: Coquitlam, BC
- Website: Official website

The Stage 43 Theatrical Society is a community theatre company in the Tri-Cities area of British Columbia. Stage 43's home theatre is the Evergreen Cultural Centre in Coquitlam, where it produces three shows each season.

== Company ==
Stage 43 was founded in 1982, and the current President is Claire Pinkett. The company performs approximately three to four major productions per season, regularly featuring comedies, mysteries, and dramas.

The company is a member of the Theatre BC Fraser Valley Zone and the Community Theatre Coalition.

Stage 43 celebrated its 40th anniversary in 2023.

== “Not-for-Profits Helping Not-for-Profits” ==
In 2016, Stage 43 launched a “not-for-profits helping not-for-profits” initiative, where it would partner with another organization on its productions to help raise awareness of certain issues. Stage 43 would promote their partner organization’s cause and donate to them partial proceeds from tickets sold for the productions. The partner organizations have included Tri-City Transitions Society, Act 2 Child and Family Services, Honour House, and Kwikwetlem First Nation.

== Productions ==
The theatre company's past productions have included Woman in Mind (2013), Dearly Departed (2013), Mama Won't Fly (2014), Steel Magnolias (2015), Secrets of a Soccer Mom (2015), M*A*S*H (2018), One Flew Over the Cuckoo’s Nest (2019), The Lion in Winter (2020), and Calendar Girls (2023).
