= Pinetree Secondary School =

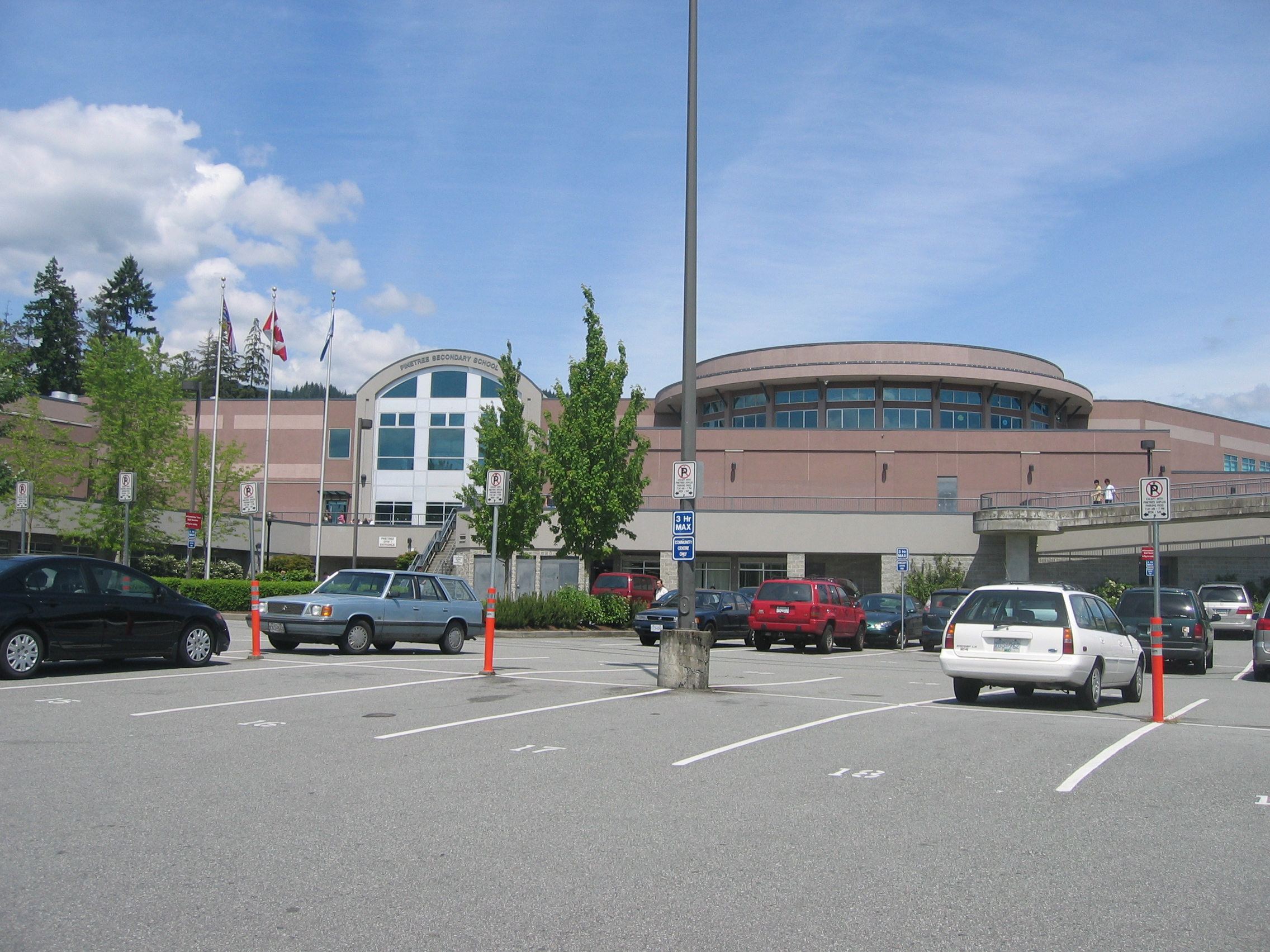

Location
- 3000 Pinewood Ave; Coquitlam, British Columbia, V3B 7Y7; Canada; 49.289889°N 122.790633°W

Information
- School type: Public, high school
- Motto: "A C T" (Accepting Challenges Together)
- Founded: 1997; 29 years ago
- School board: School District 43 Coquitlam
- School number: 4343130
- Principal: Ms. J. Close
- Staff: 100 teachers, 30 support staff
- Grades: 9-12
- Enrollment: 1491 (2022-2023 academic year)
- Language: English
- Colours: Black, Blue, Silver and Green
- Mascot: The T-Wolf
- Team name: Timberwolves
- Website: www.sd43.bc.ca/school/pinetree/Pages/default.aspx/

Pinetree Secondary School is a high school in School District 43 Coquitlam. It is located in Coquitlam, British Columbia across from Lafarge Lake, Town Centre Park and next to the David Lam Campus of Douglas College, Pinetree shares several facilities with the Coquitlam Parks and Leisure Services and Douglas College, namely the gymnasium and outdoor fields. Former Prime Minister Justin Trudeau was briefly a substitute teacher at the school in 1998.

== Academics ==
Pinetree offers a wide range of courses in Mathematics, Science, Humanities, and Arts. In addition to regular courses, it offers Honours courses in some of these departments.

=== Mathematics ===
Pinetree actively participates in a variety of mathematics competitions and frequently achieves high rankings.

== Athletic Department ==
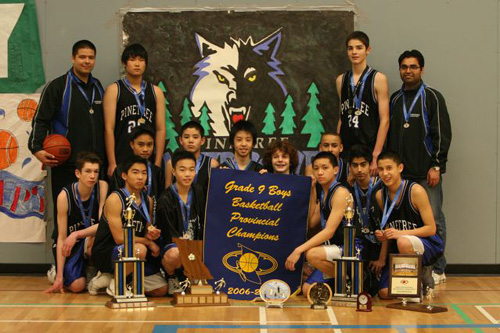
The BC Basketball Provincial Champions of 2006/2007

In 2004 Pinetree landed their first BC Senior Boys Track & Field provincial gold medal in the 4 × 100 m relay. That team, anchored by Pierre DeAbreu also featured Nathan Hardless, Jay Oduwole and Adam Moore who went undefeated the entire season.

In the 2006-2007 year, Pinetree's grade 9 basketball team was the provincial champions, while Pinetree's Junior tennis team was the Fraser Valley champions.

For 10 consecutive years, the Pinetree Senior Badminton Team placed in the top 8 of the province. During this decade of Pinetree's dominance at provincials, they placed 1st overall in 2010, 2nd in 2011 and 3rd three times.

== Arts ==
Pinetree offers a range of musical opportunities such as Junior/Senior Concert Band, Junior/Senior Jazz Band, Concert Choir and Vocal Jazz/Show Choir. Courses such as Musical Composition and Guitar are also offered. Concerts are held throughout the year, including the annual Ensembles Night, Fall/Winter/Spring Concerts, and Final concerts.

Drama is offered in Pinetree's Treehouse Theatre. Students may expand their performance ability by participating in school plays or the school's improv team, Code Orange. The shows put on by the drama department sometimes feature pit bands, singing/dancing performances, and audience interaction.

Pinetree has a student-run monthly newspaper, The Pinetree Post.

== Notable alumni ==
- Michael Cuccione - singer/songwriter/actor
- Alexz Johnson - singer/songwriter/actress
- Tyler Johnston - actor
- Doug Lynch - former NHL player
- Emily Maglio - Volleyball Player for Canada women's national volleyball team
- Choi Woo-shik - South Korean actor
