= Demonte' Bolden =

American gridiron football player (born 1985)

DeMonte' Bolden
No. 91, 96
- Position: Defensive tackle

Personal information
- Born: November 17, 1985 (age 40); Chattanooga, Tennessee, U.S.
- Listed height: 6 ft 5 in (1.96 m)
- Listed weight: 280 lb (127 kg)

Career information
- College: Tennessee
- NFL draft: 2009: undrafted

Career history
- 2009–2010: Hamilton Tiger-Cats
- 2011–2016: Calgary Stampeders

Awards and highlights
- Grey Cup champion (2014)
- Stats at CFL.ca

DeMonte' Bolden (born November 17, 1985) is an American former professional football defensive tackle who played in the Canadian Football League (CFL). He was signed by the Hamilton Tiger-Cats as a street free agent in 2009.

== College career ==
Bolden enrolled in Tennessee as a freshman, and enrolled at Hargrave Military Academy in 2004. Bolden played one game as a freshman in 2005 before becoming a starter in 2006. He started 23 games in his final two seasons but failed to live up to the expectations as the second coming of Albert Haynesworth or John Henderson. Bolden registered 6 sacks in his final season in Knoxville.
