= Coastal Sound Music Academy =

Canadian choral organization

- Origin: Coquitlam, British Columbia
- Genres: Choral
- Website: CoastalSoundMusic.com

The Coastal Sound Music Academy is a Canadian choral organization based in Coquitlam, British Columbia. It began as a children's choir within the Coquitlam school district in 1989. This was transitioned into the Coastal Sound Music Academy in 2003. Today, the academy offers several different children's choirs, a youth choir, and two adult choirs.

The flagship of the Academy is the Children's Touring Concert Choir, an auditioned choir for children 8–15 years old with unchanged voices from throughout the Metro Vancouver area. The choir has toured extensively through Europe, Cuba and China, and has produced two CDs. The CTCC has been the "children's choir in residence" at the Evergreen Cultural Centre since 2001.

The founding artistic director, Donna Otto, retired in 2009 after over twenty years with the Academy and was replaced by Diana Clark.

The Coastal Sound Music Academy is the production partner for the Coastal Sound International Choral Festival, a non-competitive biennial international choral festival introduced in 2005. The festival runs mainly at Simon Fraser University with satellite concerts around the Lower Mainland. The 2009 festival will feature ten choirs from Canada, the United States, and the Czech Republic.
