= Glen Park (Coquitlam) =

Park in Coquitlam, British Columbia

Coordinates: 49°16′49″N 122°47′20″W

Glen Park is an urban park in the Town Centre area of Coquitlam, British Columbia. It contains a picnic area, park trails, playground, ball diamond, and fenced dog park.

Starting in 2012, the 16.7-acre park went through a $508,000 upgrade in part to support all the high density construction going on in the area. During the upgrade the city controversially cut down many trees in the park.
