= City Centre Aquatic Complex =

Aquatic centre in Coquitlam, British Columbia

Coordinates: 49.285511°N 122.793994°W

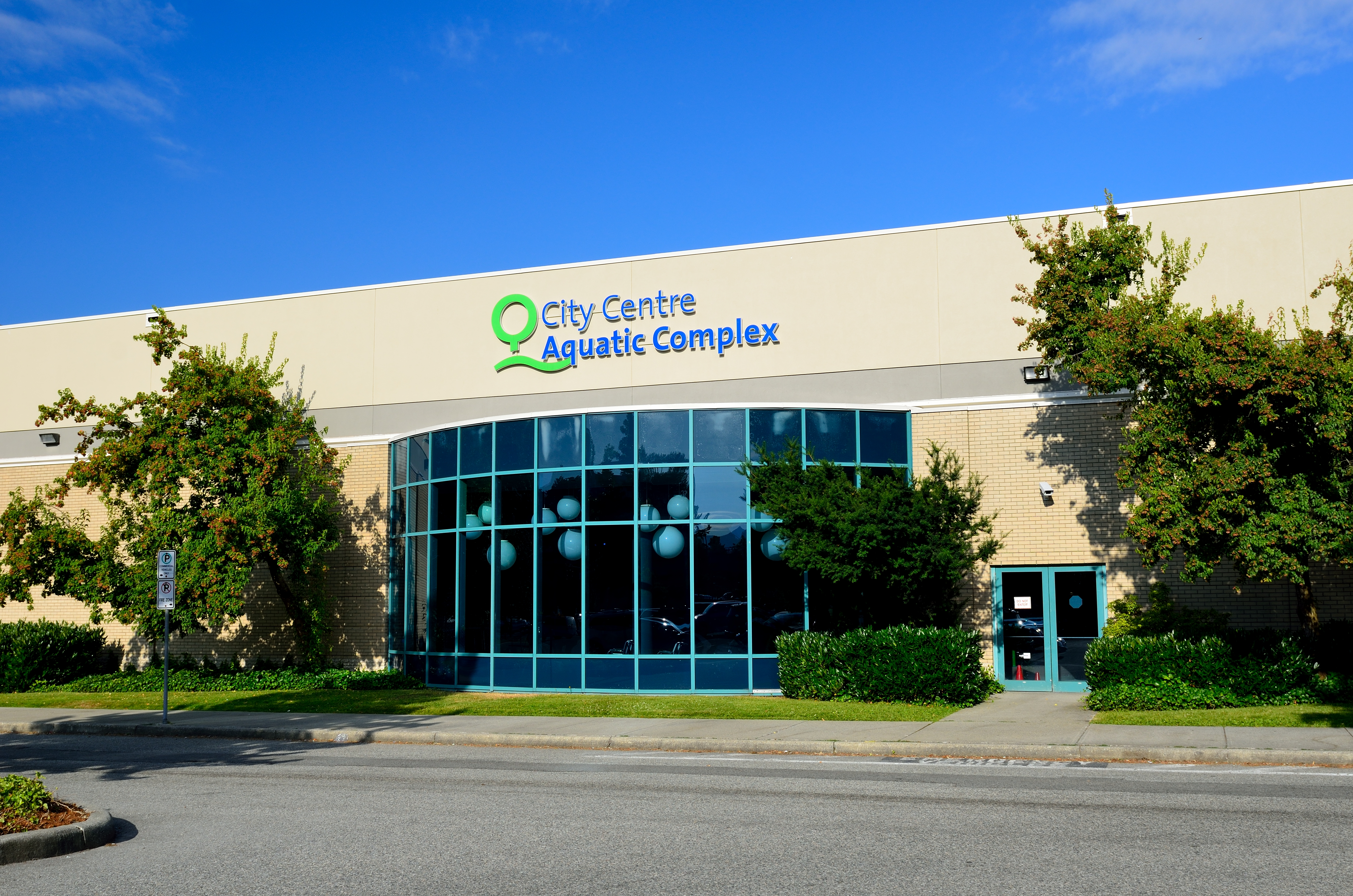
- Interactive map of City Centre Aquatic Complex
- Location: Coquitlam Town Centre
- Owner: City of Coquitlam
- Capacity: 250 (temporary)

Construction
- Opened: 1994

Tenants
- Coquitlam Sharks Aquatic Club; Eagle Ridge Aquatic Centre Physiotherapy

The City Centre Aquatic Complex is an indoor aquatic centre featuring an Olympic size swimming pool in the Town Centre area of Coquitlam, British Columbia. The building was designed by Vic Davies Architect Ltd., built at a cost of $8.2 million, and opened in March 1994. The pools use ozone for secondary water purification.
