= Lafarge Lake =

Lake in Coquitlam, British Columbia, Canada

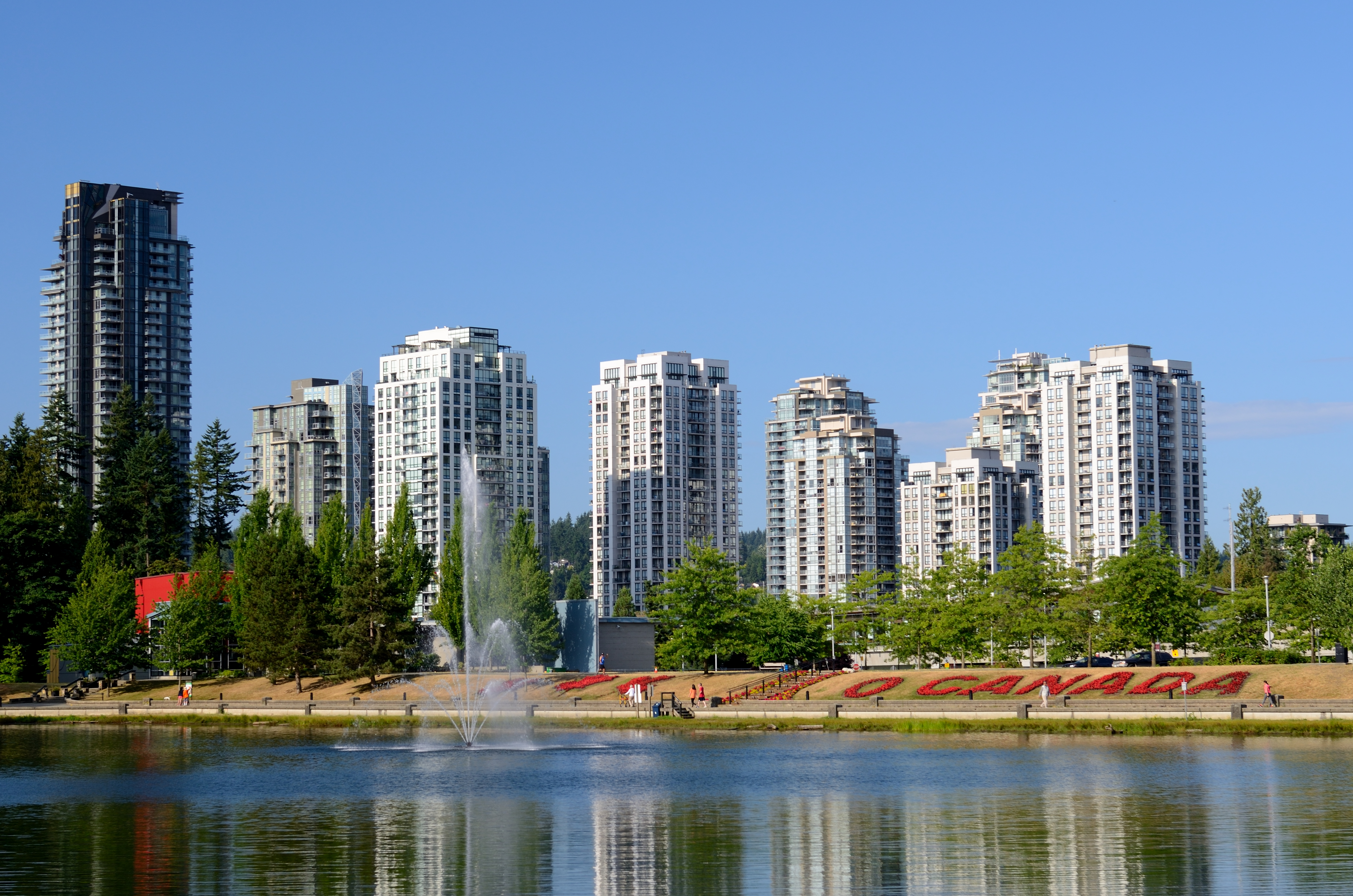

- Location within British Columbia
- Location: Coquitlam, British Columbia
- Coordinates: 49.287°N 122.7889°W
- Type: Artificial lake
- Basin countries: Canada
- Surface area: 5 ha (12 acres)
- Average depth: 4 m (13 ft)
- Max. depth: 8 m (26 ft)
- Surface elevation: 31 m (102 ft)

Lafarge Lake is a five-hectare, man-made lake located in Town Centre Park, in central Coquitlam, British Columbia, Canada. It was originally a gravel pit formed from gravel extraction from the 1950s until 1965. In the 1970s, the land was transferred to the City of Coquitlam, and a successful reclamation project ensued.

== Facilities and transport ==
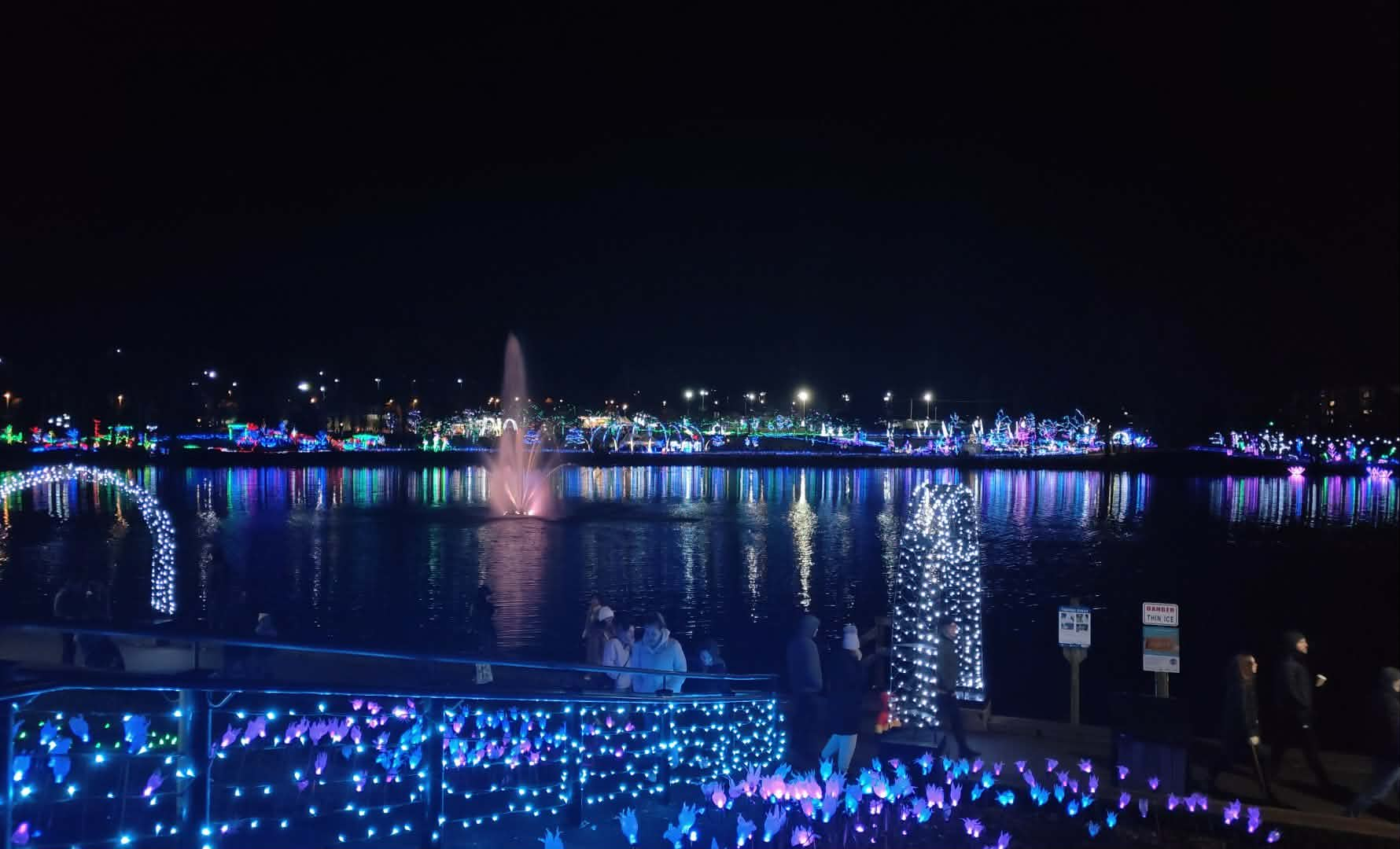
Lights at Lafarge Lake

Lafarge Lake is accessible through nearby Lafarge Lake–Douglas station of the Millennium Line.

The Evergreen Cultural Centre lies on the southwest corner of the lake and hosts events and exhibitions featuring the performing and visual arts.

Lights at Lafarge Lake is an annual lights event held from November to February.

== Fauna ==
The lake is home to many species of waterfowl, as well as beavers, common carp, brown bullhead, bluegill, and is stocked with rainbow trout in the spring and fall.

== See also ==
- List of lakes of British Columbia
