= Evergreen Cultural Centre =

Cultural centre in British Columbia, Canada

Coordinates: 49.285339°N 122.790644°W

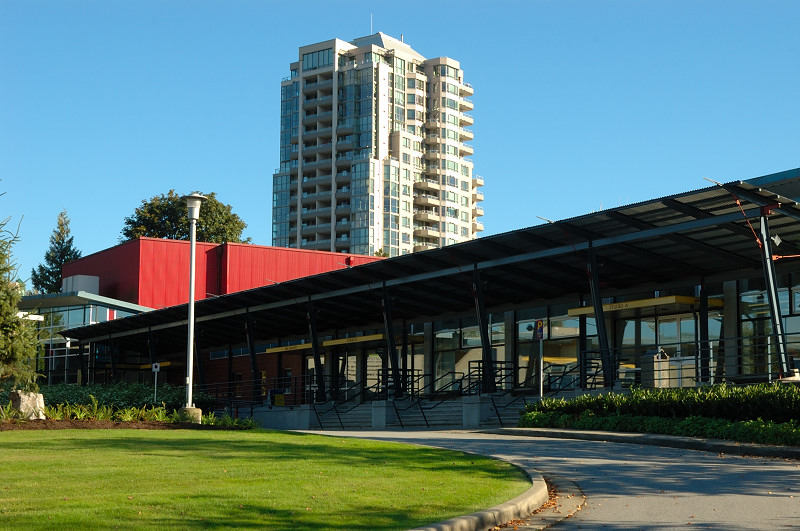
- Interactive map of Evergreen Cultural Centre
- Location: Coquitlam, British Columbia
- Owner: City of Coquitlam
- Seating type: General Admission or Reserved
- Capacity: 257
- Type: Black Box Theatre and Art Gallery

Construction
- Opened: October 1996

The Evergreen Cultural Centre is a community gathering place for performing and visual arts activities in Coquitlam, British Columbia, opened in October 1996 by former Coquitlam Mayor Lou Sekora. The design team was headed by Thom Weeks of Architectura, and the contract was completed by Proscenium Architecture.

The Centre features a 257-seat black box theatre (with configurable seating from stadium to flat floor), a fully equipped rehearsal hall, four art studios, and a 1,500-square-foot (140 m^{2}) art gallery. The Centre is owned by the City of Coquitlam and operated by the Evergreen Cultural Centre Society, a nonprofit organization. Evergreen Cultural Centre is located in Coquitlam's Town Centre Park, overlooking Lafarge Lake.

Programming at the Evergreen Cultural Centre includes live theatre, comedy, musical concerts, family programming, visual arts workshops, gallery programs, and more. The facility serves as the home theatre for the Stage 43 Theatrical Society, and is also part of the Arts Club Theatre Company circuit that brings popular plays to the venue. The Centre is the home venue for the Pacific Symphonic Wind Ensemble and the Coastal Sound Music Academy.

From 2009 to 2011, the Centre hosted the Water's Edge Festival, a 25-hour continuous music festival featuring hundreds of world music, jazz and traditional performers playing at up to seven different venues, as well as workshops, a lantern procession, and a midnight drum circle. The inaugural event took place on the same weekend as Coquitlam's Festival du Bois. The 2010 festival was moved two weeks later to avoid the conflict and decrease the chance for colder weather that hit in 2009.

A second 750-seat auditorium has been planned, but it has yet to be funded.
