= Acton Capital =

International venture capital fund

- Formerly: Action Capital Partners
- Type: Private
- Industry: Venture capital
- Founded: 1999; 27 years ago
- Founders: Christoph Braun, Paul-Bernhard Kallen, Jan-Gisbert Schultze, Frank Seehaus
- Headquarters: Munich, Germany
- Number of locations: Munich and Vancouver
- Products: Investments, Venture capital, growth capital
- Website: actoncapital.com

Acton Capital is a German venture capital fund, founded in Munich and investing in tech-enabled startup companies in Europe and North America.

== History ==
As one of the first venture capital funds in Europe, Acton Capital invested in startups of the early Digital Economy. The first investment was online auction platform Alando in Germany, acquired by eBay in 1999 for $43 million. In November 2019, Acton Capital announced the closing of its fifth fund "Acton V" at $215 million.

=== Investments and exits ===
Acton Capital's investment focus is on tech-enabled business models like platforms, software as a service (SaaS) or online marketplaces and in fields such as financial technology (fintech), mobility, healthcare and Direct-to-consumer or recommerce. Exited investments include online marketplace AbeBooks - acquired by Amazon in 2008, online retailer of pet supplies zooplus - IPO in 2008, luxury fashion platform mytheresa.com - acquired by Neiman Marcus Group in 2014, global online marketplace Etsy - IPO in 2015 and Canadian software developer Themis Solutions (´Clio`) in 2019 to US private equity firms TCV and JMI Equity. The current portfolio of Acton Capital includes Software as a service company Mambu, fintech iwoca from the UK, student jobs platform Zenjob, the global information service company AlphaSights both founded in Berlin and Canadian telemedicine platform Maple.

Acton Capital was part of a Series B funding round for German car subscription provider Cluno, acquired by British online car retailer Cazoo in February 2021 and early investor in the global core banking engine Mambu. The B2B Software-as-a-service company announced a $266mn funding round by Acton Capital Partners and US investment firms EQT, TCV and Bessemer.

In 2020, Acton Capital led the Series B round in London-based elderly care platform Elder Technologies Ltd., the Series A funding round in Paris-based logistics platform Convelio and is invested in UK based online car retailer Cazoo, that was listed on the New York Stock Exchange at a $7bn valuation in 2021.

In November 2023, Acton Capital announced the closing of its sixth Venture capital fund at Euro 225 million to invest in tech-enabled business models like legal technology, hybrid work, cyber security or AI-driven solutions.
