= Gordon Harris (urban planner) =

Canadian urban planner

Gordon Harris is a Canadian urban planner and President and CEO of SFU Community Trust. In his role at the Trust he provides leadership in the development of UniverCity, an award-winning sustainable community adjacent to Simon Fraser University on Burnaby Mountain in Burnaby, British Columbia.

Under Harris' leadership, UniverCity has received a number of major awards including: a 2012 City of Burnaby Environment Award, a 2012 Planning Institute of British Columbia Award of Excellence, a 2011 Canadian Institute of Planners Award for Planning Excellence, a 2011 Federation of Canadian Municipalities Sustainable Communities Award, and a 2009 Urban Land Institute Award for Excellence.

Harris, an independent planning consultant, was named to head SFU Community Trust in 2007. His expertise in urban–based economic analysis and land use planning and development earned him recognition by the Planning Institute of British Columbia, the Canadian Institute of Planners, the Economic Developers Association of Canada, and the International Council of Shopping Centres. His clients have included many of the most successful land developers, investors, and retailers in North America as well as some of Canada’s larger municipalities and senior government departments and agencies. His international work has included projects in the United Arab Emirates, Saudi Arabia, Bosnia, Montenegro, Guatemala and China.

A longtime advocate of sustainable development, Harris was an early supporter of Smart Growth BC and Canadian Business for Social Responsibility.

A popular lecturer on sustainable development, planning and economic analysis, Mr. Harris received a BA in Urban Geography from the University of Alberta in 1980. In 2009, he was elected to the College of Fellows of the Canadian Institute of Planners in recognition of his leadership in all aspects of the planning profession. He serves on the board of the BC Arts Council and is a member of the Planning, Design and Realty advisory committee of Canada’s National Capital Commission.
