= Bitpanda =

Austrian cryptocurrency broker

Bitpanda GmbH
- Type: Private
- Industry: Fintech
- Founded: Vienna, 2014
- Founders: Eric Demuth; Paul Klanschek; Christian Trummer
- Headquarters: Vienna, Austria
- Key people: Eric Demuth (Managing Director); Paul Klanschek (Managing Director); Lukas Enzersdorfer-Konrad (Deputy Managing Director)
- Services: Electronic trading platform
- Revenue: US$161.81 million
- Number of employees: 730 (2023)
- Website: www.bitpanda.com

Bitpanda GmbH is an Austrian company headquartered in Vienna. Bitpanda provides a cryptocurrency broker, commodities and securities trading, and ETFs via their website and mobile app. In 2021, Bitpanda achieved a valuation of over US$4 billion. The company was the first Austrian start-up to meet the criteria for unicorn status. The revenue was $98.66 million in 2022, and increased to $161.81 million the following year.

== History ==
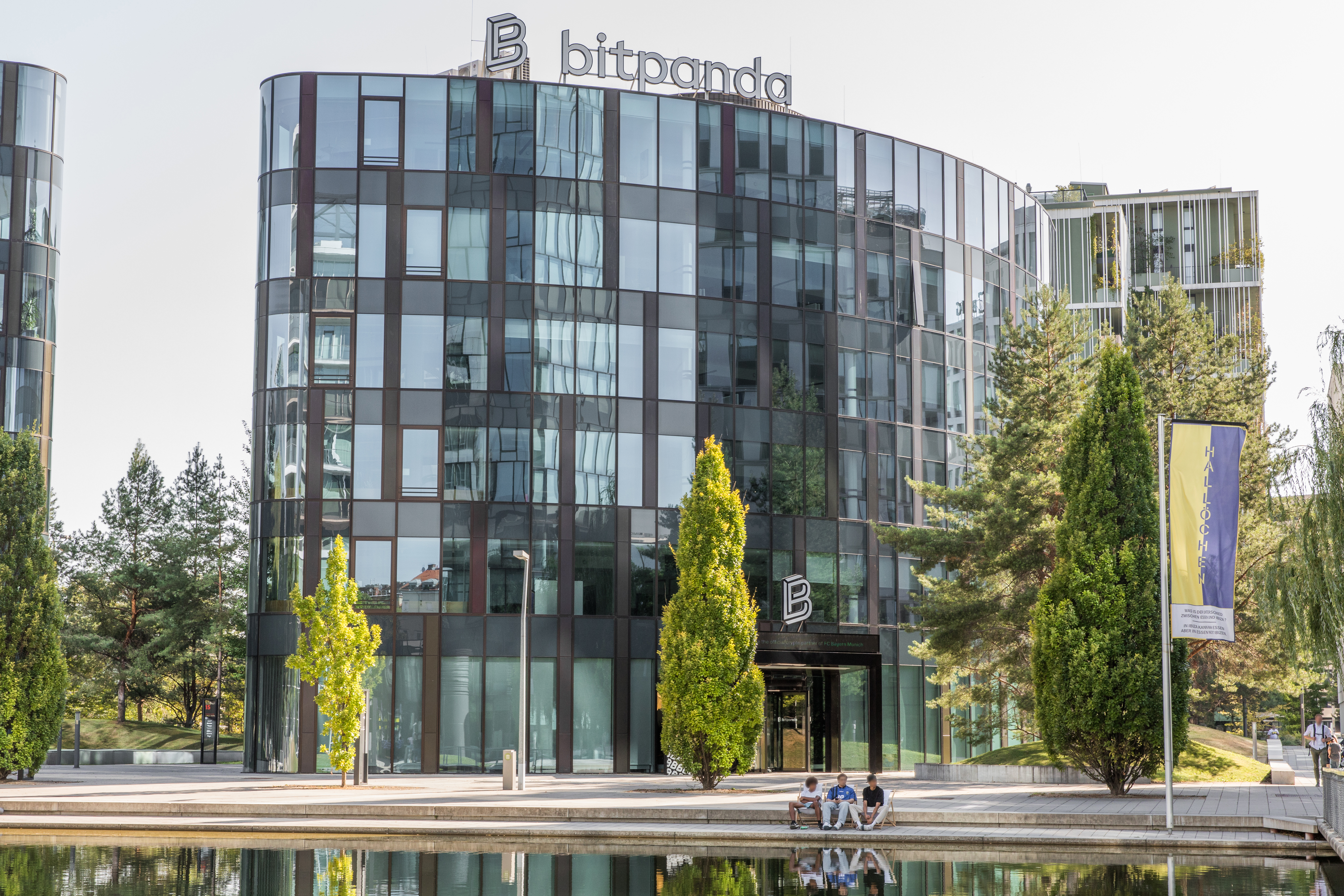
Bitpanda Headquarters in Vienna

=== Founding and Orientation ===
The company was founded in 2014 by Eric Demuth, Paul Klanschek, and Christian Trummer. In the early days, Bitpanda was a platform on which only cryptocurrencies were traded. Initially, the company operated under the name Coinimal GmbH, while the cryptocurrency trading platform was always known as Bitpanda. From 2017 onwards, vouchers for Bitcoins could be purchased at over 1,800 locations of the Österreichische Post, which could be redeemed on the Bitpanda platform. In 2017, 15 employees achieved a net profit of US$12.49 million, and processed transactions with various cryptocurrencies amounting to $672 million. In 2018, the company was renamed Bitpanda GmbH. In 2018, an office was opened in London.

=== Diversification of Services ===
In summer 2019, Bitpanda launched a token called Best, which offered a discount on trading fees for payments. In the same year, the company began integrating precious metal trading into its platform. In September 2020, the company raised $58.2 million in an initial funding round. Investors included Peter Thiel's investment firm. In a second investment round, Bitpanda raised a total of $160 million, increasing the company's valuation to $1.2 billion in March 2021. The main investors in this round were Valar Ventures and partners of DST Global. This made the company the first Austrian start-up to meet the criteria for unicorn status.

In early 2021, the company partnered with Visa to introduce a debit card that could be used to pay for goods and services in cryptocurrency or commodities in stores. In April 2021, it received a license for securities trading, allowing investments in fractional shares and ETFs. In another round of funding in August 2021, the company raised $263 million, increasing its valuation to more than $4 billion. In this latest round, Valar Ventures, Alan Howard, and Redo Ventures participated again, along with existing investors LeadBlock Partners and Jump Capital.

=== Cuts, Licensing, and Expansion ===
Due to overly rapid growth with numerous new hires and the 70% decline in Bitcoin's price, Bitpanda laid off 35% of its workforce on June 24, 2022. In July 2021, the company announced it would open an office in Berlin. By the end of the year, Bitpanda received a crypto license from the Federal Financial Supervisory Authority, which not only allows for the custody of cryptocurrencies but also enables proprietary trading with them.

Since 2023, Bitpanda has been operating a branch in the UK, and began a partnership with Coinbase to provide institutional clients with a regulated trading infrastructure. Additionally, the company invested $10.27 million in artificial intelligence development. Through a collaboration with N26 Bank, Bitpanda's cryptocurrency trading platform was integrated into the N26 app, allowing bank customers to trade over 200 cryptocurrencies via the app. Furthermore, since April 2023, Bitpanda has been partnering with Raiffeisenbank Niederösterreich-Wien, giving customers access to Bitpanda's cryptocurrency trading services through the bank's own platform.

Also since 2023, Deutsche Bank has served as the European bank for Bitpanda's cross-border services in Austria and Spain. In April 2024, Bitpanda announced a collaboration with Landesbank Baden-Württemberg (LBBW) to enable LBBW corporate clients to custody and procure cryptocurrencies. In early June, Bitpanda expanded its partnership with Deutsche Bank to offer real-time payments for incoming and outgoing transactions.

== Corporate structure ==
Since 2022, the Swiss Bitpanda Group AG has been serving as the parent company of Bitpanda GmbH. In addition to its executives, the company has a supervisory board consisting of three members. Bitpanda GmbH maintains investments and branches in Vienna, Berlin, Milan, Kraków, Bucharest, Amsterdam, Madrid, Barcelona, Dublin, and London. In the fiscal year 2023, 730 employees generated a revenue of US$161.81 million. Half of the company's workforce consists of programmers, while the remaining employees work in areas such as customer service, key account management, and human resources. By May 2024, Bitpanda GmbH had over 4.5 million customers, 25% of them in Germany. The subsidiary Bitpanda Technology Solutions provides financial institutions with the trading infrastructure developed for cryptocurrencies by Bitpanda. Clients include banks such as N26, Mambu, Lydia, Plum, Raiffeisenlandesbank Niederösterreich-Wien, and Landesbank Baden-Württemberg.

== Products ==
Through comprehensive regulatory licenses, Bitpanda GmbH is authorized to trade and custody cryptocurrencies for customers. These licenses extend across the entire European Economic Area. Through the electronic trading system Bitpanda, the company makes trading accessible for over 390 different cryptocurrencies on its website and mobile app, including Bitcoin, Ethereum, Tether, and Solana. In addition to cryptocurrency trading, Bitpanda offers investments in crypto indices, as well as short-term trading in the cryptocurrency market. Furthermore, the company offers trading in precious metals such as gold and silver, as well as stocks and ETFs. Bitpanda also provides a debit card in collaboration with Visa, for payments with cryptocurrencies, precious metals, and fiat currency. Additionally, the company operates the educational platform Bitpanda Academy.

== Sponsoring ==
In 2021, Bitpanda became the official global partner of the Davis Cup in men's tennis. At the beginning of 2022, the company formed a partnership with the Italian Rugby Federation, becoming the main and jersey sponsor of the Italy national rugby union team. Additionally, Bitpanda became a premium sponsor of the World Padel Tour, a sport derived from tennis. Since January 2024, there has been a strategic partnership as a crypto partner with FC Bayern Munich. At the start of the 2024 season, a partnership with the NFL commenced. In August 2024, Bitpanda became a sponsor of AC Milan. In January 2025, Eric Demuth, Bitpanda's founder and CEO donated €1.75 million to German political parties CDU/CSU, FDP, and SPD.
