= Parkcrest =

Neighourhood in Burnaby, British Columbia

Coordinates: 49.2726°N 122.9790°W

Aerial view of Parkcrest in 2026

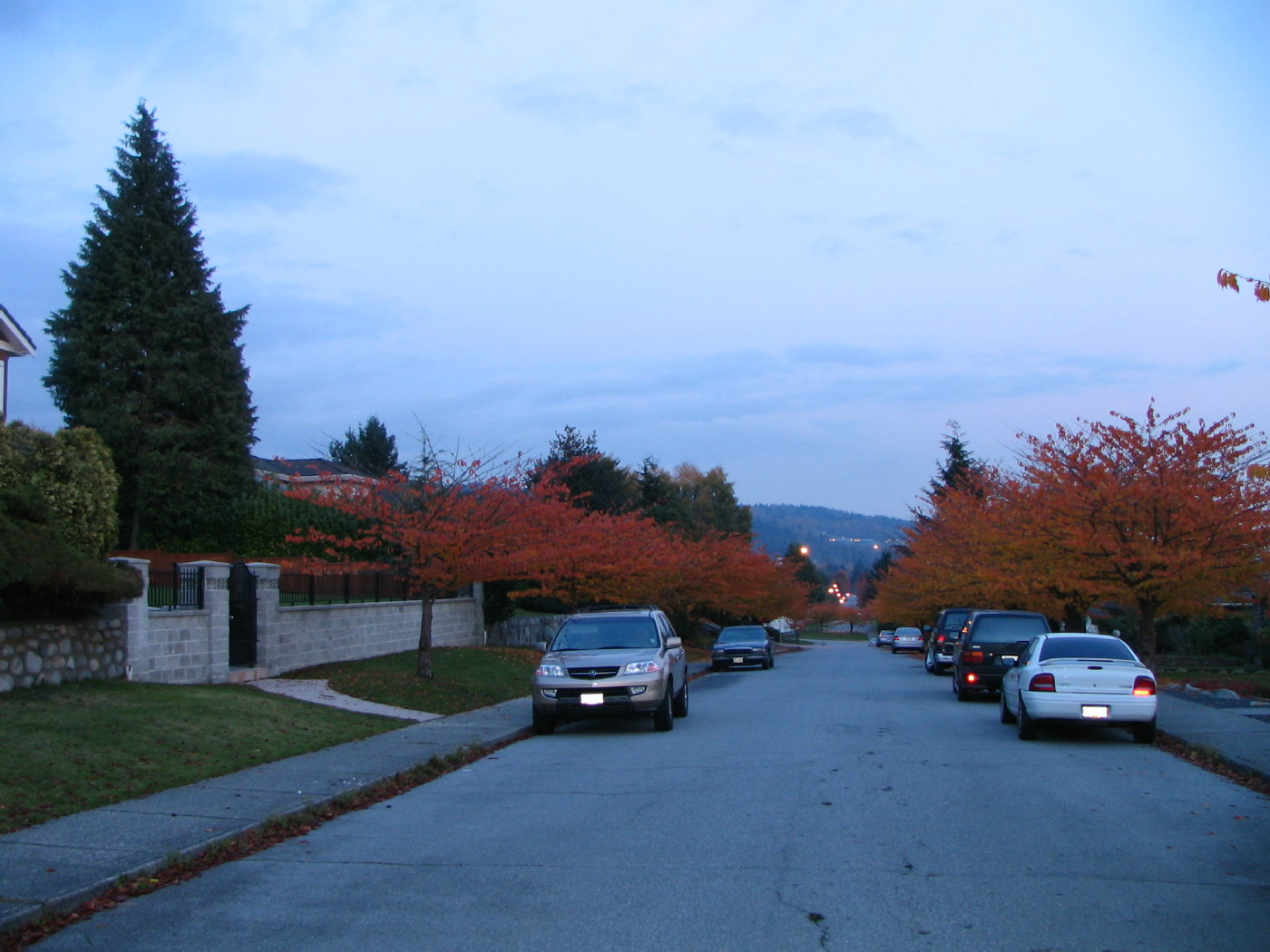
Fall colours at sunset on Charles Street

Parkcrest is a hillside neighbourhood in North Burnaby, British Columbia adjacent to Kensington Park which gave it its name. It has a long rectangular shape stretched north to south and is bounded by Springer Avenue to the west and Kensington Avenue to the east. To the north its border runs along Hastings Street, its southern border lies along the Lougheed Highway and Skytrain tracks. Its elevation gradually lowers to the south and ends up in Central Valley, quite low above the level of Burnaby Lake.

== Housing and amenities ==
Though some low-rise apartments exist, the housing is predominantly single-family. Real-estate prices reflect the status of North Burnaby as a prestigious, high-middle-class neighbourhood. There are two elementary schools at two opposite ends of the neighbourhood - Aubrey and Parkcrest. In terms of shopping, only a small strip mall is available and it is at the very bottom of the hill, along Broadway, though three large local shopping malls are all within a few minutes.

== Transport ==
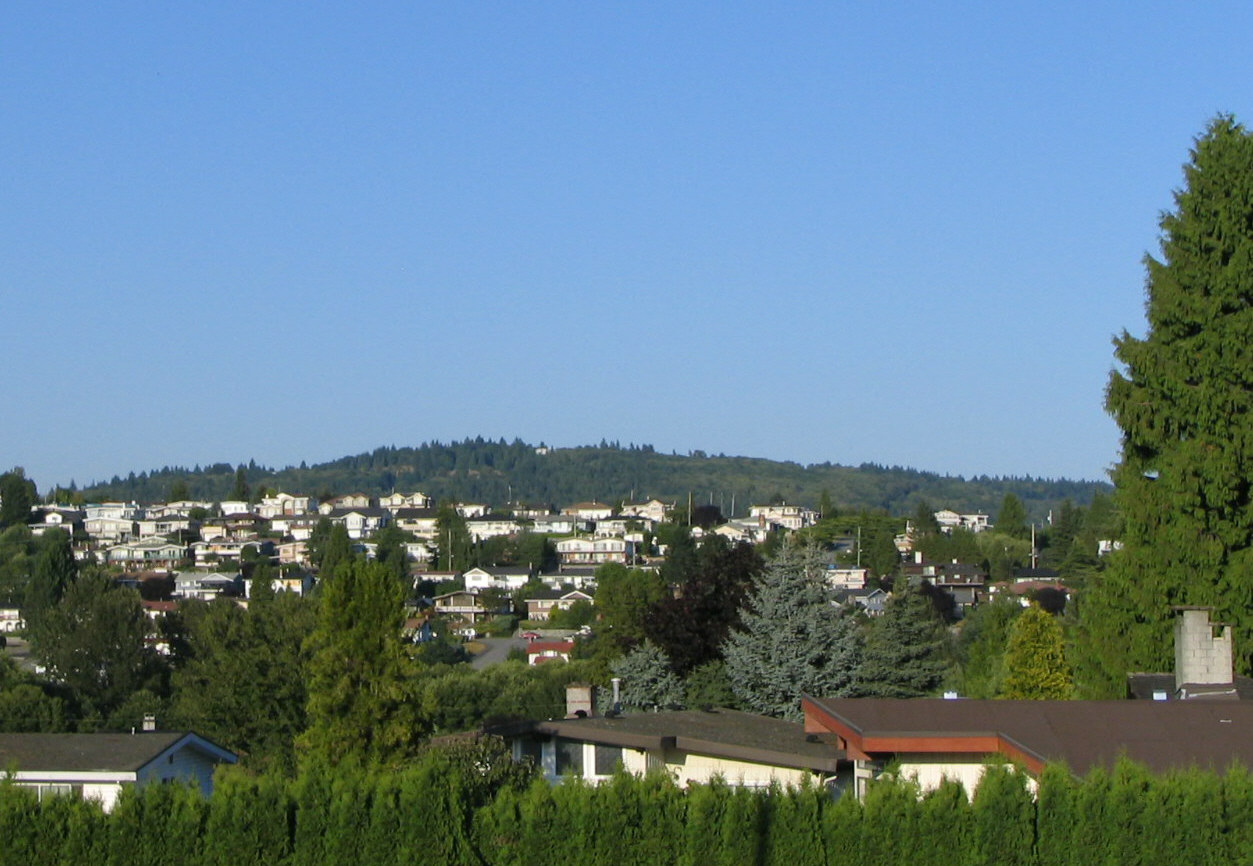
Parkcrest with Burnaby Mountain in the distance

The area is served by two bus routes (#134 and #136) connecting it to Brentwood Mall, Forest Grove and the Skytrain stations in the Lake City area. The closest Skytrain station is at the foot of Holdom Ave right by the Lougheed Highway.

== Ethnic flavour ==
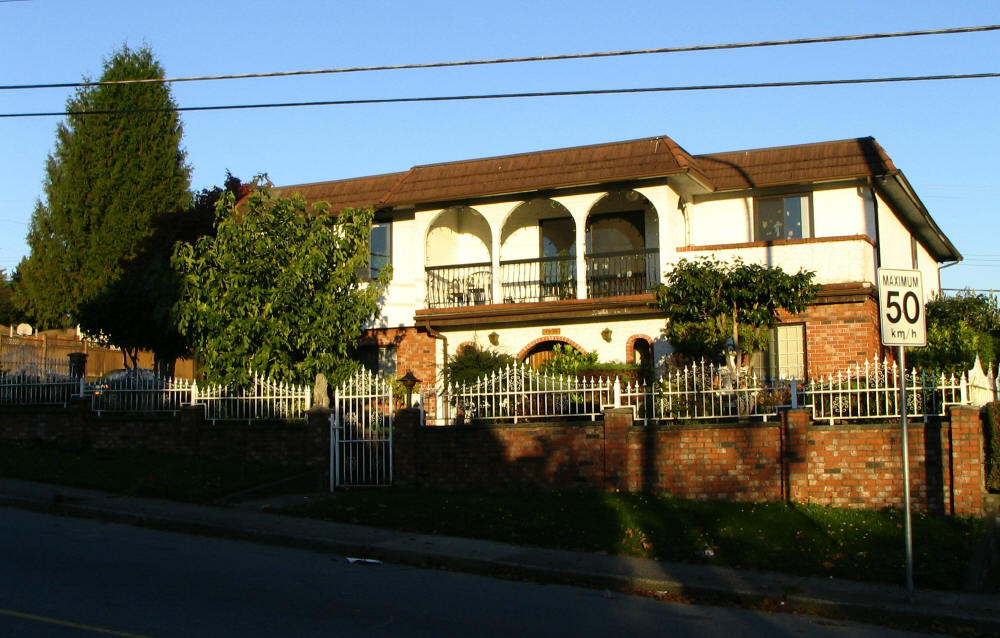
A typical Italian-style home, one of many that make North Burnaby so architecturally diverse

Being part of North Burnaby, the area has a distinct Italian feel to it as many homes were built to reflect certain Mediterranean-influenced architectural elements like arches, balconies and window shutters, with grape vines often decorating their façades. Most Italian-owned homes have backyard gardens with greenhouses for tomatoes and other southern plants, as well as traditional bean poles.

== Parks and activities ==
The biggest attraction is probably Kensington Park with its pitch and putt facilities and a nearby ice arena (off Curtis St) used for hockey and skating by local residents. Soccer and baseball are also played on nearby well-lit sports fields.

== Scenic viewpoints ==
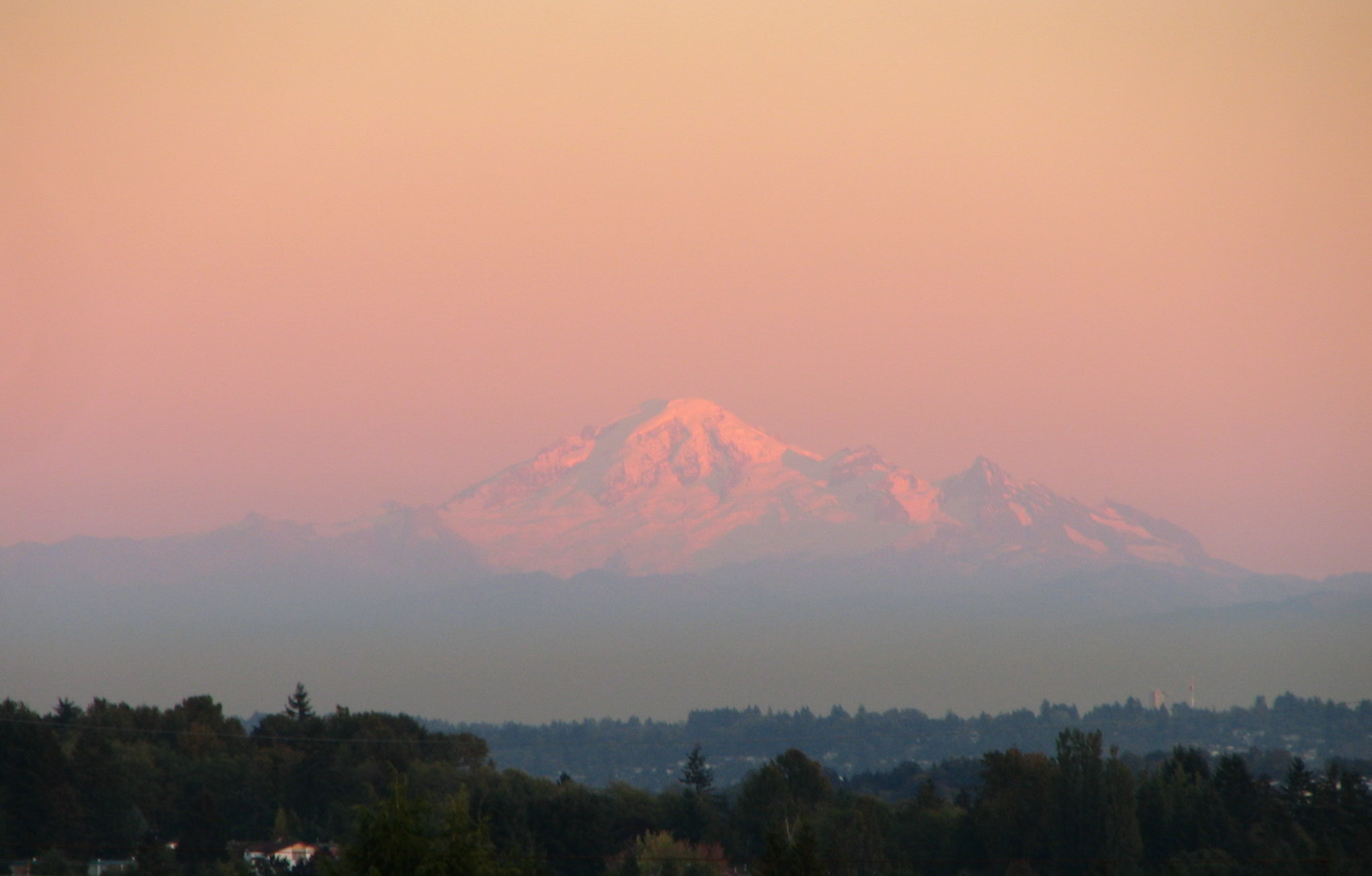
Mount Baker in Washington State at sunset

The playground at Aubrey Elementary occupies a high point offering panoramic views from the nearby wood-covered Burnaby Mountain to the distant Mt. Slesse, Tomyhoi, Larrabee, American Border Peak and Canadian Border Peak beyond Montecito in the east, to the snow-covered Mount Baker and Mount Shuksan in the south-east to Burnaby Lake, New Westminster, Glacier Peak and Metrotown in the south, to Downtown Vancouver and the mountains of Vancouver Island in the west with its highest peak Golden Hinde (British Columbia), and to the North Shore Mountains with Grouse Mountain, the Lions, Cathedral Mountain and Mt. Seymour in the north. Sunsets are amazing at any time of the year. Although the elevation is not as high as on Capitol Hill, Burnaby, it is still a good place to see the annual fireworks in late July and early August over English Bay away from the crowds and midnight traffic.
