= Burnaby Velodrome =

Velodrome in Burnaby, British Columbia

Harry Jerome Sports Centre
- The Bubble
- Interactive map of Harry Jerome Sports Centre
- Location: 7564 Barnet Highway, Burnaby, British Columbia
- Coordinates: 49.28905°N 122.94051°W
- Owner: City of Burnaby
- Field size: 200m oval track in a 53,000 sq. f. facility

Construction
- Built: 1991-1997
- Opened: November 1997
- Cost: $1,500,000 CAD

Tenants
- Burnaby Velodrome Club; Volleyball British Columbia

Website
- www.burnabyvelodrome.ca

One of only three indoor bicycle racing tracks in Canada, the Burnaby Velodrome is located in Burnaby, British Columbia. It is operated by the non-profit Burnaby Velodrome Club (BVC), and is an affiliated member of Cycling British Columbia. The track is located inside the Harry Jerome Sports Centre, which is also used by Volleyball BC for game play and administration purposes.

== History ==
Built between 1991 and 1997, the Burnaby Velodrome replaced the China Creek Velodrome, which was in operation from 1954 to 1980. The China Creek Velodrome was built for the Empire Games in 1954 and torn down because of the construction of Vancouver Community College's Broadway campus. The track surface and support structure were designed in part by the CTA Design Group, and cost approximately $1.5 million to build. The velodrome opened on November 17, 1997.

In October 2000, an engineering report was produced, which identified concerns about the roof structure and condition of the cycle track surface. The track was closed in May 2001, citing safety concerns by the risk manager for the City of Burnaby. In October 2001, the director of the Parks, Recreation and Cultural Services Department informed the Burnaby City Council that the BVC wanted to repair and upgrade the track. Cycling BC and the president of the Marymoor Velodrome supported the repairs and re-opening.

In April 2002, the BVC's plan was chosen from several competing proposals, including the removal of the track surface. Professional cyclist Alex Stieda and members of the public wrote in support of the BVC's proposal. In November 2002, the club re-opened and held a successful open house.

== Facilities ==
The velodrome is 6 meters wide and 200 meters long, with bankings of 47 degrees in the corners and 15 degrees in the straightaways. The track surface is a combination of strip planks and plywood sheeting. Riders must maintain a speed of at least 30 kilometres per hour (19 mph) in order to avoid falling off the track.

High-level cyclists who have trained or raced at the facility include Brian Walton, Tanya Dubnicoff, Lori-Ann Muenzer, and Mandy Poitras.

In 2000, the Burnaby Mountain Conservation Area was formed, which includes the land under the Harry Jerome Sports Centre. The Velodrome Trail (pedestrians only) starts just behind the HJSC. In 2006, a trail was cut between the Harry Jerome Sports Centre and the former gun club site to facilitate movement of emergency personnel attending to operations on Burnaby Mountain.

== Programs ==
In 2010, the BVC started the Aboriginal Youth Cycling program under the direction of program coordinator Kelyn Akuna. This program, the first of its kind, is a way for aboriginal youth to learn about track cycling.

In 2011, BVC President, Scott Laliberte, made a presentation to Burnaby City Council, stating that membership had increased for each of the past two years, and that a variety of training programs were in place.

The velodrome plays host to a variety of races every year, including the Feature Friday Night Race Series, the Burnaby 4 Day, and club races throughout the season. In the past, they have hosted the Junior and U17 National Track Championships, as well as the BC Provincial Track Championships. Visitors will need a UCI license to ride or race during their visit.

The velodrome also hosts a variety of youth camps, training sessions, and race clinics year-round. There are monthly sprint or time trial events as well.

In 2014, the club's redesigned logo by Jonathan Wood won a Communication Arts Typography award.

== Major competitions hosted ==
Year	Date	Event	Level
2014	December 27–30	Burnaby 4-Day Bike Race	Regional
2014	September 12–14	BC Provincial Track Championship	Regional
2014	November 21–24	National Junior and U17 Track Championship	National
2013	December 27–30	Burnaby 4-Day Bike Race	Regional
2012	December 27–30	Superior Glass 4-Day	Regional
2012	November 9–11	Superior Glass Track Classic	Regional
2010	December 27–30	Saputo Burnaby 4	Regional

== See also ==
- List of cycling tracks and velodromes
