= UniverCity =

- Urban Village
- UniverCity

- Interactive map of UniverCity
- Coordinates: 49.2790°N 122.9054°W
- Country: Canada
- Province: British Columbia
- District: Metro Vancouver
- City: Burnaby
- Established: 2001
- Elevation: 365 m (1,198 ft)

Population (2026)
  - Total: 5,000
- Estimated
- Website: UniverCity.ca

UniverCity is a community located on top of Burnaby Mountain, adjacent to Simon Fraser University in British Columbia, Canada. It is modelled as a sustainable community. UniverCity has won several awards for sustainable planning and development. As of 2026, it is home to over 5,000 residents.

== History ==
The groundwork for UniverCity was laid in 1963, when Arthur Erickson and Geoff Massey submitted their initial plan for Simon Fraser University. The mountaintop campus was designed to anchor a dense residential community. It took another 30 years before this implementation would begin, with Simon Fraser University agreeing to transfer more than 320 hectares of university-owned land to the City of Burnaby to more than double the size of the Burnaby Mountain Conservation Area. In return, the city approved an Official Community Plan (OCP) in 1996, allowing SFU to begin development of the residential community, later named UniverCity.

The OCP aimed to create a compact community surrounding the campus, with two districts, one to the south and the other to the east. The concept included different neighbourhoods with community facilities such as schools, parks, commercial core, pedestrian paths and biking trails. UniverCity was designed to accommodate up to 10,000 residents once completed, with SFU aiming to establish a more inclusive community on the mountain and also create an endowment fund to assist in further teaching and research for the campus.

In 2003, Simon Fraser University commenced construction on an area occupying approximately 200 acres (0.81 km^{2}) adjacent to the campus, atop Burnaby Mountain. By March 2015, approximately 4,000 people lived in UniverCity. An elementary school was opened, along with childcare facilities. Other developments included a supermarket and several residential complexes.

== Present ==
As of 2026, over 5,000 people live in UniverCity. The four neighbourhoods that make up the developing community are West Highlands, East Highlands, The Slopes and The High Street.

UniverCity's sustainability campaign is supported by the Province of British Columbia and the SFU Community Trust. SFU has partnered with Corix Utilities to develop sustainable energy systems for heating and hot water within the community.

Gordon Harris, FCIP is the president and CEO of SFU Community Trust, the organisation that oversees development of UniverCity.

== Awards ==
- Urban Land Institute's (ULI) Awards for Excellence: The Americas
- 2008 Best Practices in Affordable Housing award, Canada Mortgage and Housing Corporation (CMHC)
- 2008 LivCom Award
- APA 2008 National Planning Excellence Award
