= Capitol Hill, Burnaby =

Hill and neighbourhood in British Columbia, Canada

Capitol Hill
- Neighbourhood
- Aerial view of Capitol Hill and Confederation Park in 2026

- Location within British Columbia
- Coordinates: 49°17′13″N 122°59′07″W
- Country: Canada
- Province: British Columbia
- City: Burnaby
- Elevation: 203 m (666 ft)
- Postal code: V5B
- Area code: 604 / 778 / 236
- Website: City of Burnaby - Capitol Hill

Capitol Hill is a 203-meter-tall hill in the city of Burnaby, British Columbia, Canada, and also is the name of the neighbourhood spanning the summit of the hill. Standing on the north side of Hastings Street and bounded by Willingdon Avenue to the west and Fell Avenue in the east, this neighbourhood is known for its Italian, Portuguese, and Croatian expat communities, as well as being a student area associated with the nearby Simon Fraser University.

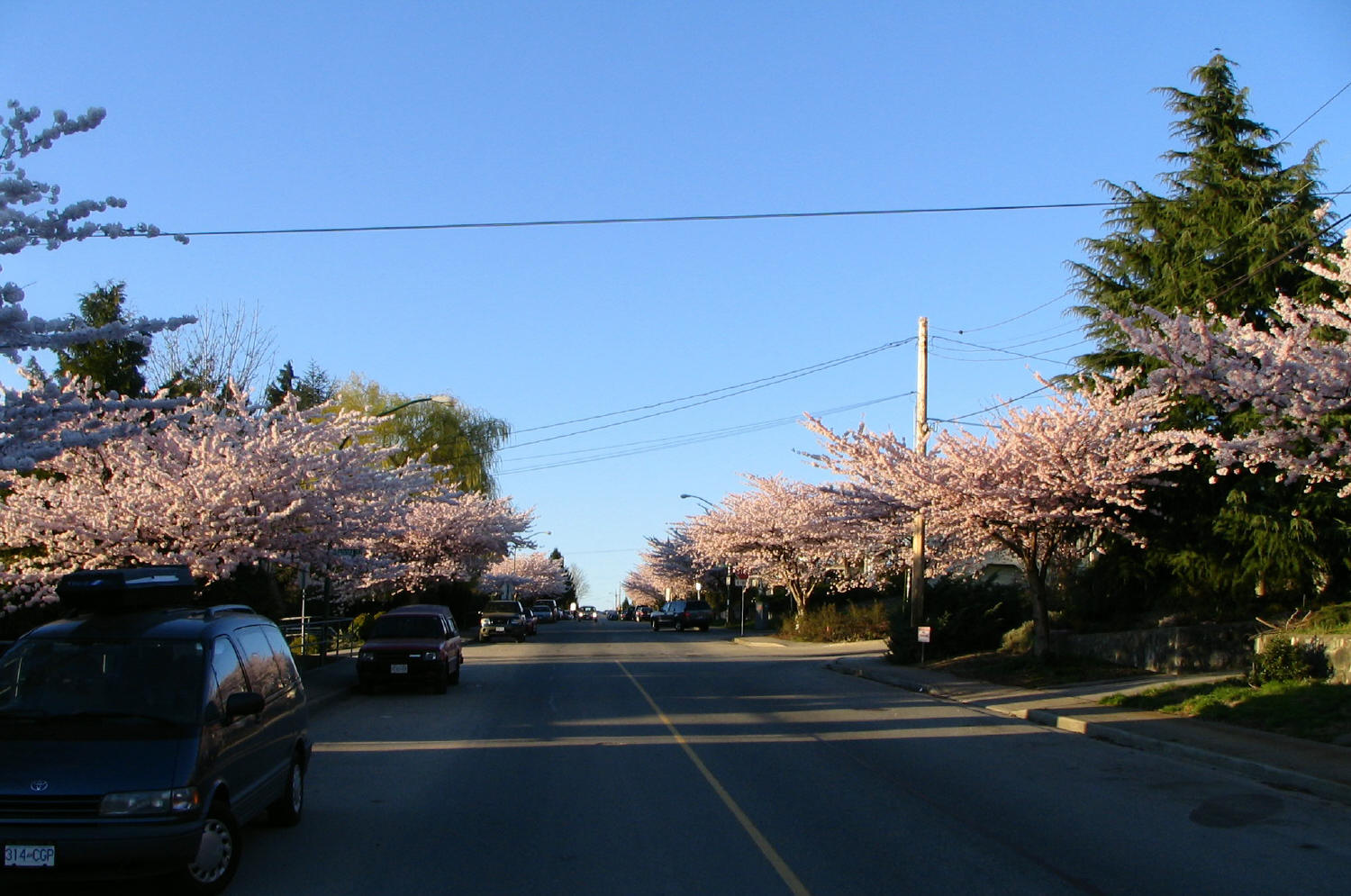
Spring on Capitol Hill

== History ==
According to the Greater Vancouver Book (Editor in Chief Chuck Davis), Capitol Hill was logged by early settler L.I. Dundas in 1902 who used oxen to transport lumber. Dundas Street is now a central arterial street in the neighbourhood, running east–west up one side of the hill and down the other.

== Housing ==
There are several apartment buildings in the area, mainly along Hastings Street and Holdom Avenue. Although the majority of housing is single-family, the size and value of land increases towards the top of the hill, as does the view of downtown Vancouver, the mountains and the water.

== Notable residents ==
One of Canada's most notable inventors, Donald Lewes Hings, lived at the peak of Capitol Hill. In 1937 he created a portable radio signaling system for his employer CM&S, which he called a "packset", but which later became known as the walkie-talkie.

One of Canada's most celebrated artists, Jack Shadbolt, was a Canadian painter who lived on Harbour View, an extension of Glynde Avenue on Capitol Hill.

Don Taylor is a Canadian television and radio sportscaster who grew up on Capitol Hill.

== Transport and amenities ==
Burnaby Public Library McGill Branch

The neighbourhood is served by a bus providing connections with the Burnaby Heights shopping district along Hastings Street, Eileen Dailly swimming pool, the McGill branch of Burnaby Public Library and Brentwood Mall to the south.

== Parks and trails ==
A walking trail constituting part of Trans Canada Trail skirts the northern flank of the hill.

A park near the end of Hythe Ave N., near Hythe's intersection with Cambridge, offers views of East Vancouver, Downtown Vancouver, Burrard Inlet with both the Lions' Gate Bridge and the Second Narrows Bridge (Ironworkers Memorial Second Narrows Crossing), the North Shore Mountains including The Lions, Bowen Island and Vancouver Island and is a common gathering spot for the locals to enjoy sunsets and watch the annual fireworks over English Bay in late July and early August. To the east, Capitol Hill has views of Indian Arm, Deep Cove, Burnaby Mountain, Mount Seymour, Golden Ears and Mount Baker.
