= Coat of arms of Burnaby =

Heraldic emblem of the city

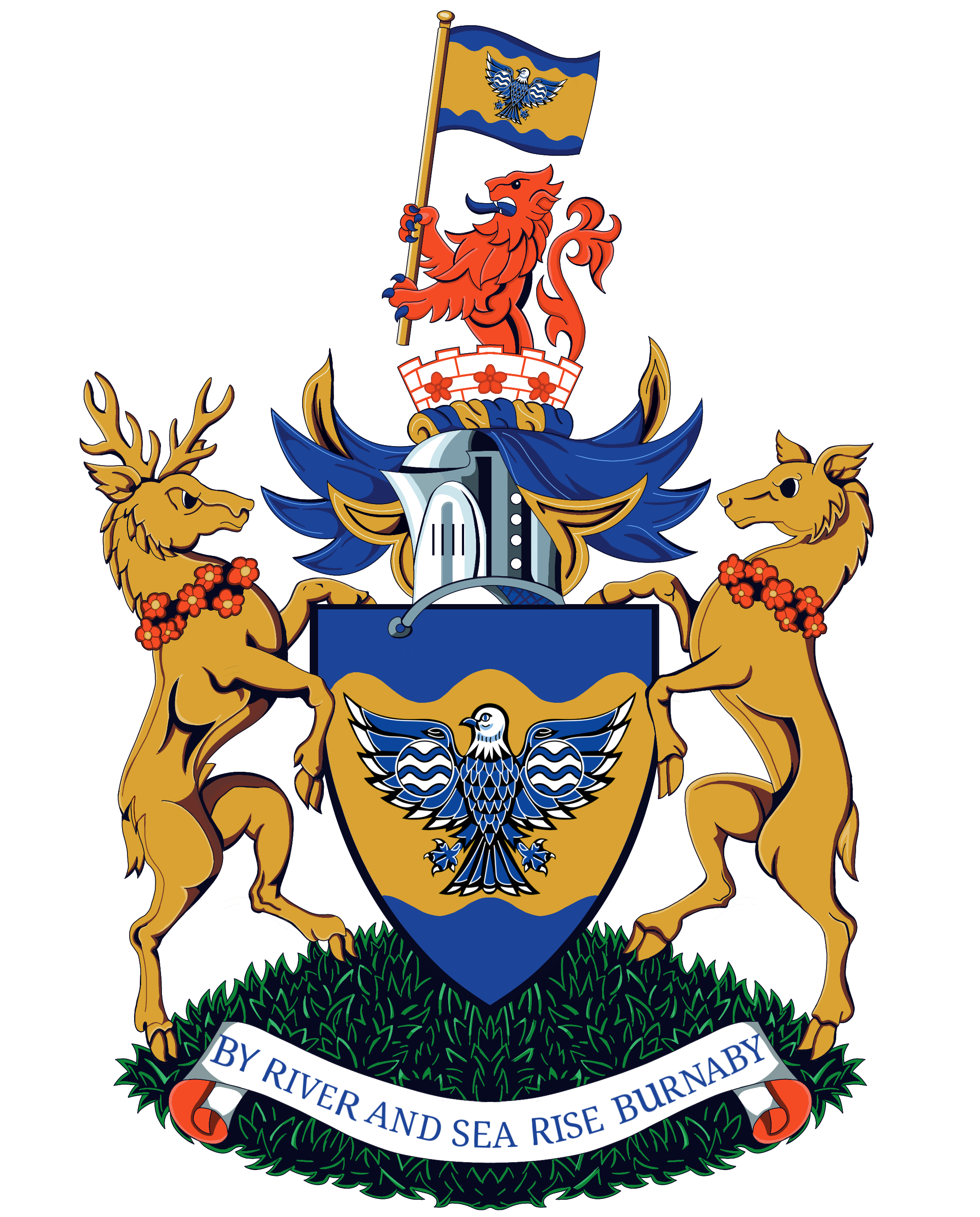
- Armiger: Mike Hurley, Mayor of Burnaby
- Adopted: 1991, re-confirmed 2005

The coat of arms of Burnaby was granted originally to the Corporation of the District of Burnaby by the Canadian Heraldic Authority in 1991, and then reconfirmed for the city of Burnaby in 2005 as the corporation's successor. The grant included the full coat of arms as well as a flag and a badge, both derived from the arms.

== Blazon ==
Descriptive; full blazon in infobox

Crest: Issuant from a mural coronet Argent masoned Gules charged with fraises in fess Gules a demi lion Gules armed and langued Azure bearing between the forepaws a staff Or flying a banner of the Arms

Shield: Azure on a Canadian fess wavy Or an eagle displayed Azure armed and tufted Argent charged on each wing with a fountain

Supporters: On a grassy compartment Vert dexter a stag Or gorged with a collar of rhododendron flowers Gules sinister a doe Or with a like collar

Motto: "BY RIVER AND SEA RISE BURNABY"

== See also ==
- Canadian heraldry
- National symbols of Canada
- List of Canadian provincial and territorial symbols
- Heraldry
