= Clio (software company) =

Software company in Canada

- Type: Private
- Industry: Legal technology
- Founded: 2007; 19 years ago
- Founders: Jack Newton; Rian Gauvreau
- Headquarters: Burnaby, British Columbia, Canada
- Number of employees: 1,000
- Parent: Themis Solutions Inc.
- Website: www.clio.com

Clio is a legal technology company headquartered in Burnaby, British Columbia. It offers law firms cloud-based software that handles various law practice management tasks including client intake, contact management, calendaring, document management, timekeeping, billing, and trust accounting.

== History ==
Clio was established in 2007 by Jack Newton and Rian Gauvreau. Clio launched the first cloud-based practice management software developed for law firms.

In 2012, Clio's Series B raised $6 million. The company made the first version of its Application Programming Interface available in 2012.

In September 2013, Clio released a mobile application that provides access to the company's software from iOS devices. The release occurred at the company's first annual Cloud Conference.

In 2014, Clio received $20 million in Series C funding from Bessemer Venture Partners, with participation from its initial investor, German-based venture capital firm Acton Capital Partners. Clio also announced the Android version of their mobile application and a major product update.

On October 5, 2018, Clio announced that it had acquired client intake software provider Lexicata and that the Lexicata product would be converted into a new product called Clio Grow. By this time, Clio also supported 120 integrations with other legal software applications.

One year later, in September 2019, Clio raised a $250 million Series D from TCV, JMI Equity.

On April 27, 2021, after several acquisitions in the legal technology space, Clio was valued at $1.6 billion with the announcement of a $110 million Series E funding round.

In July, 2024, Clio announced a $900 million Series F round.

On September 5, 2024, the Vancouver Canucks announced Clio as their inaugural away jersey sponsor, in a multi-year partnership with the company.

On November 2025, Clio announced the acquisition of vLex for $1 billion and announced a $5 billion valuation.

== See also ==
- Legal technology
- Law practice management software
