= Burnaby =

City in British Columbia, Canada

- City
- City of Burnaby
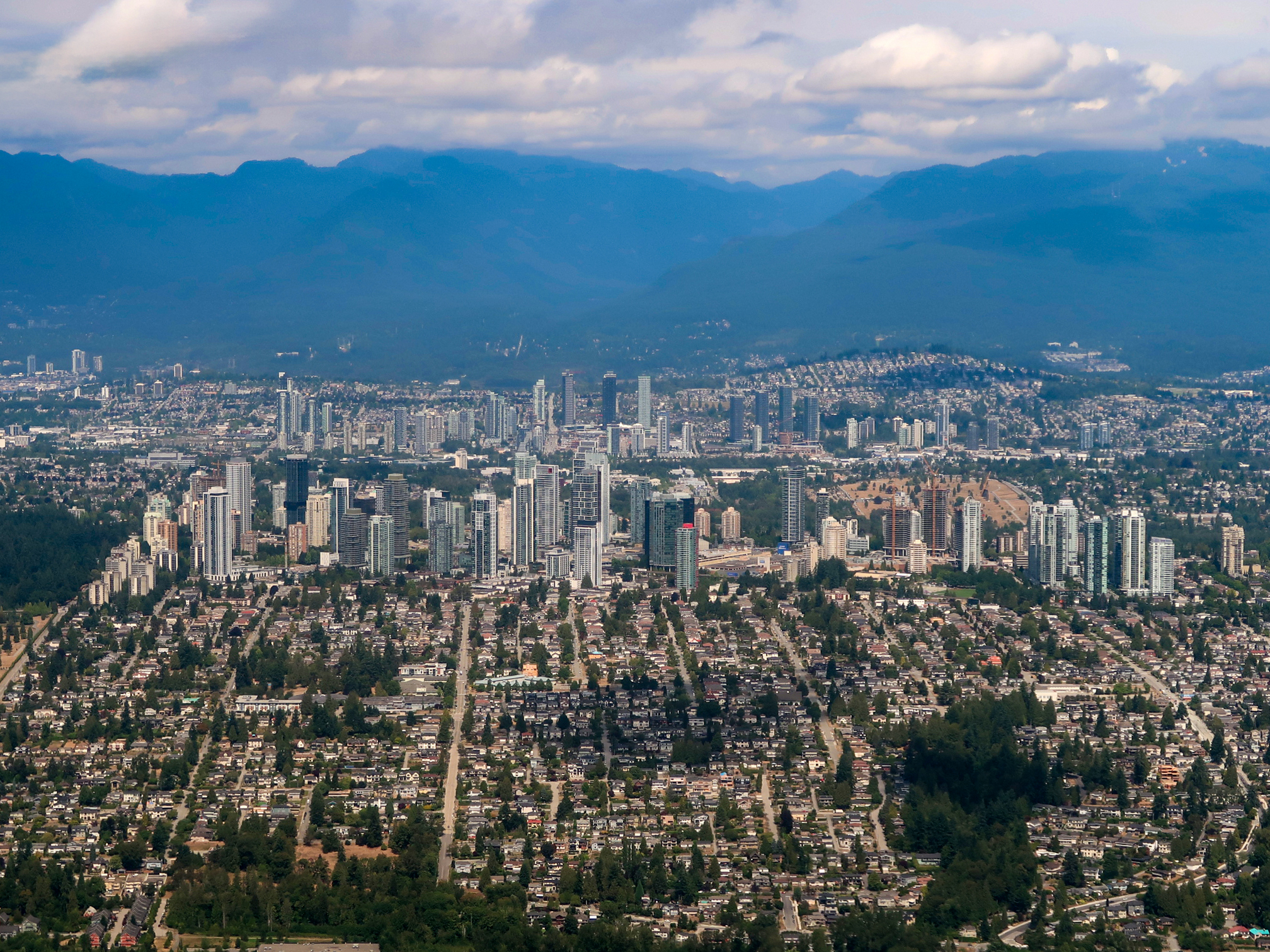
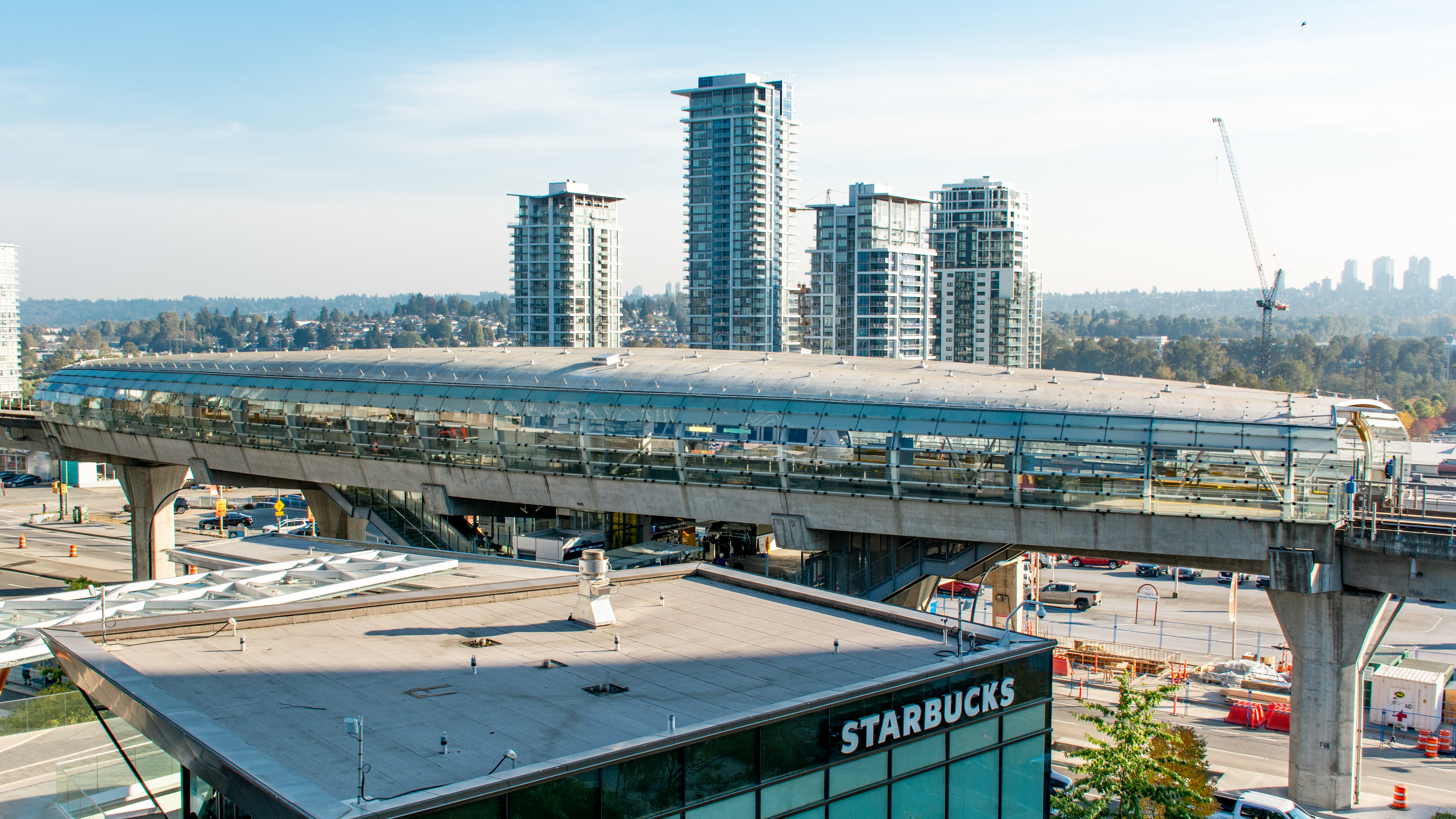
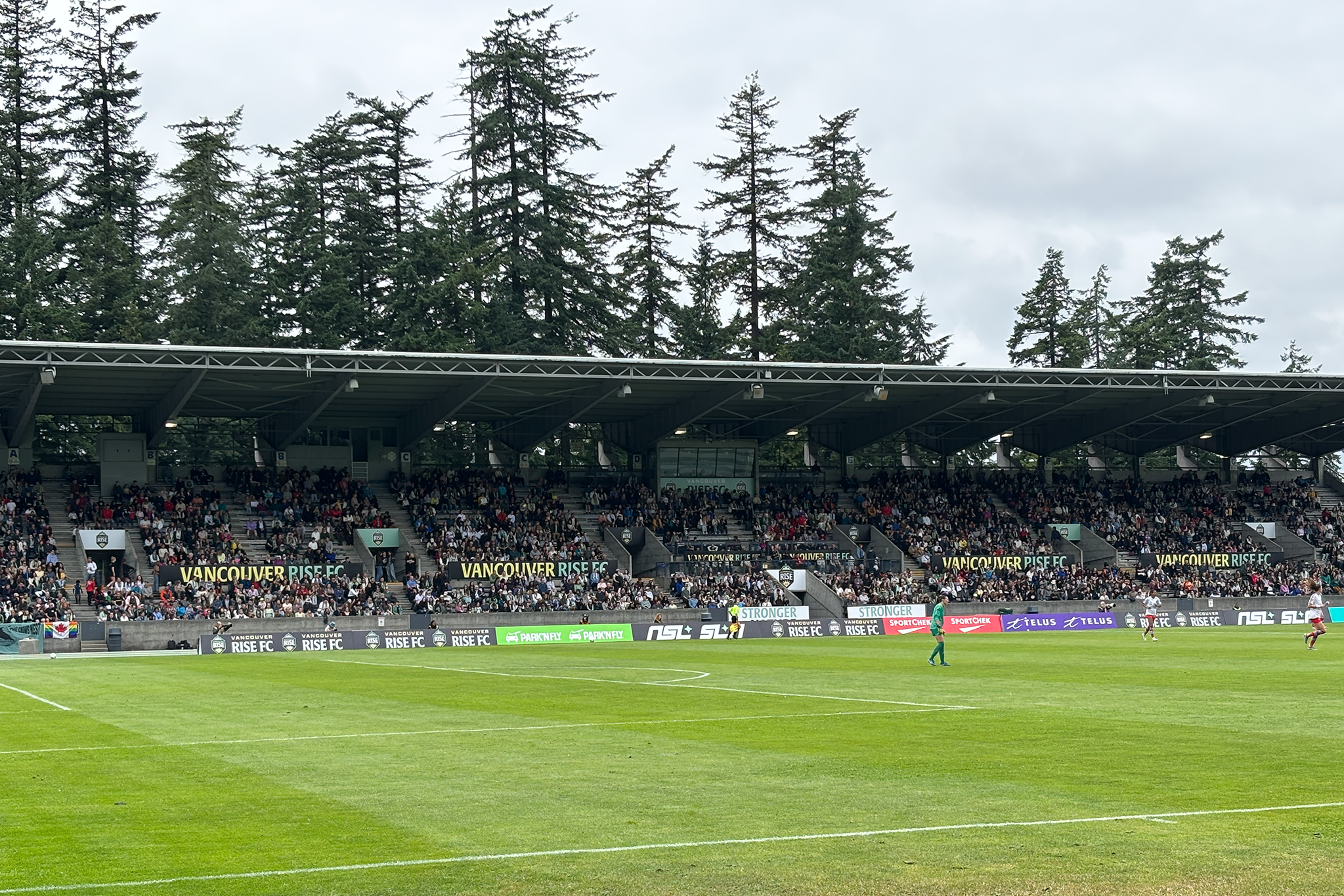
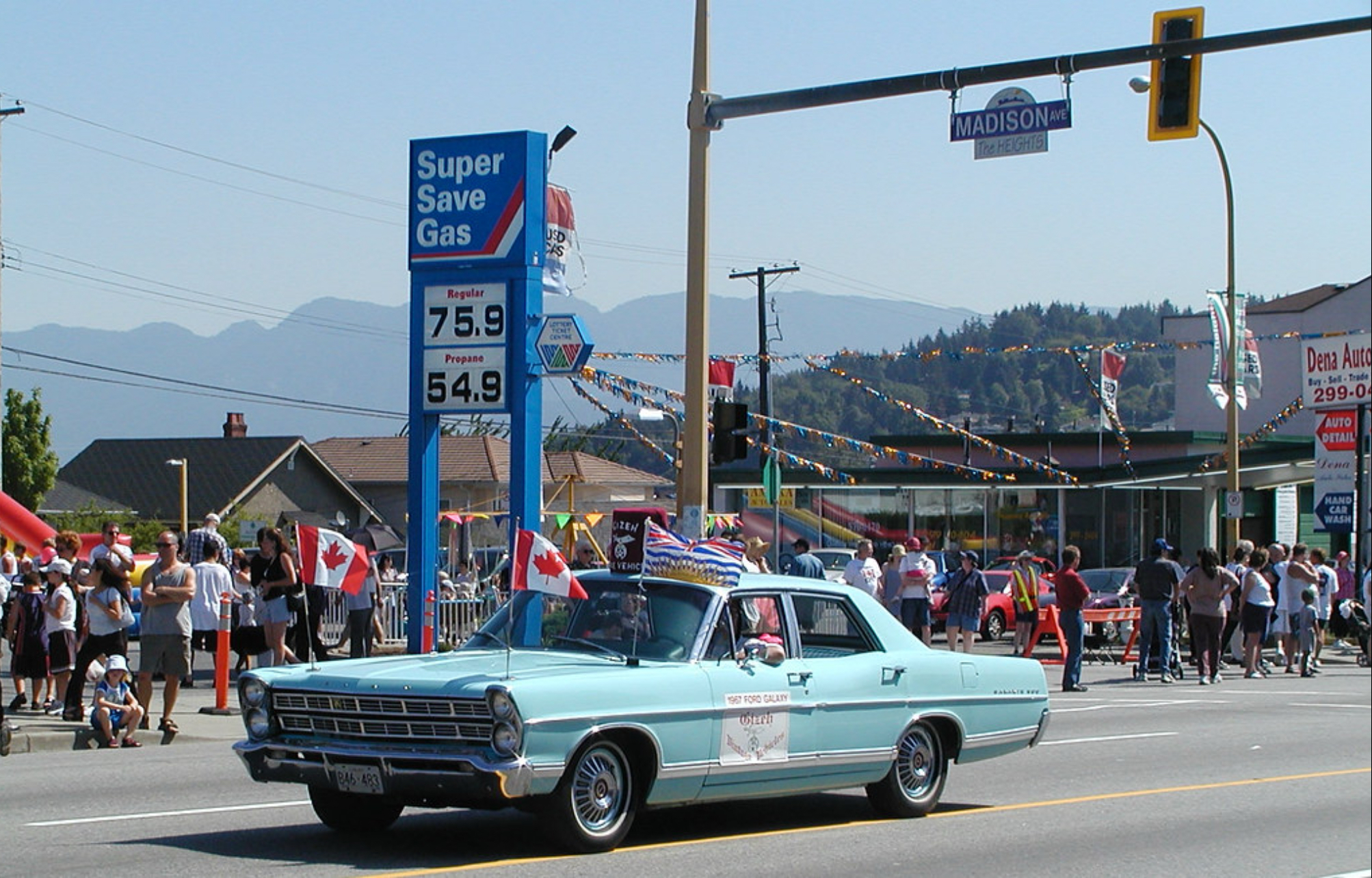
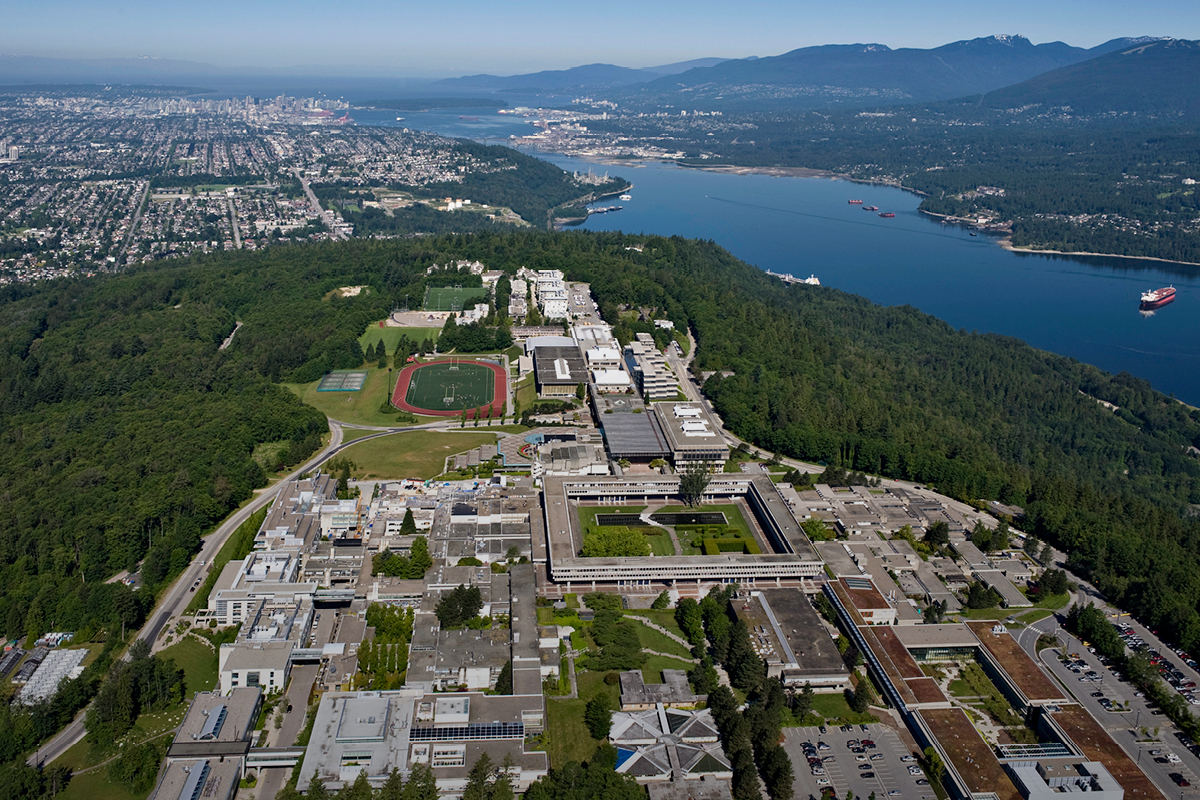
- Aerial view of Metrotown Brentwood Town Centre station Swangard Stadium at Central Park Deer Lake Hats Off Day parade at the Heights Simon Fraser University on Burnaby Mountain

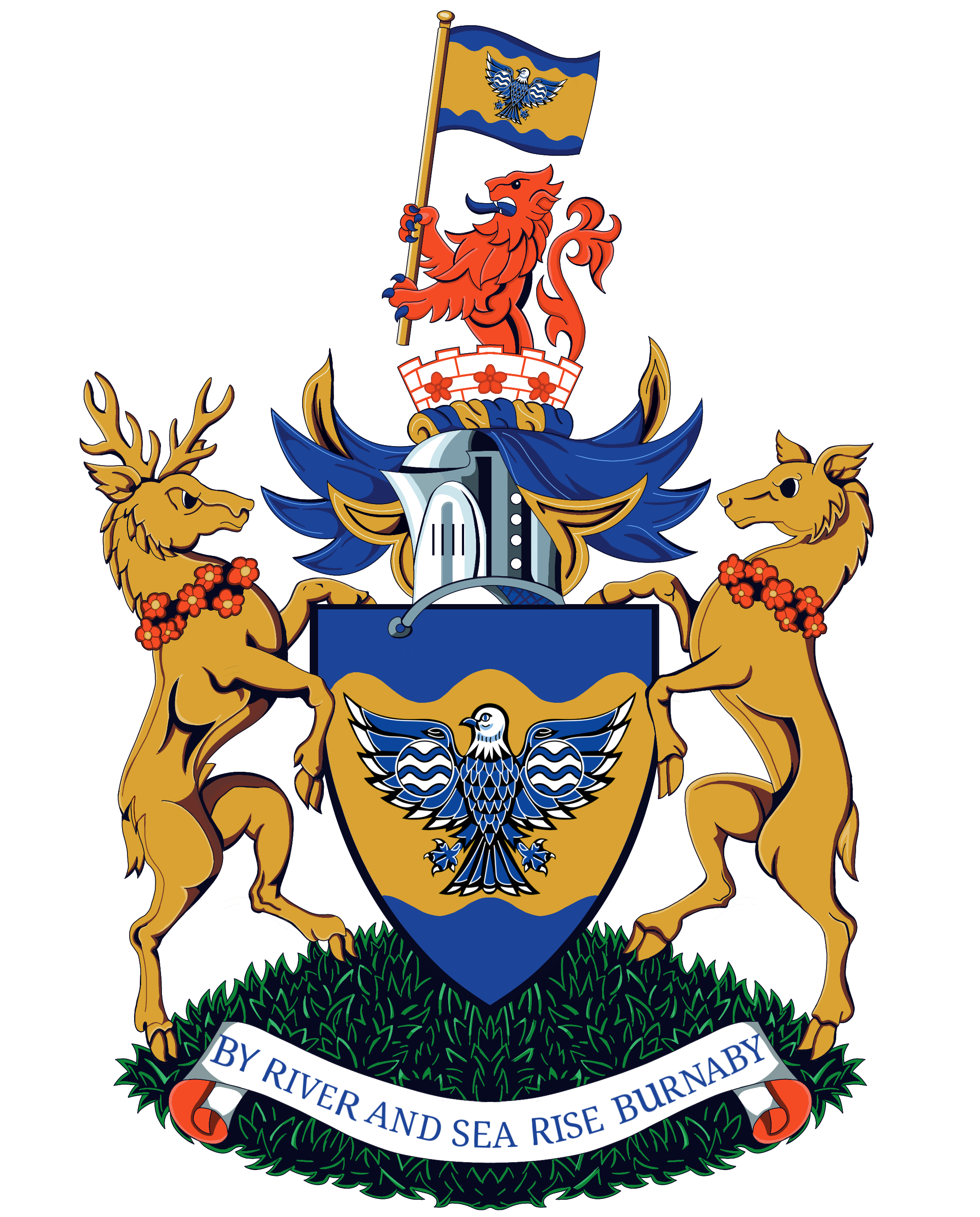
- Flag Coat of arms Logo
- Motto: "By River and Sea Rise Burnaby"
- Location of Burnaby in Metro Vancouver
- Coordinates: 49°16′N 122°58′W
- Country: Canada
- Province: British Columbia
- Regional district: Metro Vancouver
- Established: 1891
- Incorporated as a district municipality: September 22, 1892
- Incorporated as a city: September 22, 1992
- Named for: Burnaby Lake
- Seat: Burnaby City Hall

Government
  - Type: Mayor–council government
  - Body: Burnaby City Council
  - Mayor: Mike Hurley (Ind.)
  - City council: List of councillors: Pietro Calendino; Sav Dhaliwal; Alison Gu; Joe Keithley; Richard T. Lee; Maita Santiago; Daniel Tetrault; James Wang
  - MP: List of MPs: Terry Beech (Liberal) Burnaby North—Seymour; Wade Chang (Liberal) Burnaby Central; Gregor Robertson (Liberal) Vancouver Fraserview—South Burnaby; Jake Sawatzky (Liberal) New Westminster—Burnaby—Maillardville
  - MLA: List of MLAs: Joshua Domnich (CPBC) Burnaby Centre; Rohini Arora (NDP) Burnaby East; Raj Chouhan (NDP) Burnaby-New Westminster; Simon Chandler (CPBC) Burnaby North; David Xie (CPBC) Burnaby South-Metrotown

Area
  - Total: 96.6 km^{2} (37.3 sq mi)
  - Land: 90.57 km^{2} (34.97 sq mi)
- Highest elevation (Burnaby Mountain): 370 m (1,210 ft)
- Lowest elevation (Sea level): 0 m (0 ft)

Population (2021)
  - Total: 249,125
  - Estimate (2024): 298,978
  - Rank: 22nd in Canada; 3rd in British Columbia; 3rd in Metro Vancouver
  - Density: 2,750.7/km^{2} (7,124/sq mi)
- Time zone: UTC−07:00 (Pacific Time)
- Forward sortation area: V3N, V5A – V5C, V5E, V5G – V5H, V5J
- Area codes: 604, 778, 236, 672
- Website: www.burnaby.ca

Burnaby is a city in the Lower Mainland region of British Columbia, Canada. Located in the centre of the Burrard Peninsula, it neighbours the City of Vancouver to the west, the District of North Vancouver across the confluence of the Burrard Inlet with its Indian Arm to the north, Port Moody and Coquitlam to the east, New Westminster and Surrey across the Fraser River to the southeast, and Richmond on Lulu Island to the southwest. It has a population of 249,125 as of the 2021 census.

Burnaby was incorporated in 1892 and achieved its city status in 1992. A member municipality of Metro Vancouver, it is British Columbia's third-largest city by population (after Vancouver and Surrey), and is the seat of Metro Vancouver's regional district government. 25% of Burnaby's land is designated as parks and open spaces, one of the highest in North America.

The main campuses of Simon Fraser University and the British Columbia Institute of Technology are located in Burnaby. It is home to high-tech companies such as Ballard Power (fuel cell), Clio (legal software), D-Wave (quantum computing), and EA Vancouver. Burnaby's Metropolis at Metrotown is the largest mall in British Columbia, the third most visited in Canada and the fifth largest in the nation. Canada's largest film and television production studio and more than 60% of BC's sound stages are in Burnaby, contributing to the growth of Hollywood North.

The city is served by SkyTrain's Expo Line and Millennium Line. Metrotown station in Metrotown is the busiest station on weekends and the second-busiest on weekdays in regional Vancouver's urban transit system as of 2021.

== History ==
=== Pre-colonial (before 1850) ===
Early inhabitants were the Halkomelem- and Squamish-speaking Coast Salish Nations. Local landmarks such as Burnaby Mountain, Deer Lake, and Brunette River feature prominently in Indigenous history passed down through oral traditions. The northern shorelines of Burnaby, along the second narrows of Burrard Inlet was the site of an ancient battle between the attacking Lekwiltok and the defending Musqueam according to Chief Charlie Qiyəplenəxw.

The Coast Salish people living in BC and Washington state numbered more than 100,000 people, a level of population density supported by agriculture in other geographies. Techniques to preserve and store surplus food sustained a hierarchical society. Burnaby's marshlands along its rivers and lakes were cranberry harvesting areas for numerous villages, some numbering over 1,000 residents. Indigenous people travelled through Burnaby to reach the mouth of Brunette and Fraser River for the bountiful fishing seasons, eulachon in the spring and sockeye salmon in the late summer. Early European explorers and fur traders introduced diseases that decimated the Indigenous population. This false appearance of Burnaby as a vast open space, along with traditional Indigenous farming techniques which did not permanently alter the landscape, meant Indigenous land in Burnaby was mislabelled as terra nullius.

=== Incorporation (1850–1990) ===
The Fraser Canyon Gold Rush of 1858, the first of many gold rushes in British Columbia, brought over 30,000 fortune seekers, including many American miners. The fear of an impending annexation by the United States led to the creation of the Colony of British Columbia in 1858 and the establishment of New Westminster as its capital.

Settlers in Burnaby acquired land through a process called pre-emption which allowed people to claim a piece of land by clearing forests and building houses. Indigenous people were excluded from pre-emption. Royal Engineers dispossessed land from Indigenous people with the assistance of military force including the original routes of North Road, Kingsway, Canada Way, and Marine Drive. Logging permits given to settlers destroyed the forests of southern Burnaby which had provided vital sustenance for Indigenous people.

The City of Burnaby is named after Burnaby Lake, in turn named after Robert Burnaby, who was a Freemason, explorer, and legislator. He was previously private secretary to Colonel Richard Moody, the first land commissioner for the Colony of British of Columbia. In 1859, Burnaby surveyed a freshwater lake in the city's geographic centre. Moody named it Burnaby Lake.

Burnaby was established in 1891 and incorporated a year later in 1892. In the same year, the interurban tram connecting Vancouver, Burnaby, and New Westminster began construction.

=== Recent ===
The expanding urban centres of Vancouver and New Westminster influenced the growth of Burnaby. It developed as an agricultural area supplying nearby markets. Later, it evolved into an important transportation corridor between Vancouver, the Fraser Valley and the Interior. The introduction of the Skytrain's Expo Line cemented this trend into the 21st century.

As Vancouver expanded and became a metropolis, Burnaby was one of the first-tier suburbs of Vancouver, along with North Vancouver and Richmond. During the suburbanization of Burnaby, "Mid-Century Vernacular" homes were built by the hundreds to satisfy demand by new residents. The establishment of British Columbia Institute of Technology (BCIT) in 1960 and Simon Fraser University (SFU) in 1965 helped Burnaby gradually become more urban in character. In 1992, one hundred years after its incorporation, Burnaby officially became a city.

Since the 1970s, Burnaby has seen a decline in resource sectors and a subsequent rise of high value-added services and technology sectors. The presence of BCIT and SFU promoted research & development in the area. For example, manufacturing plants near Still Creek closed in the late 1970s, only to reopen few years later as film production studios. The continued expansion of media production in Burnaby contributed to Hollywood North.

== Geography and land use ==
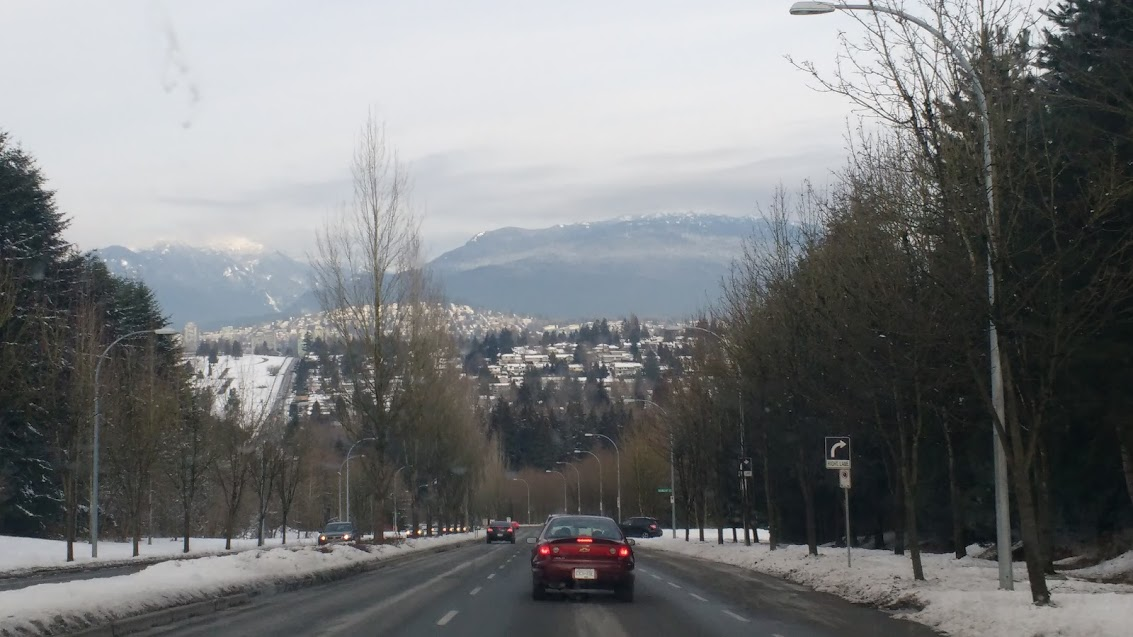
Central Burnaby, Capitol Hill and the North Shore mountains, as seen from Deer Lake Park

Burnaby occupies 96.6 square kilometres (37.3 sq mi) and is located at the geographic centre of the Metro Vancouver Regional District. The city has four areas of urban density known as "town centres": Lougheed, Edmonds, Metrotown, and Brentwood. The city's governmental and cultural precincts are located in Burnaby's Deer Lake area. Situated between the city of Vancouver on the west and Port Moody, Coquitlam, and New Westminster on the east, Burnaby is bounded by Burrard Inlet and the Fraser River on the north and south, respectively. Burnaby, Vancouver and New Westminster collectively occupy the major portion of the Burrard Peninsula. The elevation of Burnaby ranges from sea level to a maximum of 370 metres (1,214 ft) atop Burnaby Mountain. Due to its elevation, the city of Burnaby typically has more snowfall during the winter months than nearby Vancouver or Richmond. Overall, the physical landscape of Burnaby is one of hills, ridges, valleys and an alluvial plain.

Burnaby is home to many industrial and commercial firms. British Columbia's largest (and Canada's second largest) commercial shopping mall, Metropolis at Metrotown, is located in Burnaby, as well as malls in Brentwood and Lougheed town centres. Still, Burnaby's ratio of park land to residents is one of the highest in North America. It also maintains some agricultural land, particularly along the Fraser foreshore flats in the Big Bend neighbourhood along its southern perimeter.

=== Parks, rivers, and lakes ===
Major parklands and waterways in Burnaby include Central Park, Robert Burnaby Park, Kensington Park, Burnaby Mountain, Still Creek, the Brunette River, Burnaby Lake, Deer Lake, Squint Lake, and Barnet Marine Park.

=== Climate ===
Burnaby's Simon Fraser University weather station is located 365 metres (1,198 ft) above sea level on Burnaby Mountain. Therefore, climate records are cooler and wetter, with more snowfall, as compared to the rest of the city.

Burnaby has an oceanic climate (Cfb) with mild, dry summers and cool, rainy winters.

Climate data for Burnaby (Simon Fraser University) 1981–2010 at 365 metres
Month	Jan	Feb	Mar	Apr	May	Jun	Jul	Aug	Sep	Oct	Nov	Dec	Year
Record high °C (°F)	16.5 (61.7)	18.5 (65.3)	23.0 (73.4)	28.0 (82.4)	33.0 (91.4)	31.1 (88.0)	34.0 (93.2)	33.9 (93.0)	34.5 (94.1)	26.5 (79.7)	19.4 (66.9)	16.1 (61.0)	34.5 (94.1)
Mean daily maximum °C (°F)	5.8 (42.4)	6.8 (44.2)	9.3 (48.7)	12.4 (54.3)	15.6 (60.1)	18.2 (64.8)	21.2 (70.2)	21.2 (70.2)	18.0 (64.4)	12.0 (53.6)	7.5 (45.5)	5.1 (41.2)	12.7 (54.9)
Daily mean °C (°F)	3.6 (38.5)	4.3 (39.7)	6.2 (43.2)	8.7 (47.7)	11.8 (53.2)	14.4 (57.9)	17.0 (62.6)	17.2 (63.0)	14.6 (58.3)	9.5 (49.1)	5.3 (41.5)	2.9 (37.2)	9.6 (49.3)
Mean daily minimum °C (°F)	1.4 (34.5)	1.7 (35.1)	3.1 (37.6)	4.9 (40.8)	7.9 (46.2)	10.5 (50.9)	12.7 (54.9)	13.2 (55.8)	11.1 (52.0)	7.0 (44.6)	3.0 (37.4)	0.8 (33.4)	6.5 (43.7)
Record low °C (°F)	−13.9 (7.0)	−14 (7)	−8 (18)	−3.3 (26.1)	−0.5 (31.1)	3.9 (39.0)	5.0 (41.0)	3.3 (37.9)	2.0 (35.6)	−7 (19)	−14 (7)	−19.4 (−2.9)	−19.4 (−2.9)
Average precipitation mm (inches)	280.9 (11.06)	178.4 (7.02)	182.1 (7.17)	154.4 (6.08)	120.0 (4.72)	101.4 (3.99)	64.7 (2.55)	64.5 (2.54)	92.2 (3.63)	210.1 (8.27)	311.6 (12.27)	249.8 (9.83)	2,009.9 (79.13)
Average rainfall mm (inches)	256.5 (10.10)	163.2 (6.43)	171.2 (6.74)	152.7 (6.01)	119.9 (4.72)	101.4 (3.99)	64.7 (2.55)	64.5 (2.54)	92.2 (3.63)	209.8 (8.26)	303.6 (11.95)	220.8 (8.69)	1,920.7 (75.62)
Average snowfall cm (inches)	24.3 (9.6)	15.1 (5.9)	10.9 (4.3)	1.7 (0.7)	0.1 (0.0)	0.0 (0.0)	0.0 (0.0)	0.0 (0.0)	0.0 (0.0)	0.2 (0.1)	8.0 (3.1)	29.0 (11.4)	89.3 (35.2)
Average precipitation days (≥ 0.2 mm)	20.5	16.2	18.9	16.1	14.9	13.5	7.4	6.8	10.3	17.1	21.6	19.8	183.1
Average rainy days (≥ 0.2 mm)	18.1	14.7	18.3	16.0	14.9	13.5	7.4	6.8	10.3	17.0	21.0	17.3	175.4
Average snowy days (≥ 0.2 cm)	4.0	2.5	2.0	0.54	0.04	0.0	0.0	0.0	0.0	0.09	1.8	4.5	15.5
Source: Environment Canada

== Demographics ==
Population history
Year	Pop.	±%
1921	12,883	—
1931	25,564	+98.4%
1941	30,328	+18.6%
1951	58,376	+92.5%
1956	83,745	+43.5%
1961	100,157	+19.6%
1966	112,036	+11.9%
1971	125,660	+12.2%
1976	131,599	+4.7%
1981	136,494	+3.7%
1986	145,161	+6.3%
1991	158,858	+9.4%
1996	179,209	+12.8%
2001	193,954	+8.2%
2006	202,799	+4.6%
2011	223,218	+10.1%
2016	232,755	+4.3%
2021	249,125	+7.0%
Source: Statistics Canada

In the 2021 Canadian census conducted by Statistics Canada, Burnaby had a population of 249,125 living in 101,136 of its 107,046 total private dwellings, an increase of 7% from its 2016 population of 232,755. With a land area of 90.57 km^{2} (34.97 sq mi), it had a population density of 2,750.6/km^{2} (7,124.1/sq mi) in 2021.

In 2016, the median age is 40.3 years old, slightly younger than the British Columbia median of 43.0 years old.

=== Ethnicity ===
The most populous ethnic groups in Burnaby as of the 2021 census are Chinese (30%), English (7.6%), Indian (6.1%), Scottish (5.9%), Filipino (5.7%), Irish (5.1%), Italian (4.8%), German (4.3%), and Korean (3.8%).

Burnaby has diverse ethnic and immigrant communities. For example, North Burnaby near Hastings Street has long been home to many Italian restaurants and recreational bocce games. Metrotown's high-rise condominium towers in the south have been fuelled in part by arrivals from China (Hong Kong and Macau) during the 1990s, Taiwan, and South Korea. According to the 2021 census, ethnic Chinese make up the largest ethnic group of Burnaby with 33.3% while Europeans make up a close 2nd with 30.5%.

Pan-ethnic groups in Burnaby (2021): 1. East Asian (38.6%); 2. European (30.5%); 3. South Asian (9.42%); 4. Southeast Asian (8.37%); 5. Middle Eastern (3.65%); 6. Other / multiracial (3.24%); 7. Latin American (2.50%); 8. African (2.03%); 9. Indigenous (1.70%)	Pan-ethnic groups in Burnaby (2011): 1. European (39.0%); 2. East Asian (36.0%); 3. South Asian (7.94%); 4. Southeast Asian (7.65%); 5. Middle Eastern (2.71%); 6. Other / multiracial (1.92%); 7. Latin American (1.71%); 8. African (1.56%); 9. Indigenous (1.50%)	Pan-ethnic groups in Burnaby (2001): 1. European (49.7%); 2. East Asian (30.9%); 3. South Asian (7.82%); 4. Southeast Asian (4.16%); 5. Middle Eastern (1.87%); 6. Indigenous (1.64%); 7. Latin American (1.58%); 8. African (1.30%); 9. Other / multiracial (1.03%)

Panethnic groups in Burnaby (2001–2021)
Panethnic group	2021		2016		2011		2006		2001	
Panethnic group	Pop.	%	Pop.	%	Pop.	%	Pop.	%	Pop.	%
East Asian (Note: Statistic includes total responses of "Chinese", "Korean", and "Japanese" under visible minority section on census.)	94,895	38.62%	89,470	38.89%	79,205	35.96%	71,435	35.57%	59,090	30.88%
European (Note: Statistic includes all persons that did not make up part of a visible minority or an aboriginal identity.)	74,860	30.46%	79,575	34.59%	86,015	39.05%	86,560	43.1%	95,165	49.73%
South Asian	23,155	9.42%	18,735	8.14%	17,480	7.94%	16,840	8.38%	14,960	7.82%
Southeast Asian (Note: Statistic includes total responses of "Filipino" and "Southeast Asian" under visible minority section on census.)	20,560	8.37%	17,620	7.66%	16,850	7.65%	10,915	5.43%	7,965	4.16%
Middle Eastern (Note: Statistic includes total responses of "West Asian" and "Arab" under visible minority section on census.)	8,975	3.65%	6,660	2.89%	5,975	2.71%	3,700	1.84%	3,580	1.87%
Latin American	6,155	2.5%	4,630	2.01%	3,765	1.71%	2,785	1.39%	3,020	1.58%
African	4,985	2.03%	3,670	1.6%	3,445	1.56%	2,450	1.22%	2,480	1.3%
Indigenous	4,175	1.7%	4,195	1.82%	3,295	1.5%	3,005	1.5%	3,145	1.64%
Other/multiracial (Note: Statistic includes total responses of "Visible minority, n.i.e." and "Multiple visible minorities" under visible minority section on census.)	7,965	3.24%	5,530	2.4%	4,220	1.92%	3,170	1.58%	1,975	1.03%
Total responses	245,725	98.64%	230,080	98.85%	220,255	98.67%	200,855	99.04%	191,380	98.67%
Total population	249,125	100%	232,755	100%	223,218	100%	202,799	100%	193,954	100%
Note: Totals greater than 100% due to multiple origin responses

=== Language ===
According to the 2021 census, English was spoken as the mother tongue of 44.46 percent of the population. Other common languages spoken as mother tongues were Mandarin (13.91 percent), Cantonese (12.45 percent), Tagalog (3.63 percent), Korean (3.34 percent), Spanish (2.40 percent), Punjabi (2.37 percent), Persian (2.28 percent), Serbo-Croatian (1.55 percent), and Italian (1.53 percent).

Mother tongue languages in Burnaby (2001–2021)
Mother tongue	2021 Canadian census		2016 Canadian census		2011 Canadian census		2006 Canadian census		2001 Canadian census	
Mother tongue	Pop.	%	Pop.	%	Pop.	%	Pop.	%	Pop.	%
English	109,800	44.46%	100,390	43.47%	100,040	45.17%	89,460	44.54%	93,850	49.04%
Mandarin	34,360	13.91%	33,165	14.36%	28,725	12.97%	22,525	11.21%	14,460	7.56%
Cantonese	30,755	12.45%	28,750	12.45%	27,780	12.54%	28,125	14%	28,175	14.72%
Tagalog	8,970	3.63%	8,755	3.79%	7,630	3.45%	5,060	2.52%	3,265	1.71%
Korean	8,255	3.34%	7,345	3.18%	7,380	3.33%	7,030	3.5%	5,270	2.75%
Spanish	5,930	2.4%	4,485	1.94%	4,200	1.9%	3,055	1.52%	3,125	1.63%
Punjabi	5,850	2.37%	5,465	2.37%	5,705	2.58%	4,920	2.45%	4,680	2.45%
Persian	5,620	2.28%	4,265	1.85%	3,830	1.73%	2,895	1.44%	2,790	1.46%
Serbo-Croatian	3,835	1.55%	4,120	1.78%	4,230	1.91%	4,020	2%	4,390	2.29%
Italian	3,770	1.53%	4,265	1.85%	4,620	2.09%	4,285	2.13%	4,695	2.45%
Vietnamese	3,620	1.47%	2,525	1.09%	2,190	0.99%	1,945	0.97%	1,830	0.96%
Hindi	3,560	1.44%	2,425	1.05%	2,330	1.05%	2,340	1.17%	1,925	1.01%
Portuguese	3,090	1.25%	1,930	0.84%	1,480	0.67%	1,465	0.73%	1,280	0.67%
Russian	2,890	1.17%	2,740	1.19%	2,565	1.16%	1,980	0.99%	1,440	0.75%
Japanese	2,650	1.07%	2,480	1.07%	2,360	1.07%	1,765	0.88%	2,000	1.05%
French	2,555	1.03%	2,340	1.01%	2,455	1.11%	2,145	1.07%	2,135	1.12%
Arabic	2,450	0.99%	1,975	0.86%	1,575	0.71%	875	0.44%	770	0.4%
Gujarati	2,055	0.83%	1,785	0.77%	1,845	0.83%	1,750	0.87%	1,885	0.98%
German	1,295	0.52%	1,605	0.7%	1,945	0.88%	1,940	0.97%	2,390	1.25%
Polish	990	0.4%	1,060	0.46%	1,240	0.56%	1,150	0.57%	1,435	0.75%
Total responses	246,940	99.12%	230,935	99.22%	221,460	99.21%	200,855	99.04%	191,380	98.67%
Total population	249,125	100%	232,755	100%	223,218	100%	202,799	100%	193,954	100%

=== Religion ===
According to the 2021 census, religious groups in Burnaby included:

- Irreligion (118,890 persons or 48.4%)
- Christianity (86,490 persons or 35.2%)
- Islam (13,735 persons or 5.6%)
- Buddhism (9,140 persons or 3.7%)
- Hinduism (7,505 persons or 3.1%)
- Sikhism (6,905 persons or 2.8%)
- Judaism (620 persons or 0.3%)
- Indigenous spirituality (130 persons or 0.1%)
- Other (2,325 persons or 0.9%)

Religious groups in the City of Burnaby (1991−2021)
Religious group	2021 Canadian census		2011 Canadian census		2001 Canadian census		1991 Canadian census	
Religious group	Pop.	%	Pop.	%	Pop.	%	Pop.	%
Irreligion	118,890	48.38%	91,670	41.62%	67,645	35.34%	47,435	30.33%
Christianity	86,490	35.2%	94,475	42.89%	94,700	49.48%	96,220	61.52%
Islam	13,735	5.59%	9,900	4.49%	9,270	4.84%	4,000	2.56%
Buddhism	9,140	3.72%	10,660	4.84%	9,355	4.89%	2,855	1.83%
Hinduism	7,505	3.05%	4,895	2.22%	2,960	1.55%	1,570	1%
Sikhism	6,905	2.81%	6,395	2.9%	5,625	2.94%	3,370	2.15%
Judaism	620	0.25%	605	0.27%	525	0.27%	360	0.23%
Indigenous spirituality	130	0.05%	20	0.01%	115	0.06%	—N/a	—N/a
Other	2,325	0.95%	1,635	0.74%	1,185	0.62%	595	0.38%
Total responses	245,725	98.64%	220,255	98.67%	191,385	98.68%	156,415	98.46%
Total population	249,125	100%	223,218	100%	193,954	100%	158,858	100%

== Industry and economy ==
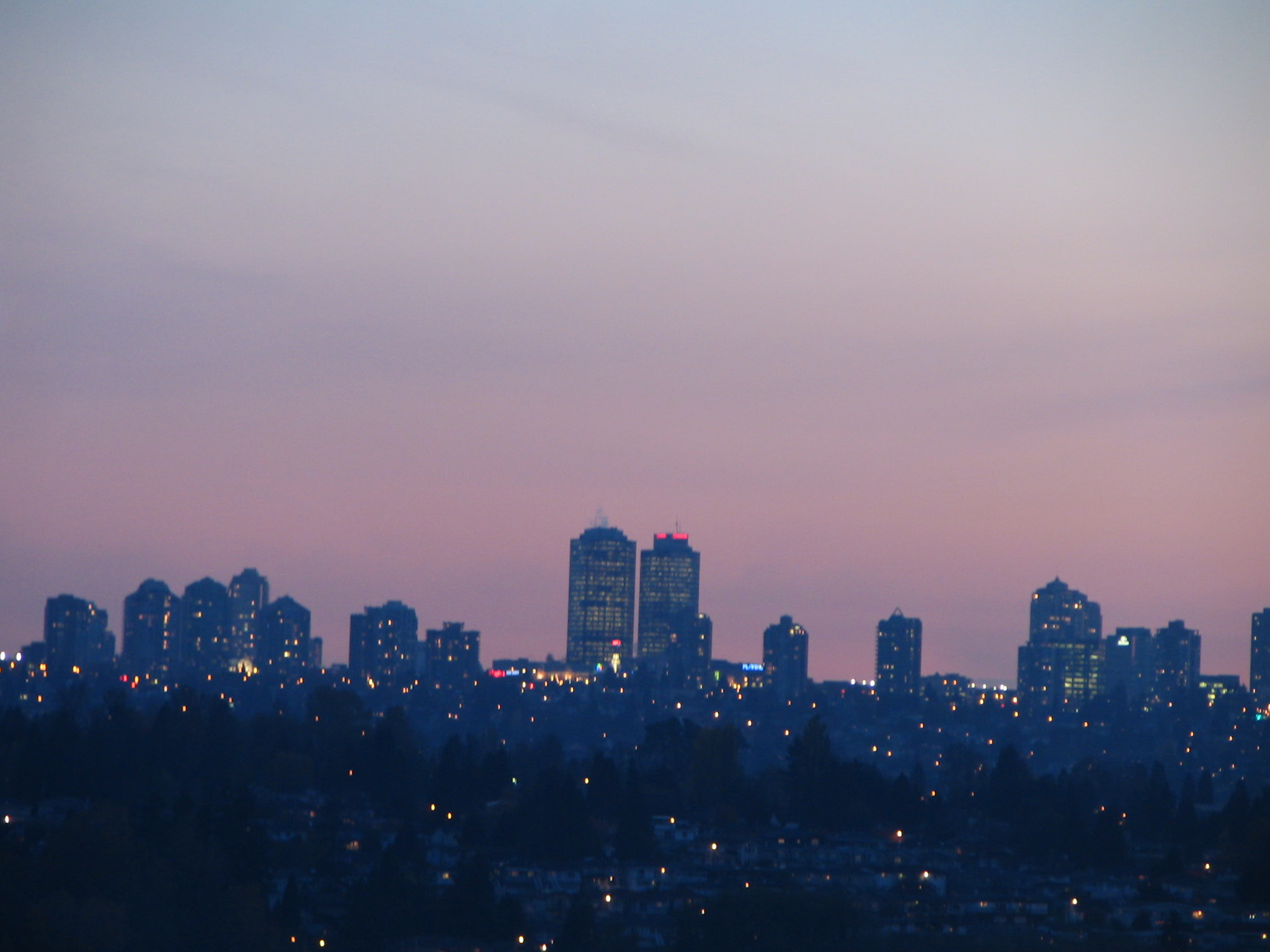
Metrotown at sunset, as seen from Lochdale

The city features major commercial town centres, high-density residential areas, two rapid transit lines, technology research, business parks, film studios such as The Bridge Studios, and TV stations such as Global TV.

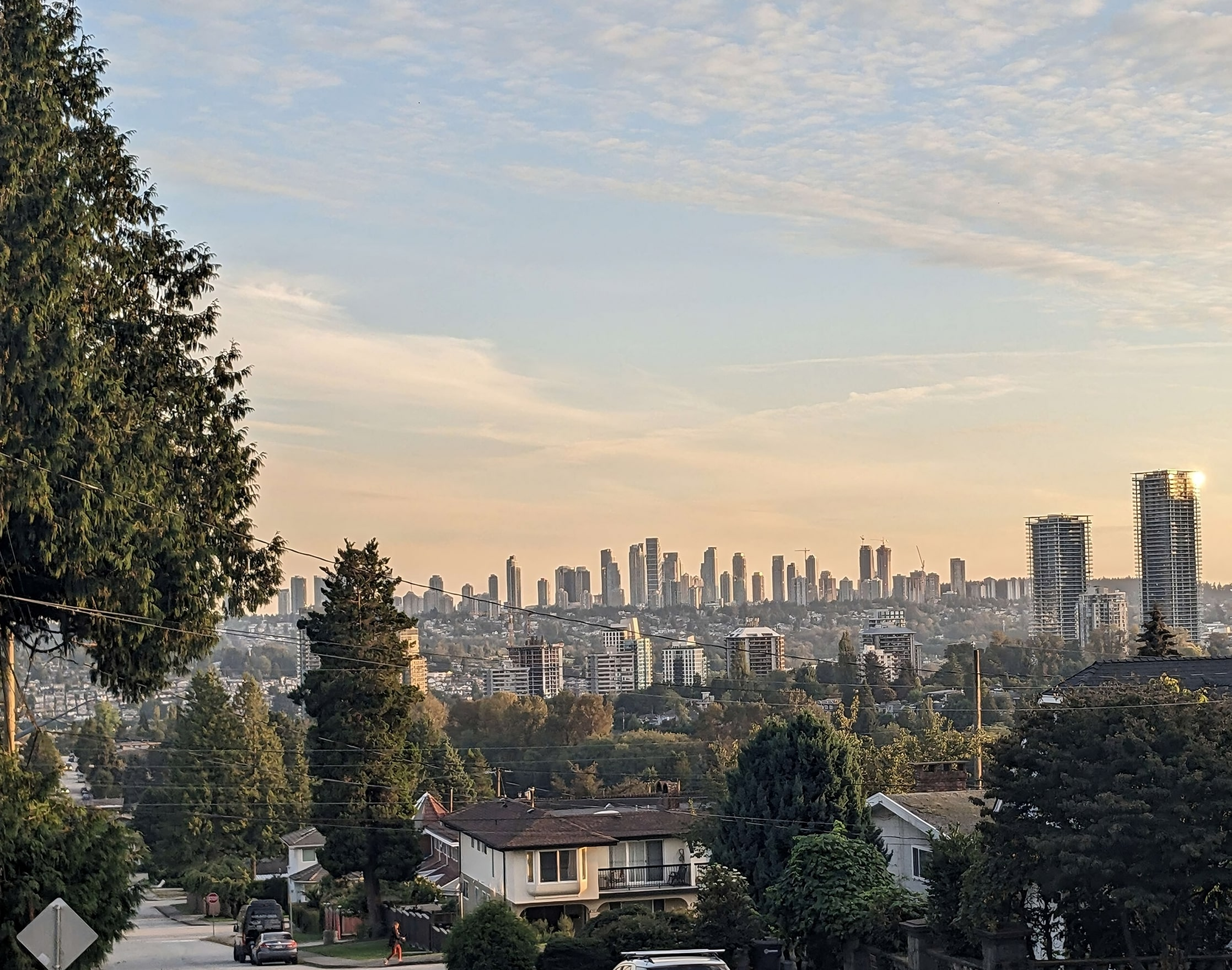
Metrotown at sunset, as seen from northwest Parkcrest (just south of Hastings Street)

Major technology firms such as Ballard Power Systems (fuel cell), D-Wave Systems (quantum computing), Clio (legal tech), Creo (imaging), and Electronic Arts Canada (studio) have their headquarters in Burnaby. Other firms with presence include Astera Labs, Fortinet, and Marvell.

Metropolis mall located in the Metrotown neighbourhood, the downtown area of Burnaby, is the largest mall in British Columbia with West Vancouver's Park Royal in second place. It is the second largest in Canada behind the first-place West Edmonton Mall in Alberta. Metropolis was the second most visited mall in Canada in 2017 and third most visited in 2018.

Heavy industry companies including Chevron Corporation and Petro-Canada petroleum refines oil on the shores of Burrard Inlet.

Ritchie Bros. Auctioneers, Pacific Blue Cross and Nokia have significant facilities in Burnaby.

Other firms with operations based in Burnaby include Kardium, Canada Wide Media, Doteasy, Telus Communications, Teradici, Mercedes-Benz Fuel Cell, HSBC Group Systems Development Centre, and TransLink. eBay ceased local operations in 2009.

== Education ==
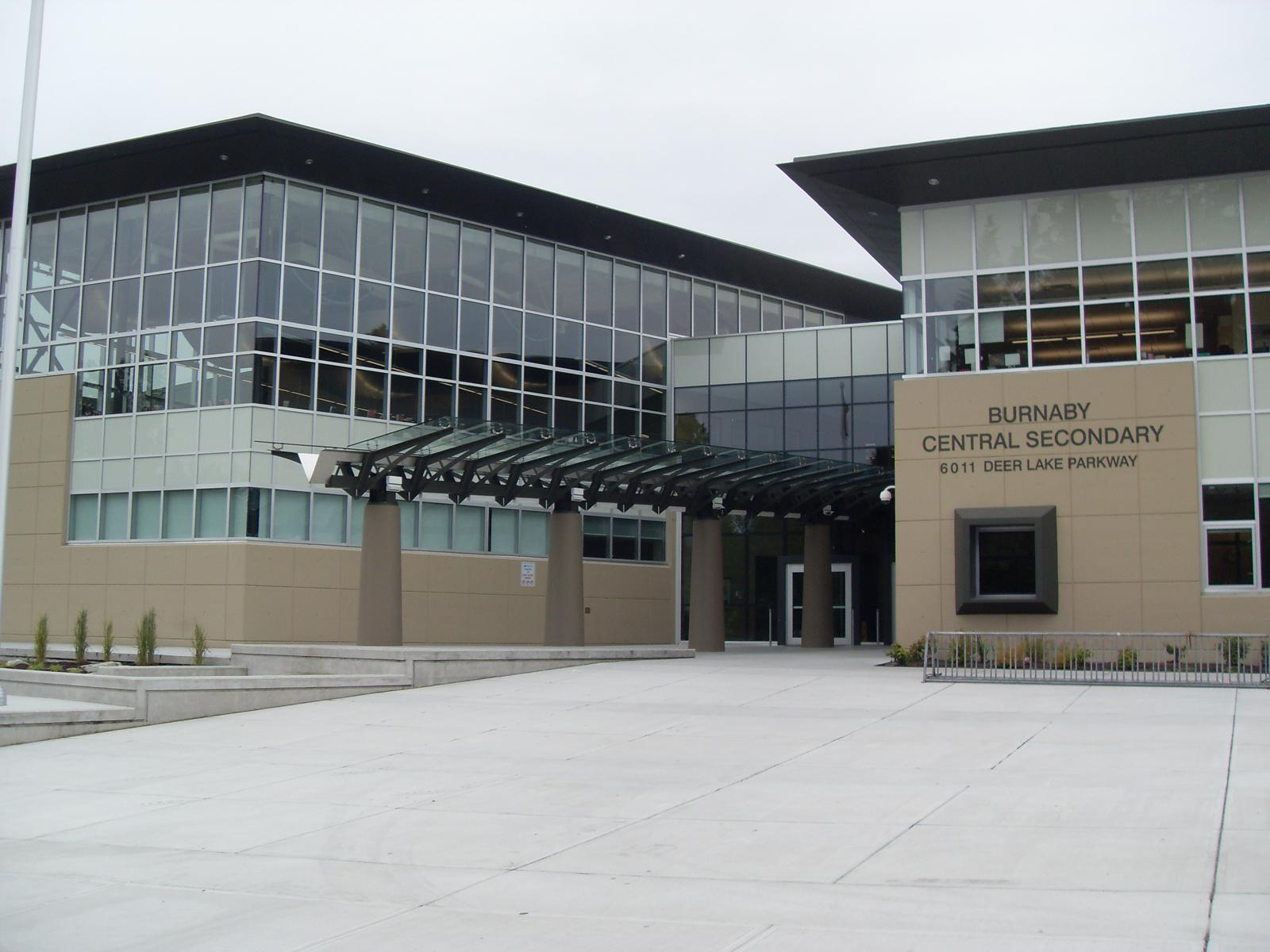
Burnaby Central Secondary School, one of Burnaby's eight public secondary schools

=== Public education ===
Over 24,000 students – across the 41 elementary schools and 8 secondary schools – are managed by School District 41 in Burnaby. It operates a community and adult education department, an international students program, and a French immersion program.

The British Columbia School for the Deaf is located on the same grounds of the Burnaby South Secondary School.

=== Higher education ===
Simon Fraser University's main campus, with more than 30,000 students and 950 staff, is located atop Burnaby Mountain. In Maclean's 2020 rankings, the university placed first in their comprehensive university category, and ninth in their reputation ranking for Canadian universities.

British Columbia Institute of Technology's main campus in Burnaby, home to more than 49,000 full-time and part-time students, was established in 1964. A new $78 million, net-zero emission Health Science Centre, expected to open in late 2021, will accommodate 7,000 students.

== Arts and culture ==
Burnaby is home to multiple museums highlighting the diverse history and culture of the city. Burnaby Village Museum is a 4.0-hectare (10-acre) open-air museum preserving a 1920s Canadian village. The Nikkei National Museum & Cultural Centre, which includes a Japanese garden, opened in 2000 to promote awareness and understanding of Japanese Canadian culture. The Museum of Archaeology and Ethnology and SFU Galleries are located within the Simon Fraser University campus at the top of Burnaby Mountain.

Burnaby Public Library was first established in 1954. It currently has four locations throughout the city, including the Bobbie Prittie Metrotown, McGill, Tommy Douglas and Cameron branches in each of the four town centres. The library system holds over three million items in circulation, with more than 5,000 visitors per day.

Many cultural facilities are located in or around Deer Lake Park, including the Burnaby Art Gallery, Shadbolt Centre for the Arts, and the Burnaby Village Museum.

Michael J. Fox Theatre, a community theatre that seats 613, with 11 wheelchair spaces, is situated within Burnaby South Secondary School.

== Sports ==
The city's main stadium, Swangard Stadium, is located in Central Park (Burnaby). It was completed in 1969. The stadium was home to the Vancouver 86ers (now the Vancouver Whitecaps FC) in the Canadian Soccer League from 1986 to 2010, when the team relocated to BC Place to play in the Major League Soccer. It is currently the home of the Vancouver Rise FC of the Northern Super League.

Burnaby co-hosted the 1973 Canada Games with New Westminster.

Burnaby Velodrome hosted the National Junior and U17 Track Championship in 2014.

Burnaby was the host for the 2014 IQA Global Games, the second edition of the international quidditch championship.

== Transportation ==
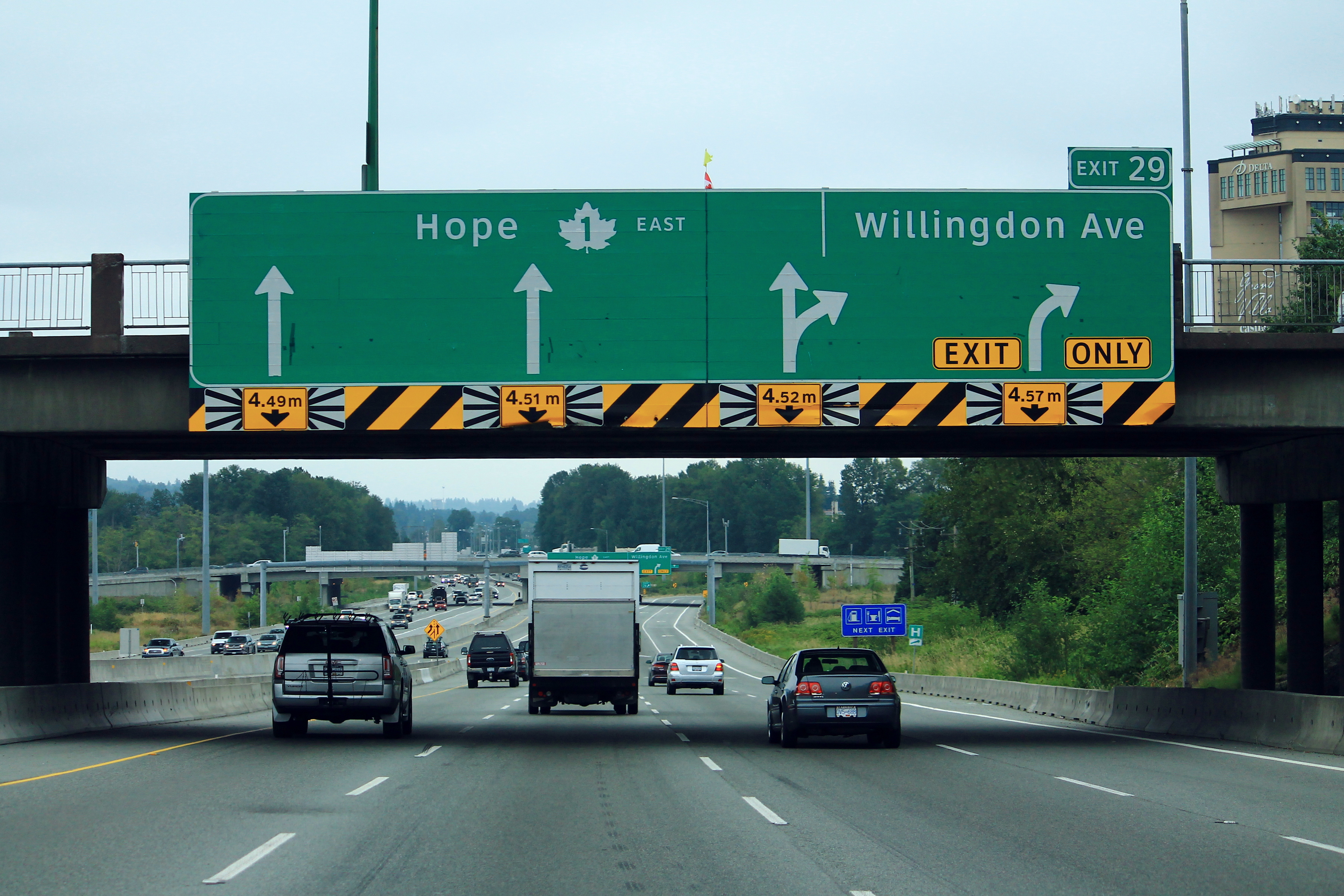
Trans Canada highway in Burnaby

The SkyTrain Operations Controls Centre 1, built in the 1980s, is responsible for the maintenance and operations of both the region's Expo Line and Millennium Line. In 2021, construction began on a $110 million Operations Controls Centre 2 to accommodate growing transit ridership.

The Expo Line, completed in 1986, crosses the south along Kingsway. The Millennium Line, completed in 2002, follows Lougheed Highway. The SkyTrain has encouraged closer connections to New Westminster, Vancouver, and Surrey, as well as dense urban development at Lougheed Town Centre on the city's eastern border, at Brentwood Town Centre in the centre-west, Edmonds–Highgate in the southeast and, most notably, at Metrotown in the south.

Major north–south streets crossing the city include Boundary Road, Willingdon Avenue, Royal Oak Avenue, Kensington Avenue, Sperling Avenue, Gaglardi Way, Cariboo Road, and North Road. East–west routes linking Burnaby's neighbouring cities to each other include Hastings Street, Barnet Highway, the Lougheed Highway, Kingsway (which follows the old horse trail between Vancouver and New Westminster), Canada Way and Marine Drive/Marine Way. Douglas Road, which used to cross the city from northwest to southeast, has largely been absorbed by the Trans-Canada Highway and Canada Way.

Since the 1990s, more than 70 kilometres (43 mi) of bike routes and urban trails have been laid in Burnaby.

The city is served by Metro Vancouver's bus system, run by the Coast Mountain Bus Company, a division of TransLink, the region's transportation authority. The 49 bus route, connecting Metrotown and the University of British Columbia, is the second most boarded bus route after route 99, which is the busiest bus route in North America. Burnaby is also served by the RapidBus network on the R5 Hastings St and the R2 Marine–Willingdon.

The 2050 Burnaby Transportation Plan, adopted in December 2021, outlines three targets: to reduce traffic fatalities to zero, to increase public transit and active transportation to 75 percent of all trips, and to reduce vehicle emissions by 100 percent.

== Politics ==
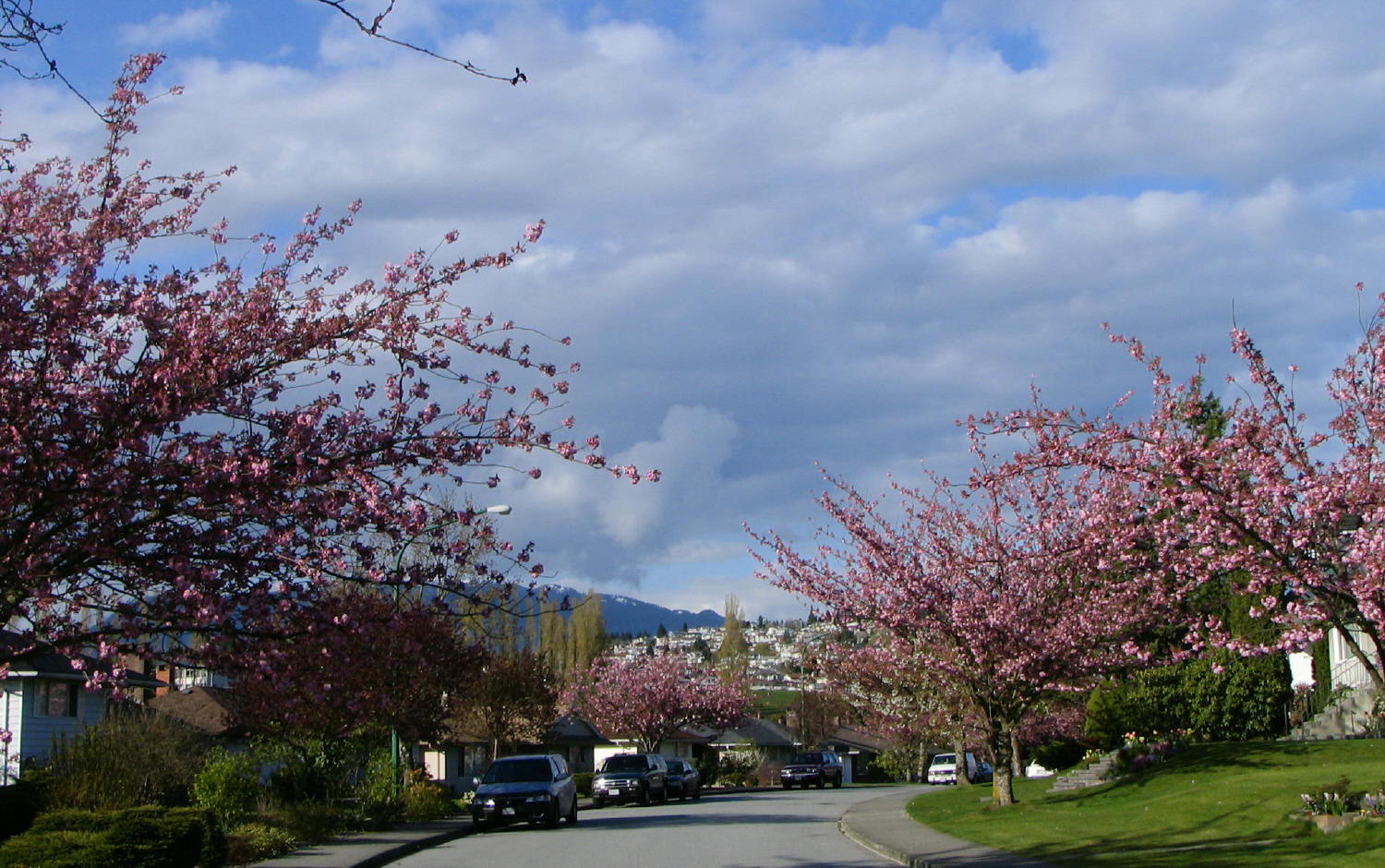
The Brentwood neighbourhood, with Capitol Hill in the distance

While Burnaby occupies about 4 percent of the land area of the Metro Vancouver Regional District, it accounted for about 10 percent of the region's population in 2016. It is the third most populated urban centre in British Columbia (after Vancouver and Surrey), with a population of 249,125 (2021).

Burnaby federal election results
Year	Conservative		Green		New Democratic		Liberal	
2021	23%	20,915	3%	2,633	38%	34,213	33%	30,108
2019	27%	25,974	6%	6,155	37%	36,369	27%	26,033

Burnaby provincial election results
Year	BC Liberal		Green		New Democratic	
2020	29%	22,149	12%	9,097	59%	45,721
2017	36%	30,576	13%	10,894	50%	41,932

Politically, Burnaby has maintained a left-wing city council closely affiliated with the provincial NDP and school board for many years, while sometimes electing more conservative legislators provincially (from the Social Credit and BC Liberal parties) and federally (from the Reform, Alliance, and Conservative parties). Its longest-serving politician had been Svend Robinson of the New Democratic Party (NDP), Canada's first openly gay member of Parliament, but after 25 years and seven elections he resigned his post in early 2004 after stealing and then returning an expensive ring. Burnaby voters endorsed his assistant, Bill Siksay, as his replacement in the 2004 Canadian federal election. In the May 2013 provincial election, residents of the city sent 3 NDP MLAs and one Liberal MLA to the British Columbia legislature. The NDP MLA for Burnaby-Lougheed, Jane Shin, faced controversy after the election for misrepresenting herself as a physician despite not having completed a medical residency nor holding a licence to practice medicine.

According to a 2009 survey by Maclean's magazine, Burnaby was Canada's best-run city. The survey looks at a city's efficiency, the cost of producing results, and the effectiveness of its city services. However, Maclean's did note that Burnaby has one of the worst municipal voter turnouts in the country, at 26 percent. In 2015, the Canadian Federation of Independent Business (CFIB) included Burnaby as a Vancouver periphery to rank eighth for entrepreneurial communities.

== Flag ==
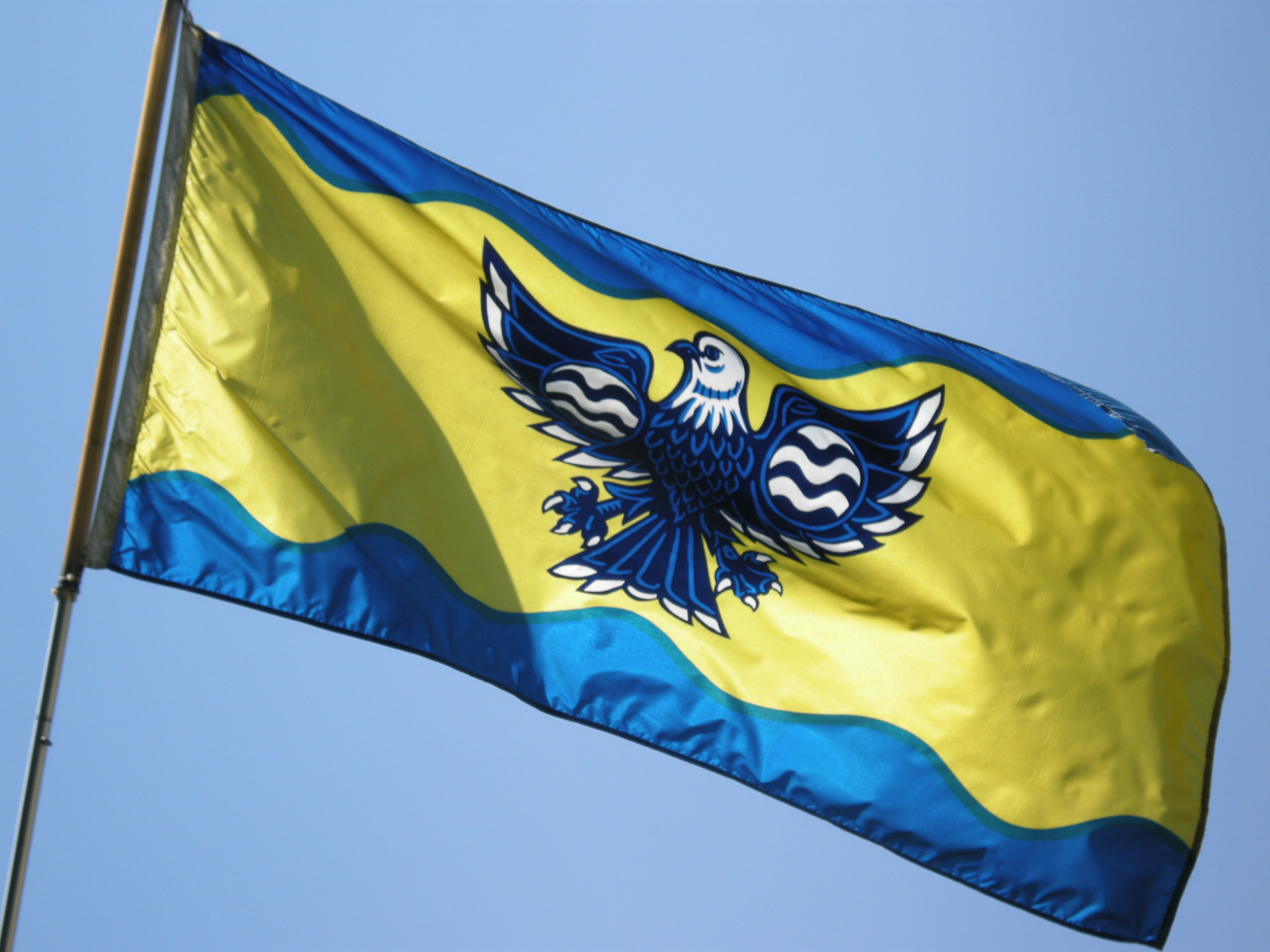
The flag of Burnaby flying at Burnaby Village Museum

The flag of Burnaby is a yellow field bordered above and below by a wavy blue stripe and charged in the center with an eagle bearing on each wing a circle with wavy blue and white stripes inside. The flag's symbols carry geographical meaning: the top blue stripe represents the Burrard Inlet to the north, while the bottom one represents the Fraser River to the south; the two circles represent Deer Lake and Burnaby Lake; and the eagle symbolizes Burnaby Mountain.

== Notable people ==
- Karl Alzner, NHL hockey player
- Glenn Anderson, former NHL hockey player
- Andrea Bang, actor, known for Kim's Convenience
- Andrew Boden, writer
- Michael Bublé, singer
- Christy Clark, former premier of British Columbia
- Kris Chucko, NHL hockey player
- Ian James Corlett, voice actor, writer, and TV producer
- Robin Esrock, South African–born Canadian travel writer, TV host and author
- Michael J. Fox, Canadian-American actor
- Kaleigh Fratkin (born 1992), professional ice hockey player
- Jacob Hoggard, lead singer of Hedley
- Joe Keithley, musician and Burnaby politician
- Braam Jordaan, South African–born entrepreneur, filmmaker, animator, and activist
- Eagle Keys, American-born CFL football player and head coach
- Jason LaBarbera, NHL hockey player
- Brad Loree, movie stuntman
- Kenndal McArdle, former NHL hockey player and investment banker
- John H. McArthur, Harvard Business School dean
- Darren McCarty, NHL hockey player
- Carrie-Anne Moss, movie, television and voice actress
- Kimberly Newell, PWHL hockey player
- Dave Nonis, former senior vice president and director of Hockey Operations of the Toronto Maple Leafs
- Ryan Nugent-Hopkins, NHL hockey player
- Mark Olver, NHL and KHL hockey player
- Tyler O'Neill, MLB player for the Baltimore Orioles
- Buzz Parsons, NASL soccer player and later CSL coach
- Dugald Campbell Patterson, Scottish-born Burnaby pioneer
- Colin Percival, computer scientist
- Dick Phillips, American-born MLB baseball player and PCL team manager
- Marcello Polisi, soccer player
- Roy Radu, Rugby union player
- Svend Robinson, former federal MP, arbitrator/advocate and parliamentary relations consultant
- Cliff Ronning, former NHL hockey player
- Joe Sakic, former NHL hockey player
- Mike Santorelli, NHL hockey player
- Murray SawChuck, Canadian-born Las Vegas-based magician
- Niko Sigur, soccer player
- Gurv and Harv Sihra, Indian-Canadian professional wrestlers known as Sunil and Samir Singh
- Josh Simpson, soccer player
- Christine Sinclair, NWSL soccer player and captain of the Canadian Women's National Soccer Team.
- Don Taylor, Vancouver-area television sportscaster
- Cory Weeds, jazz musician
- Patrick Wiercioch, NHL hockey player
- Greg Zanon, AHL and NHL hockey player
- Micky Papa, professional skateboarder

== Sister cities ==
Burnaby has four sister cities:

- Kushiro, Hokkaido, Japan (1965)
- Mesa, Arizona, United States (1998)
- Hwaseong, Gyeonggi-do, South Korea (2010)
- Zhongshan, Guangdong, China (2011)

== See also ==
- List of tallest buildings in Burnaby
