= Zooplus =

German online pet food retailer

Zooplus SE
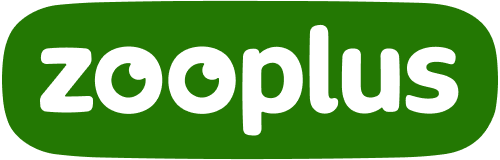
- Company type: Societas Europaea
- Traded as: FWB:ZO1
- ISIN: DE0005111702
- Industry: Retail
- Founded: June 28, 1999; 26 years ago
- Headquarters: Munich, Germany
- Area served: 30 countries
- Key people: Lionel Desclée (Chairman), Steffen Schüller, Stefan Götz (Chairman of the Board)
- Products: Pet food
- Revenue: €2.678 billion (2023)
- Number of employees: 1,194 (2023)
- Website: www.zooplus.com

Zooplus SE (stylized and branded as zooplus) is an online retailer of pet food and supplies with headquarters in Munich, Germany. Founded in 1999, the e-commerce company ships to 30 countries in Europe, including Germany, the United Kingdom, France, Italy, Spain, Poland, the Netherlands, Austria and Switzerland. As of 2023, the product range comprises approximately 15,000 items.

In 2023, Zooplus SE achieved a total result of €2.678 billion. Between 2008 and 2021, Zooplus was listed at the Frankfurt Stock Exchange and was for a long time a constituent of the SDAX stock market index.

== History ==
=== Company history ===
Zooplus AG was founded on June 28, 1999, by Roland Honekamp, Cornelius Patt, Sven Rittau, Florian Seubert, and Philipp Freiherr von Wilmowsky. Hubert Burda Media media group supported the foundation financially and was the largest shareholder of Zooplus for many years. The company was established to offer pet supplies in the growing online retail market of the late 1990s. This was followed by several funding rounds in the double-digit million Deutschmarks range, although the dot-com bubble in 2000 made it increasingly difficult to find investors.

By 2002, the company’s customer base had grown to 160,000, with an order volume of €13 million, a 40% increase compared to the previous year. In 2007, the company employed 40 people.

In addition to its IPO in May 2008, the same year saw the relocation of the company’s registered office from Unterföhring to nearby Munich. As of December 31, 2008, the company employed 79 people and generated revenues of €80.34 million. By December 31, 2009, the number of employees had increased to 108. In the same period, revenue rose by more than 60% to €127.71 million.

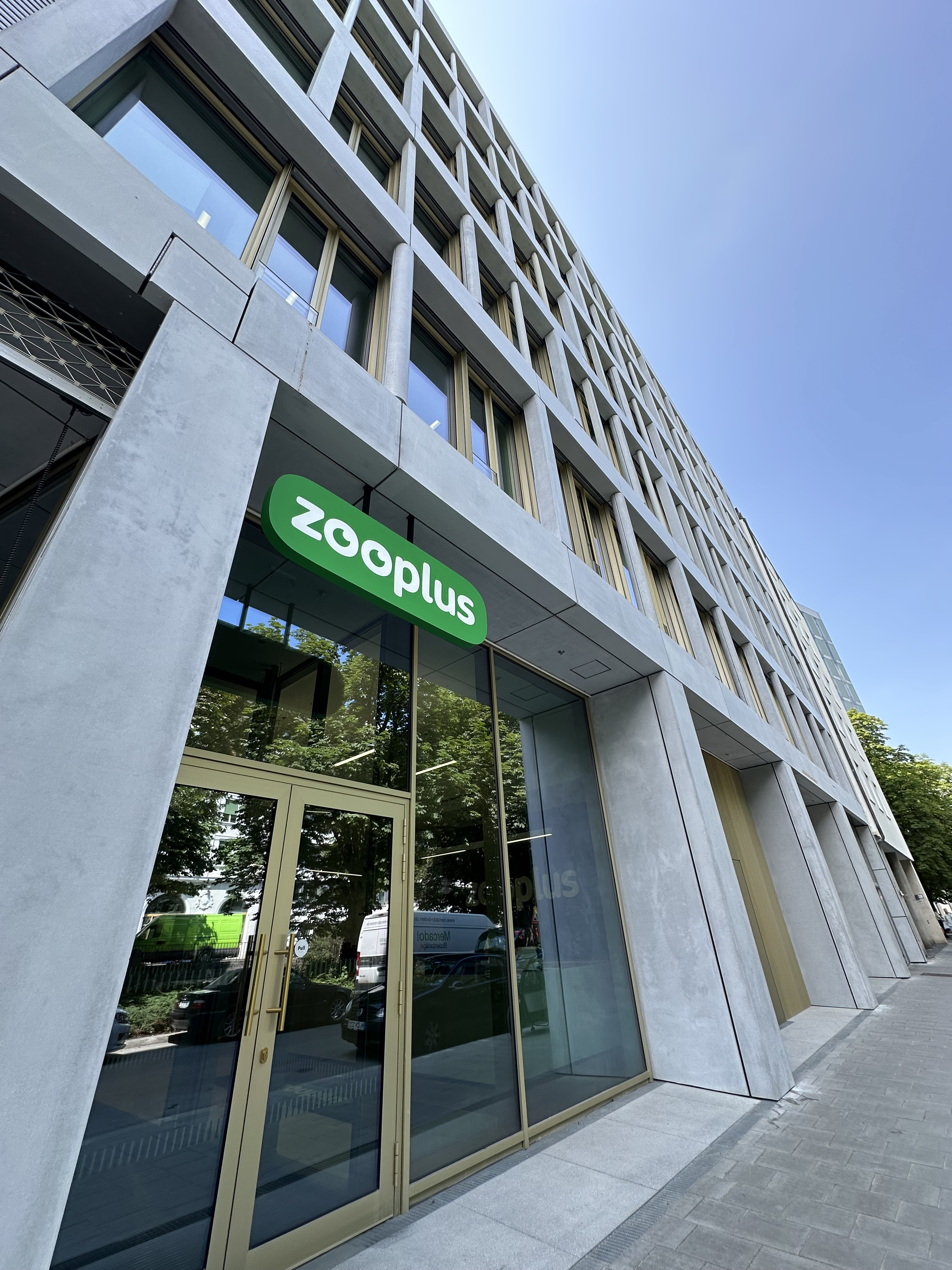
Company headquarters in Munich

In 2012, Zooplus became the second-largest pet food retailer in Germany after Fressnapf with a market share of around 10%, although Zooplus generates higher online sales than Fressnapf (as of 2024). In the 2010s, Zooplus increasingly expanded outside Germany.

Sales for the first half of 2015 were €344 million, up 34% compared with the first half of 2014. The company expected 2015 sales to total at least €725 million.

In fall 2018, Amazon started to sell pet food in Europe under its own brands. Despite the new competitor from the US, Zooplus realised €1.342 million of total sales in 2018, a growth of 21% compared to the previous year.

During the COVID-19 pandemic in the early 2020s, Zooplus benefited from increased demand in online retail, as many physical stores remained closed and customers avoided them due to fear of infection. In the first half of 2020, the company generated a profit of around €7.8 million. In addition, the number of pet owners increased during the pandemic, which had a generally positive impact on the pet food retail sector according to Stuttgarter Zeitung. In February 2021, the company decided to remove pet accessories considered problematic from an animal welfare perspective from its online platforms in all countries.

On August 13, 2021, Zorro Bidco S.à r.l. and Zooplus AG signed an investor agreement for a strategic partnership. The goal of this partnership was to strengthen Zooplus's market position as an online platform for pet supplies in Europe. The company Zorro Bidco is controlled by funds advised by Hellman & Friedman LLC. At the same time, Zorro Bidco made a voluntary takeover offer of €390 per share. The stock price subsequently rose by over 40% to €392.80. This triggered a takeover battle among several companies for Zooplus, against the backdrop of a growing pet food market at the time, with the highest bid reaching €470 per share (~€3.36 billion). In early October 2021, Pet Bidco (indirectly held by EQT Private Equity) outbid the offer, prompting Hellman & Friedman to follow suit. Eventually, both bidders joined forces and offered €480 per share. More than 50% of the shares were acquired. In the context of the takeover, Zooplus entered into a long-term strategic agreement with Hellman & Friedman.

Following company founder Cornelius Patt, who was the CEO from 2006 to 2022, Geoffroy Lefebvre joined zooplus in this role in November 2022. Subsequently, a broader product range, a loyalty program, an updated app, and a new subscription model were introduced. At the end of November 2024, Lefebvre left the company. Lionel Desclée became the new CEO of zooplus SE on September 15, 2025.

=== Stock Market History ===
The company's shares were listed on the Frankfurt Stock Exchange on May 9, 2008, in the Entry Standard segment without issuing new shares and were later included in the Entry Standard Index. On October 22, 2009, the company switched to the Prime Standard. In 2011, Burda Media increased its stake in Zooplus to 50.04%, thereby becoming the majority shareholder. Starting in 2015, Burda gradually sold off its shares in the company.

According to Cornelius Welp in Die Welt, Zooplus shares developed "steadily but inconspicuously" for a long time, before experiencing an “unprecedented surge” during the boom in online retail prompted by the COVID-19 pandemic. Zooplus was listed in the SDAX for many years and, starting on September 20, 2021, in the MDAX.

Following the company's acquisition, the stock was removed from the MDAX on December 20, 2021 (delisting). In December 2021, the new company owners made a delisting offer to the remaining shareholders, which was accepted by all of them. Since January 2022, the stock is no longer publicly traded.

== Corporate Structure ==
As of 2025, the companies Hellman & Friedman and EQT are the owners of Zooplus. The company is managed by an executive board and a supervisory board. On February 23, 2022, the legal form of the company was changed from a stock corporation (AG) to a European stock corporation (SE).

In 2022, the company generated revenues of €2.678 billion and employed nearly 1,200 people. Zooplus is headquartered in Munich and maintains additional offices in Madrid, Kraków, Vienna and London. The company operates several logistics warehouses; in 2023, facilities were opened in the Czech town of Bor and in Hungary near Budapest.

== Products and services ==
Zooplus, being a pure online retailer, offers both pet food and pet accessories on its online platform. As of 2023, the product range included around 15,000 different items.

In addition to brands from other manufacturers, Zooplus also offers its own private labels such as “Briantos,” "Cosma", "Purizon", "Smilla", and "Wolf of Wilderness". According to Cornelius Welp in Die Welt, the product range is tailored to the specific demands of national markets. For example, in Spain, smaller dog food packages are produced and sold due to the trend toward owning smaller dog breeds.

In 2021, Zooplus ranked 24th on the list of the highest-revenue D2C online shops in Germany, with sales of €446.8 million. In the pet supplies segment, this made the company the largest online retailer at that time.

== Awards ==
In 2017, Zooplus was ranked first in the study "Success Factors in E-Commerce" conducted by the Institute for Retail Research from Cologne among 79 participating online shops. More than 8,000 customers evaluated online shops in the study across six categories: website usability, product range, price-performance ratio, service, payment, and delivery. In 2025, Zooplus received an award in the pet supplies shopping apps category at the Deutsche App Award, presented by the German Institute for Service Quality and n-tv.
