= Mambu (company) =

German software company

Mambu GmbH
- Type: Private
- Industry: Fintech; Software
- Founded: 2011; 15 years ago in Berlin
- Founder: Frederik Pfisterer; Eugene Danilkis; Sofia Nunes
- Headquarters: Amsterdam, Netherlands
- Area served: Worldwide
- Key people: Fernando Zandona (CEO)
- Products: Banking software
- Website: mambu.com

Mambu GmbH is a German-Dutch software company headquartered in Amsterdam. Mambu provides infrastructure for banks and financial service providers as a software as a service (SaaS) model. In December 2021, Mambu reached a company valuation of $5.3 billion, making it one of the German unicorns.

== History ==
Mambu began as a one-year capstone project by five students in Carnegie Mellon University's Master of Human-Computer Interaction program. The project involved user research, prototyping, and design documentation, which included conducting field research on microfinance institutions in Mozambique. The student team consisted of Josh Coe (design), Eugene Danilkis (project management), Sofia Nunes (psychology), Frederik Pfisterer (technology), and Joydeep Sengupta (user experience research).

After the project ended, three team members continued developing the platform and founded Mambu based on their thesis work. The platform provided technical infrastructure for microfinanciers in Latin America and Africa. It received early funding from Commerzbank and Berlin-based venture capitalist Point Nine.

In June 2021, Mambu raised €200 million in a financing round led by EQT AB. By 2022, Mambu had reached $165 million in contracted annual recurring revenue.

In June 2023, Eugene Danilkis, left his role as CEO, remaining a shareholder and member of the board. The company's CTO, Fernando Zandona, was named interim CEO, and then was officially named CEO in August 2023.
