= Burnaby Mountain =

Mountain in Canada

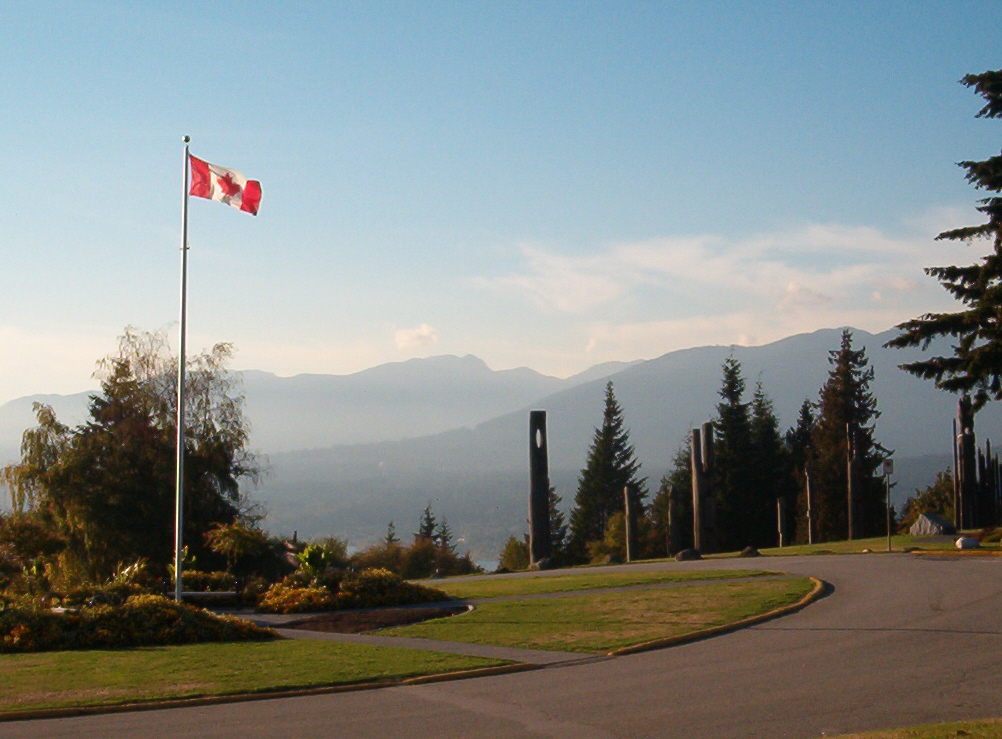
- A view from Burnaby Mountain's Centennial Park

Highest point
- Elevation: 370 m (1,210 ft)
- Prominence: 354 m (1,161 ft)
- Coordinates: 49°16′45″N 122°54′31″W

Geography
- Location: Burnaby, British Columbia, Canada
- Topo map: NTS 92G7 Port Coquitlam

Burnaby Mountain, elev. 370 m (1,214 ft), is a low, forested mountain in the city of Burnaby, British Columbia, Canada, overlooking the upper arms of Burrard Inlet. It is the location of Simon Fraser University Burnaby Campus, the Discovery Park research community, and the System Control Tower of BC Hydro and a residential neighbourhood with retail shops development called UniverCity. In November 1995, the Province of British Columbia and Simon Fraser University reached an agreement to transfer 330 hectares of university land to the City of Burnaby for inclusion into Burnaby Mountain Conservation Area.

== Wildlife ==
In spite of residential development on its western slope and continuing deforestation due to condominium construction around SFU, the mountain still has wildlife remaining such as deer, raccoons, coyotes customarily roaming local streets. A few black bears, sometimes mothers with cubs, pay occasional visits to the forest trails—and even the backyards of Westridge residents. Common wild birds include several types of woodpeckers, northern flickers, Steller's jays, great blue herons, barred owls, and great horned owls. Sightings of bald eagles over the mountain's eastern forest are not uncommon.

== Climate ==
Climate data for Burnaby Mountain (Simon Fraser University) (Elevation: 365.8m) 1981−2010
Month	Jan	Feb	Mar	Apr	May	Jun	Jul	Aug	Sep	Oct	Nov	Dec	Year
Record high °C (°F)	16.5 (61.7)	17.1 (62.8)	19.4 (66.9)	23.7 (74.7)	28.9 (84.0)	29.6 (85.3)	34.0 (93.2)	33.9 (93.0)	31.6 (88.9)	24.5 (76.1)	16.3 (61.3)	12.1 (53.8)	33.5 (92.3)
Mean daily maximum °C (°F)	5.8 (42.4)	6.8 (44.2)	9.3 (48.7)	12.4 (54.3)	15.6 (60.1)	18.2 (64.8)	21.2 (70.2)	21.2 (70.2)	18.0 (64.4)	12.0 (53.6)	7.5 (45.5)	5.1 (41.2)	12.7 (54.9)
Daily mean °C (°F)	3.6 (38.5)	4.3 (39.7)	6.2 (43.2)	8.7 (47.7)	11.8 (53.2)	14.4 (57.9)	17.0 (62.6)	17.2 (63.0)	14.6 (58.3)	9.5 (49.1)	5.3 (41.5)	2.9 (37.2)	9.6 (49.3)
Mean daily minimum °C (°F)	1.4 (34.5)	1.7 (35.1)	3.1 (37.6)	4.9 (40.8)	7.9 (46.2)	10.5 (50.9)	12.7 (54.9)	13.2 (55.8)	11.1 (52.0)	7.0 (44.6)	3.0 (37.4)	0.8 (33.4)	6.5 (43.7)
Record low °C (°F)	−13.9 (7.0)	−14.0 (6.8)	−8.0 (17.6)	−3.3 (26.1)	−0.5 (31.1)	3.9 (39.0)	5.0 (41.0)	3.3 (37.9)	2.0 (35.6)	−7.0 (19.4)	−14.0 (6.8)	−19.4 (−2.9)	−19.4 (−2.9)
Average precipitation mm (inches)	280.9 (11.06)	178.4 (7.02)	182.1 (7.17)	154.4 (6.08)	120.0 (4.72)	101.4 (3.99)	64.7 (2.55)	64.5 (2.54)	92.2 (3.63)	210.1 (8.27)	311.6 (12.27)	249.8 (9.83)	2,009.9 (79.13)
Average rainfall mm (inches)	256.5 (10.10)	163.2 (6.43)	171.2 (6.74)	152.7 (6.01)	119.9 (4.72)	101.4 (3.99)	64.7 (2.55)	64.5 (2.54)	92.2 (3.63)	209.8 (8.26)	303.6 (11.95)	220.8 (8.69)	1,920.7 (75.62)
Average snowfall cm (inches)	24.3 (9.6)	15.1 (5.9)	10.9 (4.3)	1.7 (0.7)	0.1 (0.0)	0.0 (0.0)	0.0 (0.0)	0.0 (0.0)	0.0 (0.0)	0.2 (0.1)	8.0 (3.1)	29.0 (11.4)	89.3 (35.2)
Average precipitation days (≥ 0.2 mm)	20.5	16.2	18.9	16.1	14.9	13.5	7.4	6.8	10.3	17.1	21.6	19.8	183.1
Average rainy days (≥ 0.2 mm)	18.1	14.7	18.3	16	14.9	13.5	7.4	6.8	10.3	17	21	17.3	175.3
Average snowy days (≥ 0.2 cm)	4	2.5	2	0.54	0.04	0.0	0.0	0.0	0.0	0.09	1.8	4.5	15.47
Source: Environment Canada (normals, 1981−2010)

== Attractions ==
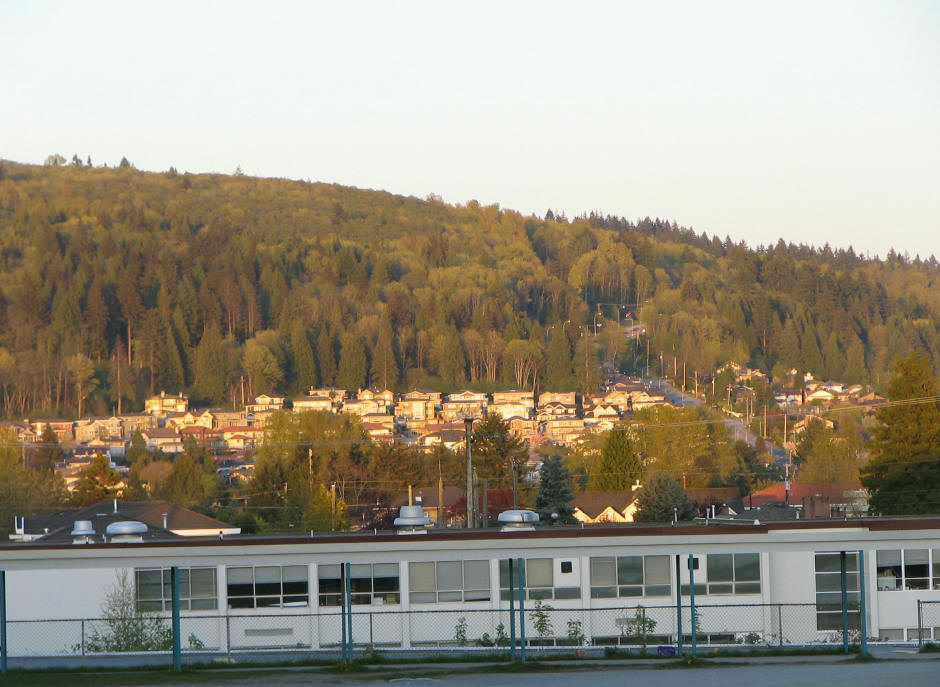
The western slope of Burnaby Mountain as seen from Burnaby North Secondary School

Burnaby Mountain has a viewpoint facing west at Centennial Park. The yearly Celebration of Light fireworks festival on English Bay west of downtown Vancouver can be seen from the park and attracts an audience on the parks' westward-facing lawns.

The mountain is known for its mountain biking trails and obstacles. There are easy trails like Sidebandit, challenging rides (Mel's) and two hard, steep runs (Nicoles, Gearjammer).

Due to its relatively high elevation, snow will often fall on the higher levels of Burnaby Mountain while rain falls in the surrounding cities. Tobogganing is a popular pastime at Centennial Park on winter days with snow.

The park is also home to a collection of Ainu totem pole-like carvings which commemorate the goodwill between Burnaby and its sister city, Kushiro, Japan, and a fairly large formal rose garden.
