= Vancouver Greenway Network =

Collection of greenways across Vancouver

The Vancouver Greenway Network is a collection of greenways across Vancouver, British Columbia, Canada. Greenways are streets where pedestrians and cyclists are prioritized over motorized vehicles, through structures such as road closures and road diverters to prevent or limit motor vehicle traffic, widened sidewalk-promenades, narrowed road space, speed restrictions, bike lanes, raised sidewalks and speed bumps. The City of Vancouver hopes to create and maintain the trend of constructing new greenways to establish a network where, potentially, every citizen could access a city greenway within a 25-minute walking or a 10-minute cycling distance of their home.

Anticipated ecological benefits of the build greenway networks include enhancing linkage of conservation and recreation areas for cyclists, protection of some natural assets along corridors, and improving resiliency. In addition, the current Council hopes that city greenways can encourage recreational opportunities in urban areas for citizens, increase trips by foot and by bike, decrease trips by motor vehicles, and strengthen pedestrian and cyclist links between nature and urban areas.

The network is partly constructed, with several greenways either still under development or in the consultation phase. The completed greenway network will be 140 km long, and serve as a pedestrian- and cyclist-prioritized network of trails and paths throughout the city.

== City greenways ==
=== Arbutus Greenway ===
In 2016, the City of Vancouver purchased 17 hectares (42 acres) of land from the Canadian Pacific Railway (CPR) for the construction of the new greenway bikeway. This occurred after a multi-year dispute between the City and CPR over CPR's plans to reactivate the railway that was unused for over a decade. The Arbutus Greenway will be connected from the Seaside Greenway in False Creek to the Fraser River. The goal is to create a space mainly for non-motorized modes of transportation. As part of a condition in the agreement between the City and CPR, at least part of the corridor is to be used for light rail, in addition to cycling paths. The construction of a section of the greenway bikeway is scheduled to start by late 2019. It will run parallel to Arbutus Street and West Boulevard, from the neighbourhoods of Kitsilano to Marpole.

The project is in its phase of conceptual design, which involves "design jams" and creating several design options. The phases are:

1. Temporary Path
2. Visioning
3. Conceptual design
4. Preliminary design
5. Detailed design
6. Construction

==== Proposed benefits of the Arbutus Greenway ====
- Connect neighbourhoods
- Provide a place for socializing
- Provide a safe space for commuters
- Provide a place for events

=== Central Valley ===
The Central Valley Greenway is a 24-kilometre-long (15 mi) pedestrian and cyclist route that runs from Science World in Vancouver to New Westminster, through Burnaby. The greenway provides a safe corridor for commuters and a green route to local parks. In the Burnaby and New Westminster sections, the route runs parallel to the Millennium SkyTrain Line.

Along the way, the Central Valley Greenway connects major destinations, including

- False Creek Seawall
- Great Northern Way Campus
- Vancouver Community College (VCC)
- Commercial Drive
- Burnaby Lake Sports Complex
- Burnaby Lake Regional Park
- Hume Park
- Sapperton
- Royal Columbian Hospital
- Downtown New Westminster
- 13 SkyTrain stations

=== Comox–Helmcken ===
The Comox–Helmcken Greenway was first approved by City Council as part of its 2002 Downtown Transportation Plan, and it extends from Stanley Park to the False Creek Seawall. The two-kilometre greenway was completed at a total cost of $5 million, and was found in a study by the University of British Columbia to have increased pedestrian and cyclist use, while car use declined due to restrictions in motorist accessibility along the route.

A study called "Active Streets Active People" was conducted by the Centre for Hip Health and Mobility for the Comox–Helmcken Greenway. The purpose of the study was to evaluate the health, mobility and social connectedness of older adults living along the greenway. Through questionnaires, activity monitors, street audits, and interviews, researchers found the following as important to seniors:

- Gardens and space for local artists to showcase their talent would increase traffic in the greenway
- Benches or street chairs along the greenway are essential
- Sidewalks have to be wheelchair accessible by being wide with smooth curb cuts
- Parking, cycling and pedestrian zones are essential

==== Proposed benefits of the Comox–Helmcken Greenway ====
- Improve community connectivity
- Encourage non-motorized transportation such as walking and cycling
- Improve safety for pedestrian and cyclists
- Improve aesthetics with gardens and trees
- Provide a place for social interactions

=== Masumi Mitsui Greenway ===
The Masumi Mitsui Greenway (formerly North Arm Trail) runs east-west, mainly along 59th Ave, in the southern part of the city. This 8 km trail connects major bus routes, five bike routes, and four other greenways and is partially complete. Construction began in 2011 with the Ontario Street section and it is complete to Vivian Drive as of 2012. The city wishes to take it further east but no concrete plans have yet been presented.

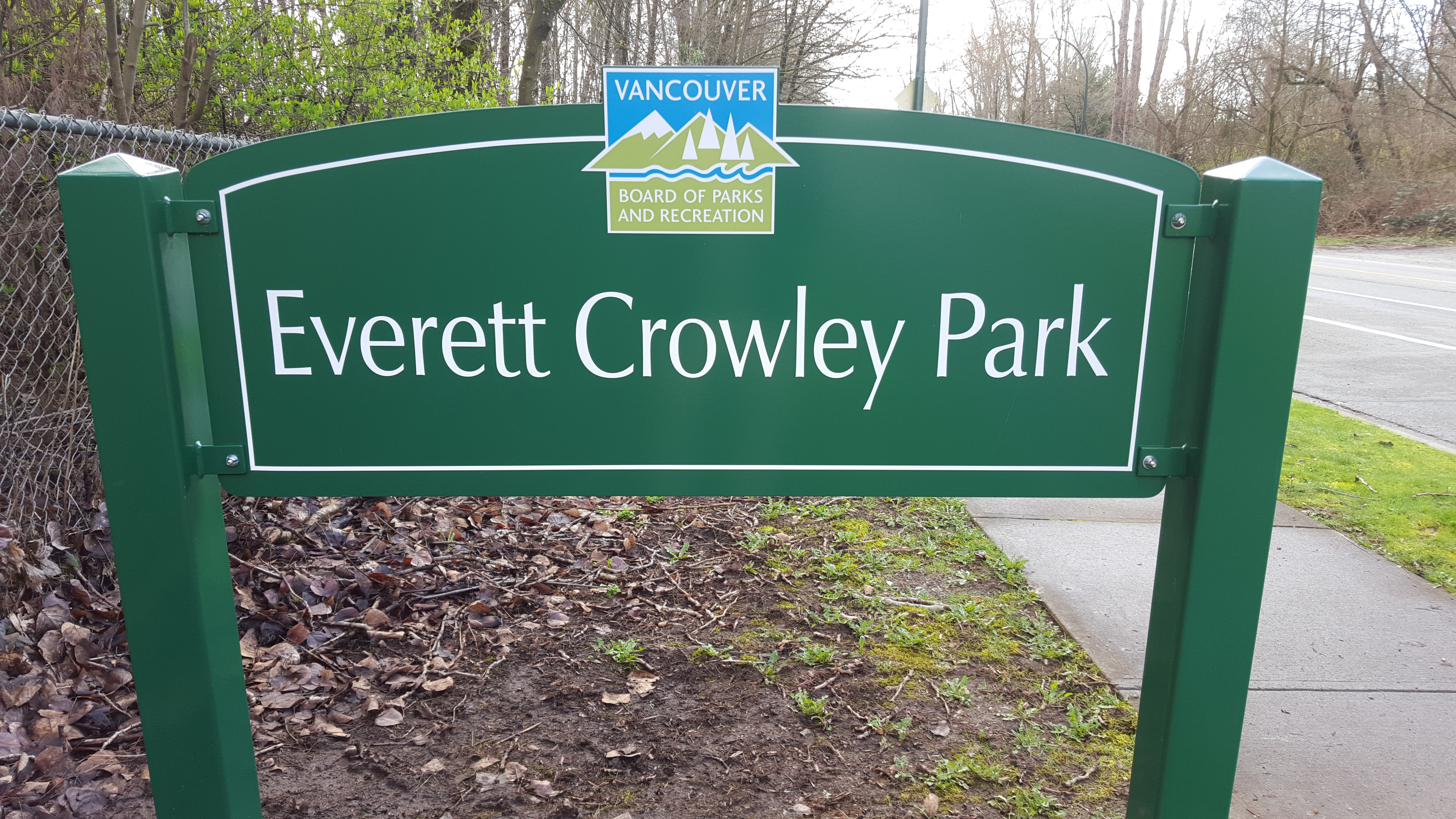
The Masumi Mitsui Greenway passes by Everett Crowley Park.

Along the Masumi Mitsui Greenway, the following landmarks and features can be found:

- Langara College, the Marpole–Oakridge Community Centre, several elementary and secondary schools, and the George Pearson Centre
- Fraserview Golf Course, Langara Golf Course, and a number of smaller parks
- Views of the Olympic Peninsula and Mount Baker

=== Ridgeway ===
The Ridgeway Greenway is 13 kilometres (8.1 mi) long and runs from west to east across the city. It starts at Pacific Spirit Park, and continues to Vancouver’s boundary with Burnaby, where it ends at Central Park. This greenway passes by attractions such as the VanDusen Botanical Garden and Queen Elizabeth Park. Pedestrians and cyclists do not share a path along the Ridgeway Greenway, except for a small section by Jones Park. For the majority of Ridgeway, cyclists ride on traffic-calmed streets together with vehicular traffic, while pedestrians use the sidewalks.

=== Seaside ===
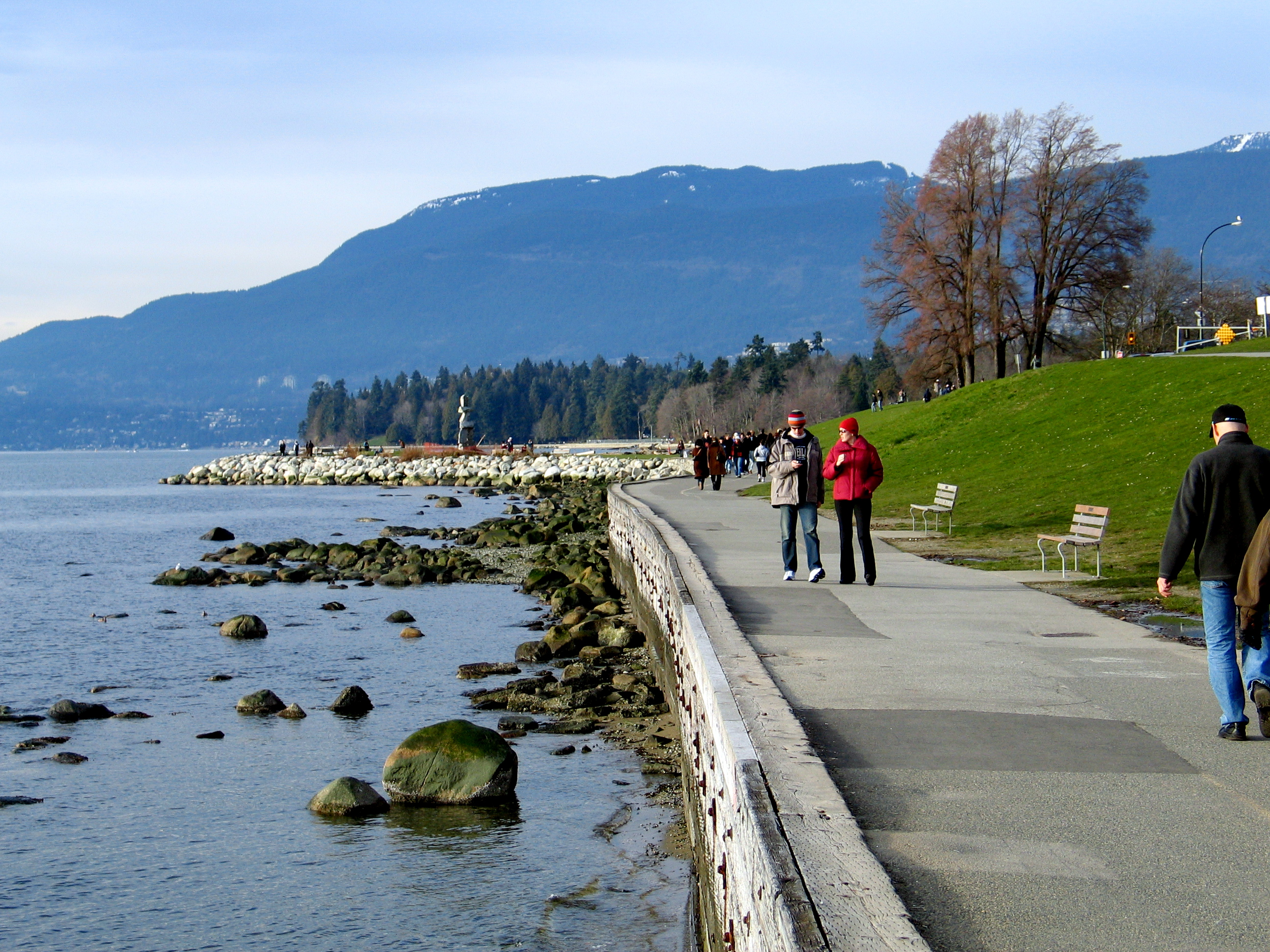
A section of the Seaside Greenway in Vancouver's West End.

The Seaside Greenway is the longest greenway in the City's network. It starts in Coal Harbour, includes Vancouver's seawall around Stanley Park, and extends around False Creek, then westward past Vanier Park towards Spanish Banks Beach. The section along the False Creek seawall is the oldest and one of the most popular greenways in the network, dating back to 1975. Both the North and South False Creek Seawalls are currently being altered by the City to encourage more potential users. Changes include separating paths between pedestrians and cyclists, as well as widening pathways, narrowing road space, adding wide boulevards, removing parking, restricting vehicular access and creating new signage. In the western section of the Seaside Greenway, a 2 km section is not at the seaside but within the Kitsilano neighbourhood along residential Point Grey Road. This section of the greenway is not yet completed. Changes to Point Grey Road to extend the greenway include substantial widening of sidewalks into the right-of-way, narrowing of the road, moving of utilities, regrading and repaving, tree and parking removal from the North side, boulevard installation and numerous motorist traffic diversion measures (including bike lanes and cul-de-sacs). The end goal of Vision Vancouver's Seaside Greenway project is a 28 km walking and cycling route, excluding motor vehicles, that begins at the Vancouver Convention Centre and ends at Spanish Banks Park.

=== Sea to River ===
The Sea to River Bikeway is a greenway which runs through West Burnaby between the Second Narrows Bridge (Burnaby Heights) and the South Slope neighbourhood on the north shore of the Fraser River. The route connects with the Spirit Trail (a greenway in North Vancouver), intersects with the Central Valley Greenway at the corner of Gilmore and Still Creek Avenue and the BC Parkway at Central Park, and links with the Marine Way bike routes (shoulder bike lanes).

Along the route, greenway users can pass the following locations:

- Gilmore Station
- Burnaby Hospital
- Wesburn Community Centre
- Patterson station
- Metrotown

== Criticisms ==
=== Arbutus ===
Following the sale of the Arbutus rail land to the City in 2016, there was criticism from citizens and disagreements on how to proceed with the Arbutus Corridor re-design and use it as a green transportation pathway. The City had started paving a temporary asphalt path in the summer of 2016 in the hopes of encouraging the public to use the corridor more often, in preparation for public consultations that were launched in January 2017. However, some citizens raised concerns over the temporary asphalt, citing issues related to rain run-off and the potential of increased collisions and accidents between pedestrians and cyclists sharing the paved path. As of April 2017, the paved pathway's painted lines that separate pedestrians and cyclists seem to create a 2/3 bicycle to 1/3 pedestrian split of the available pathway space.

=== North Arm Trail ===
The construction of bike lanes for the North Arm Trail met with criticism and opposition from residents while it was being completed. Local residents objected to the construction of a bike lane, citing the safety concern of the bike lane being too close to sidewalks, as well as the loss of street parking.

=== Seaside: Point Grey Road ===
In 2013, some citizens opposed the City's decision to expend $6 million on the Phase 1 closure (at Macdonald Street) for only 8 blocks of Point Grey Road, redesignating it from a popular commuter motorist arterial for all users to a bike-prioritized path with all commuter motorist traffic removed. Another bike path already existed on nearby 3rd Avenue. Despite the cost and restricted use concerns, the Vision-Party-majority City Council proceeded with its inland extension of the False Creek seawall and greenway along local, residential Point Grey Road. Council's decision was primarily for the safety of cyclists by removing the high volumes of commuting motorists. The City Council opted to channel the Seaside Greenway inland to Point Grey Road rather than continue the seawall at the seaside, which would have involved negotiating the riparian rights of homeowners and ecological considerations of foreshore wildlife. Increased citizen opposition and outrage arose in 2016 when the City opted to spend another $6.4 million on Phase 2 -- extensive sidewalk widening and road narrowing—on the same 8 blocks of Point Grey Road. In addition to the objections about cost, the Phase 2 City-engineered design (by David Rawsthorne) was determined by independent Road Safety engineers to be redundant and unsafe (Geoffrey Ho Engineering Consultants Inc.), likely to cause more casualties from the ingress/egress of 80 residential driveways. Yet, the Vision-Party-led City Council, which had rejected (as too dramatic, expensive and challenging for driveway safety) the option in 2013 (Phase 1) of reconfiguring the road by using the right-of-way, decided in 2016 (Phase 2) to implement this reconfiguration despite the high cost, substantial changes to the local neighbourhood and road use, safety risks and ongoing public opposition (Video of City Engineer Jerry Dobrovolny at City Council Vote on the project on July 25, 2013, tape counter 25:35). The NPA Party members on Council (in minority) all voted against the Phase 2 design. In addition, other citizens disapprove of Phase 2's over-engineering, with its extensive concrete paving over old growth trees and green space, which may endanger the biodiversity and ecological sustainability of the neighbourhood.

Construction of the extension of the Seaside Greenway along Point Grey Road is underway but not completed. In 2017, citizens continue to criticize the project for the City's lack of public consultation and exclusion of resident-stakeholder input, the Vision Council's bias of increasing space primarily for cyclists, the unsafe engineering design with no delineation of safe or equitable space by user mode, and the high expense on redundant infrastructure. Resident community associations have filed formal complaints of misconduct with the Association of Professional Engineers and Geoscientists of BC (APEGBC) against City of Vancouver transportation engineers for the misrepresentation and lack of safety of the Phase 2 design. These community associations have requested that the City of Vancouver, APEGBC and the Insurance Corporation of BC (ICBC) conduct a Road Safety framework of safety studies, such as ICBC's Road Safety Road Improvement Program, to assess by evidence-based methodology the risks of Phase 2 prior to the continuation of construction. To date (May 2017), Phase 2 implementation has not been halted, and resident associations have not received confirmation that a framework of safety studies will be conducted prior to the ongoing implementation. Instead, Vision Council and City engineers agreed on May 17, 2017 to forego reports to Council as well as Council deliberations by turning over decision-making to City engineers for all city road, sidewalk and traffic management alterations at the discretion of City engineers. By limiting public consultation on road projects, the Vision Party can speed up and extend transformations to Vancouver roadways citywide as Complete Streets. Members of the public opposed the May 17th delegation of extra authority to City engineers as undemocratic.

=== Sea to River: Gilmore section ===
The Sea to River bikeway is often criticized for its lack of safe cycling infrastructure along part of the Gilmore Diversion and Gilmore Avenue. The area between Lougheed Highway and Highway 1 does not have very many quiet, 'bike friendly' streets to use, and although Gilmore (a relatively busy street) does have some sections equipped with a shared pathway, cyclists are still expected to ride alongside heavy car traffic in several areas between Halifax Street and Canada Way.
