= Lochdale, Burnaby =

Neighourhood in Burnaby, British Columbia

Aerial view of Lochdale, Burnaby in 2026

Lochdale is a single-family neighbourhood in the northeastern part of Burnaby, Canada, near Burnaby Mountain. It lies between Kensington Ave to the west and Duthie Ave to the east. Hastings Street marks its northern limits while Halifax Street closes the rectangle in the south. Additionally, a large hillside residential area between Burnaby Mountain Parkway and Greystone Drive also belongs to Lochdale. Several major thoroughfares connecting north and south run through this neighbourhood - the earlier mentioned Kensington Avenue, Duthie Avenue, and Sperling Avenue.

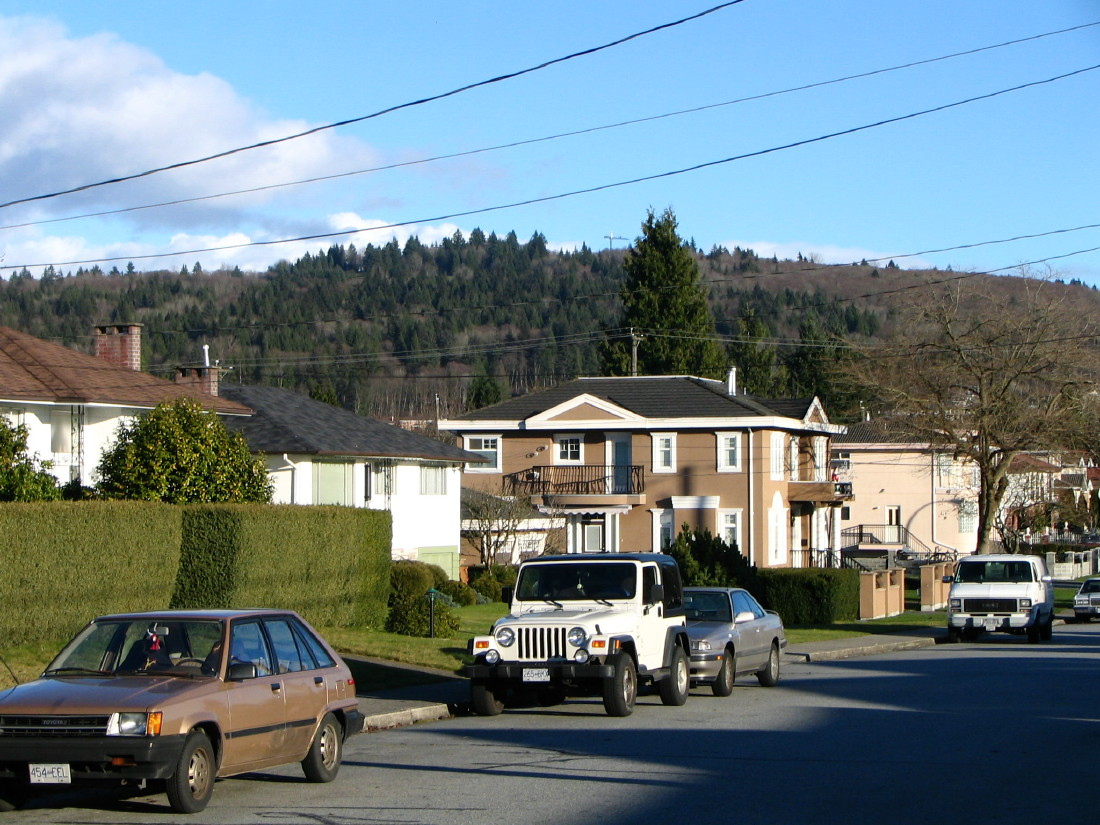
Aubrey Street near Sperling Avenue looking east towards Burnaby Mountain

Similar to neighbouring Parkcrest and Montecito (also known as Sperling-Broadway), Lochdale's elevation gradually subsides southwards where it approaches Burnaby Lake which gave this old neighbourhood its Scottish name.

== History ==
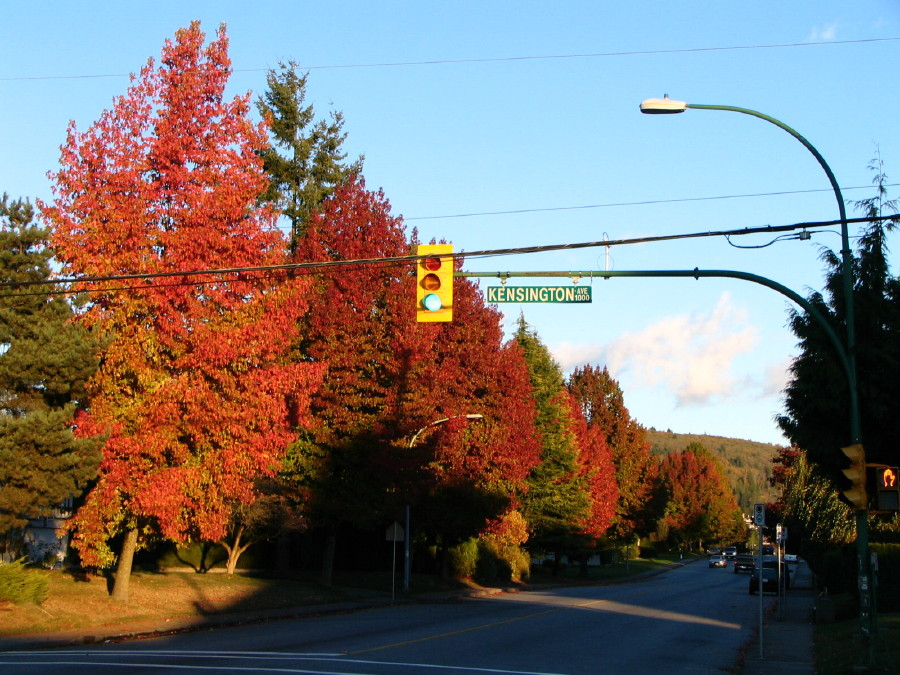
Fall colours in Lochdale. Curtis Street just east of Kensington Avenue, with Burnaby Mountain in the distance.

The Lochdale district was founded at Hastings Street and Sperling Avenue in 1912 and absorbed many immigrants of different European backgrounds before World War 2, whose children and grandchildren still live in the area. The Lochdale Community Hall at the corner of Hastings St and Sperling Ave is Burnaby's last remaining early community hall building and is protected as a heritage site by the Council since 1992. The Hall was constructed with volunteer labour and donated materials in 1925 through the efforts of the Lochdale Social Club. It is rented for special occasions.

== Housing ==
The area is mostly single-family except the Hastings St area where some low-income housing already exists.

== Transport and amenities ==
Kensington Square shopping centre at Hastings Street and Kensington Avenue

Sperling–Burnaby Lake station of the Millennium Line is located directly to the south of this neighbourhood, across the Lougheed Highway. The area is well served by public transit with buses providing connections to all three shopping malls in this part of Burnaby - Kensington Square, Lougheed Mall and Brentwood Mall.

Kensington Square (a.k.a. Kensington Plaza) at Hastings Street and Kensington Ave is a popular shopping centre with a number of shops and services and a post-office. A stretch of Hastings between Kensington Ave and Clare Ave also has a number of small shops and restaurants.

== Education ==
Burnaby North Secondary School

There are two elementary schools in this area - Lochdale Community and Westridge. Burnaby North Secondary School serves this and neighbouring areas.

== Ethnic flavour ==
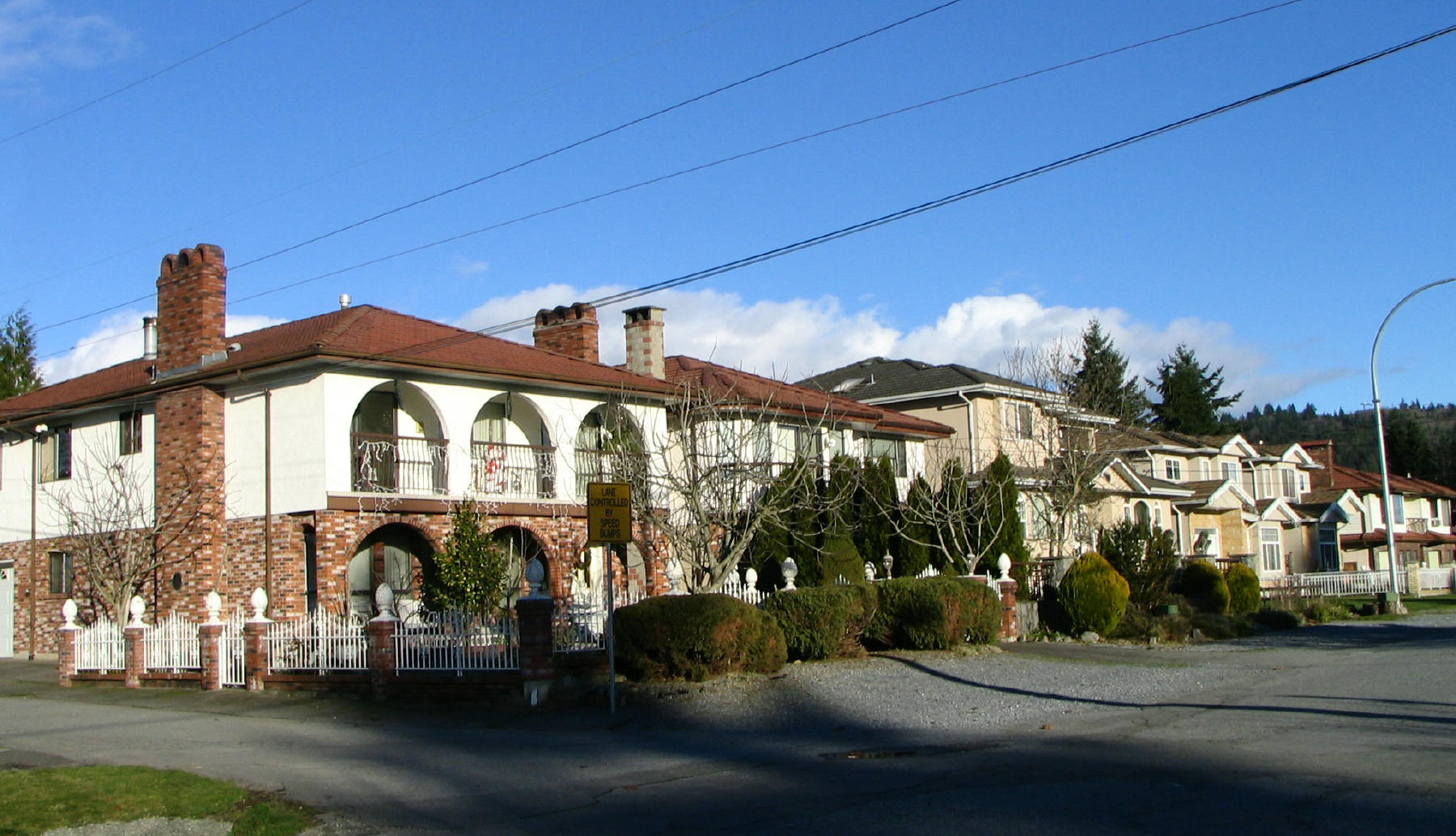
A typical street in Lochdale

Although Korean and Chinese population is highly visible in the entire North Burnaby area, Lochdale's distinct Italian flavour still demonstrates itself in its attractive residential architecture and gardening styles which are also very similar to those of Parkcrest's.

== Parks and activities ==
There are a few parks in the area - Sumas Park and Sperling Park in the south, Lochdale Park off Cliff Ave, and Halifax Park on Halifax Avenue which has a remaining stand of old trees right in the heart of the neighbourhood. Kensington Park with its pitch and putt is steps away.

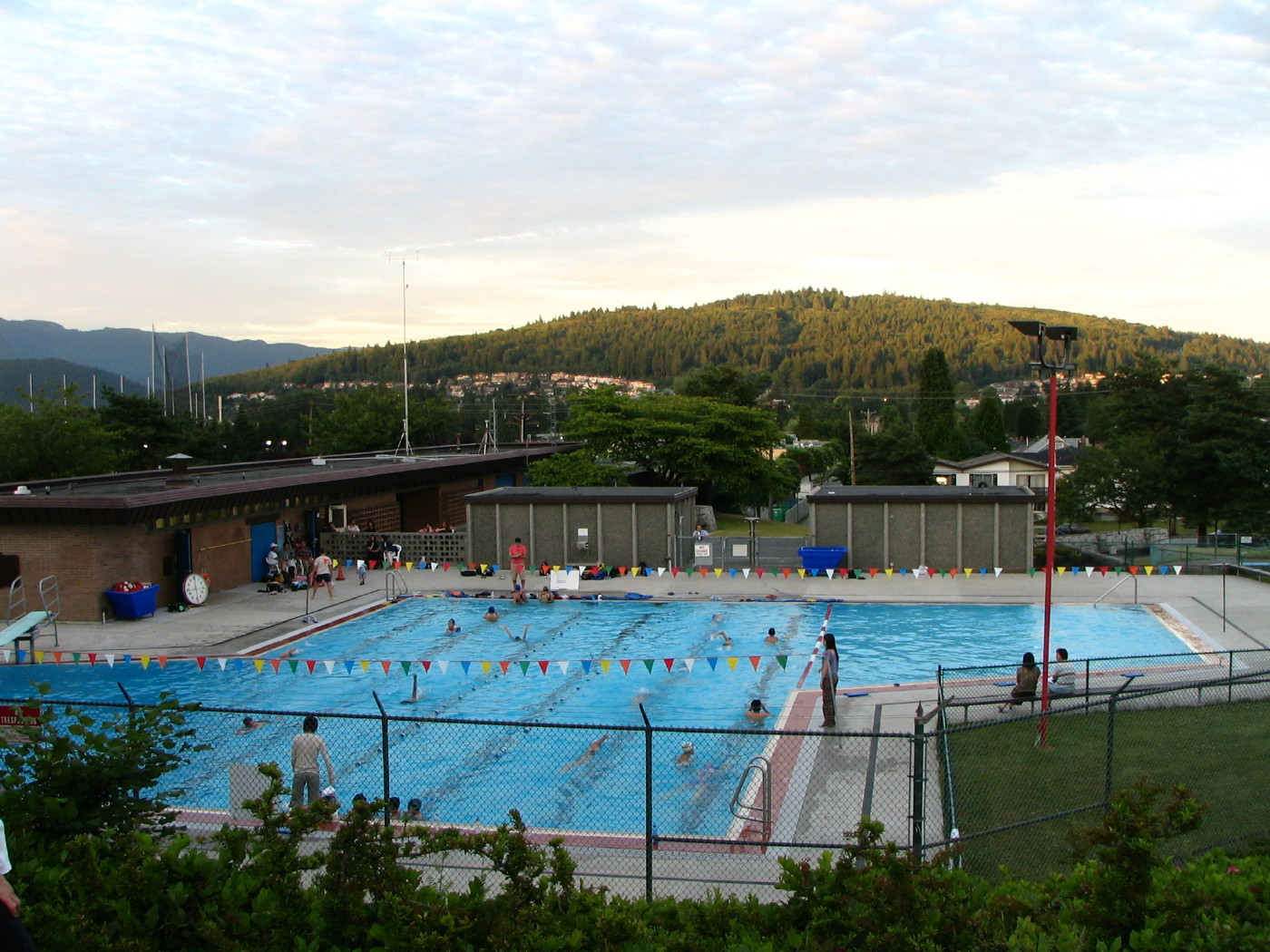
An outdoor swimming pool at Kensington Avenue and Hastings Street

An outdoor swimming pool is located on a small hill opposite Kensington Square Shopping Centre, just across Kensington Avenue.

A bicycle overpass built in the mid-1990s over high-traffic Hastings Street allows cyclists to travel north to the picturesque shores of Burrard Inlet.
