= CVG =

CVG may refer to:

== Businesses ==
- Corporación Venezolana de Guayana, a mining conglomerate (formed 1960)
- Convergys, a software company (1998–2018)
- Carrill Aviation, an airline

== Places ==
- Central Valley Greenway, a route in Canada
- Cincinnati/Northern Kentucky International Airport, United States

== Other uses ==
- Cutis verticis gyrata, a condition of the scalp
- Computer and Video Games, a British gaming magazine
- Coriolis vibratory gyroscope
