= Montecito =

Montecito may refer to:

- Montecito, Burnaby, a neighbourhood in Burnaby, British Columbia, Canada
- Montecito, California, a census-designated place in Santa Barbara County, California
- Montecito (processor), the codename used to designate a revision of the Intel Itanium 2 processor

== See also ==
- Montecito Casino, the fictional Montecito Resort and Casino in the popular television series Las Vegas
- The Montecito Picture Company, a film production company
