= Squint Lake =

Lake in Burnaby, British Columbia, Canada

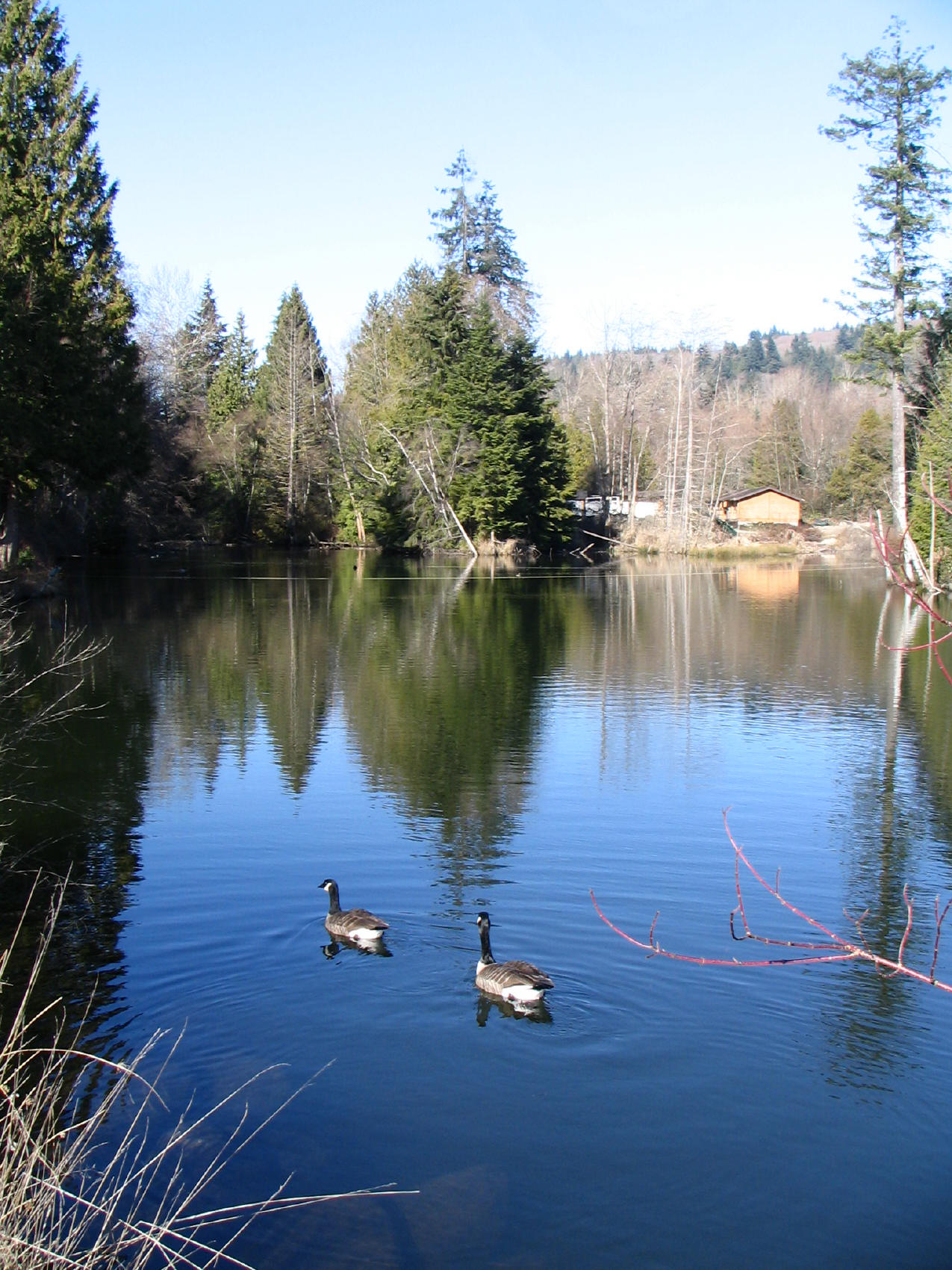

- Location within British Columbia
- Location: Burnaby, British Columbia
- Coordinates: 49.264028°N 122.941662°W
- Primary inflows: Eagle Creek
- Primary outflows: Eagle Creek
- Basin countries: Canada

Squint Lake is a small lake in Burnaby, British Columbia, Canada. It is located southwest of Burnaby Mountain. Squint Lake is surrounded by Burnaby Mountain Golf Course. Squint Lake Park is to the north of the lake.

Eagle Creek flows into Squint Lake from the north and continues south eventually flowing into Burnaby Lake. There are two tiny ponds on either side of Squint Lake.

According to a map and materials by Heritage Advisory Committee and Environment and Waste Management Committee of the City of Burnaby (1993), Eagle Creek is fed by a large watershed which drains the slopes of Burnaby Mountain, and at one time included a large marsh and beaver pond located in the old Lochdale district. In 1910, when the Vancouver real-estate firm of Ross and Shaw tried to sell their new subdivision on the mountain, they printed ads in the Vancouver Daily Province which announced: "Adjoining this desirable property is the beautiful Quinte Lake, where it is proposed to erect a tourist hotel." Apparently local residents thought the name was hilarious and much too grandiose a description for a beaver pond. Instead, Lochdale residents joked that "...you had to squint to see it" and the name Squint Lake stuck."

Residents enjoyed swimming in the pond and in the winter people came from miles around to skate. However, later developments drained the swamp and the pond slowly disappeared from the landscape. Its memory is commemorated in Squint Lake Park.

Lake access is at Phillips Avenue at Woodbrook Place, across from Greystone Shopping Mall.

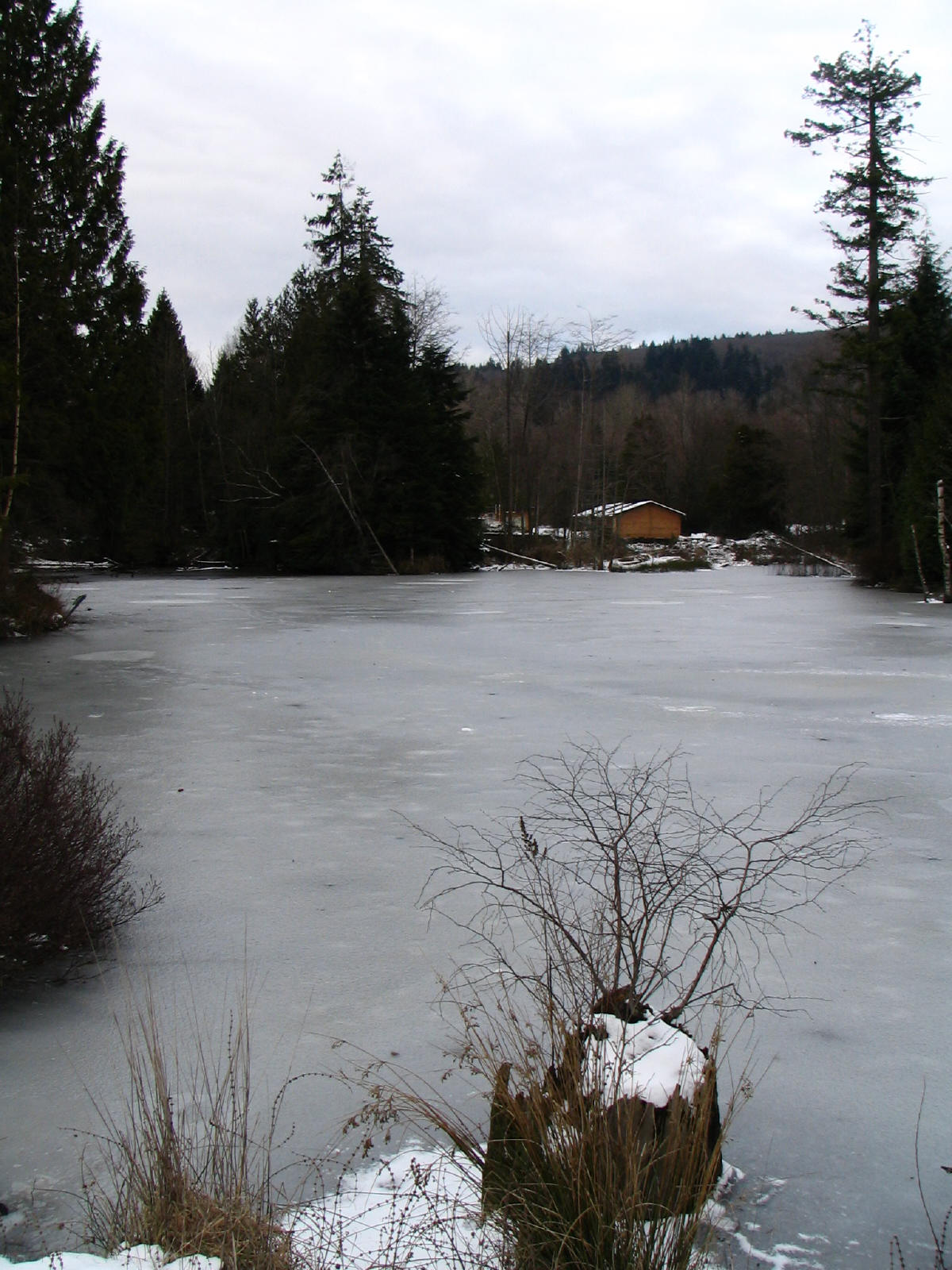
Cold January 2005 at Squint Lake

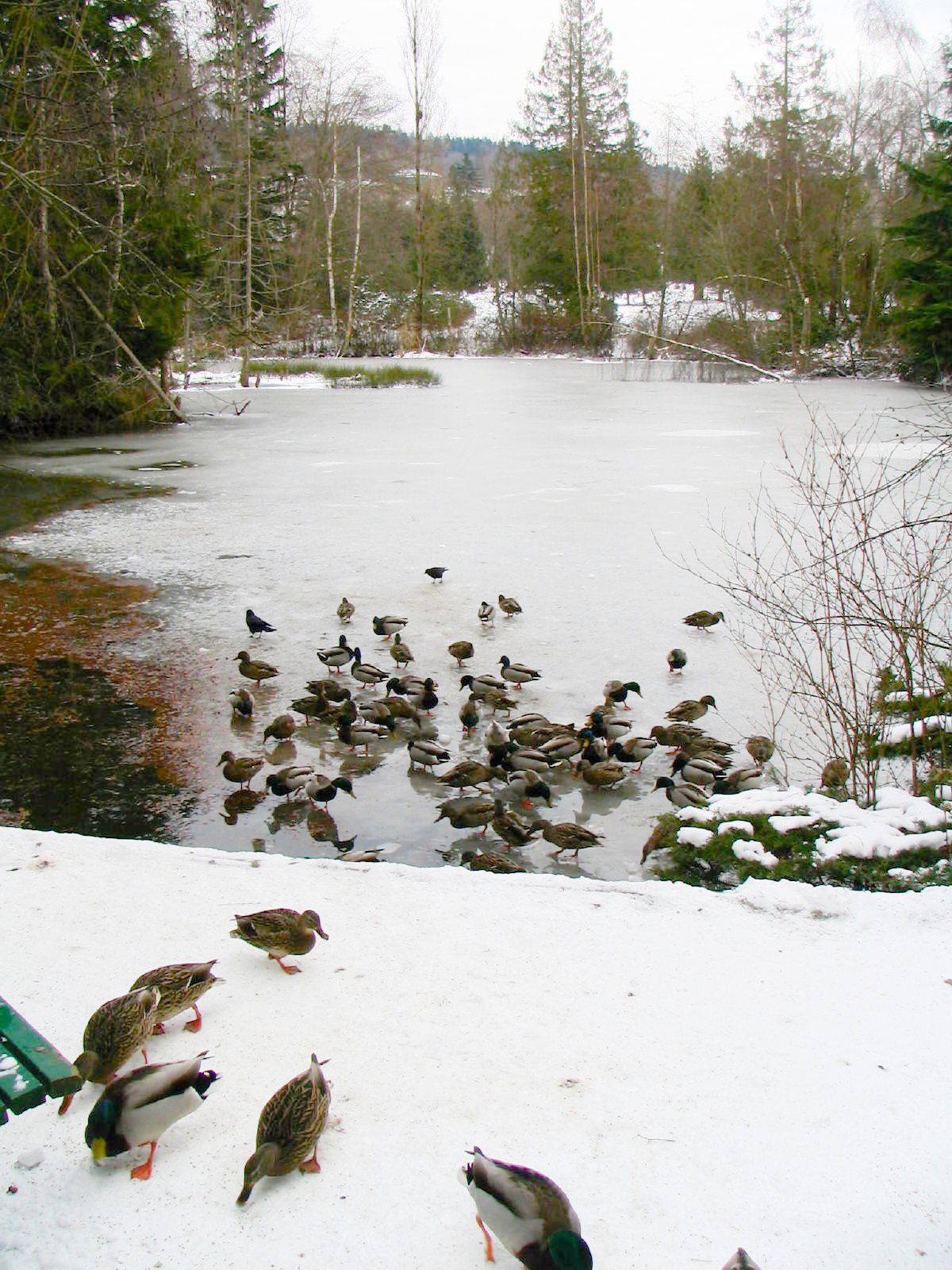
Squint Lake in January 2005

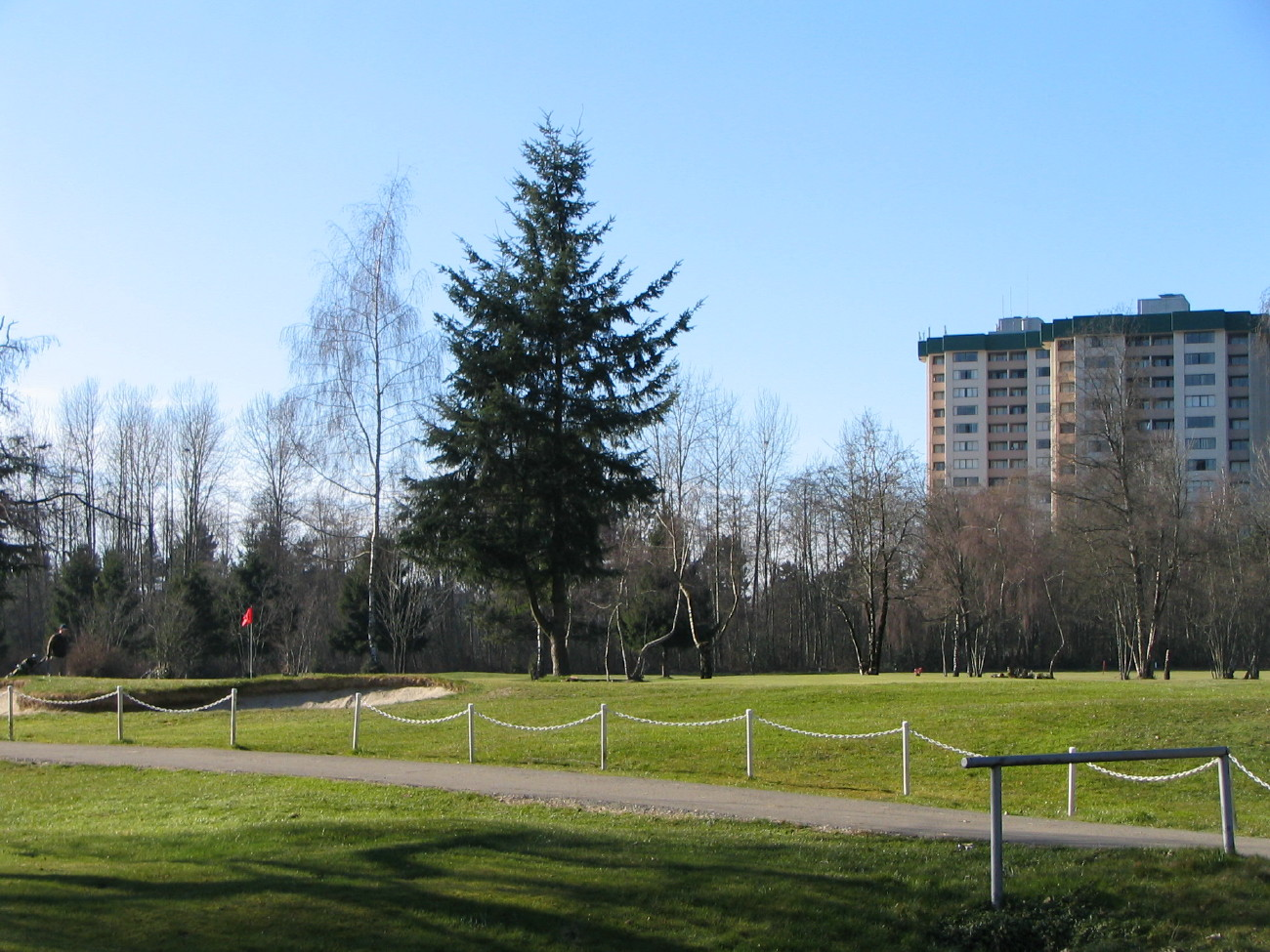
Burnaby Mountain Golf Course surrounds Squint Lake. Montecito Towers in the background.

== See also ==
- List of lakes of British Columbia
