= Eagle Creek (Burnaby) =

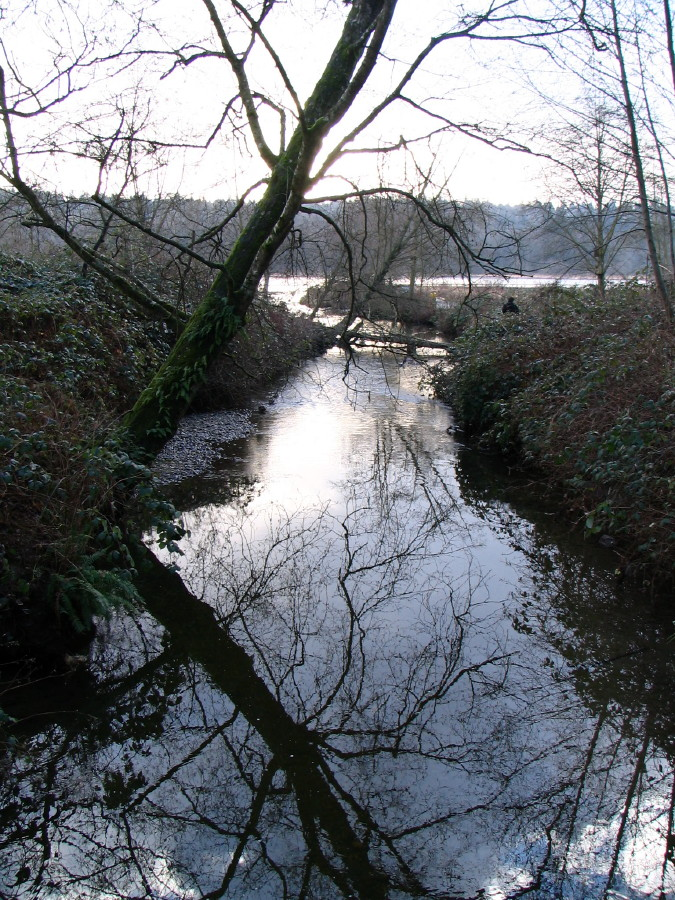
- Eagle Creek joining Burnaby Lake

- Location within British Columbia
- Location: Burnaby, British Columbia, Canada
- Coordinates: 49°15′59″N 122°56′34″W
- Type: Creek
- Primary inflows: Streams from Burnaby Mountain
- Primary outflows: Burnaby Lake

Eagle Creek is one of the most important creeks in Burnaby, British Columbia, Canada. It begins on Burnaby Mountain where it is fed by a large watershed, runs through Montecito and the nearby Squint Lake, and eventually flows into Burnaby Lake.

== Course ==
Eagle Creek begins as many tiny streams that drain the west and southwest sides of Burnaby Mountain. The lands on the mountain are protected as part of the Burnaby Mountain Conservation Area. Below the protected area, those tributaries of Eagle Creek that emerge from the forest flow through land that has been developed for residential purposes. At times the creek is culverted, at times it is channelized, and at other times it is allowed to flow almost freely. Here the dominant flora are those typical of disturbed sites in the Fraser Valley.

The various tributaries are gathered together above and below Squint Lake, on lands which are currently the site of the Burnaby Mountain Golf Course. The collected waters of Eagle Creek are culverted under Broadway, and descend from the culvert into a deep ravine that runs uninterrupted to the Lougheed Highway. Aside from a service road at the bottom, and some concrete stormwater management infrastructure, the ravine is undeveloped. The flora there include many of the same plants found on the mountain, with the exception of some of the more sensitive species, and with the addition of some exotics that have presumably escaped from residential properties along the upper edge.

Below the highway, Eagle Creek runs through Charles Rummel Park, and then once again enters a residential zone, where it is mostly channelized, and occasionally culverted. Below Winston Street, the creek enters Warner Loat Park, where it flows in a bed that parallels Piper Avenue all the way into Burnaby Lake Regional Park. Once in the park, the waters of the creek do not have far to go until they are poured into Burnaby Lake, a short walk south of the Nature House.

== Ecology ==
The entirety of the Eagle Creek watershed is in the coastal western hemlock biogeoclimatic zone of British Columbia. The protected lands of Burnaby Mountain, as well as the lands of Burnaby Lake Regional Park are forested with a second growth forest that primarily consists of bigleaf maple, red alder, western hemlock, western redcedar, and Douglas-fir, with an underbrush of salmonberry, Indian plum, red elderberry, and other shrubs and herbs. Mammals found here include the Douglas squirrel, black-tailed deer, coyote, and raccoon. Many birds and amphibians also inhabit the watershed.

In areas which have been converted by residential development, exotic and invasive species predominate, including English ivy and Himalayan blackberry.

Salmon are a native part of Eagle Creek's ecosystem. Today, the fish are encouraged and protected by the actions of the Eagle Creek Streamkeepers.

== Toxic spills ==
Eagle Creek has experienced a number of spills in residential areas that caused serious damage to the trout and salmon population, most recently in the summer of 2006.

== Photo gallery ==
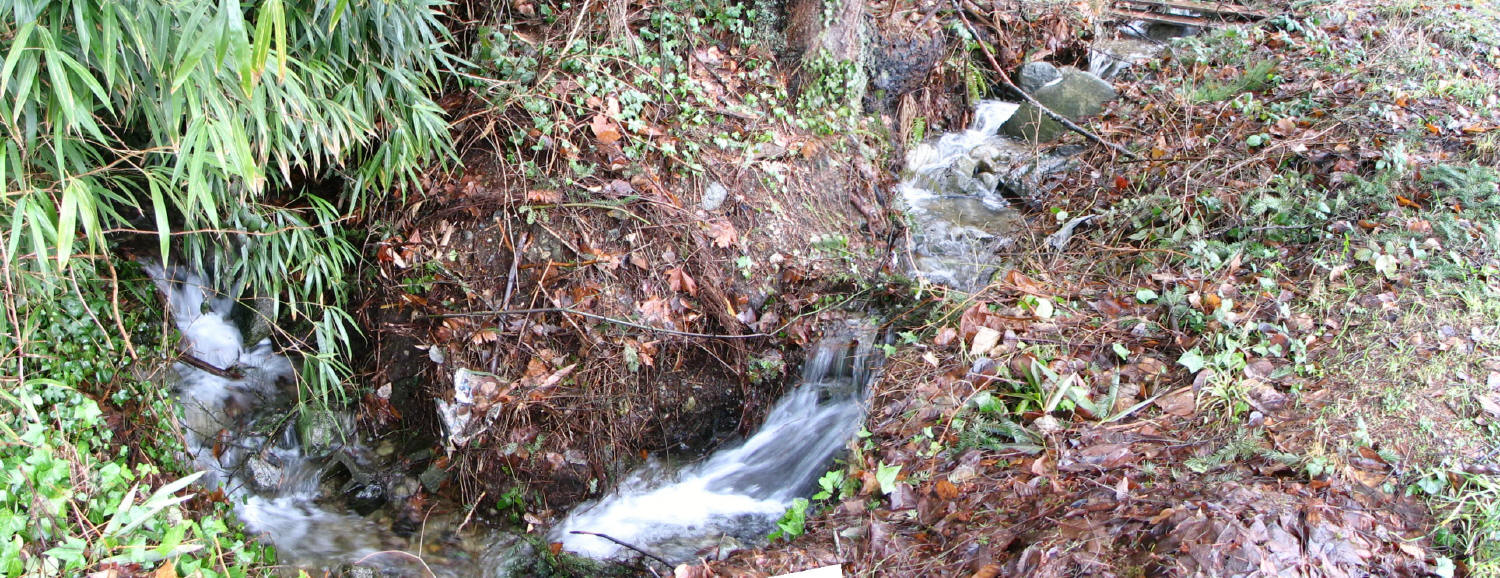
Upper Eagle Creek tributaries at the end of Aubrey St.

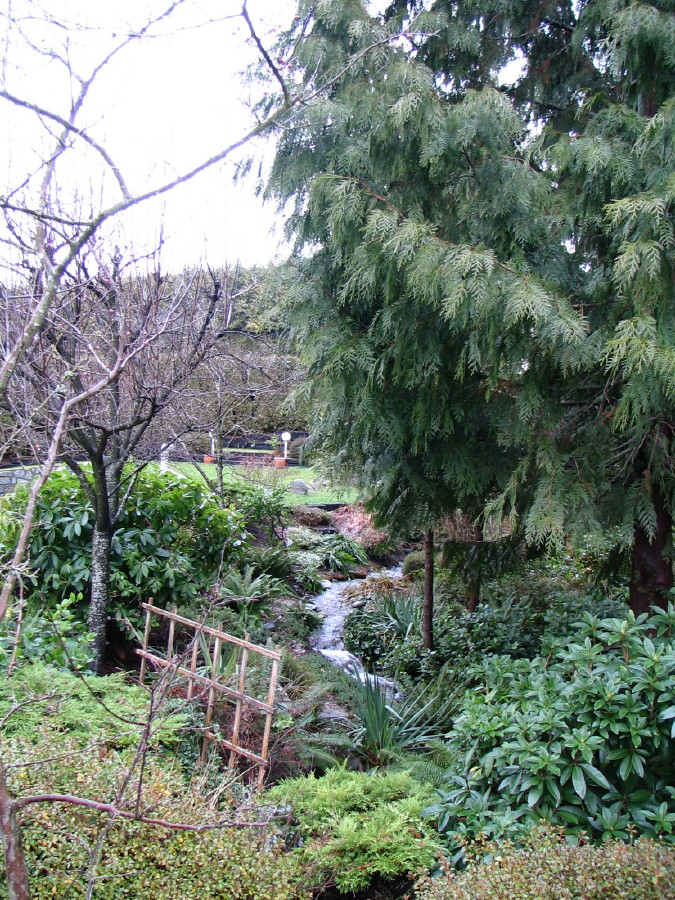
An Eagle Creek tributary north of Birkdale Pl.

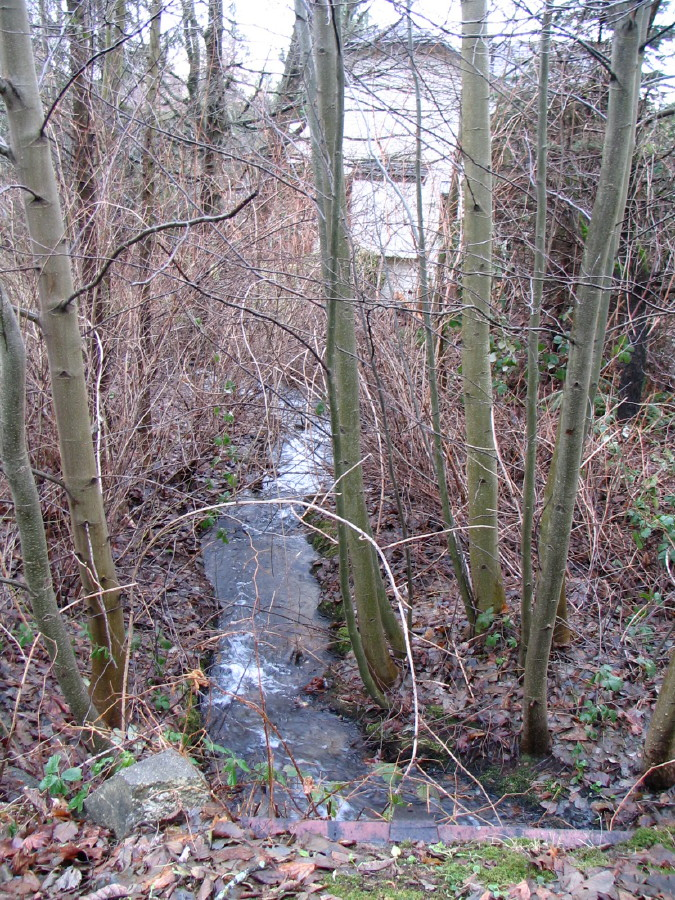
An Eagle Creek tributary south of Birkdale Pl.

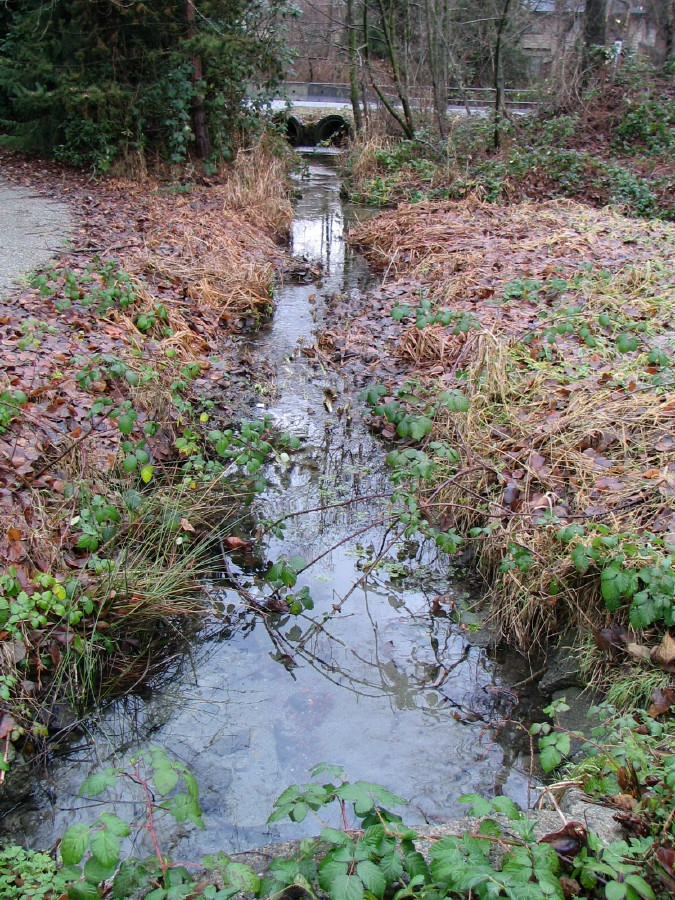
An Eagle Creek tributary at Ednor Cr. just north of Greystone Dr., Montecito

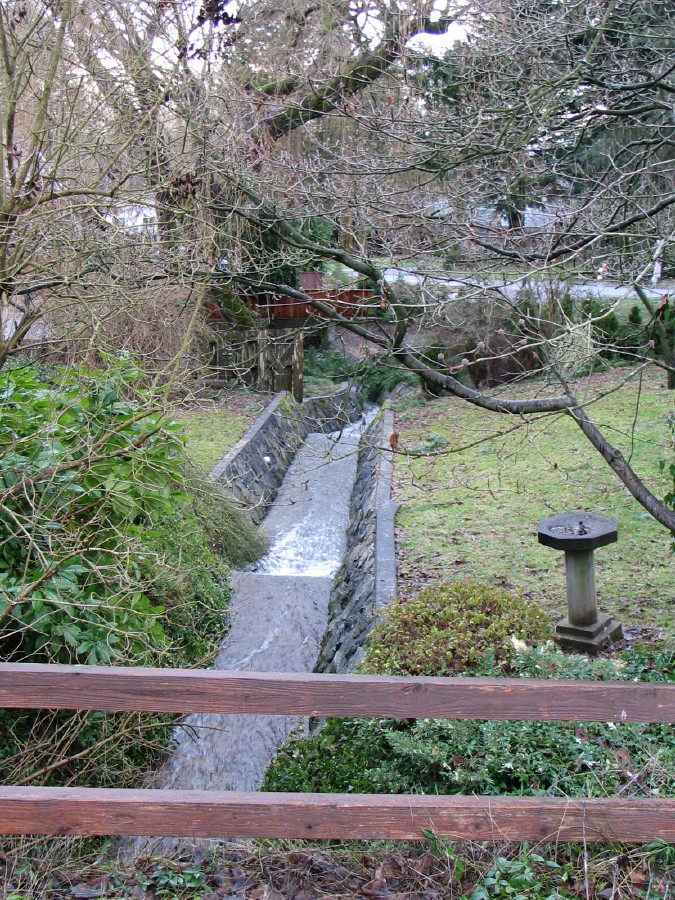
An Eagle Creek tributary in a lane off Augusta Ave.

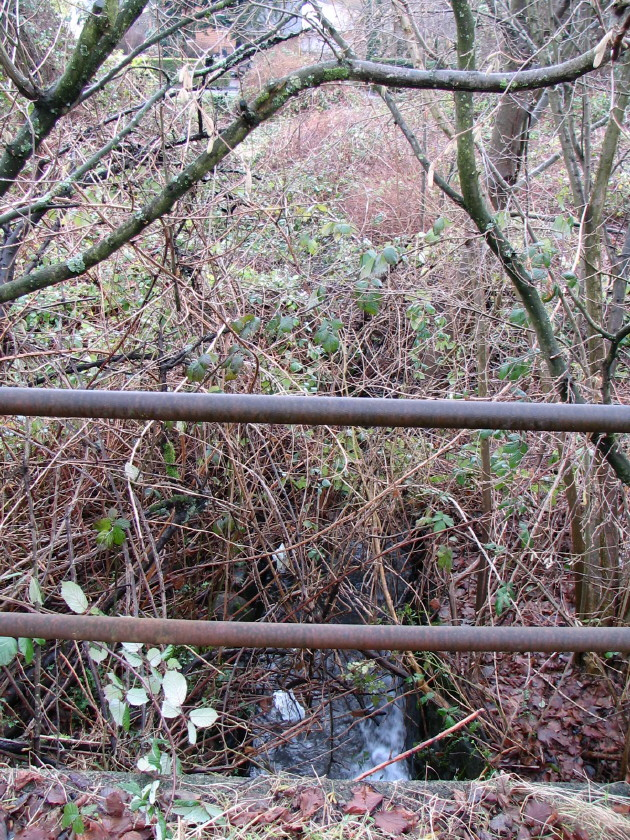
An Eagle Creek tributary at Curtis St. and Augusta Ave.

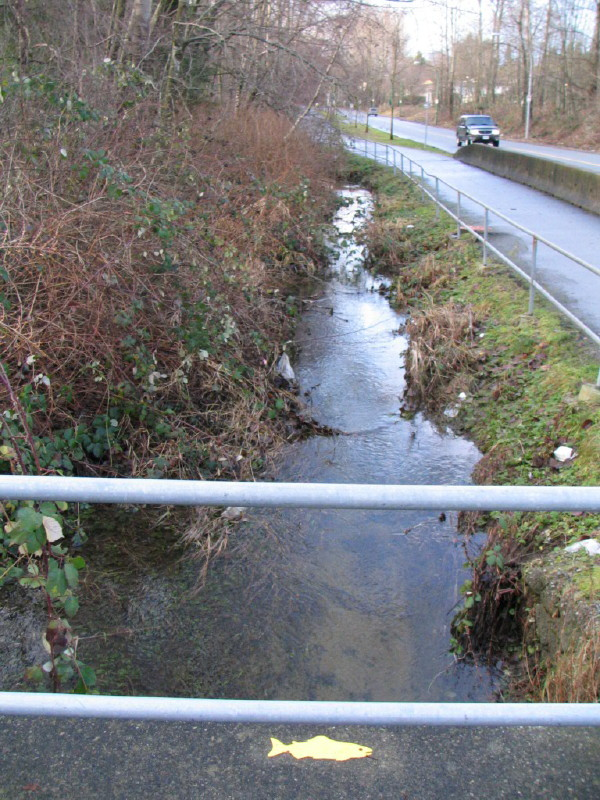
Eagle Creek at Greystone Dr.

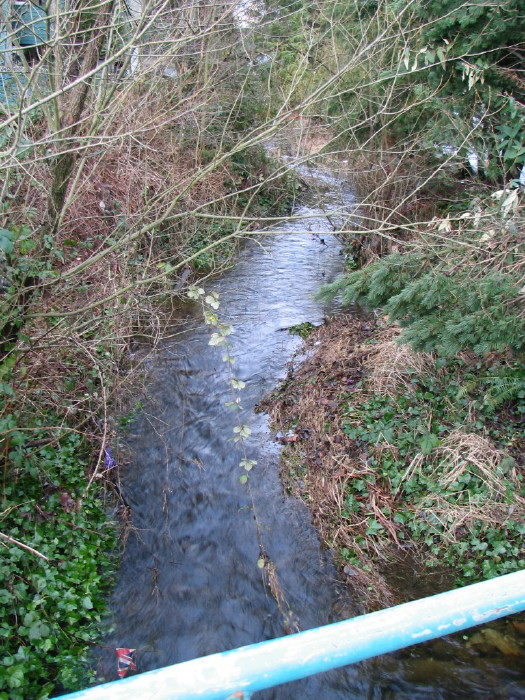
Eagle Creek at Phillips Ave. and Woodbrook Pl., near Greystone Mall

== See also ==
- List of rivers of British Columbia
