= Lake City Way =

Lake City Way may refer to:

- Lake City Way station, a station on the Millennium Line of the SkyTrain system in Metro Vancouver, Canada
- Lake City Way (Seattle), a street in Seattle, Washington, United States
