= Gilmore station =

Gilmore station may refer to:

- Gilmore station (LRT), a rapid transit station in Metro Manila, Philippines
- Gilmore station (SkyTrain), a rapid transit station in Metro Vancouver, Canada
