= Central Valley Greenway =

Pedestrian and cyclist route in British Columbia, Canada

Coordinates: 49.260914°N 122.98177°W

- Length: 24 km (15 mi)
- Location: Metro Vancouver, British Columbia, Canada
- Established: June 27, 2009
- Designation: Regional greenway
- Trailheads: Science World; New Westminster waterfront
- Use: Walking, cycling, wheeling, commuting, inline skating
- Difficulty: Easy
- Season: Year-round
- Sights: False Creek, Science World, Commercial Drive, Burnaby Lake Regional Park, Hume Park, New Westminster Quay
- Hazards: Road crossings; some sections shared with motor traffic
- Surface: Asphalt, concrete, boardwalk, gravel
- Maintained by: TransLink, City of Vancouver, City of Burnaby, City of New Westminster
- Website: vancouver.ca/streets-transportation/central-valley.aspx

The Central Valley Greenway (CVG) is a 24-kilometre pedestrian and cyclist route in Metro Vancouver, running from Science World in Vancouver to New Westminster, through Burnaby. The greenway officially opened on June 27, 2009, with opening celebrations, guided bike tours, and walking tours on sections of the route. Despite its official opening, some sections are complete on an interim basis and are anticipated to be upgraded in the future.

The total cost of the greenway was approximately $24 million. Funding was provided by the government of Canada, the province of British Columbia, TransLink, Metro Vancouver, and the cities of Vancouver, Burnaby, and New Westminster. The greenway was catalyzed by a grant given to Better Environmentally Sound Transportation (BEST) by Vancity Credit Union, in recognition of its transportation advocacy efforts, such as advocating for the construction of the greenway.

== Route ==
The greenway provides a safe corridor for commuters and a green route to local parks. In the Burnaby and New Westminster sections, the route runs near the SkyTrain's Millennium Line. The route follows the Central Valley, providing a remarkably flat route through a hilly region. Most sections of the trail, a combination of off-road paths and quality on-street routes, are suitable for many users (pedestrians, commuter and recreational cyclists, wheelchair users, in-line skaters, etc.). In Burnaby there are some gravel paths less suitable for in-line skating. Sections of the trail in Burnaby passing through Burnaby Lake Regional Park (pedestrian route) and along the Brunette River are open during daylight hours only.

Along the way, the Central Valley Greenway connects major destinations, including

- The False Creek Seawall
- Great Northern Way Campus
- Vancouver Community College (VCC)
- Commercial Drive
- Burnaby Lake Sports Complex
- Burnaby Lake Regional Park
- Hume Park
- Sapperton
- Royal Columbian Hospital
- Downtown New Westminster
- 13 SkyTrain stations

== See also ==
Vancouver Greenway Network
