= Better Environmentally Sound Transportation =

Better Environmentally Sound Transportation (BEST)
- Company type: Non-Profit
- Industry: Sustainable Transportation
- Founded: 1991
- Headquarters: Vancouver, British Columbia
- Area served: British Columbia
- Products: Sustainable Transportation
- Website: best.bc.ca

Better Environmentally Sound Transportation (BEST) is a Vancouver-based charity focused on promoting walking, cycling, public transit, and other forms of sustainable transportation in Metro Vancouver. The organization was founded in 1991 and has several active projects as of 2019.

== History ==
BEST has undergone numerous changes since its formation. Originally, it started off as a non-profit organization that focused on promoting cycling as a sustainable form of transportation. Through time, its evolved to advocate and promote all forms of sustainable transportation. The organization started Our Community Bikes, Vancouver's first do-it-yourself bike store which includes a full service mechanic and retail bike shop, a club for youth to learn bike skills, as well as Pedals for the People which provides refurbished bikes to people in need. BEST is well known for its role in development of the Central Valley Greenway, a 24-km long pedestrian and cyclist route running from Vancouver to New Westminster through Burnaby. The Central Valley Greenway was kickstarted when Vancity Credit Union awarded BEST with a $1 million grant to develop the project.

== Programs ==
=== The Bicycle Valet ===
Founded in 2006, The Bicycle Valet operates free, safe bicycle parking services at festivals, events, Vancouver Whitecaps games, and many other happenings around the Metro Vancouver area. The program promotes cycling as an environmentally friendly transportation option and as an alternative to driving.

=== Senior Transportation Access and Resources (STAR) ===
STAR (Seniors Transportation Access and Resources) started in 2011. They collaborate with senior-focused organizations across B.C. to improve and develop transportation services for older adults. Its largest project includes establishing Seniors on the Move, a project focused on addressing social isolation that many senior citizen experience. Coming out of this project, the Seniors Transportation Hub and Hotline was created in collaboration with bc211.

=== Parkbus ===
Parkbus expanded to British Columbia in 2016. Parkbus provides accessible transportation options to various National and Provincial Parks across Canada. In B.C., destinations include Golden Ears Provincial Park, Garibaldi Provincial Park, Joffre Lakes Provincial Park, and Cypress Provincial Park. One of their most popular programs, ActiveDays, leads group hikes in nature and aspires to create outdoor communities.

=== The Commuter Challenge ===
The Commuter Challenge in BC was created in 1997 as part of Canadian Environment Week. The competition runs annually during the first week of June and encourages people coming to and from work to walk, cycle, take transit, ride share, or work from home. Participants can track their commutes and achievements online.

=== Living Streets ===
Living Streets is an environmental education program aimed at increasing civic participation in youth and new Canadians. Participants in the educational presentation focus on daily transportation choices, safety, and sustainability of communities. As community ambassadors, participants go on “street audits” to analyze the infrastructure and identify barriers to walking, cycling, and public transportation.
