= Montecito, Burnaby =

Neighourhood in Burnaby, British Columbia

Coordinates: 49.265°N 122.953°W

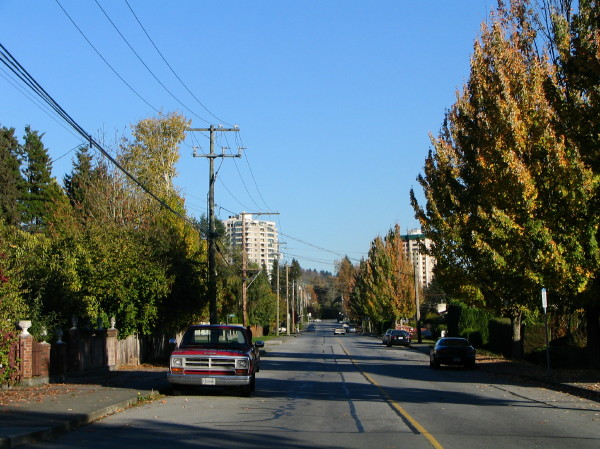
Halifax Street looking east towards Montecito

Montecito, for administrative and planning purposes also known as "Sperling-Broadway", is a neighbourhood in Burnaby, British Columbia, Canada.

Montecito is located to the southwest of Burnaby Mountain, between Kensington Avenue to the west and Greystone Drive and Arden Avenue to the east. Halifax Street and the Lougheed Highway form its northern and southern boundaries respectively. It used to be part of a larger Lochdale neighbourhood.

The area is served by several bus routes such as #134, #144 and #136. Sperling – Burnaby Lake Station is directly to the south.

There are two elementary schools in this area - Sperling and Montecito. Burnaby North Secondary School serves this and neighbouring areas.

Two major attractions are Burnaby Mountain Golf Course and the adjacent Squint Lake. There is a small Montecito Park with some tennis courts.

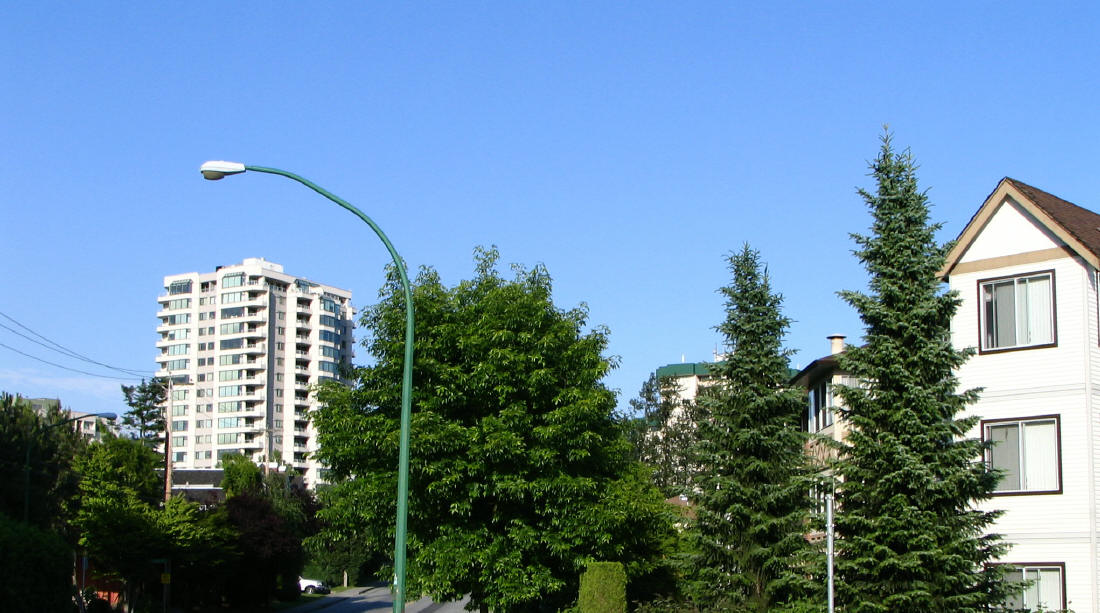
Duthie Ave at Halifax Street

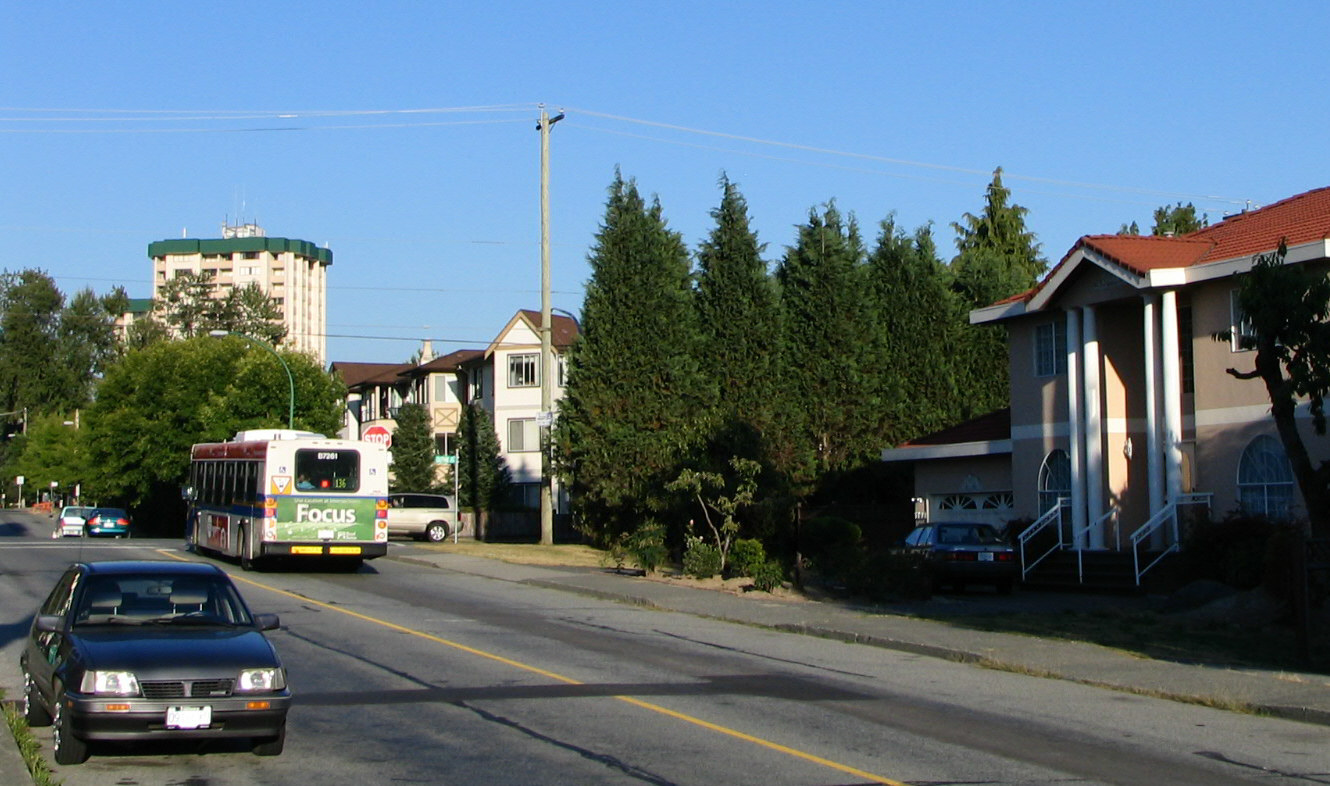
Halifax Street west of Duthie Ave

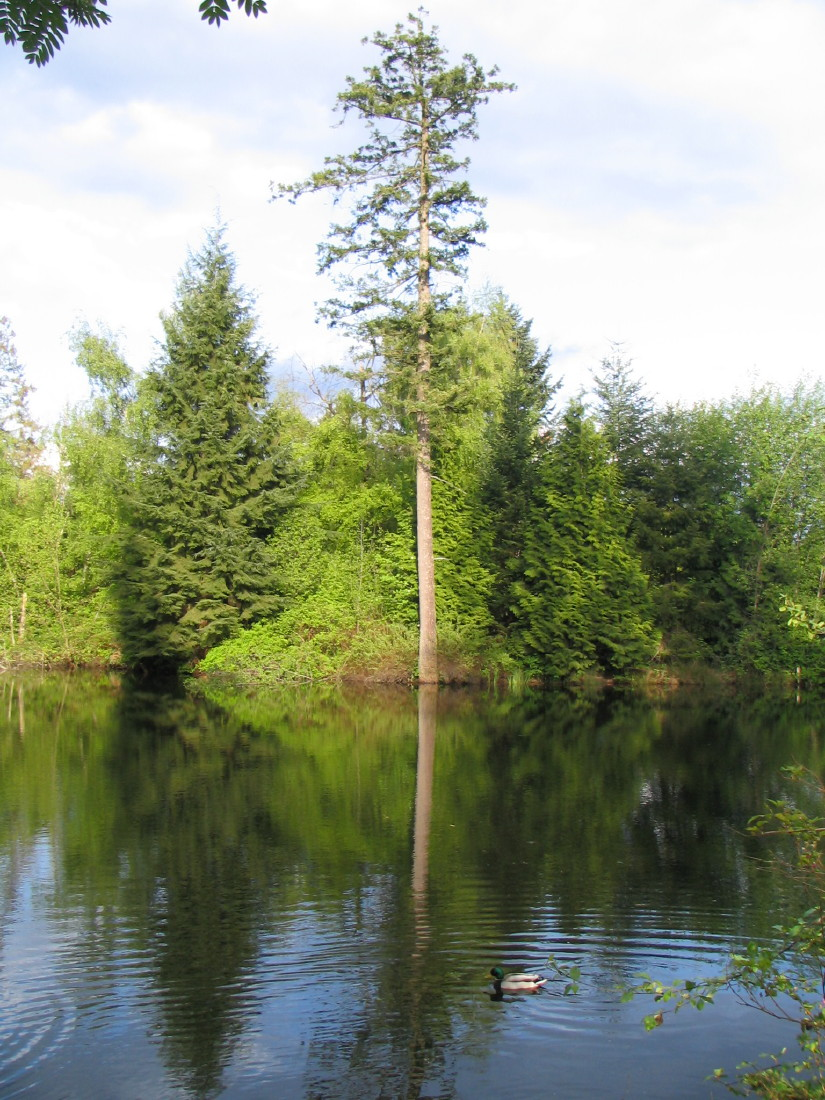
Squint Lake in spring

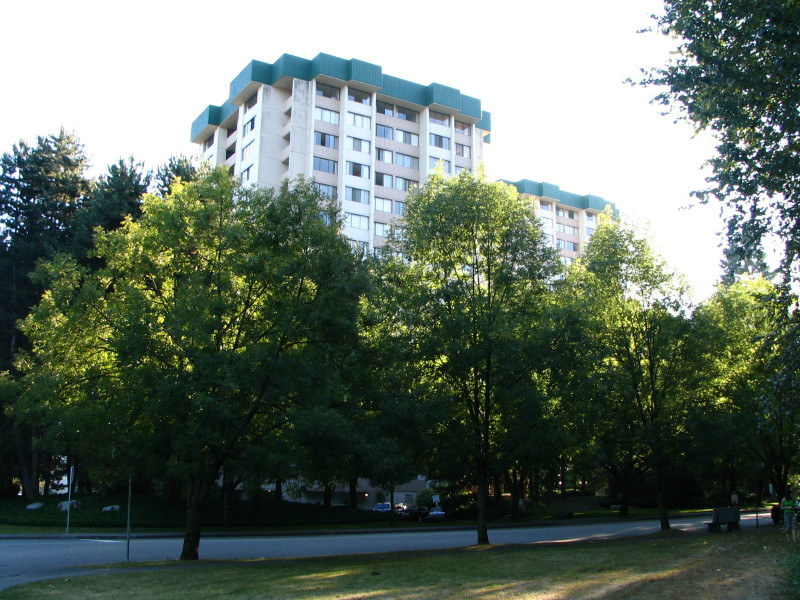
Halifax Street at Phillips Ave is the corner where several apartment and condo buildings are located
