= Sperling–Burnaby Lake station =

Metro Vancouver SkyTrain station

Sperling–Burnaby Lake
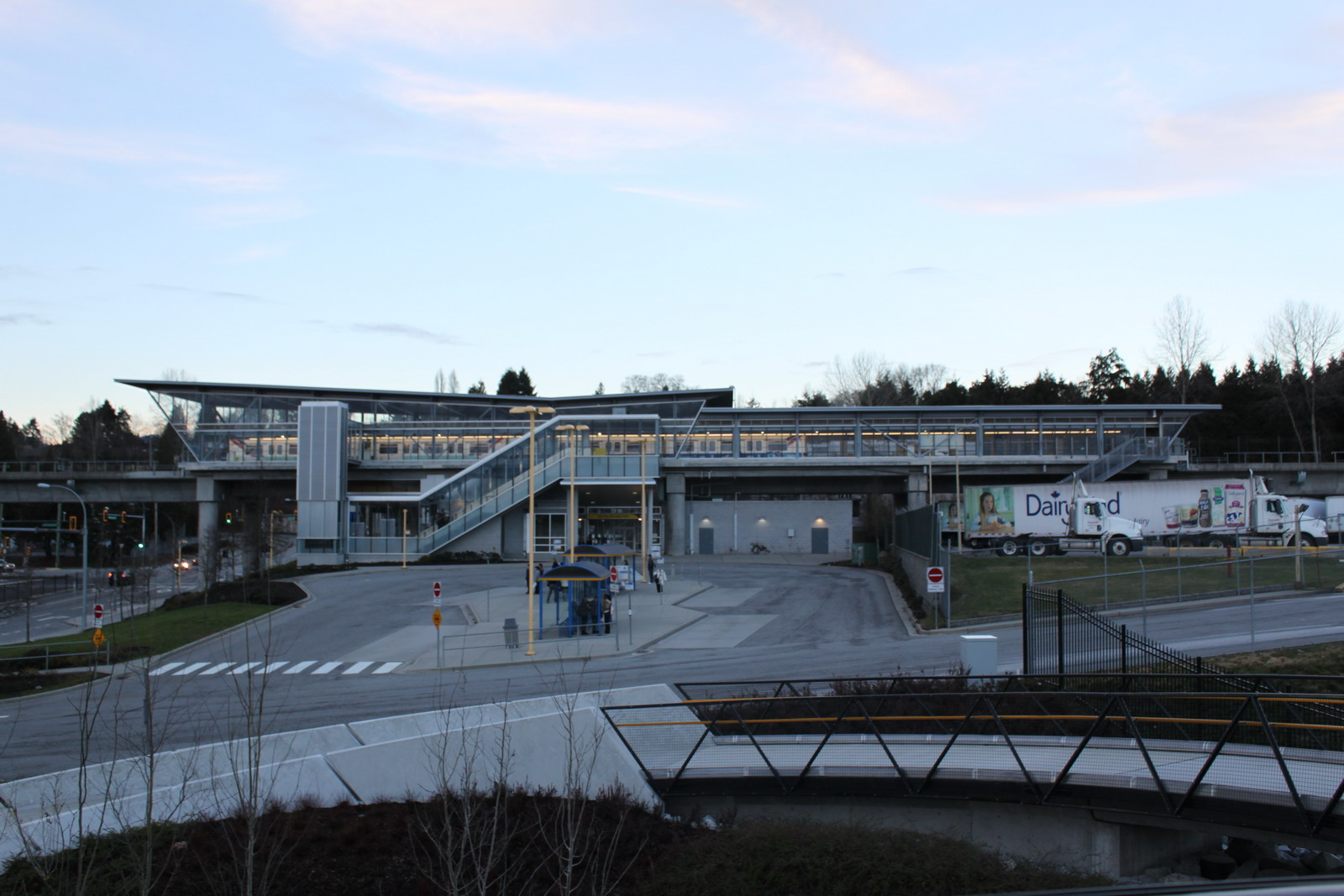
- North facing view of the station and bus exchange

General information
- Location: 2800 Sperling Avenue, Burnaby, British Columbia
- Coordinates: 49.25914°N 122.96391°W
- System: SkyTrain station
- Owner: TransLink
- Platforms: Side platforms
- Tracks: 2

Construction
- Structure type: Elevated
- Accessible: yes

Other information
- Station code: SP
- Fare zone: 2

History
- Opened: August 31, 2002

Passengers
- 2025: 574,000 ▼3.5%
- Rank: 52 of 54

Services
| Preceding station | TransLink | Following station |
|---|---|---|
| Holdom towards VCC–Clark | Millennium Line | Lake City Way towards Lafarge Lake–Douglas |
Location

Sperling–Burnaby Lake is an elevated station on the Millennium Line of Metro Vancouver's SkyTrain rapid transit system. The station is located on the southeast corner of the intersection at Sperling Avenue and Lougheed Highway in Burnaby, British Columbia, Canada. The Burnaby Lake Regional Park is located nearby, from which the name of the station is partially derived.

== Station information ==
=== Entrances ===
Stained glass window art created by artist Lutz Haufschild

Sperling–Burnaby Lake station is served by two entrances. The main north entrance faces Lougheed Highway while the south entrance connects to the station's bus loop.

=== Transit connections ===
Sperling–Burnaby Lake station provides connections within Burnaby and to Simon Fraser University. The following bus routes serve the station:

| Bay | Route number | Destination |
|---|---|---|
| 1 | | (Spare) |
| 2 | 144 | Metrotown Station |
| 2 | 144 | SFU |
| 3 | 110 | Metrotown Station |
| 3 | 110 | Lougheed Station |
| 4 | 134 | Brentwood Station |
| 4 | 134 | Lake City Station |
