= Lake City Way station =

Metro Vancouver SkyTrain station

Lake City Way
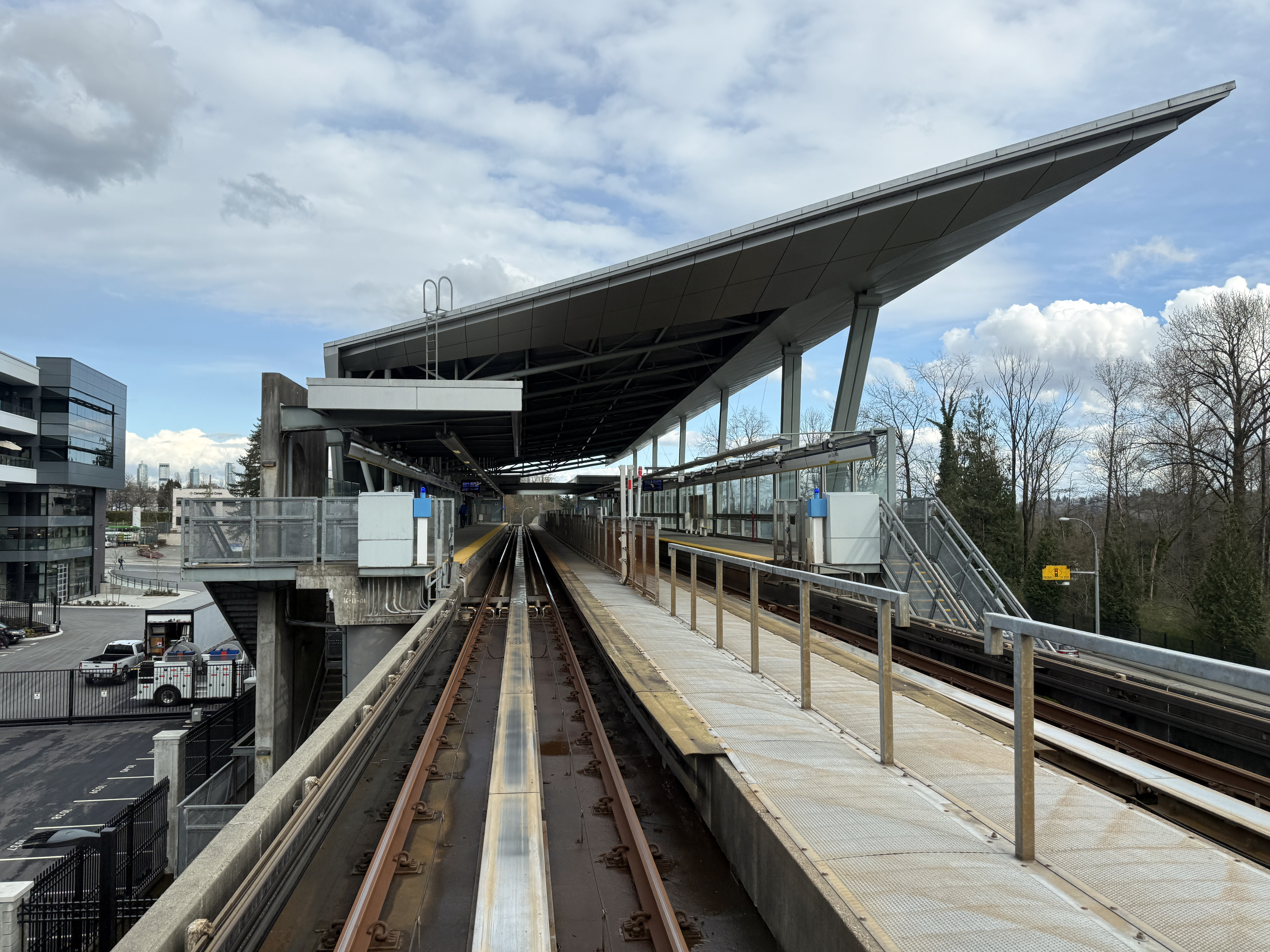
- Platform level at Lake City Way station

General information
- Location: 3191 Lake City Way, Burnaby
- Coordinates: 49.25458°N 122.93903°W
- System: SkyTrain station
- Owner: TransLink
- Platforms: Side platforms
- Tracks: 2

Construction
- Structure type: Elevated
- Accessible: yes
- Architect: Francl Architect; Stantec Architecture

Other information
- Station code: LC
- Fare zone: 2

History
- Opened: November 21, 2003

Passengers
- 2025: 261,000 ▼10.9%
- Rank: 54 of 54

Services
Preceding station	TransLink	Following station
Sperling–Burnaby Lake towards VCC–Clark	Millennium Line	Production Way–University towards Lafarge Lake–Douglas
Location

Lake City Way is an elevated station on the Millennium Line of Metro Vancouver's SkyTrain rapid transit system, located at the intersection of Lougheed Highway and Lake City Way in Burnaby, British Columbia, Canada. It opened in November 2003, after the initial 2002 opening of the Millennium Line. The station serves a nearby business park and the television studios for CHAN-DT (Global Television Network) and Global News: BC 1, a terrestrial and cable television news channel, respectively.

== History ==
Lake City Way station was opened on November 21, 2003, as an in-fill station, more than a year after the completion of the original portion of the Millennium Line. The station was not opened in 2002 along with the rest of the original Millennium Line stations as it was not part of the original plan for the line; however, the city of Burnaby made a push for the station. The architecture firms Francl Architect and Stantec Architecture were responsible for designing the station.

== Station information ==
=== Entrances ===
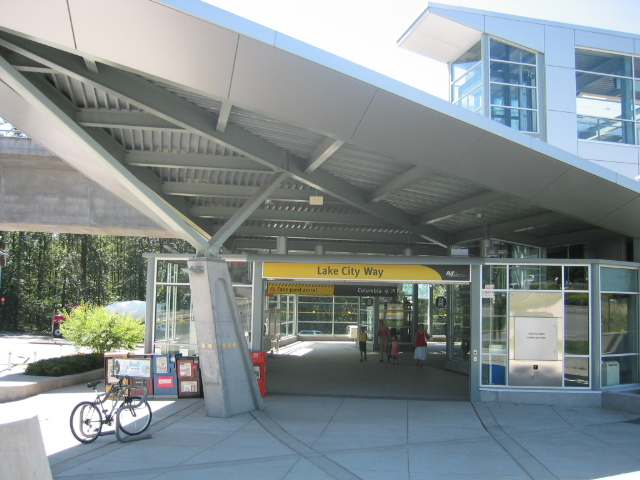
Station entrance

Lake City Way station is served by a single entrance located at the northeast corner of the station.

=== Transit connections ===
Lake City Way station provides connections within Burnaby, Vancouver and the Tri-City area. The following bus routes serve the station:

Stop number	Routes
53305	N9 Coquitlam Central Station NightBus
53308	N9 Downtown NightBus
58363	134 Brentwood Station
