= Holdom station =

Metro Vancouver SkyTrain station

Holdom
- Eastbound platform at Holdom station

General information
- Location: 2111 Holdom Avenue, Burnaby
- Coordinates: 49.26469°N 122.98222°W
- System: SkyTrain station
- Owner: TransLink
- Platforms: Side platforms
- Tracks: 2

Construction
- Structure type: Elevated
- Accessible: yes
- Architect: Hotson Bakker Architects

Other information
- Station code: HO
- Fare zone: 2

History
- Opened: August 31, 2002

Passengers
- 2025: 847,000 ▼1.6%
- Rank: 46 of 54

Services
Preceding station	TransLink	Following station
Brentwood Town Centre towards VCC–Clark	Millennium Line	Sperling–Burnaby Lake towards Lafarge Lake–Douglas
Location

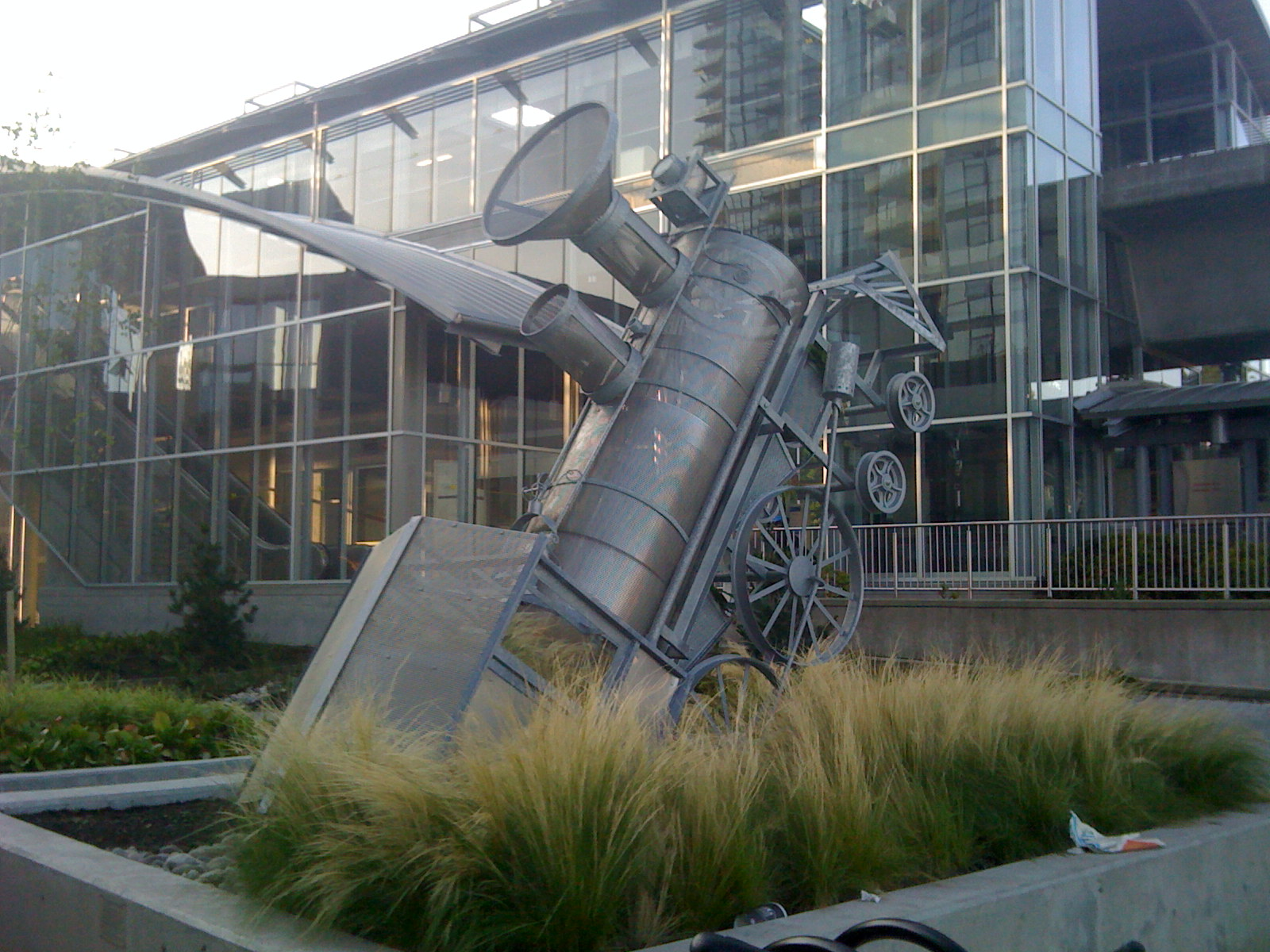
The Search Engine sculpture outside the station

Holdom is an elevated station on the Millennium Line of Metro Vancouver's SkyTrain rapid transit system. The station is located at the intersection of Lougheed Highway and Holdom Avenue in Burnaby, British Columbia, Canada. Located adjacent to the station is a residential development with two high-rise towers, low-rise units, and several commercial shops.

== History ==
Holdom station was opened in 2002 as part of the original Millennium Line project.

== Structure and design ==
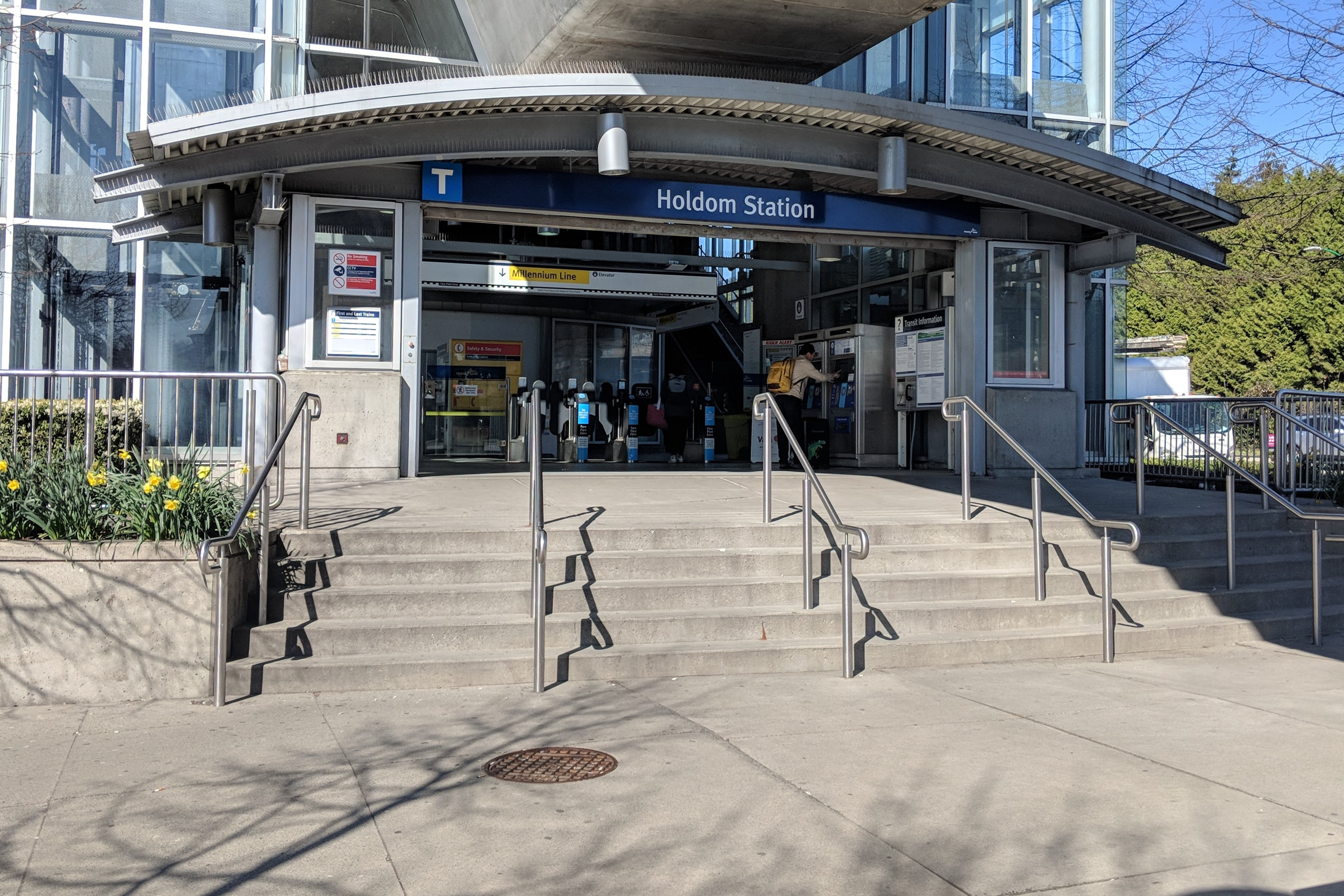
Holdom station entrance

Holdom station was designed by the architecture firm Hotson Bakker Architects, and its structure is topped with a sculpture, by glass artist Graham Scott, which includes square lanterns made of sandblasted mirror that is lit by stage-quality lighting. The colour of the lights are controlled by a computer, continually and randomly changing.

== Station information ==
=== Transit connections ===
Holdom station provides connections within Burnaby, Vancouver and the Tri-City area. The following bus routes serve the station:

Stop number	Routes
53302	N9 Coquitlam Central Station NightBus
53309	N9 Downtown NightBus
58342	129 Patterson Station; 136 Lougheed Station
58343	133 Edmonds Station; 136 Brentwood Station
