= Gilmore station (SkyTrain) =

Metro Vancouver SkyTrain station

Gilmore
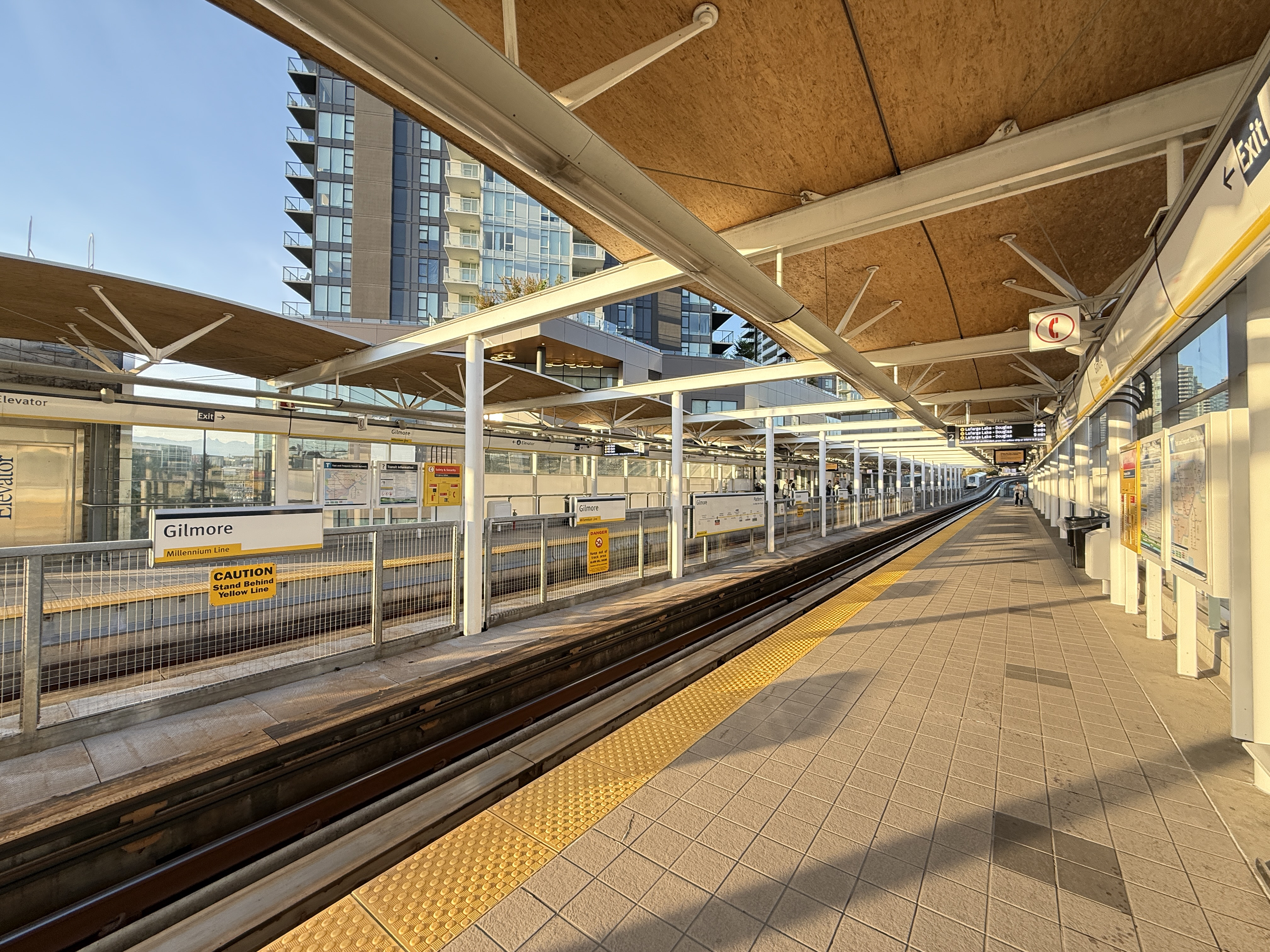

General information
- Location: 2199 Gilmore Avenue, Burnaby
- Coordinates: 49.26489°N 123.01351°W
- System: SkyTrain station
- Owner: TransLink
- Platforms: Side platforms
- Tracks: 2

Construction
- Structure type: Elevated
- Accessible: yes

Other information
- Station code: GM
- Fare zone: 2

History
- Opened: August 31, 2002

Passengers
- 2025: 1,143,000 ▲9.8%
- Rank: 43 of 54

Services
| Preceding station | TransLink | Following station |
|---|---|---|
| Rupert towards VCC–Clark | Millennium Line | Brentwood Town Centre towards Lafarge Lake–Douglas |
Location

Gilmore is an elevated station on the Millennium Line of Metro Vancouver's SkyTrain rapid transit system. The station is located on Gilmore Avenue in Burnaby, British Columbia, Canada.

The station is adjacent to several high-rise condominium complexes which are a component of the Brentwood Town Centre Development Plan, which drives the transformation of the area from a light industrial and lower-occupancy commercial zone into an urbanized centre.

== Structure and design ==
Gilmore station, completed in 2002 as part of the original Millennium Line, is elevated with two platforms on either side of the SkyTrain tracks. The station was designed by Busby and Associates who also designed Brentwood Town Centre station. Dominion Construction built the Gilmore station as part of a $14.3-million contract that also included Brentwood Town Centre station and the Gilmore power substation.

As the station was expected to be incorporated into a new commercial complex, the wood and metal frames were designed to be easily disassembled and then reconfigured, maintaining the artistic intention of the station and accommodating any future alterations to the SkyTrain line or development around it.

== Station information ==
=== Entrances ===
Gilmore station is served by a single entrance located at the southwest end of the station at the northeast corner of Gilmore Avenue and Dawson Street.

=== Transit connections ===
Gilmore station provides connections within Burnaby and the District of North Vancouver. The following bus routes serve the station:

| Bay | Stop number | Routes |
|---|---|---|
| 1 | 58344 | 28 Phibbs Exchange; 129 Holdom Station; N9 Coquitlam Central Station NightBus |
| 2 | 58346 | 129 Patterson Station |
| 3 | 58345 | 28 Joyce Station |
