= Brentwood Town Centre station =

Metro Vancouver SkyTrain station

Brentwood Town Centre
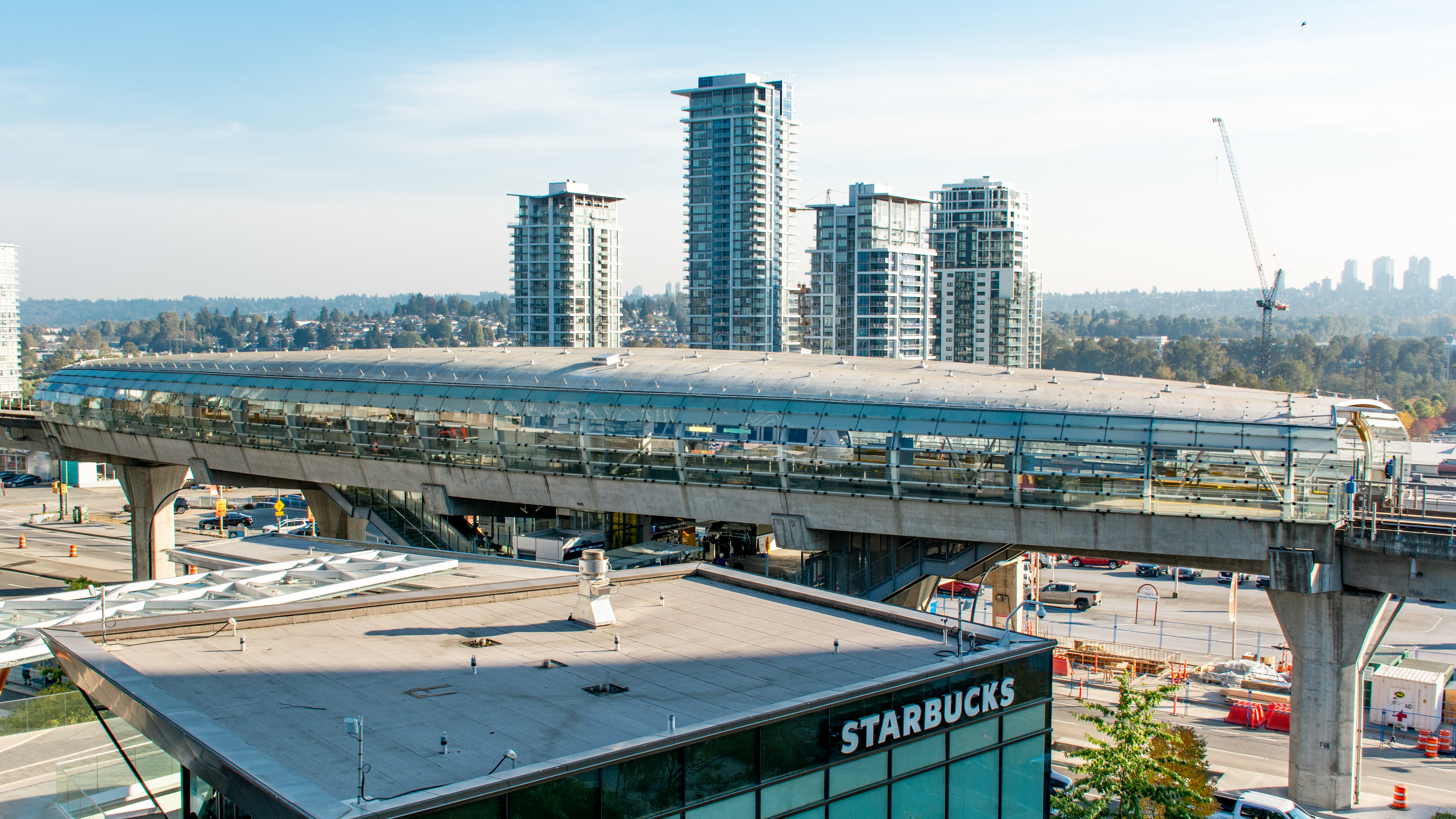
- Station building in 2022

General information
- Location: 4533 Lougheed Highway, Burnaby
- Coordinates: 49.26633°N 123.00163°W
- System: SkyTrain station
- Owner: TransLink
- Platforms: Side platforms
- Tracks: 2
- Connections: R2 Marine–Willingdon

Construction
- Structure type: Elevated
- Accessible: Yes
- Architect: Perkins and Will Canada

Other information
- Station code: BR
- Fare zone: 2

History
- Opened: August 31, 2002; 24 years ago
- Rebuilt: 2022–2025; 1 year ago

Passengers
- 2025: 2,346,000 ▲2.7%
- Rank: 24 of 54

Services
Preceding station	TransLink	Following station
Gilmore towards VCC–Clark	Millennium Line	Holdom towards Lafarge Lake–Douglas
Location

Brentwood Town Centre (sometimes abbreviated as Brentwood) is an elevated station on the Millennium Line of Metro Vancouver's SkyTrain rapid transit system. The station is located above Lougheed Highway east of Willingdon Avenue in Burnaby, British Columbia, Canada. The station is adjacent to the Amazing Brentwood, a mid-size shopping centre.

== Structure and design ==
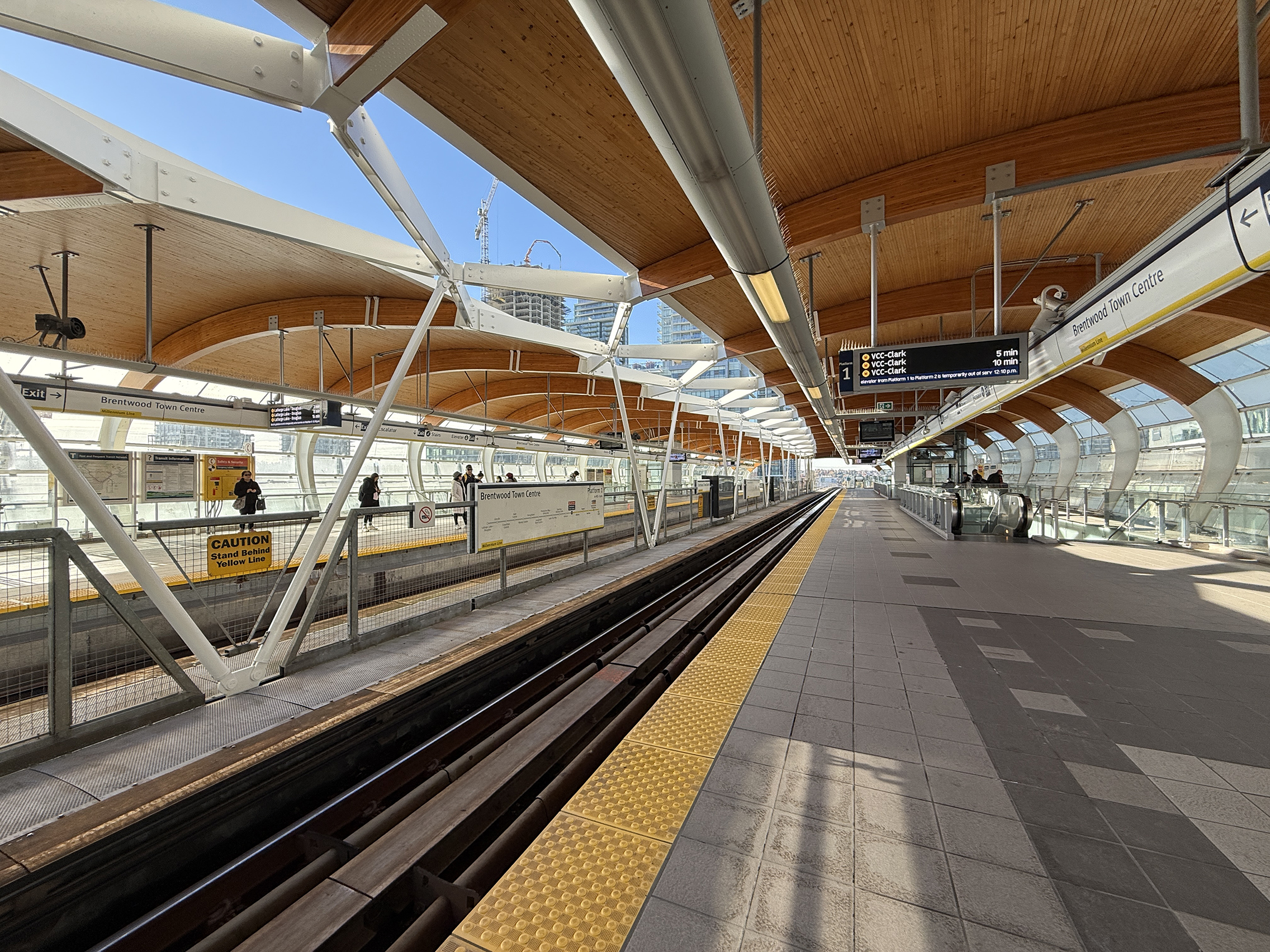
Brentwood Town Centre station platform in 2025

Brentwood Town Centre station is the only station in the system that is built on a median, with the entire station footprint located directly above a roadway. The station is also designed to serve as a pedestrian overpass across Lougheed Highway, which required the station platforms to be high above the roadway and a publicly accessible mezzanine/concourse to be built below the platform level. Only two other Millennium Line stations have this feature, Gilmore and Lougheed Town Centre stations.

The station is built using a combination of wood and steel, custom-designed to provide a curved appearance. The extensive use of glass for the outer wall makes the station glow at night.

On May 11, 2002, Perkins and Will Canada, designers of the station, were honoured for their work with a Governor General's Medal in Architecture.

In 2020, a $33-million program was announced, which featured the rebuilding of the station's south entrance to improve accessibility and increase capacity in response to population growth in the area. The staircases were to be enclosed in glass and supplemented by a new elevator. Construction began on June 20, 2022, and the rebuilt south entrance with the new elevator opened on January 8, 2024, followed by two new escalators opening on March 24, 2025.

== Station information ==
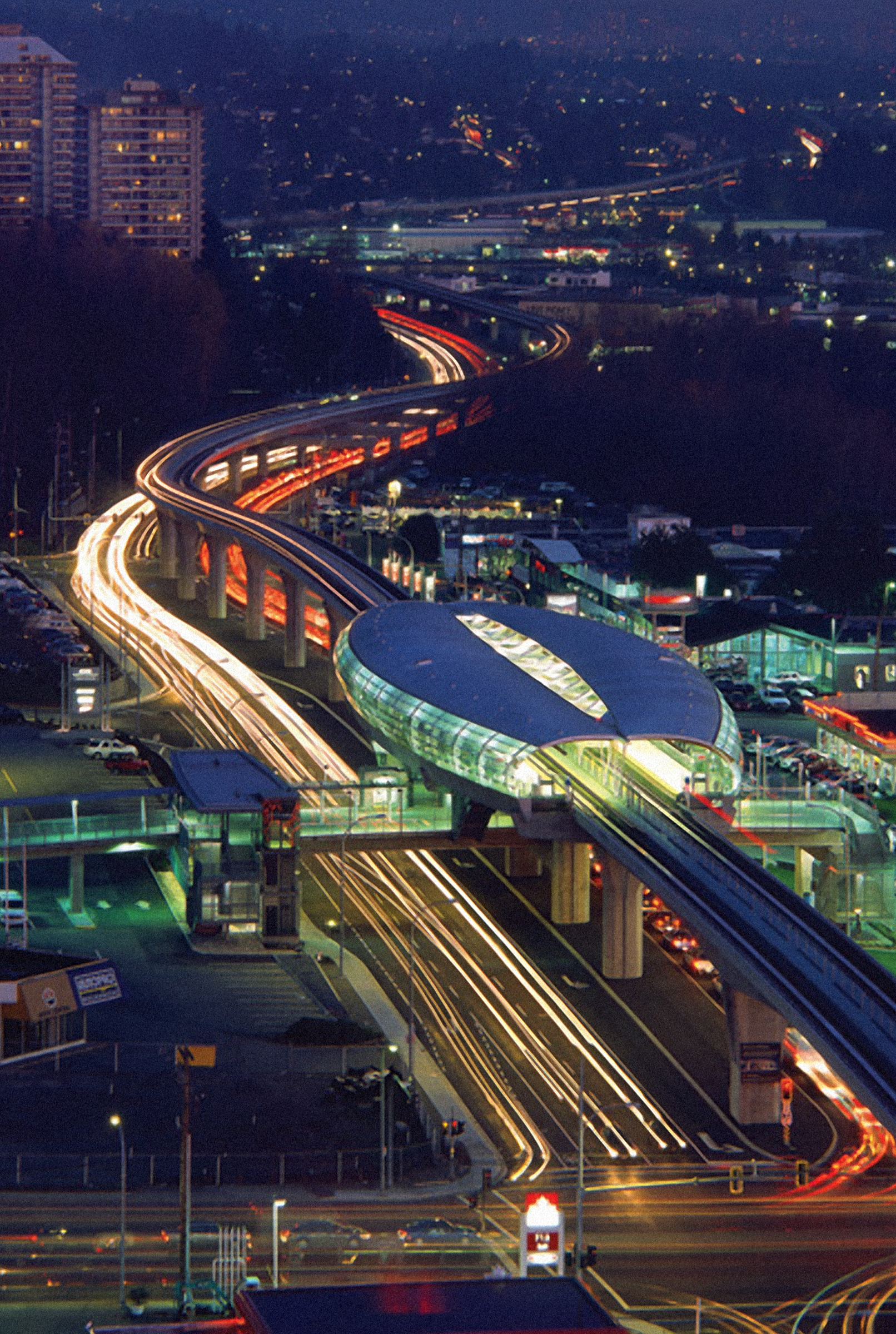
The station at night photographed in 2011, before construction started on The Amazing Brentwood redevelopment

=== Entrances ===
North entrance: A set of stairs and an elevator connecting the station concourse with the sidewalk on the north side of Lougheed Highway. A bus stop located directly in front of the entrance provides a drop-off for SkyTrain connections without the need to go to the bus loop.

North Entrance Mall/Bus Loop Access: Connects to the Amazing Brentwood shopping centre, bus loop, and the station with a long ramp and walkway. The walkway connects to the station at the north end of the concourse level, and it is completely covered and weather-protected.

South entrance: A set of stairs and an elevator connecting the station concourse with the sidewalk on the south side of Lougheed Highway. This entrance provides an alternate connection to various bus routes that serve the station.

=== Transit connections ===
Brentwood Town Centre station is a major regional connection point for bus routes serving north Burnaby, Metrotown, North Vancouver and New Westminster. It is also has a connection to the British Columbia Institute of Technology (BCIT).

As of September 2026, the following routes serve Brentwood Town Centre station:

Bay	Location	Routes
1	Willingdon Avenue; Northbound	R2 Marine–Willingdon to Park Royal RapidBus; 130 Kootenay Loop / Phibbs Exchange
2	Lougheed Highway; Westbound	134 Lake City Station; N9 Downtown NightBus
3	Lougheed Highway; Eastbound	136 Lougheed Station
4	Lougheed Highway; Eastbound	Unloading only
5	Lougheed Highway; Eastbound	25 UBC; N9 Coquitlam Station NightBus
6	Willingdon Avenue; Southbound	130 Metrotown Station
7	Willingdon Avenue; Southbound	R2 Marine–Willingdon to Metrotown station; 123 New Westminster Station; 130 Metrotown Station
8	Willingdon Avenue; Northbound	Layover only
