= Burnaby Lake Regional Park =

Regional park in British Columbia, Canada

Burnaby Lake
- Aerial view of Burnaby Lake in 2026
- Interactive map of Burnaby Lake
- Type: Regional Park
- Location: Burnaby, British Columbia
- Coordinates: 49.2425°N 122.9475°W
- Area: 3.11 km^{2} (770 acres)
- Operator: Metro Vancouver Regional District
- Website: metrovancouver.org/services/regional-parks/park/burnaby-lake-regional-park

Burnaby Lake is a lake located in Burnaby, British Columbia and is the focal geographic feature and namesake of Burnaby Lake Regional Park. The lake occupies 3.11 square kilometres (770 acres) of land, and is home to a large variety of wildlife. At least 70 species of birds make the lake and surrounding areas their home, and about 214 species of birds visit the lake throughout the year. The park has been managed by the Metro Vancouver Parks Department since 1977.

== History ==
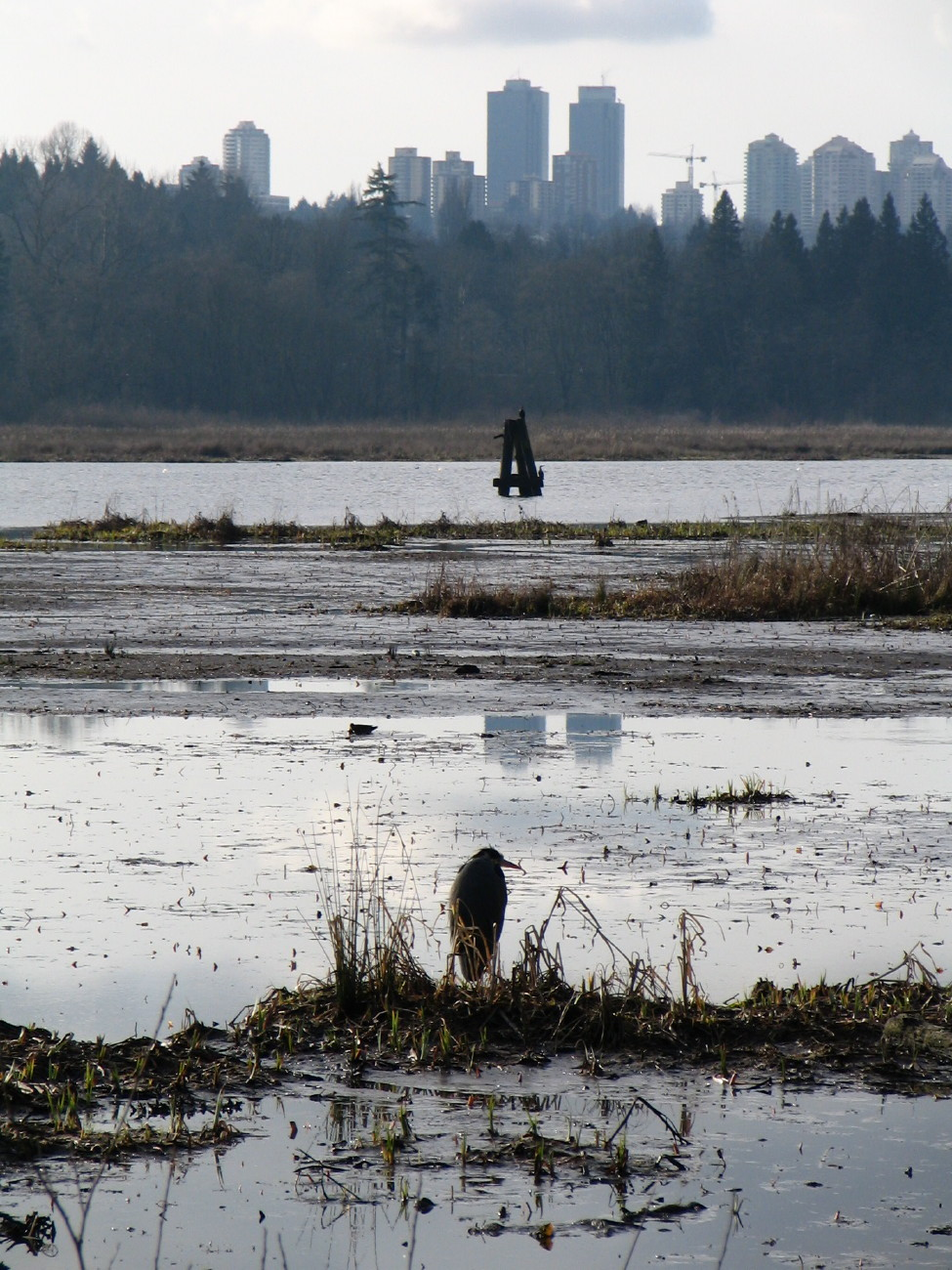
Burnaby Lake on a cloudy day. Metrotown in the distance

Burnaby Lake is a glacial lake that formed about 12,000 years ago, at the end of the Pleistocene ice age.

The lake was named by Colonel Richard Moody after his private secretary, Robert Burnaby. According to a map and materials by Heritage Advisory Committee and Environment and Waste Management Committee of the City of Burnaby (1993), in March 1859 Colonel Moody began to survey the site of New Westminster as the capital city for the new Colony of British Columbia. He was particularly intrigued with the possibility that a fresh water lake existed north of the town. In a letter to Governor James Douglas, Moody wrote: "I now learn from the Indians that a lake does exist... Burnaby and Blake immediately volunteered their services to explore and also to trace the mouth to Burrard's Inlet and to report generally on the countryside north of the town. After a considerable reluctance on account of the weather I have let them go with four days' provisions in light marching order, not even tents, two Indians, a Canadian Voyageur attached to Parson's survey party and my own trusty Corporal Brown R.E. They have been away now three days in the most deplorable weather. The rain was in torrents all last night and it is streaming down still in tropical torrents - nothing would gladden my eyes more than to see them back." Robert Burnaby and the rest of the party did return safely and the official hydrographic chart produced in 1860 featured two discoveries: Burnaby Lake and the Brunette River.

A number of sawmills were situated here in the late 19th century.

== Geography ==
The lake is situated to the east of Burnaby City Hall, and is bordered by Highway 1 to the south, and the CN New Westminster Sub to the north (Formerly BN track). The Burnaby Lake Line of the British Columbia Electric Railway's interurban service from New Westminster to Vancouver ran along the south side of the lake.

Still Creek, Eagle Creek, and Deer Lake flow into Burnaby Lake, while the lake empties from the east to the Fraser River through the Brunette River.

== Ecology ==
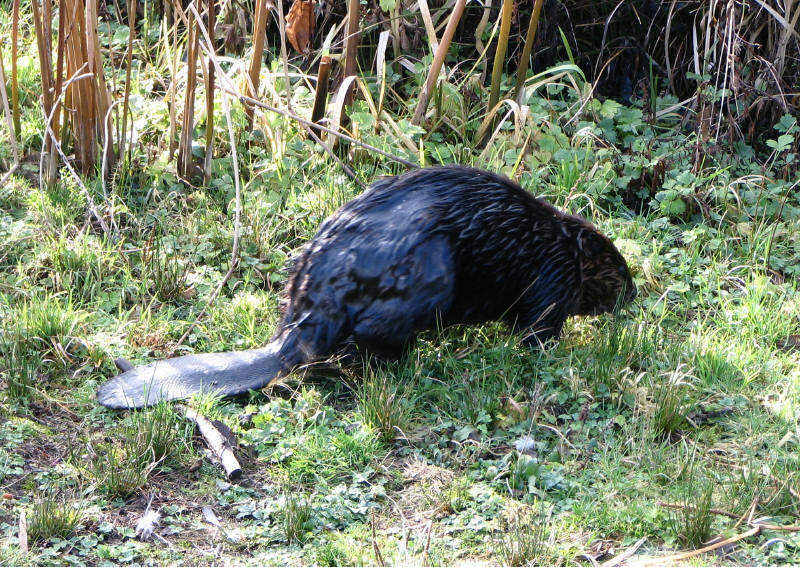
An old Burnaby Lake beaver with a limp

Mallard duck nesting in the park.

Burnaby Lake hosts over 400 plant, bird, fish, mammal, reptile and amphibian species. An exceptionally wide variety of birds frequent the area, including great blue herons, bald eagles, osprey, and the green heron. Black bears once were common in the area. Vegetation such as bladderworts, cattails, bulrushes, and sedges are common around the area, with deciduous trees around the edge of the marshes. Conifers occupy the areas furthest from the lake.

The lake is said to act as a settling pond for incoming pollutants from Still Creek, thereby protecting the outflowing Brunette River. Large amounts of sediment, peat moss, decomposing plants, and water lilies make the lake unsuitable for swimming.

Because many storm sewers drain to the lake and the Brunette River, the Cariboo Dam at Brunette River controls the rate of water outflow to prevent flooding downstream during times of heavy rain.

== Activities ==
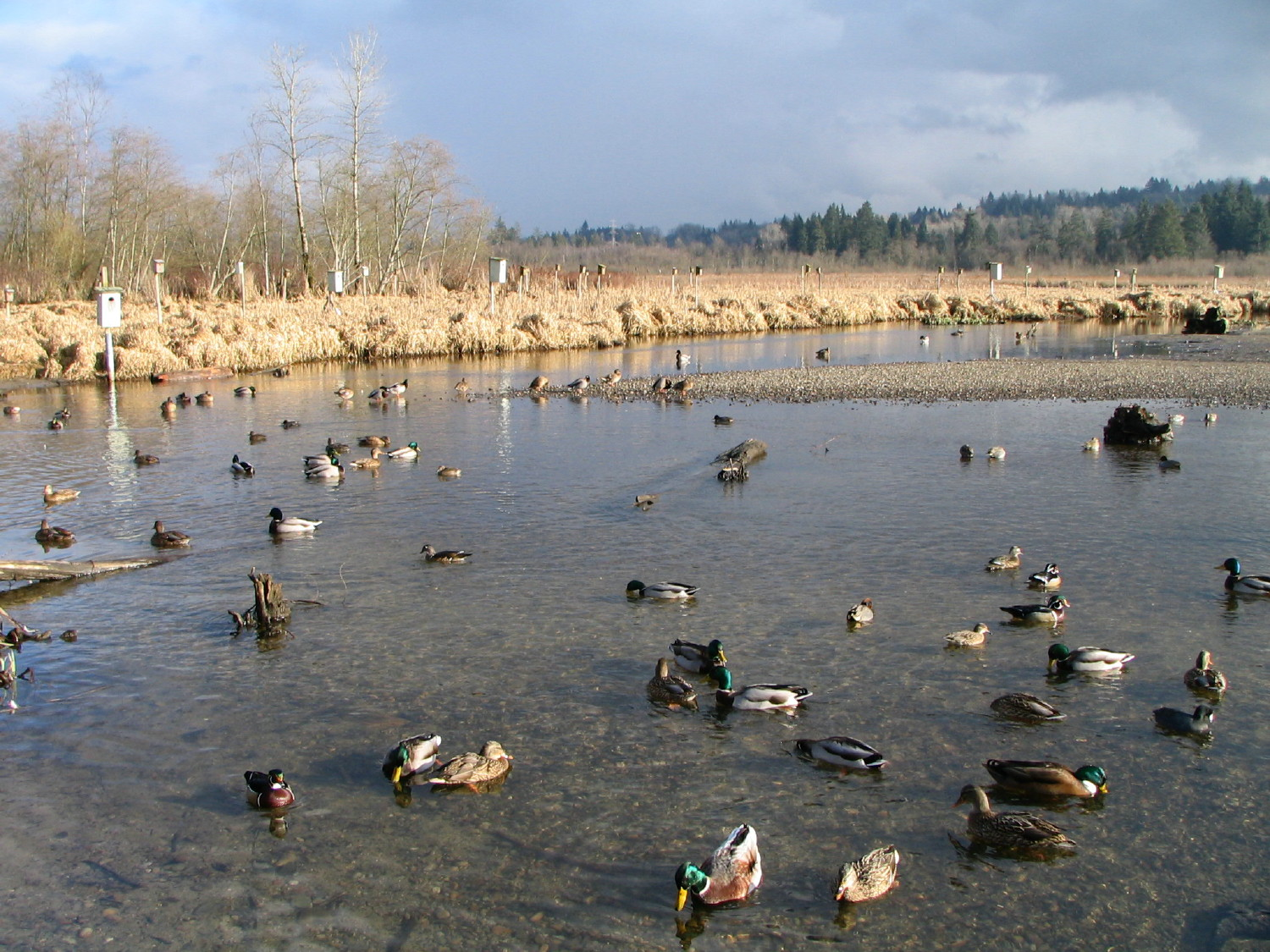
Burnaby Lake at Piper Spit pier

Birdwatching and hiking are common, with 19 km of walking and hiking trails circling the entire lake. The Burnaby Equestrian Centre is located here, with 6 km of horseback riding trails along the southern and eastern sides of the lake. Canoeing, rowing, and kayaking is also popular, with the Burnaby Canoe and Kayak Club and the Burnaby Lake Rowing Club in the Burnaby Lake Pavilion at the west end of the lake.

=== Other attractions ===
- Burnaby Lake Nature House
- Butterfly garden
- Piper Spit pier
- Burnaby Sports Complex
- Wildlife Rescue Association

The park is open from 8am to 9pm between the start of Daylight Saving Time (second Sunday of March) to Labour Day, and 8am to dusk for the rest of the year.

== Dredging ==
Over the past decades, sediment has been filling up the lake, reducing the average lake depth. By 2005, the lake was no longer suitable for competitive paddling sports, normal ecological balance has been disrupted, and parts of it are in danger of being reduced to mudflats and wetlands. Subsequently, the city removed 360,000 m^{3} (13,000,000 ft^{3}) of sediment, as part of the "Burnaby Lake Rejuvenation Project", in August 2006.
