= Reitsma =

Reitsma is a West Frisian surname. It may be patronymic ( "son of Reitse") or refer to an origin in the village of Reitsum, Friesland. People with this name include:

- Alexander Jan Reitsma (1919–1982), Dutch economist
- Chris Reitsma (born 1977), American baseball pitcher
- Doreen Patterson Reitsma (1927–2000), Canadian woman of the Royal Canadian Navy
- Paul Reitsma (born 1948), Canadian (British Columbian) politician

== See also ==
- Harold Reitsema (born 1948), American astronomer
- 13327 Reitsema, a main-belt asteroid named after Harold Reitsema
- Rintje Ritsma (born 1970), Dutch speed skater, four-fold allround champion
