= Dugald Campbell Patterson =

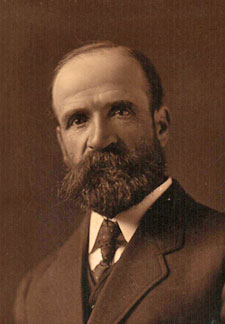
Patterson, c. 1912

Dugald Campbell Patterson Sr., (January 2, 1860 – June 25, 1931) is recognized in Vancouver, Burnaby, and New Westminster, British Columbia as a significant pioneer. He arrived in Canada on July 1, 1884 and engaged in the building trade while living in Victoria. In 1894 he moved to Burnaby where he acquired a five-acre parcel of land which today forms the north east section of Central Park. Patterson worked as an engineer for Armstrong Morrison & Balfour and later became foreman boilermaker for the Vancouver Engineering Works. He founded Vulcan Iron Works of New Westminster in 1903, was the first postmaster of the Edmonds district in 1909 and was a member of the New Westminster Board of Trade in 1911. He was elected a Burnaby school trustee in 1912, was a director of the British Columbia Electric and Water Heat Company and owned and operated a real estate business where he purchased and developed properties as far away as Barkerville. He also founded and operated an insurance company for many years. Patterson Avenue, which he originally cleared as a trail, and Patterson station, where he built the original interurban stop along the British Columbia Electric Railway, are named for the family.

Patterson was born in Partick, Lanarkshire, Scotland on January 2, 1860. He was one of three sons born to John Murdoch Paterson of Rutherglen, and Margaret (Purdon) Paterson of Partick. He attended the Glasgow common school, and worked as a ship joiner at Barclay Curle & Company (founded in 1818) in Whiteinch, Scotland. He was later employed in the Anchor Line Shipyards (founded in 1856) in Partick. After his arrival in Canada, he added a second "t" to the spelling of his last name which changed it from "Paterson" to "Patterson". On February 7, 1891 in Victoria, British Columbia, he married Frances Mabel Webb, a granddaughter of Thomas Webb, founder of Thomas Webb & Sons makers of fine English glass. Together, Dugald and Frances Patterson raised seven children.

In 1915, during World War I, Patterson accepted a commission by the British government to travel overseas to supervise a group of Canadians in the construction of submarines for the Royal Navy on the River Clyde near Glasgow, Scotland. It was here that he sustained an injury which left him in a wheelchair for the rest of his life. Upon his return home, he remained active in both municipal affairs and the arts. He developed a plan that would preserve ravines as parks in Burnaby, and he published a book of poetry prior to his death in Vancouver in 1931. The family home, known today as Dugald and Frances Patterson House, has been a heritage landmark in Burnaby since 1994, and is listed on the "Canada's Historic Places" website. Other notable Patterson family members include William Harold Patterson, a son who was a First World War veteran and captain in the Canadian Army, and Doreen Patterson Reitsma, a Canadian naval pioneer who was a granddaughter of Dugald Campbell Patterson.
