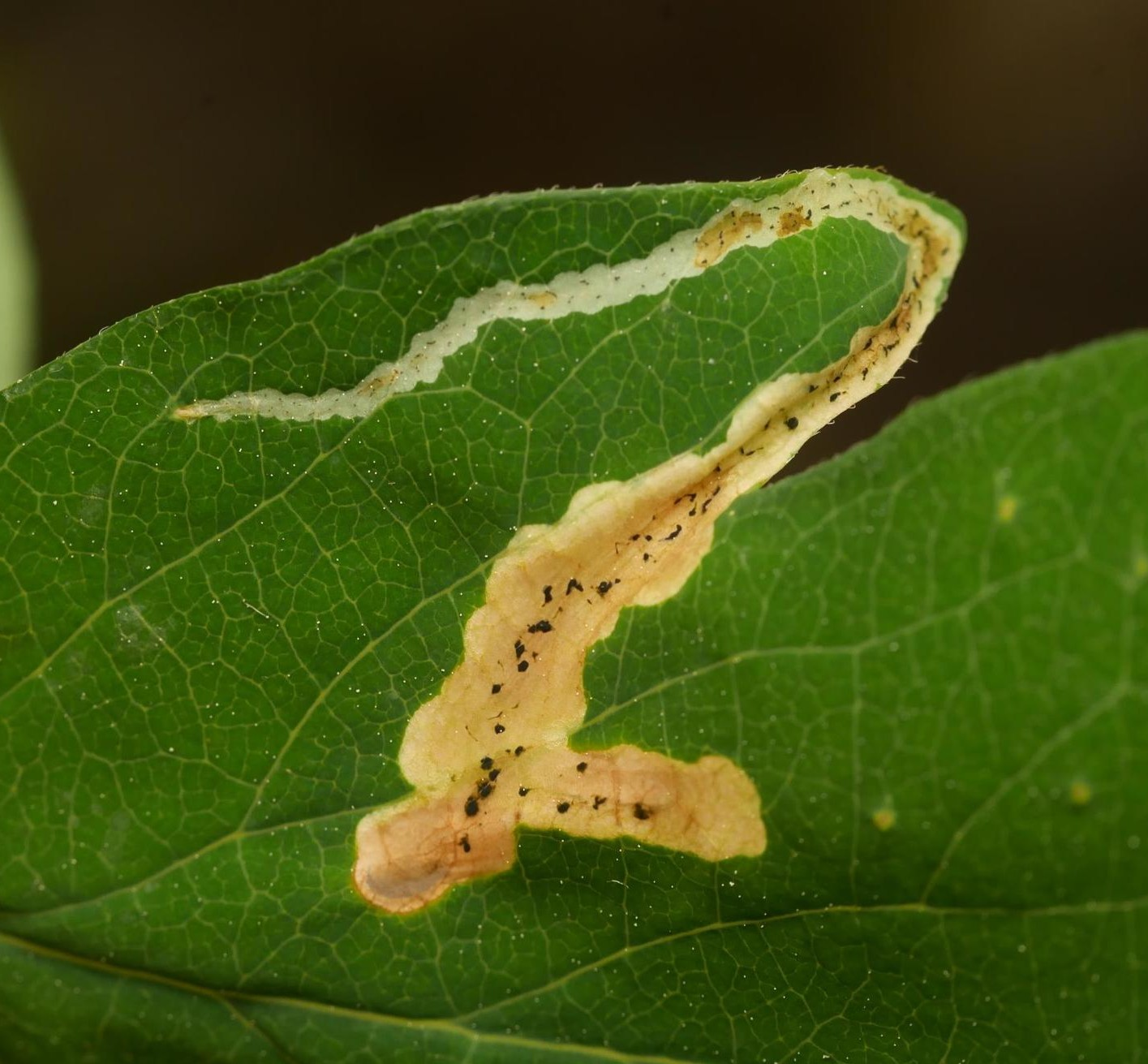
- Leaf mine on Symphoricarpos albus

Scientific classification
- Kingdom: Animalia
- Phylum: Arthropoda
- Class: Insecta
- Order: Diptera
- Family: Agromyzidae
- Genus: Aulagromyza
- Species: A. cornigera

Binomial name
- Aulagromyza cornigera (Griffiths, 1973)

Synonyms
- Paraphytomyza cornigera Griffiths, 1973

= Aulagromyza cornigera =

Species of leaf-mining fly

Aulagromyza cornigera is a species of leaf-mining fly in the family Agromyzidae. The larvae of this fly mine the leaves of plant species of the Lonicera (honeysuckle) and Symphoricarpos genera within the honeysuckle family. Mines potentially from this species have also been found on Triosteum perfoliatum.

== Description ==
Larvae of this species form white or greenish-white linear mines with black alternating lumps of frass on the upper surface of leaves. The species is univoltine, with larvae found as early as late March and as late as early June.

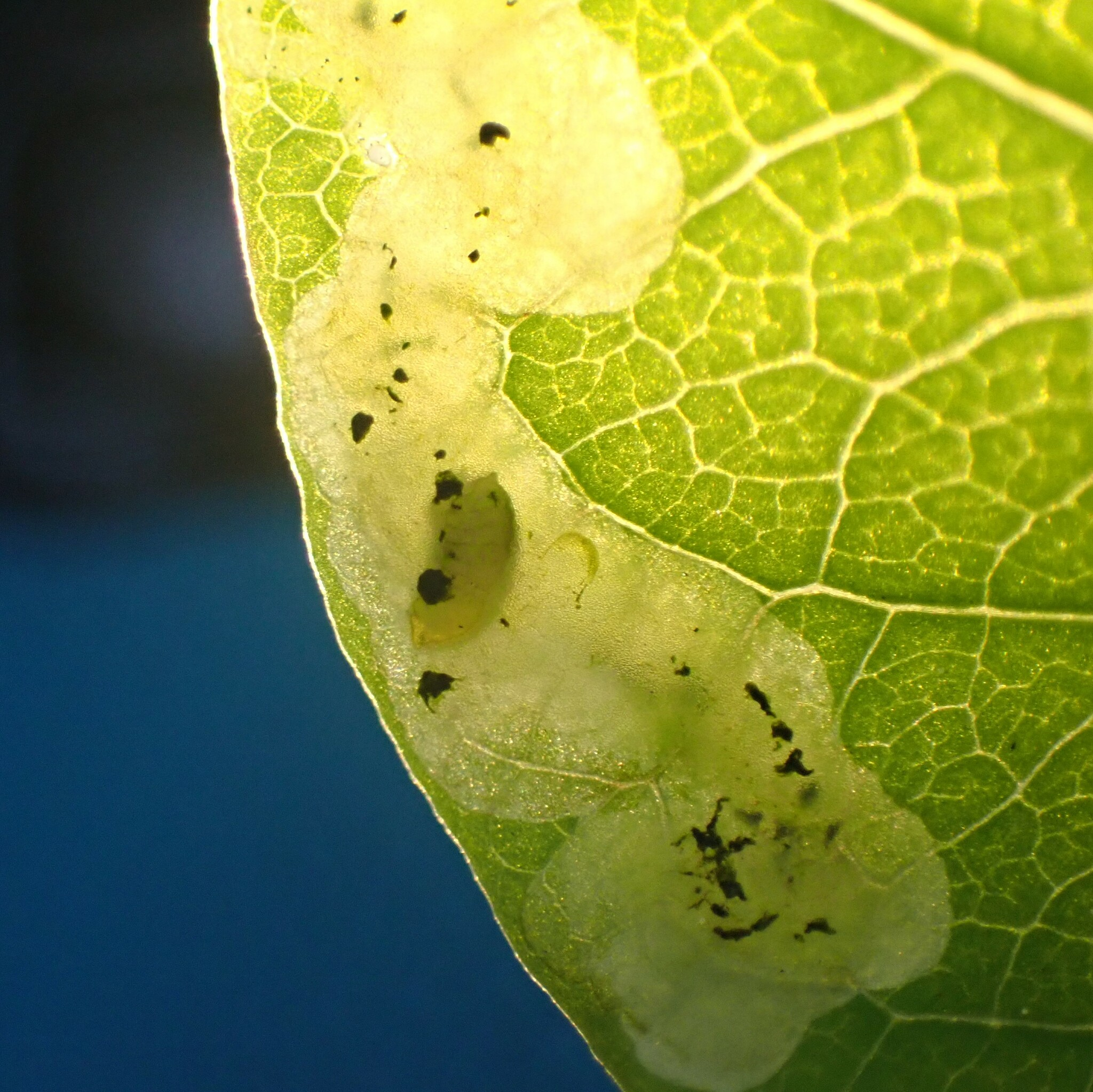
Aulagromyza cornigera larva within a mine on Lonicera ciliosa

== Distribution ==
The species is native to Europe, being found as far north as Norway and as far east as the Volga District of Russia. It is also found in the United States and southern Canada.
