= Central Park (Burnaby) =

Urban park in Burnaby, British Columbia

Coordinates: 49.227071°N 123.018208°W

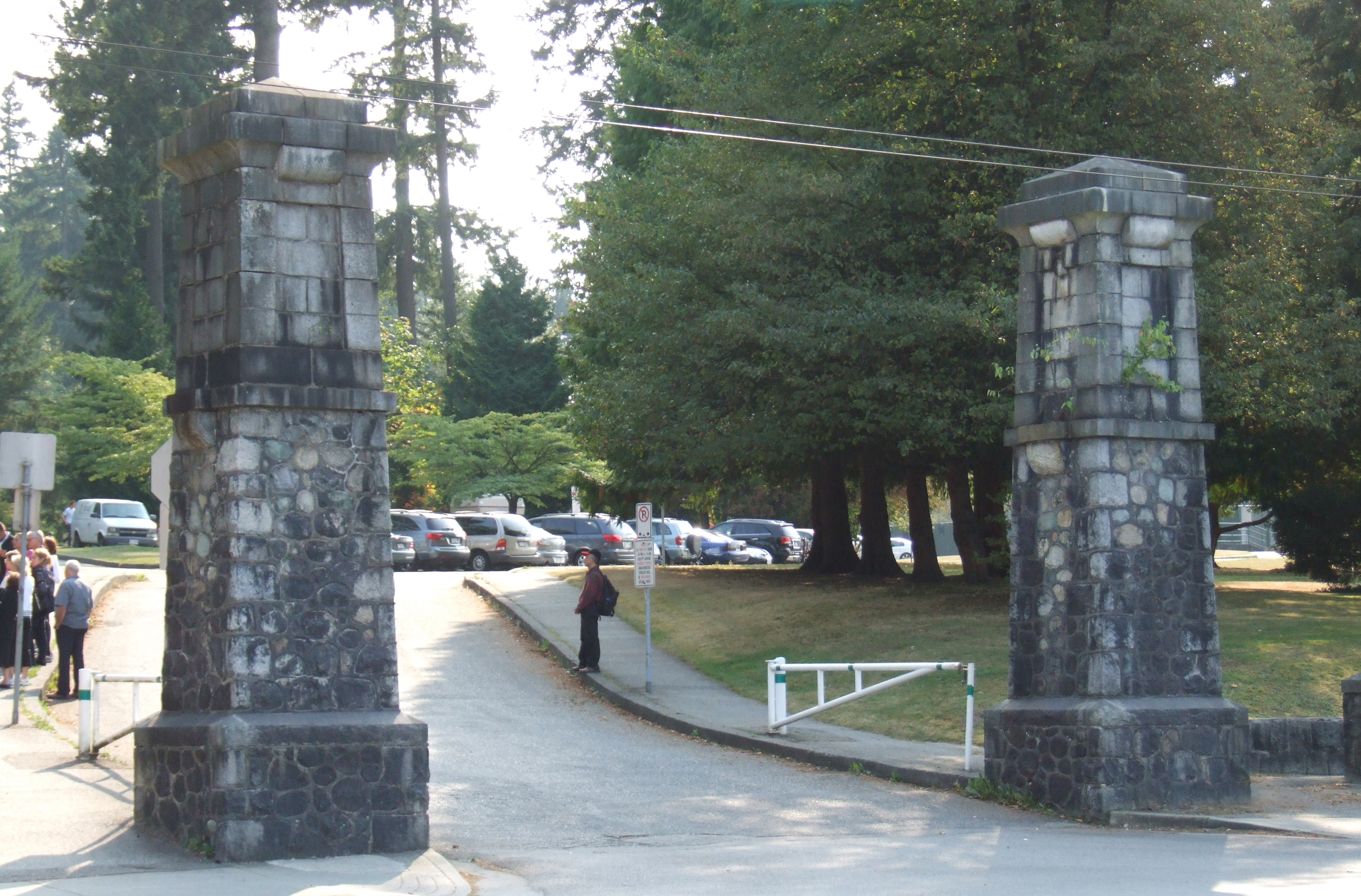
- Central Park Gate 3

- Location within Greater Vancouver Regional District
- Location: 3883 Imperial Street, Burnaby, British Columbia, Canada
- Nearest city: Vancouver
- Area: 86.4 hectares (213 acres)
- Established: 1891
- Owner: Burnaby
- Website: Official website

Metrotown and Central Park from Renfrew-Collingwood

Central Park is a 90-hectare (220-acre) urban park in Burnaby, British Columbia, founded in 1891.

The park is on the Vancouver–Burnaby border, just west of the Metropolis at Metrotown shopping complex, and is bounded by Boundary Road on the west, Kingsway on the north, Patterson and Willingdon Avenues on the east, and Imperial Road on the south. The nearest SkyTrain station, Patterson station, named for Burnaby pioneer Dugald Campbell Patterson, is at the park's northeast corner. The main entrance to Central Park is off Kingsway near Patterson Avenue.

Central Park was once a naval reserve set aside as a source of masts and spars for ships of the Royal Navy. The park was named to honour Mrs. Sarah (Christine) Oppenheimer, the wife of Vancouver's second mayor, who was born in New York City.

Central Park's primary attraction is the large proportion of its land reserved as a well-preserved temperate rainforest ecosystem, with numerous walking trails. Among its other attractions are the award-winning children's playground, pitch and putt golf, an outdoor swimming facility, a lawn bowling facility, several picnic areas, tennis courts, and a couple of small duck ponds. Wildlife in the park includes grey squirrels and coyotes.

A fitness circuit was installed during the time period between 2012 and 2014 in the park replacing the old wooden exercise apparatus to metal and rubber ones. These apparatus are situated throughout the park and include an exercise bike, pull-up bars, and weights. The 12 stations are designed to improve strength, cardiovascular health, balance, and flexibility. A total of 13,998 pounds (6,349 kg) of rubber was used in the manufacturing of the apparatus. The creation of the circuit was sponsored by Tire Stewardship BC and Kal Tire.

The Korean War Memorial is in the west side of the park, close to Boundary Road. Swangard Stadium, the former home for the Vancouver Whitecaps soccer team, is located at the northwest corner of Central Park.

== Attractions ==
Variety Park Playground in Central Park

=== Trails and hiking ===
The 5-kilometre (3.1 mi) Terry Fox Trail circles around the upper pond and just reaches the lower pond. Visitors often use this trail for physical activity purposes and it is annually used for the Terry Fox Run for the City of Burnaby. The 2.6-kilometre (1.6 mi) Trail of Hope also circles around the upper pond and reaches the lower pond while a 1.9 kilometer trail circles a portion of the parkland.

=== Swangard stadium ===
Swangard Stadium, former home of the Vancouver Whitecaps, and erected in 1961, is located at the north-west corner of the park. It regularly holds soccer and rugby games, alternative sporting events, concerts, and a variety of community events. The stadium is available for rental.

=== Facilities ===
There is an outdoor pool on the west side of the park, slated to be converted for indoor use in 2023. The fitness circuit, tennis courts, and golf course are located on the southeast side, while the baseball diamond, lawn bowling facility, and horseshoe pitch sit on the northeast side. The Earl and Jennie Lohn Perennial Garden, as well as the Variety Park playground, are also located on the northeast side of the park.

== Ecology ==
Pitch & Putt in the Central Park

Central Park's large wooded areas are temperate rainforest, a remnant of Vancouver's original forest ecosystem. The park was logged in the 1890s, and huge stumps can still be seen. Notches in these stumps mark them as harvested by springboard logging techniques. Seedlings can be seen growing from these stumps. As these stumps decay they provide habitat and nutrients for the young plants, while protecting them from the acidic conditions on the forest floor.

The park has two man-made lakes and a stream, which are home to many phytoplankton and zooplankton species, including Daphnia and Cyclops species.

=== Animal life ===
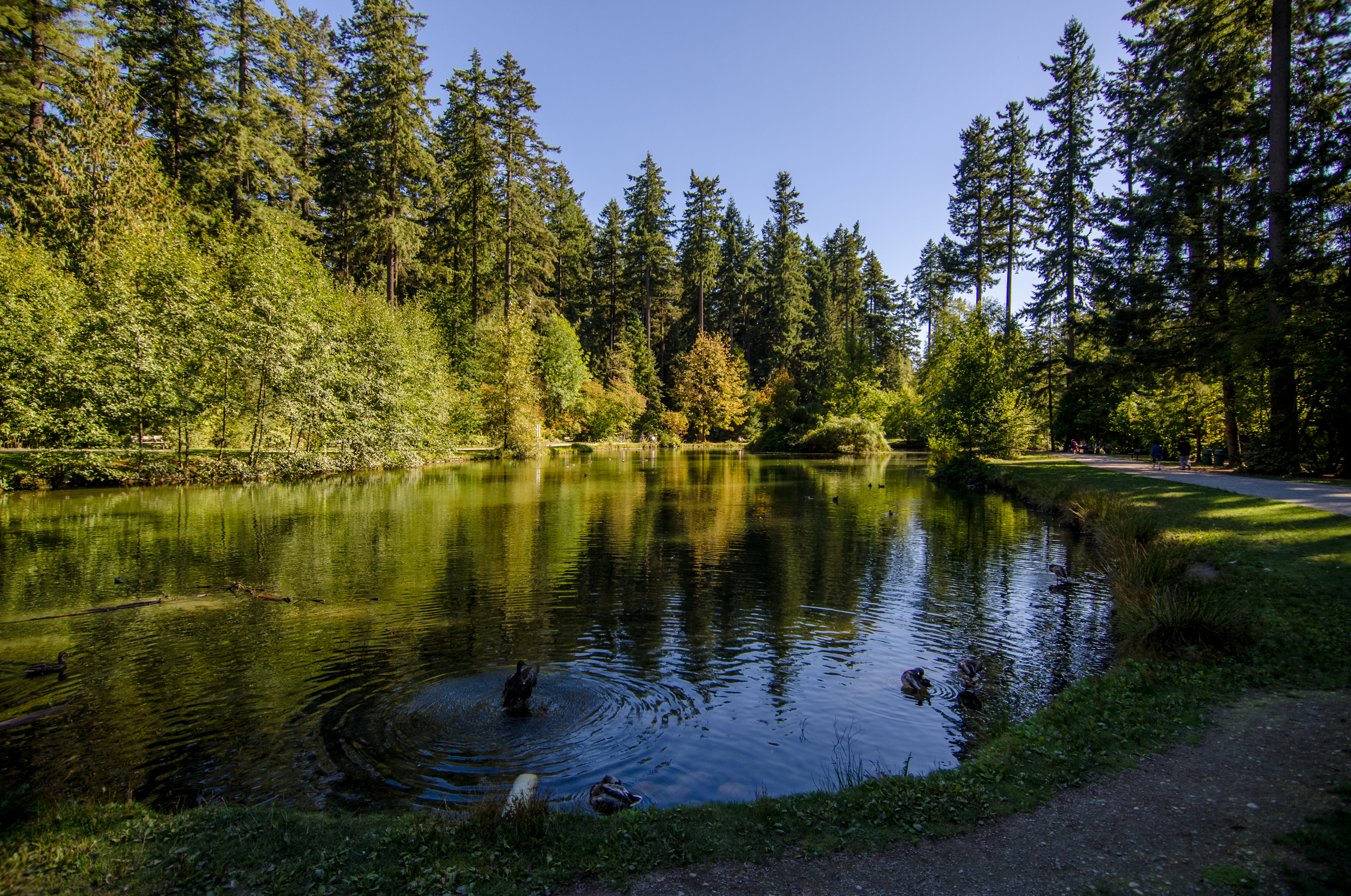
Ducks swimming in the Central Park Pond

A variety of birds live in the park, attracted by the habitat and berry-producing shrubs. These include downy woodpeckers, towhees, American robins, sparrows, finches and crows. The park is home to Douglas squirrels and northern coyotes.

Both lakes provide habitat for Canada geese, mallards, and other waterfowl. The upper lake is home to crawfish and minnows. The lower lake has schools of brown bullhead, a fish in the catfish order, which can sometimes be viewed from the bridge by the golf shop.

==== Invasive animal species ====
Some common invasive animals include Eastern gray squirrel, American bull frog, European chafer beetle and European fire ants.

In early 2012 a blotched snakehead was seen in YouTube videos of Central Park's lagoon. Because of the invasive and aggressive nature of the snakehead, scientists were called in, the lagoon was drained, and the fish was captured. There is no evidence it reproduced or spread its range, and so the snakehead had not spread to British Columbia.

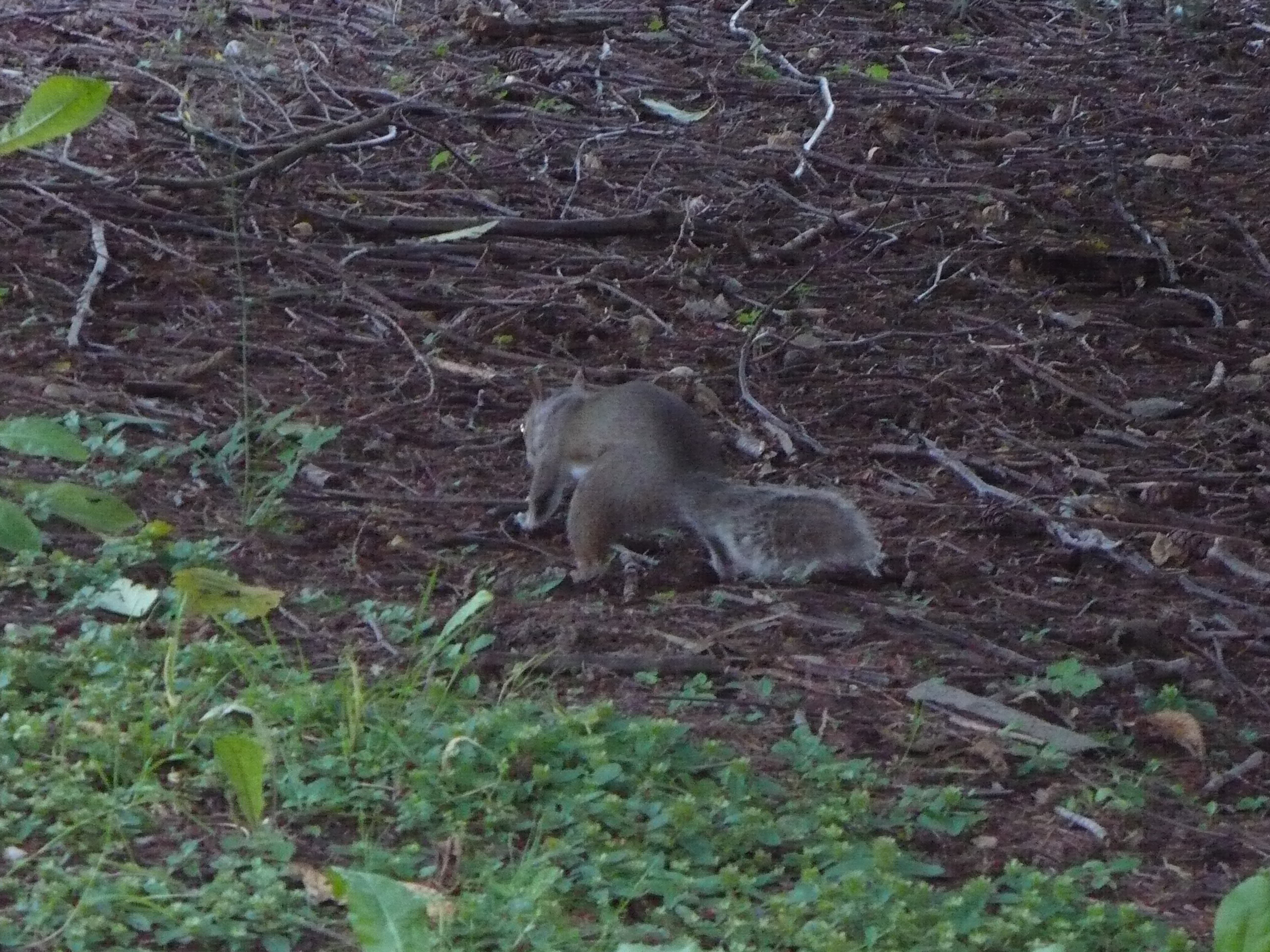
An invasive Eastern gray squirrel in Burnaby's Central Park.

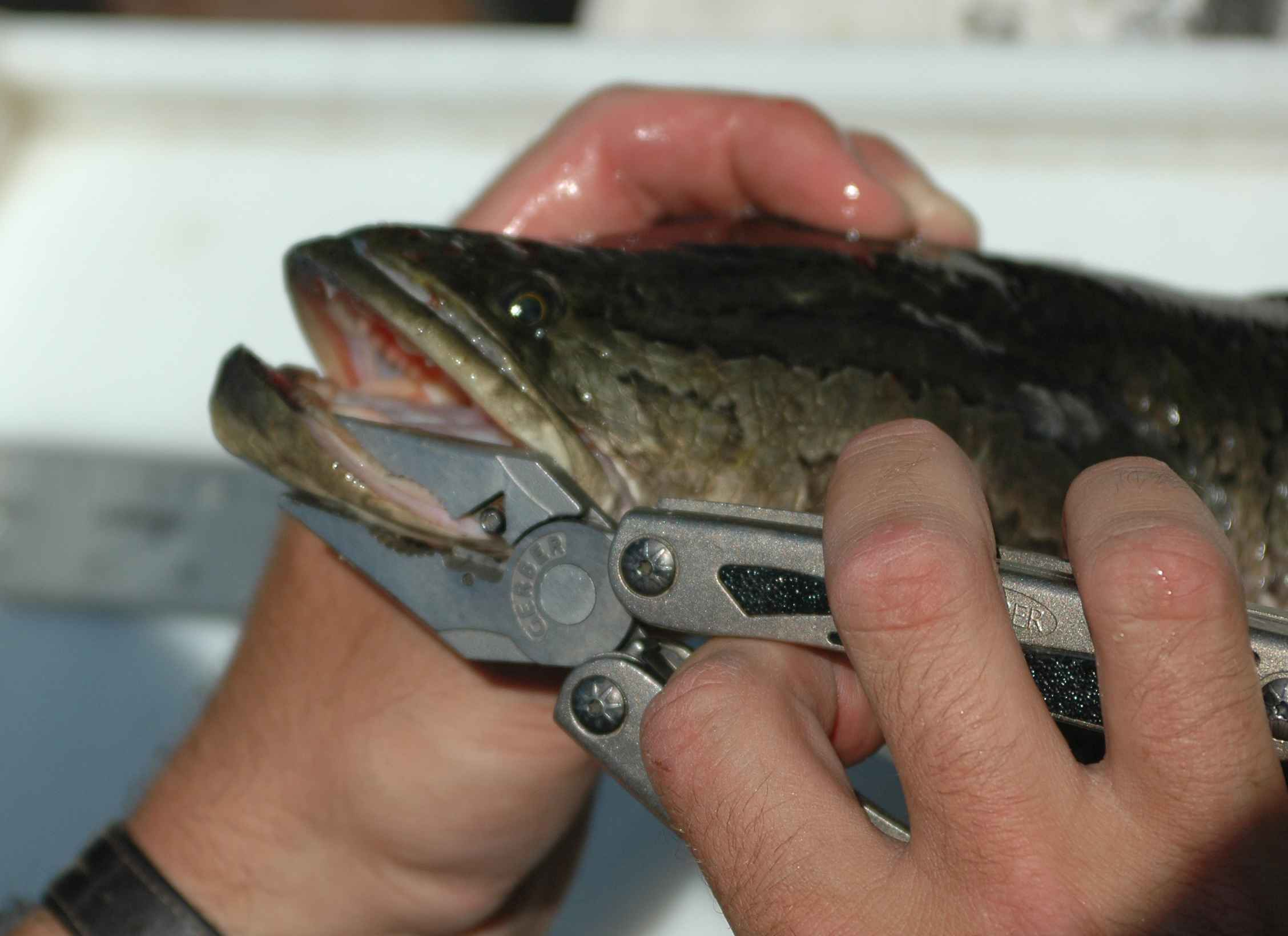
An invasive snakehead fish

=== Plant life ===
This second growth forest is dominated by Douglas fir, western hemlock, and western red cedar. Vine maple, spruce, birch and elderberry are present, and each have a significant share of the tree overstory. Salmonberry, thimbleberry, huckleberry and trailing blackberry provide edible fruit for humans and animals, and together with hollyhock make up the shrub understory. Sword and bracken ferns are also abundant. The native vine orange honeysuckle can be found growing up tree trunks near Swangard Stadium.

==== Invasive plant species ====
Burnaby Central Park has a few invasive plant species that the city is working to remove. These plans were implemented in 2011 along the 2.5 kilometer trail as known as Trail of Hope and is primarily run by volunteers even to this day. Some of these invasive plant species that populate Central Park are English holly, English ivy, Butterfly-bush, Japanese knotweed, Policeman's helmet, and Periwinkle.

Community organizations are part of an ongoing effort to reduce and eliminate invasive plant species. The Invasive Species Council of British Columbia has non-profit status, and spreads public awareness in addition to dealing with invasive plants directly.

== See also ==
- Death of Marrisa Shen
