= Patterson station (SkyTrain) =

Metro Vancouver SkyTrain station

Patterson
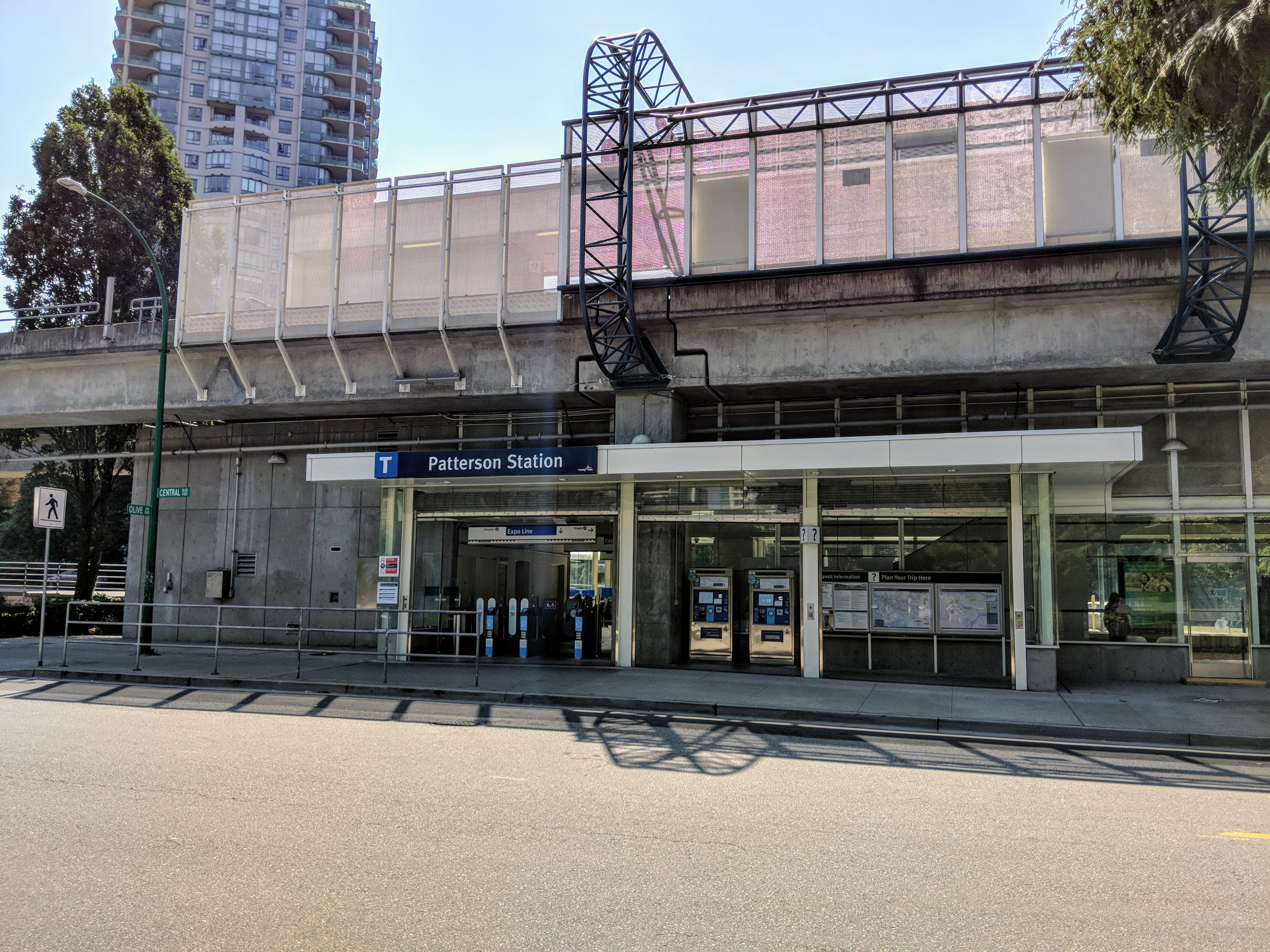

General information
- Location: 4101 Beresford Street, Burnaby
- Coordinates: 49.22967°N 123.012376°W
- System: SkyTrain station
- Owner: TransLink
- Platforms: Centre platform
- Tracks: 2

Construction
- Structure type: Elevated
- Accessible: yes

Other information
- Station code: PT
- Fare zone: 2

History
- Opened: December 11, 1985; 40 years ago

Passengers
- 2025: 1,419,000 ▲0.9%
- Rank: 34 of 54

Services
Preceding station	TransLink	Following station
Joyce–Collingwood towards Waterfront	Expo Line	Metrotown towards King George or Production Way–University
Location

Patterson is an elevated station on the Expo Line of Metro Vancouver's SkyTrain rapid transit system. The station is located at the intersection of Central Boulevard and Patterson Avenue in Burnaby, British Columbia, Canada. It is the westernmost Expo Line station in Burnaby.

== Location ==
The station is located at the northeastern fringe of Burnaby's Central Park, at the corner of Patterson Avenue and Central Boulevard. A stretch of the Expo Line west of the station runs through the park. Due to its proximity to Central Park, a large wooded park with trails leading to Swangard Stadium, the station is primarily used by local residents in the area.

== History ==
Patterson station was built in 1985 as part of the original SkyTrain system (now known as the Expo Line). The station is named after pioneer Dugald Campbell Patterson, who built the original interurban stop in the 1890s, then known as Patterson's Landing.

This station is located above the old right-of-way of the former Central Park Line of the British Columbia Electric Railway. This line formerly ran just west of where Nanaimo station is today, and continued east to where the current New Westminster station is located.

On May 6, 1986, Princess Diana and Prince Charles disembarked at Patterson station after riding the SkyTrain from Waterfront station during their visit to Vancouver and Expo 86.

In 2002, Millennium Line service was introduced to the station, which provided outbound service to VCC–Clark station (originally Commercial–Broadway) via Columbia station in New Westminster. This service was discontinued and replaced with the Expo Line branch to Production Way–University station in 2016.

== Station information ==
=== Entrances ===
Patterson station is served by four entrances. The two main entrances are located at the southeast end of the station, one entrance faces Beresford Street and the stations bus loop, while the other entrance is adjacent to Central Boulevard. Two more entrances are located at the northwest end of the station, these two entrances are located within Central Park and do not allow access for the disabled.

=== Transit connections ===
Bus bay assignments are as follows:

Bay	Route number	Destination
1	129	Holdom Station
2		Unloading only
3	Spare	
