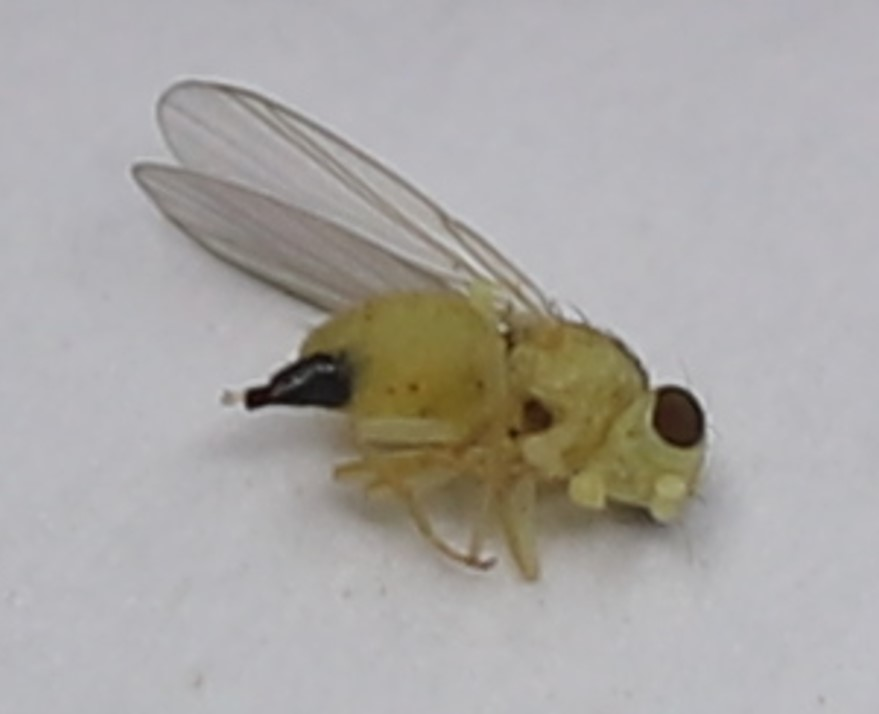
- Aulagromyza tridentata

Scientific classification
- Kingdom: Animalia
- Phylum: Arthropoda
- Clade: Pancrustacea
- Class: Insecta
- Order: Diptera
- Family: Agromyzidae
- Subfamily: Phytomyzinae
- Genus: Aulagromyza; Enderlein, 1936

Type species
- Aulagromyza hamata Hendel, 1932

Synonyms
- Rubiomyza Nowakowski, 1962

= Aulagromyza =

Genus of flies

Aulagromyza is a genus of flies in the family Agromyzidae.

== Species ==
- Aulagromyza albicipitoides (Hering, 1955)
- Aulagromyza anteposita (Strobl, 1898)
- Aulagromyza atlantidis (Spencer, 1967)
- Aulagromyza buhri (Meijere, 1938)
- Aulagromyza caraganae (Rohdendorf-Holmanova, 1959)
- Aulagromyza coloradensis (Spencer, 1986)
- Aulagromyza cornigera (Griffiths, 1973)
- Aulagromyza cydoniae (Hendel, 1936)
- Aulagromyza discrepans (Wulp, 1871)
- Aulagromyza fallax (Groschke, 1957)
- Aulagromyza flavoscutellata (Hendel, 1932)
- Aulagromyza fraxini (Beiger, 1980)
- Aulagromyza fraxinivora (Sasakawa, 1961)
- Aulagromyza fulvicornis (Hendel, 1935)
- Aulagromyza galii (Groschke, 1957)
- Aulagromyza gargi (Singh & Ipe, 1973)
- Aulagromyza hamata (Hendel, 1932)
- Aulagromyza hendeliana (Hering, 1926)
- Aulagromyza heringii (Hendel, 1920)
- Aulagromyza iberica (Spencer, 1960)
- Aulagromyza jaceicaulis (Hering, 1960)
- Aulagromyza jasmini (Spencer, 1987)
- Aulagromyza kozaneki Cerný, 2007
- Aulagromyza kraussi (Sasakawa, 1963)
- Aulagromyza lonicerae (Robineau-Desvoidy, 1851)
- Aulagromyza lonicerina (Spencer, 1981)
- Aulagromyza loniceroides (Spencer, 1987)
- Aulagromyza lucens (Meijere, 1924)
- Aulagromyza luteoscutellata (Meijere, 1924)
- Aulagromyza magna (Sasakawa, 1961)
- Aulagromyza mamonowi (Hering, 1930)
- Aulagromyza mesophalloides Sasakawa, 2013
- Aulagromyza metaplecicola (Sasakawa, 1961)
- Aulagromyza nigricauda (Sasakawa, 1961)
- Aulagromyza nitida (Malloch, 1913)
- Aulagromyza orbitalis (Melander, 1913)
- Aulagromyza orphana (Hendel, 1920)
- Aulagromyza paramushirensis Iwasaki, 2000
- Aulagromyza plagiata (Melander, 1913)
- Aulagromyza populi (Hendel, 1927)
- Aulagromyza populi (Kaltenbach, 1864)
- Aulagromyza populicola (Walker, 1853)
- Aulagromyza praecox (Spencer, 1981)
- Aulagromyza praescutellaris (Hendel, 1920)
- Aulagromyza similis (Brischke, 1881)
- Aulagromyza sisymbrii (Hering, 1962)
- Aulagromyza spenceri (Sehgal, 1971)
- Aulagromyza tarsata (Sasakawa, 1961)
- Aulagromyza tremulae (Hering, 1956)
- Aulagromyza tridentata (Loew, 1858)
- Aulagromyza tripolii (Meijere, 1924)
- Aulagromyza trivittata (Loew, 1873)
- Aulagromyza wuoerntausi (Hendel, 1936)
- Aulagromyza zernyi (Hendel, 1920)
