= Swangard Stadium =

Multi-purpose stadium in Burnaby, British Columbia

- Interactive map of Swangard Stadium
- Location: 6100 Boundary Road; Burnaby, British Columbia; Canada V5S 3R2
- Coordinates: 49°13′51″N 123°01′17″W
- Owner: City of Burnaby
- Capacity: 5,288
- Surface: Natural grass
- Field size: 115×75 yds (soccer); 150×65 yds (Canadian football)
- Public transit: Patterson

Construction
- Opened: 1969

Tenants
- Vancouver 86ers and Whitecaps (various leagues) 1987–2010; Simon Fraser University Clan (GNAC) 1969–2007, 2014–2015; Vancouver Riptide (AUDL) 2013–2017; TSS FC Rovers; (USL2) 2017–2020, (L1BC) 2022–present; TSS FC Rovers Women; (WPSL) 2018–2020, (L1BC) 2022–present; Whitecaps FC 2 (MLSNP) 2022–present; Vancouver Rise FC (NSL) 2025–present

Swangard Stadium is a multi-purpose stadium in Central Park in Burnaby, British Columbia. Primarily used for soccer, rugby, football, and athletics, the stadium also used to be home to the Simon Fraser Clan football team and the Vancouver Whitecaps while they were in the Canadian Soccer League (CSL) and various US-based Division 2 leagues. It opened on April 26, 1969, and has a capacity of 5,288.

== History ==
In 1969, Vancouver Sun sports journalist Erwin Swangard raised nearly $1 million for the construction of an athletic stadium in Central Park in Burnaby, British Columbia. British Columbia Premier W. A. C. Bennett officially named the stadium after Swangard at its opening on April 26, 1969. Swangard was not present on the day of the opening, having been sent to start a newspaper in Nigeria, and was instead represented by his wife Doris.

=== Vancouver Whitecaps ===
The city of Vancouver launched a professional soccer team in 1986, named the Vancouver 86ers (now known as the Whitecaps). The Canadian Soccer League (CSL) club began playing in 1987 and made Swangard Stadium their home pitch. The stadium served its last season as the Whitecaps' home in 2010, as the club joined Major League Soccer (MLS) in 2011. As Swangard does not meet MLS standards for capacity, the City of Burnaby initially proposed to keep the team in Burnaby by renovating the stadium and expanding its capacity to 20,000 seats. This plan, however, fell through, and the Whitecaps eventually decided they wanted to move to a new, larger soccer-specific home at the Whitecaps Waterfront Stadium. Currently the Whitecaps are playing at BC Place Stadium and president of the organization, Bob Lenarduzzi has stated the club intends to stay at BC Place for the time being and plans for a new stadium are all on hold.

On July 8, 2026, the Vancouver Whitecaps returned to the stadium for one game to host a Canadian Championship quarterfinal match, as BC Place was unavailable due to the 2026 FIFA World Cup. In the match, the Whitecaps defeated Cavalry FC 4–1.

=== International events ===
The stadium's capacity was temporarily increased to 10,000 for the 2007 FIFA U-20 World Cup. In the past, it has hosted home games for the Canadian men's and women's soccer teams in Olympic and World Cup qualifying. In some cases, crowds in excess of 10,000 have witnessed games, with many of the fans standing. Swangard has also been the host stadium of the 2002 FIFA U-19 Women's World Championship.

=== Other events ===
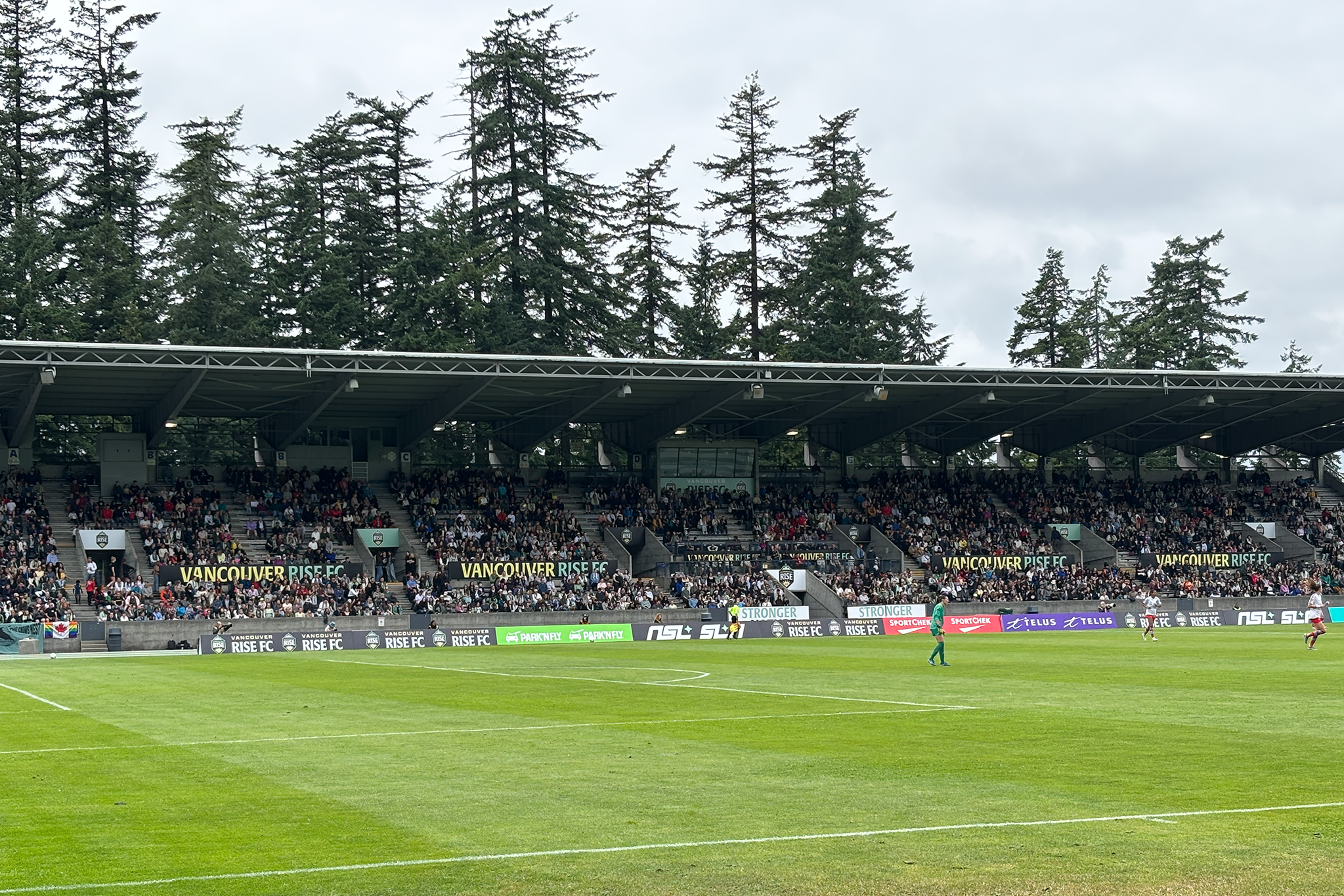
The crowd for the Vancouver Rise vs Montréal Roses of the Northern Super League in 2025

In 2013, the Vancouver Riptide, a professional ultimate team competing in the American Ultimate Disc League, became a tenant of Swangard Stadium but they ended play at end of 2017 season and are being moved to Portland, Oregon for the 2020 season.

In June 2014, Simon Fraser Clan announced that Swangard Stadium would be their football team's home field for the 2014 season. The Clan returned to their campus again starting with the 2016 season.

It is also used very frequently for track and field meets in the Lower Mainland.

In March 2015, the first Quidditch Canada National Championship took place at the stadium.

The TSS FC Rovers played their home soccer games there starting in the 2017 season when they played in the USL League Two Northwest Division. The TSS FC Rovers Women's team of the Women's Premier Soccer League also use the stadium as their home. They started play in the 2018 season. Starting in the 2022 season, both men's and women's teams will play in the new League1 British Columbia (L1BC) soccer league.

The Whitecaps FC 2, the MLS Next Pro reserve team of Vancouver Whitecaps FC, moved to the stadium in March 2022. Vancouver Rise FC of the Northern Super League play at Swangard, having played their inaugural match at BC Place.
