= Aulagromyza hamata =

Scientific classification
- Kingdom: Animalia
- Phylum: Arthropoda
- Class: Insecta
- Order: Diptera
- Family: Agromyzidae
- Subfamily: Phytomyzinae
- Genus: Aulagromyza
- Species: A. hamata

Binomial name
- Aulagromyza hamata (Hendel, 1932)

Synonyms
- Phytagromyza hamata Hendel, 1932

Species of fly

Aulagromyza hamata is a species of fly in the family Agromyzidae.

== Distribution ==
Turkey.
