= Erwin Swangard =

German-Canadian journalist

Erwin Swangard (11 May 1908 – 5 May 1993) was a German-born journalist. Swangard Stadium is named after him.

== Biography ==
Swangard was born in Munich, Germany in 1908. He emigrated to Canada in 1930.

As a journalist, he covered the 1936 Olympic Games for the Vancouver Sun and the Toronto Globe. From 1951 to 1959, he undertook various editorial roles at the Vancouver Sun, concluding as managing editor.

In sports development, Swangard founded the Tournament of Soccer Champions in British Columbia, which expanded from 70 to 2,500 teams. He also contributed to the inception of the BC Lions and was instrumental in establishing Swangard Stadium in Burnaby's Central Park in 1969.

Between 1976 and 1989, Swangard served at the Pacific National Exhibition (PNE), during which the event underwent significant changes. For his community efforts, he was awarded the Paul Harris Fellowship Award in 1987 and became a Member of the Order of Canada in 1989.
