= Alexander Jan Reitsma =

Dutch economist

Alexander Jan Reitsma (1919-1982) was a Dutch economist, a lecturer in international economics at the University of Queensland and a professor of international economics at Erasmus University in Rotterdam.

== Origin in The Netherlands ==
Reitsma was born on 17 August 1919 in Dordrecht (The Netherlands) as the son of Alexander Jan Reitsma (1888-1973) and Jacoba van der Meulen (1887-1987). His father was co-owner of the NV Dordtsche Glashandel, a small company that produced stained glass.

After completing high school in Dordrecht, Reitsma studied economics at the Netherlands University for Economics (Nederlandsche Economische Hoogeschool, NEH) in nearby Rotterdam. He completed his undergraduate studies in 1938, and his graduate studies in 1941. During 1942-1945 he worked at the National Office for Food Supply (Rijksbureau voor de Voedselvoorziening).

== 1946-1950 in Makassar, Indonesia ==
In 1946 Reitsma enlisted with the Netherlands Indies Civil Administration (NICA) and left for Indonesia. He was based in Makassar, where he worked in the Ministry of Economic Affairs (Kementerian Perekonomian) of the State of East Indonesia (Negara Indonesia Timur). In 1949, Reitsma was Head of the Section Documentation and Announcements. He contributed part-time to the teaching program at the Faculty of Economics of the University of Indonesia in Makassar (now Hasanuddin University) when it started in 1948.

In Makassar, Reitsma became engaged to Dorothy Margaret Coulter (25 September 1927 – 4 September 1983) in 1946. Coulter had worked at the NICA in her hometown of Brisbane (Australia) where it prepared for the Dutch return to Indonesia during 1944-1945. Her work at NICA took her to Makassar. In 1949, the pair married, spent a 3-month honeymoon in the Netherlands, and had their first son, Dirk Jan, in Makassar.

== 1950-1963 in Brisbane, Australia ==
Following Indonesia's independence, Reitsma and his family moved to Coulter's hometown of Brisbane in 1950, where Reitsma took the position of Associate Lecturer in economics at the University of Queensland in August 1950. He was one of the first Dutch nationals to be appointed at an Australian university. He lectured in the relatively new subject of international economics.

Reitsma was an active researcher at the University of Queensland and contributed to a major study of the Australian banking sector. He also researched Australia's trade policy and prepared a book-length study. During a year of sabbatical leave in 1960, Reitsma defended this study as a doctoral thesis at the NEH in Rotterdam. It was published that year as a book.

The study was milestone in the analysis of trade policy in Australia, where the need for trade protection of manufacturing industry had become a widely shared article of faith since the 1920s. Reitsma's study probed the efficacy of some of the main arguments in support of trade tariffs, such as that they redistribute income and secure high living standards, that they prevent a deterioration of the terms of trade, and that they lead to ‘external economies’ that promote economic growth. The study put these arguments to theoretical and empirical tests and concluded that only the last is likely to hold.

Reitsma's study was one of the first shots across the bow of trade protection in Australia. It took until later in the 1960s for other economists to unleash a barrage of arguments against trade protection, and until the early-1970s before the Australian government started to dismantle trade protection.

Reitsma was socially active in the Dutch-Australian Society in Queensland. In Brisbane, Reitsma and Coulter had three more children; Coby, Pim and Miranda.

== 1963-1981 in Rotterdam and Tilburg, The Netherlands ==
Reitsma was promoted to Senior Lecturer in 1958. He accepted a professorship in international economics at the NEH in Rotterdam, starting in 1963. During 1964-1980, he was also Professor in international economics at the Royal Military Academy (KMA) in Tilburg. During 1975-1977 he was Dean of Economics at NEH and saw the university's transformation to what is now the Erasmus University in Rotterdam.

Reitsma focused his research on international monetary economics, particularly the process towards monetary integration in the European Community (EC) during the 1960s and 1970s. His research took shape in the context of the 1969 European Council decision to work towards a European economic and monetary union, and the 1970 Werner Report that created a 10-year time table to put this aspiration in effect. In his publications, Reitsma outlined some of the economic advantages of monetary integration and minimisation of exchange rate fluctuations across EC member countries, but he queried whether all of the EC member countries together formed an optimal currency area.

The publications on both the Australian tariff and on monetary integration demonstrate Reitsma's ability to bring together the main writings in either field – both theoretical and applied – present and contrast the arguments succinctly, and relate them to empirical research, before offering a synthesis.

Reitsma died after a short illness on 25 May 1981 at the age of 61.

== Publications ==
- Reitsma, A.J. (1958) ‘Trade and the redistribution of income: Is there still an Australian case?’, The Economic Record, 34(68) 172-188.
- Gifford, J.K.; Wood, J. Vivian and Reitsma A.J. (1960) Australian Banking. St.Lucia: University of Queensland Press.
- Reitsma, A.J. (1960) Trade Protection in Australia. Leiden: H.E. Stenfert Kroese; St.Lucia: University of Queensland Press.
- Reitsma, A.J. (1961) ‘The "excess costs" of a tariff and their measurement’, The Economic Record, 37(80) 442-455.
- Reitsma, A.J. (1962) ‘Australian policy of tariff protection and primary industry’, Australian Journal of Agricultural and Resource Economics, 6(1) 68-79.
- Reitsma, A.J. (1963) ‘Recente ontwikkelingen in de theorie van de betalingsbalans’ [Recent advances in balance of payments theory, De Economist, 111(11) 721-741 (inaugural lecture).
- Reitsma, A.J. (1968) ‘Rondom de val van het pond’ [On the fall of the pound], Economisch-Statistische Berichten (3 January 1968), 6.
- Reitsma, A.J. (1969) ‘Wisselkoersvariaties en economische integratie’ [Exchange rate variations and economic integration], Economisch-Statistische Berichten (17 September 1969), no. 2713.
- Reitsma, A.J. (1969) ‘Internationale monetaire problemen’ [International monetary problems], De Economist, 117(6) 599-614.
- Reitsma, A.J. (1970) ‘Problemen rond een E.E.G. monetaire unie’ [Problems surrounding the EEC's monetary union], Maandschrift economie, 35(3) 145-158.
- Reitsma, A.J. (1972) ‘De monetaire crisis, het vraagstuk van het optimale valuta-areaal en de Europese Monetaire Unie’ [The monetary crisis, the problem of optimal currency area and the European Monetary Union], De Economist, 120(2) 153-174.
- Reitsma, A.J. (1972) ‘Currency areas and all that’, The Bankers’ Magazine, 213 (March 1972) 105-108.
- Reitsma, A.J. (1972) ‘De Europese Monetaire Unie’ The European Monetary Union] in De Europese Monetaire Unie; Preadviezen van de Vereniging voor de Staathuishoudkunde. (The Hague: Martinus Nijhoff) 1-26.
- Reitsma, A.J. (1973) ‘Het probleem van de taakverdeling tussen de instrumenten van economische politiek in verband met het interne en externe evenwicht, vaste koersen en mobiel kapitaal: Enkele kanttekeningen’ [The problem of allocation of tasks between economic policy instruments in relation to the internal and external equilibrium, fixed exchange rates and mobile capital: Some observations], in L.H. Klaassen, J. R. Zuidema, W. Begeer (eds.) Economie dezer dagen. (Rotterdam: Universitaire Pers Rotterdam) 163-190
- Reitsma, A.J. (1981) ‘Monetaire unie en monetaire theorie’ [Monetary union and monetary theory]. IER Discussion paper 7818/GM. Rotterdam: Institute for Economic Research, Erasmus University.
- Reitsma, A.J. (1981) Internationale Monetaire Ontwikkelingen in de Jaren Zeventig: Afscheidscollege. [International monetary developments in the 1970s: Valedictory lecture]. Breda: Koninklijke Militaire Academie.
