= Doreen Patterson Reitsma =

Female Canadian navy veteran

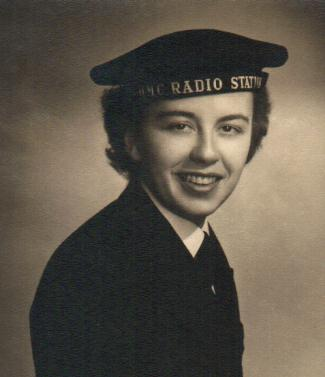
Patterson in 1951

Doreen Patterson Reitsma (December 12, 1927 – April 30, 2000) was the first woman from British Columbia to enter Canada's newly created Postwar Women's Division of the Royal Canadian Navy. She began her basic training on October 2, 1951, at HMCS Cornwallis in Cornwallis, Nova Scotia. She was trained as an elite radio intelligence operator for the wireless communications base at HMC NRS Coverdale. Coverdale was located near the city of Moncton, New Brunswick and was part of the Canada-USA Atlantic High Frequency Direction Finding Network responsible for the collection of military intelligence. Ms. Patterson was chosen to serve a term at the Naval Radio Station at Churchill, Manitoba in 1953–54. Here, she was part of a special force of eleven Wrens trained to live and work in extreme weather conditions. These Wrens are recognized as the only women in the Royal Canadian Navy's history to have ever served at the base in Churchill.

On January 26, 1955, Doreen Patterson helped inspire Prime Minister Louis St. Laurent and his cabinet to create a permanent and fully integrated regular force for women in the Royal Canadian Navy. This date not only marked an important milestone for women, but was considered to be an historic "first" in the British Commonwealth of Nations. It also helped open the door for thousands of Canadian women to follow in her footsteps. Ms. Patterson, in part, credited Mrs. Eleanor Roosevelt with giving her the inspiration to achieve her accomplishment after a meeting with the former First Lady at the Hotel Vancouver, where Doreen had worked in the 1940s.

Doreen Patterson was born and raised in Vancouver. She attended Lord Kitchener Elementary School, Point Grey Secondary School, and Lord Byng Secondary School. She was a member of the Elgar Choir of British Columbia throughout her youth, and was a member of the Daughters of Rebekah for nearly 40 years. She was married twice, adopted two children, was a daughter of Charles Bruce Patterson and Elva Eleanore (Elliott) Patterson of Vancouver, British Columbia, and was a granddaughter of Dugald Campbell Patterson and Frances Mabel (Webb) Patterson, of Burnaby, British Columbia, Canada. At retirement, Patterson Reitsma moved to Ladner, British Columbia, a suburb of Vancouver.
