= Thomas Webb & Sons =

English glass company

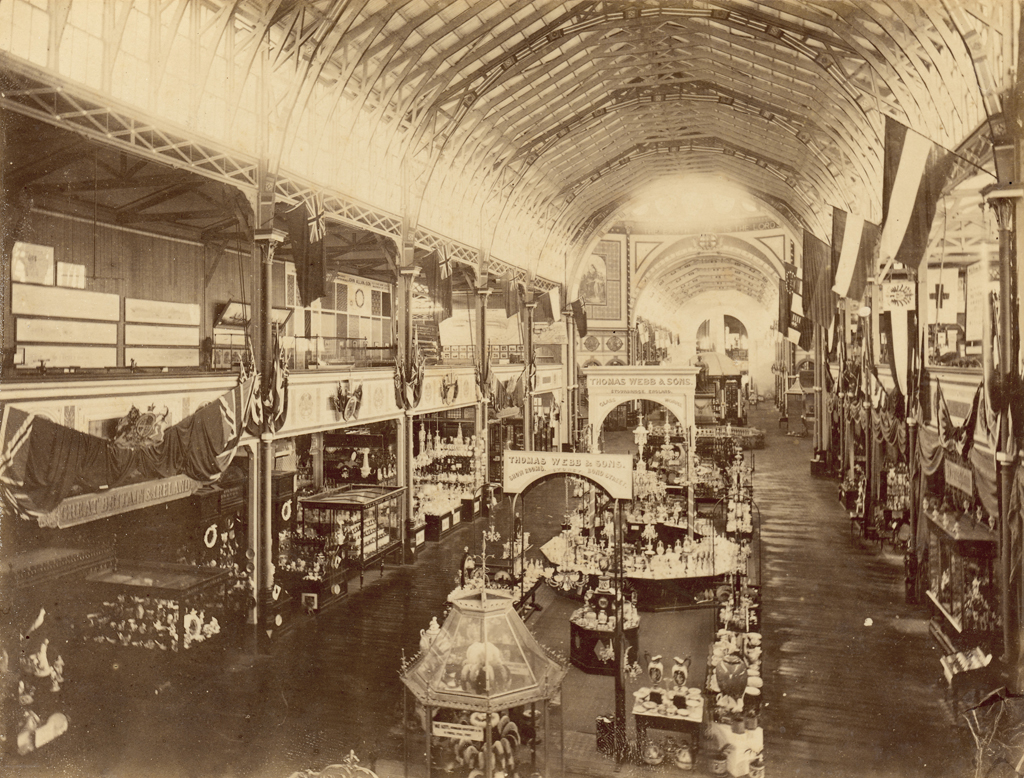
Thomas Webb & Sons at the Sydney International Exhibition, 1879

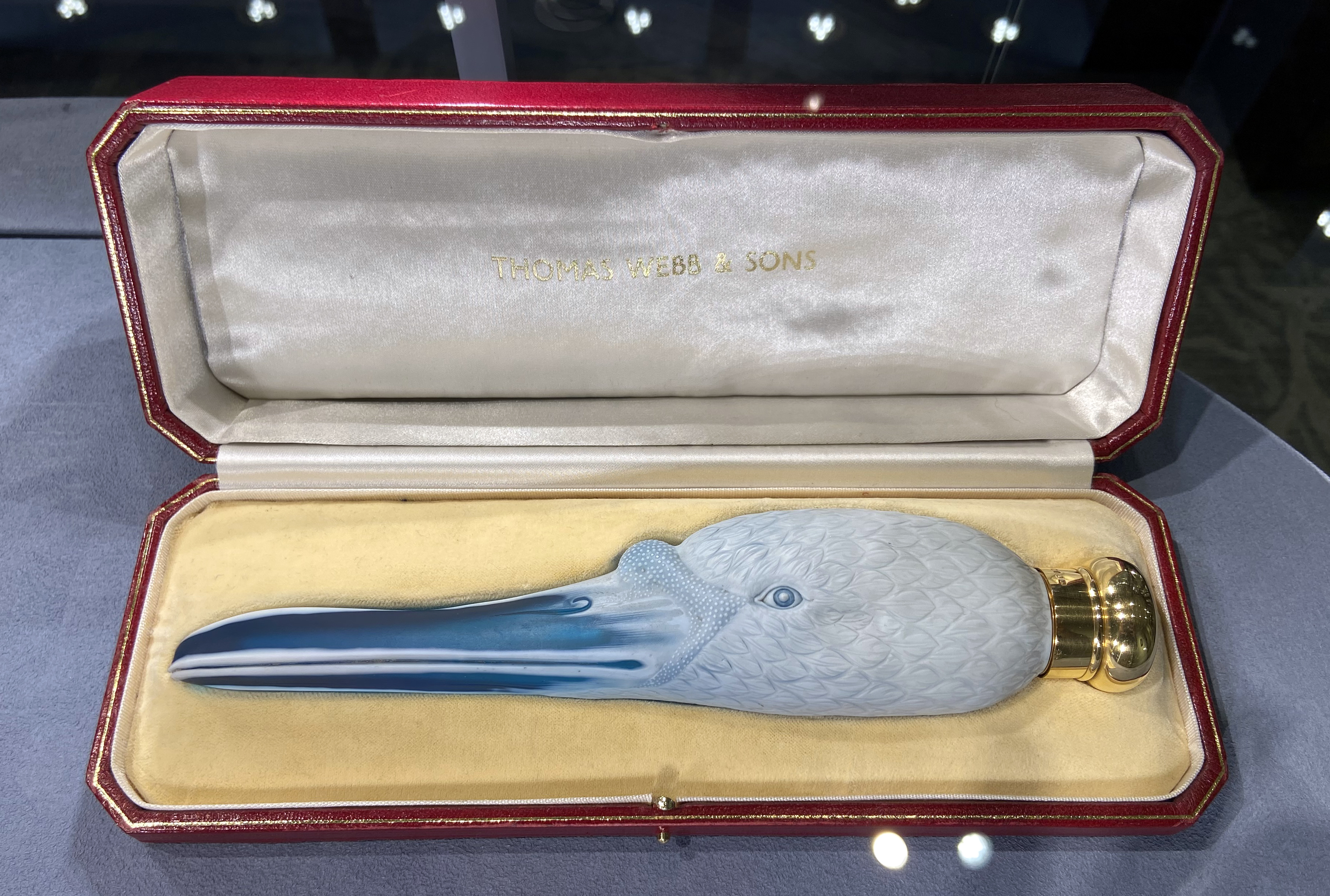
Swan Cameo Glass Perfume by Thomas Webb & Sons

Thomas Webb & Sons was an English glass company, founded in 1837 by Thomas Webb (1804-1869) near Stourbridge, England. The name T. Webb & Co. was adopted in 1842, and later became Thomas Webb & Sons. Webb operated the Platts glasshouse from 1837 to 1856 and then the Dennis glassworks from 1855 to 1990.

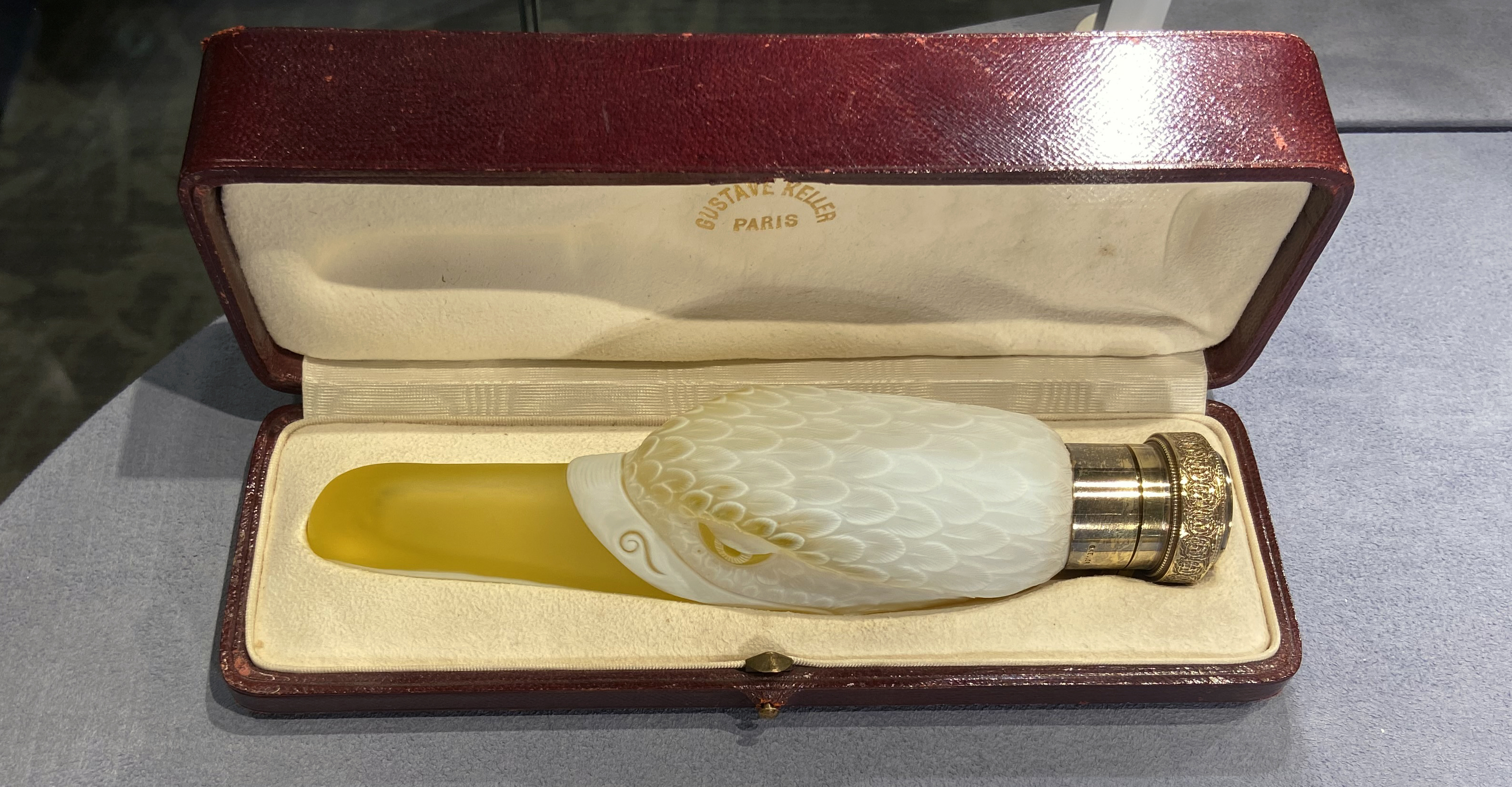
Albatross Cameo Glass Perfume by Thomas Webb & Sons

The company, known originally as the "Crystal King of England," was noted for the high quality of its Cameo glass. Cameo glass is created by a process of etching and carving through a layer of opaque white glass, leaving a white relief design on a darker colored glass body. Some pieces used two layers of etched glass to create a three-color Cameo glass product. In the 1870s John Northwood produced the first pieces, inspired by the Portland Vase. George Woodall would produce the most distinguished Webb Cameo work towards the end of the 19th century.

Some of the more finely made and valuable pieces were marked with the words "GEM CAMEO". Roman cameo glass itself was inspired by the earlier luxury tradition of engraved gemstones, known as cameos, and adapted that technique into glass.

In 1889 Thomas Webb & Sons secured an American patent for their process, and in that same year they received a Grand Prix for their exquisite colored glass at the 1889 Paris Exposition. They were part of the Tiffany & Co. exhibit at the exposition.

== Examples ==
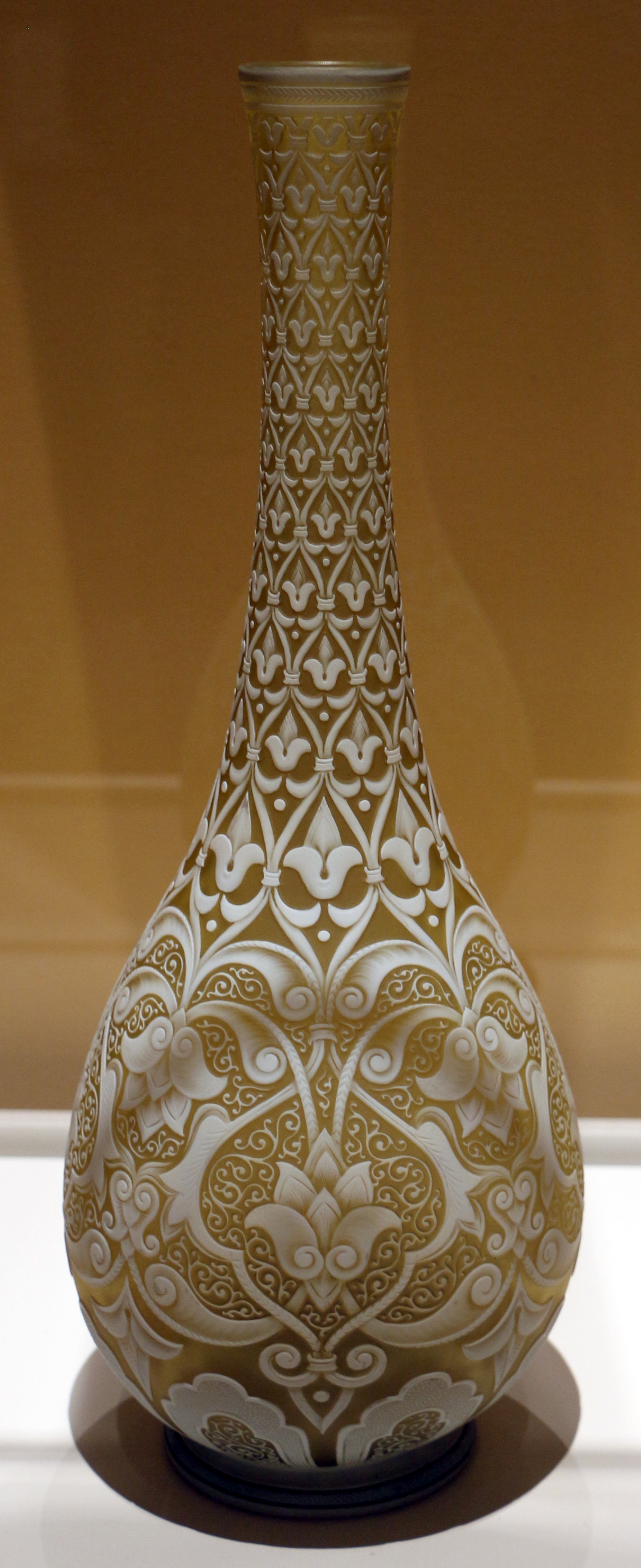
Vase by Thomas Webb, 1875–85

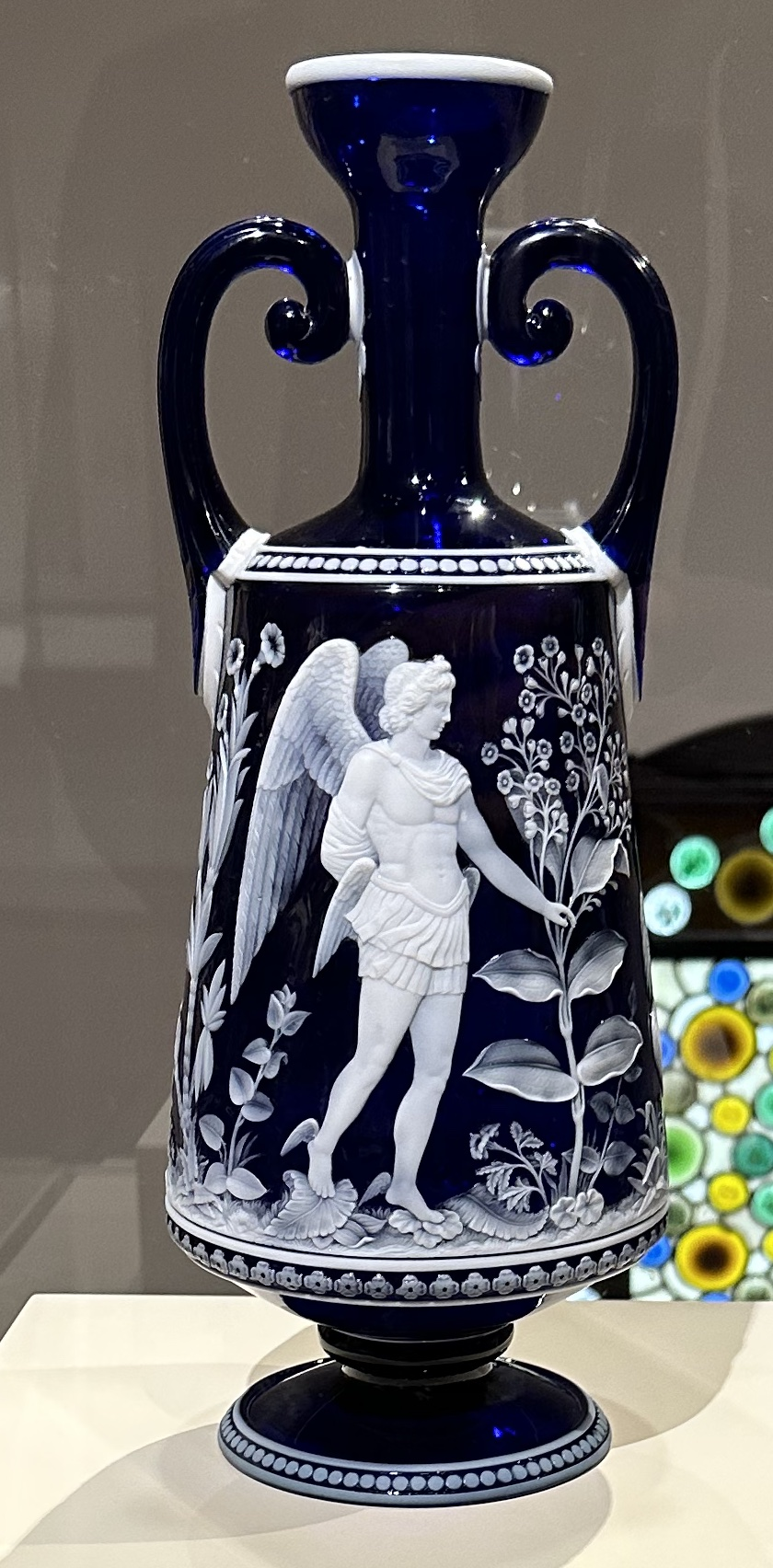
The Milton Vase, by John Northwood, 1878

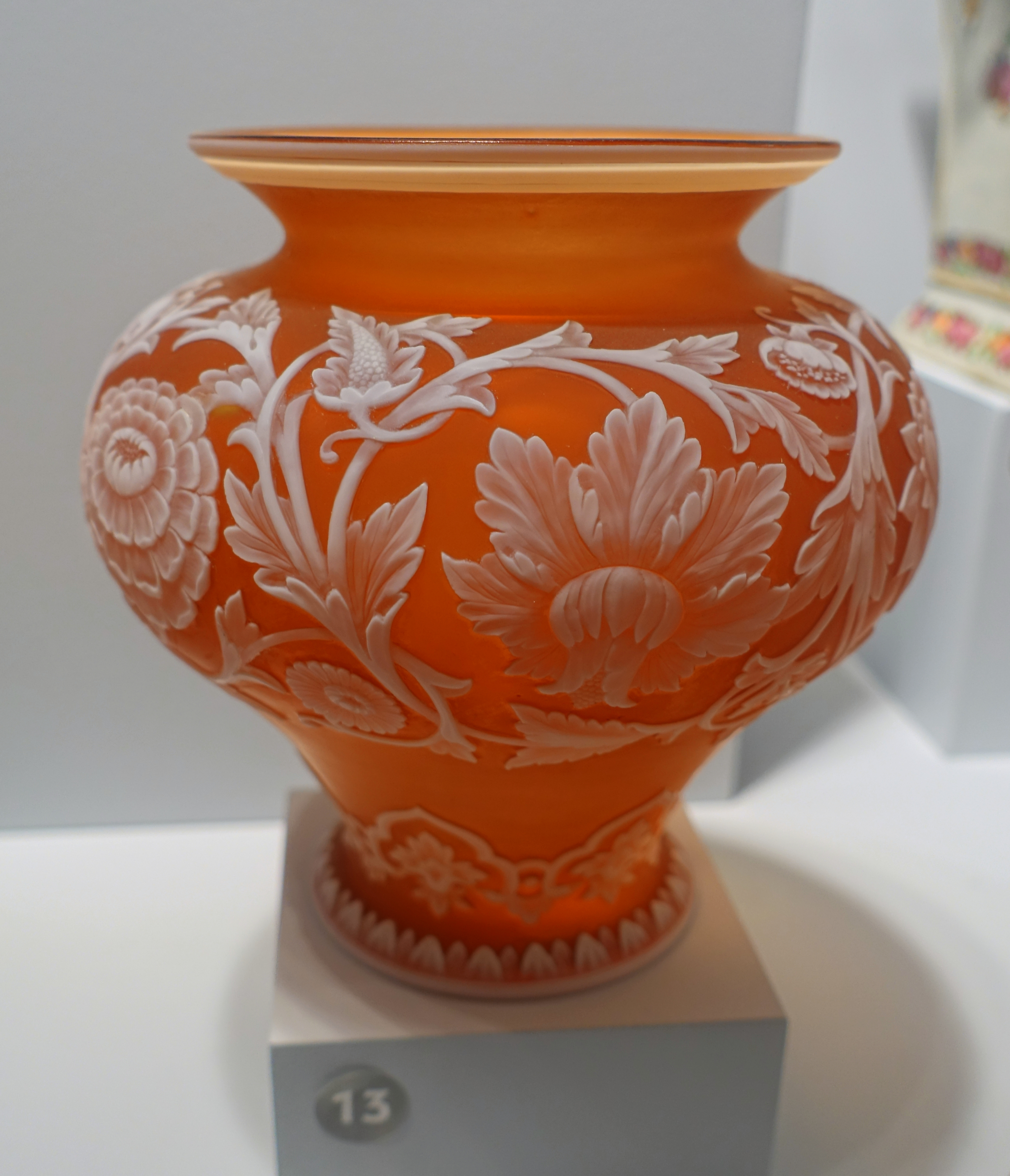
Vase, probably Thomas Webb & Sons, England, 1880–1900, Portland Museum of Art

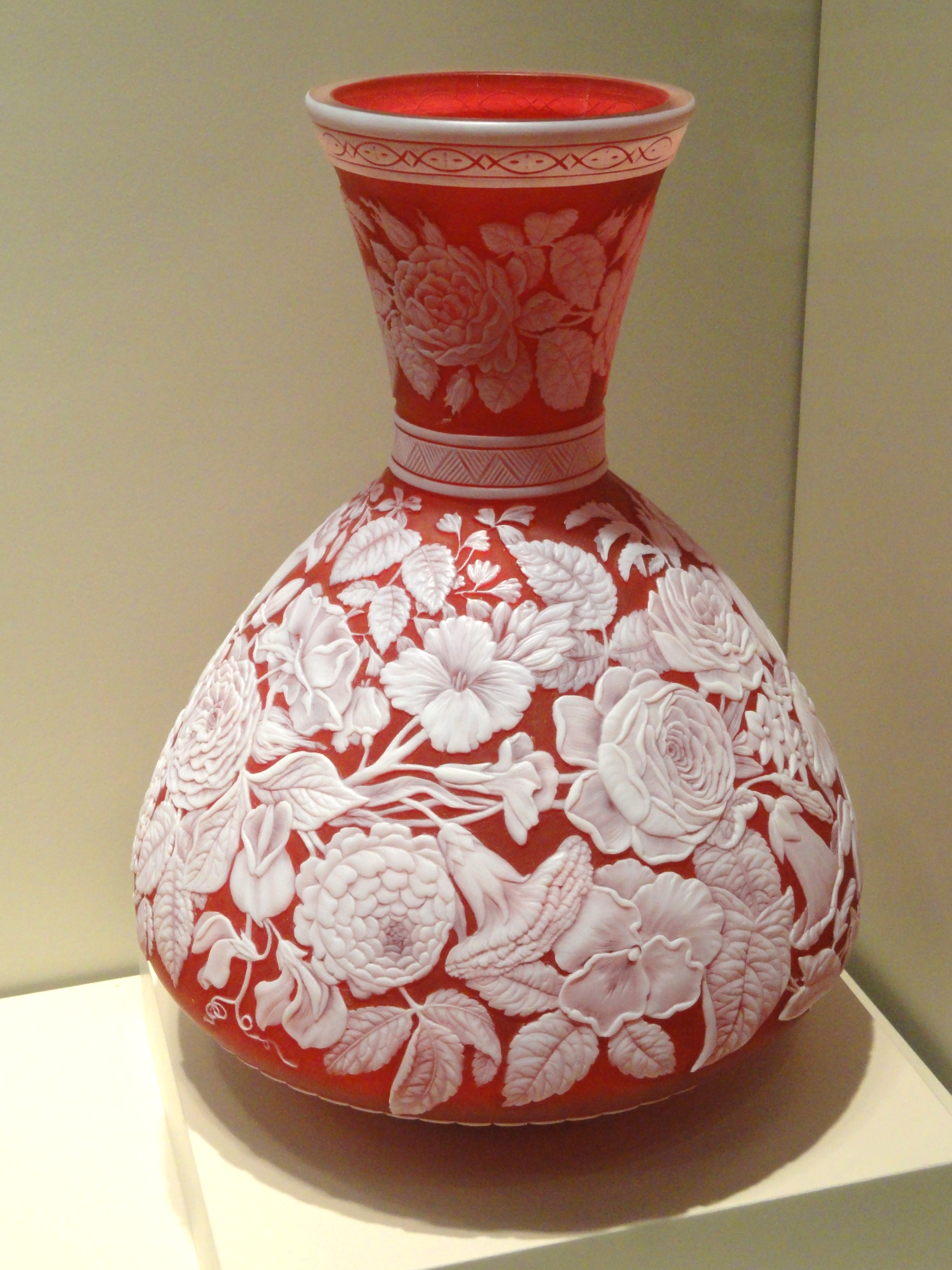
Vase by Thomas Webb & Sons, 1885-1890

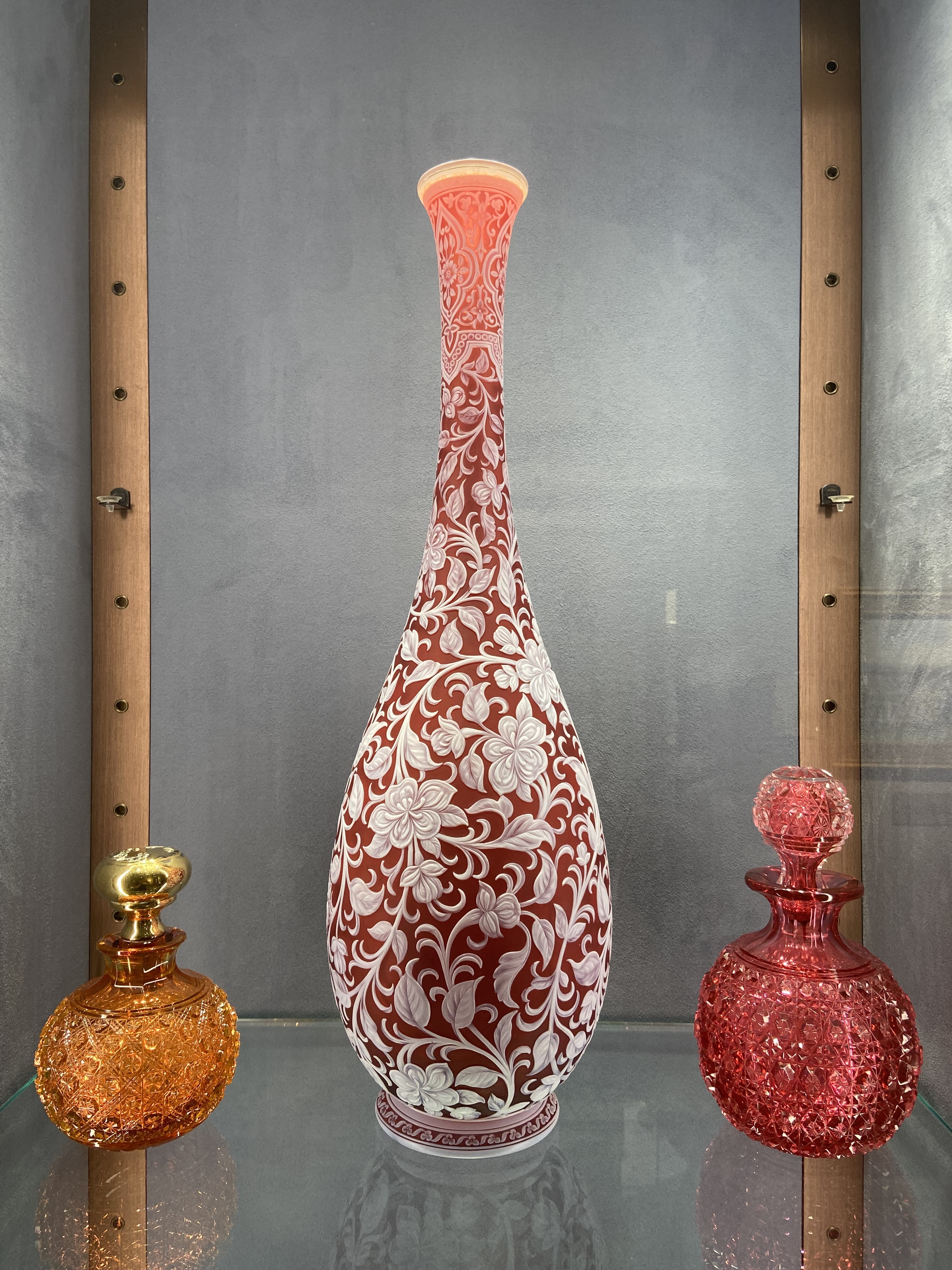
Cameo Glass Vase by Thomas Webb & Sons for Tiffany & Co., exhibited at Exposition Universelle in 1889

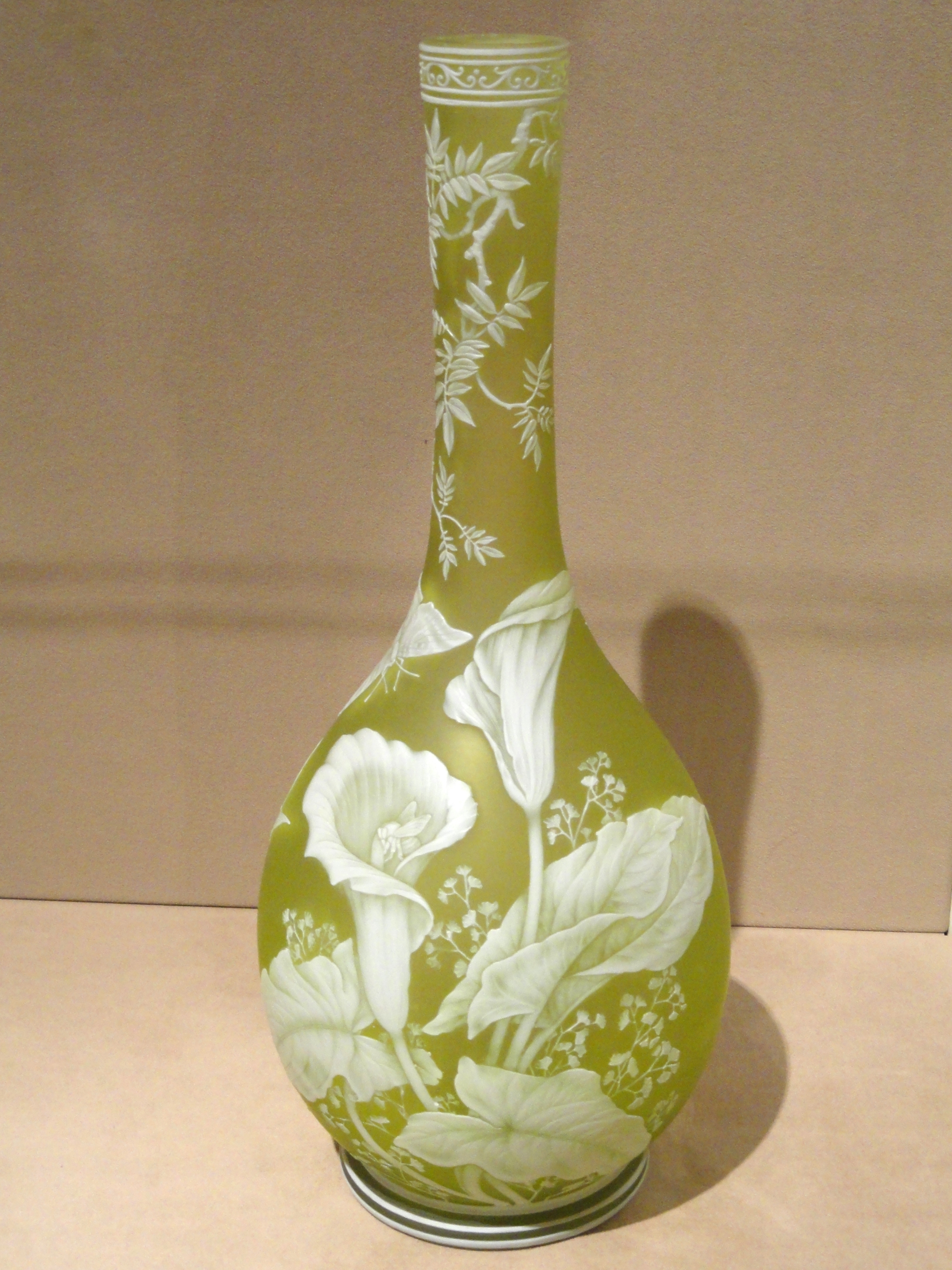
Vase attributed to Thomas Webb & Sons, c. 1890

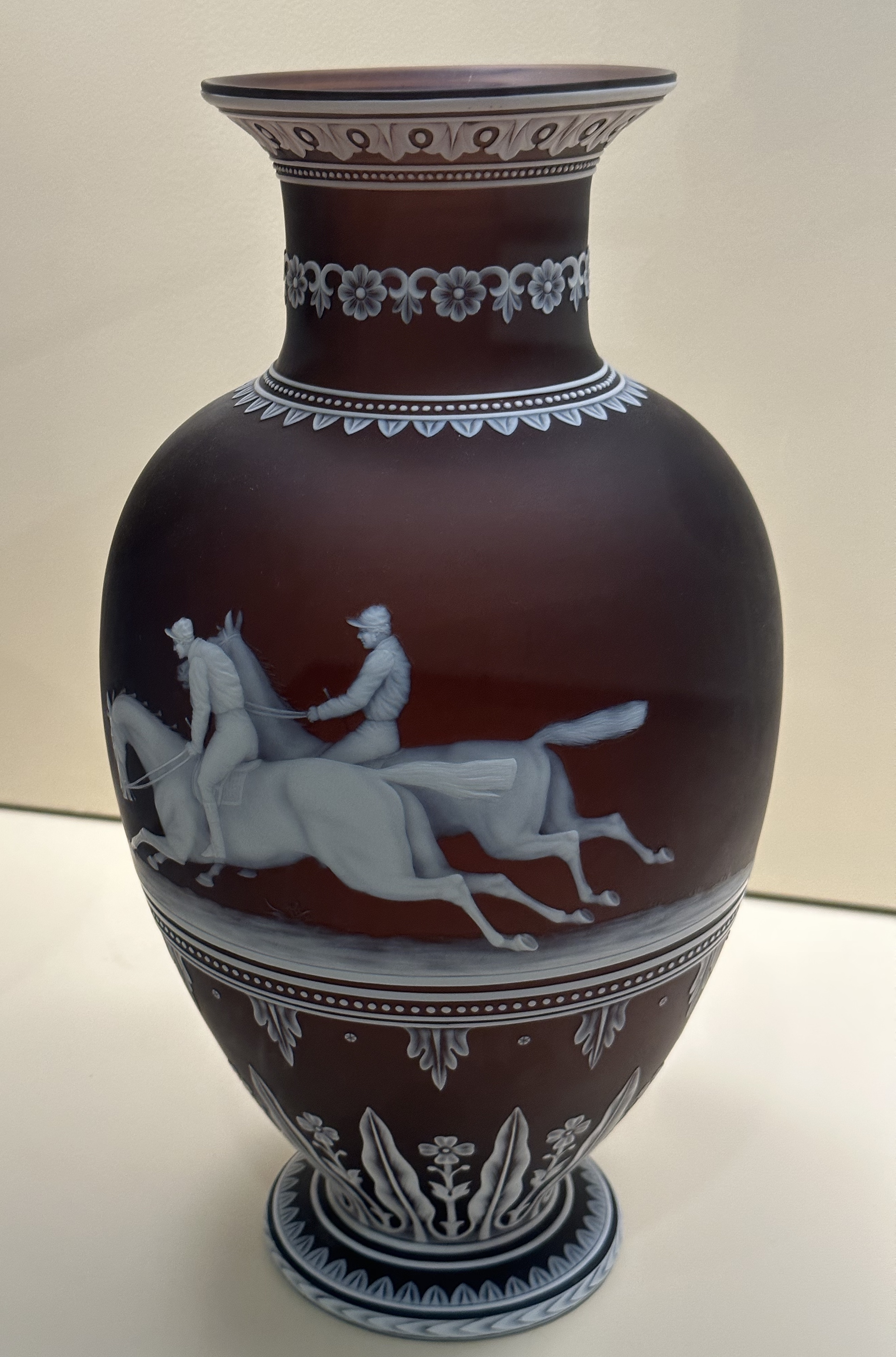
The Race, vase by George & Thomas Woodall, c. 1890

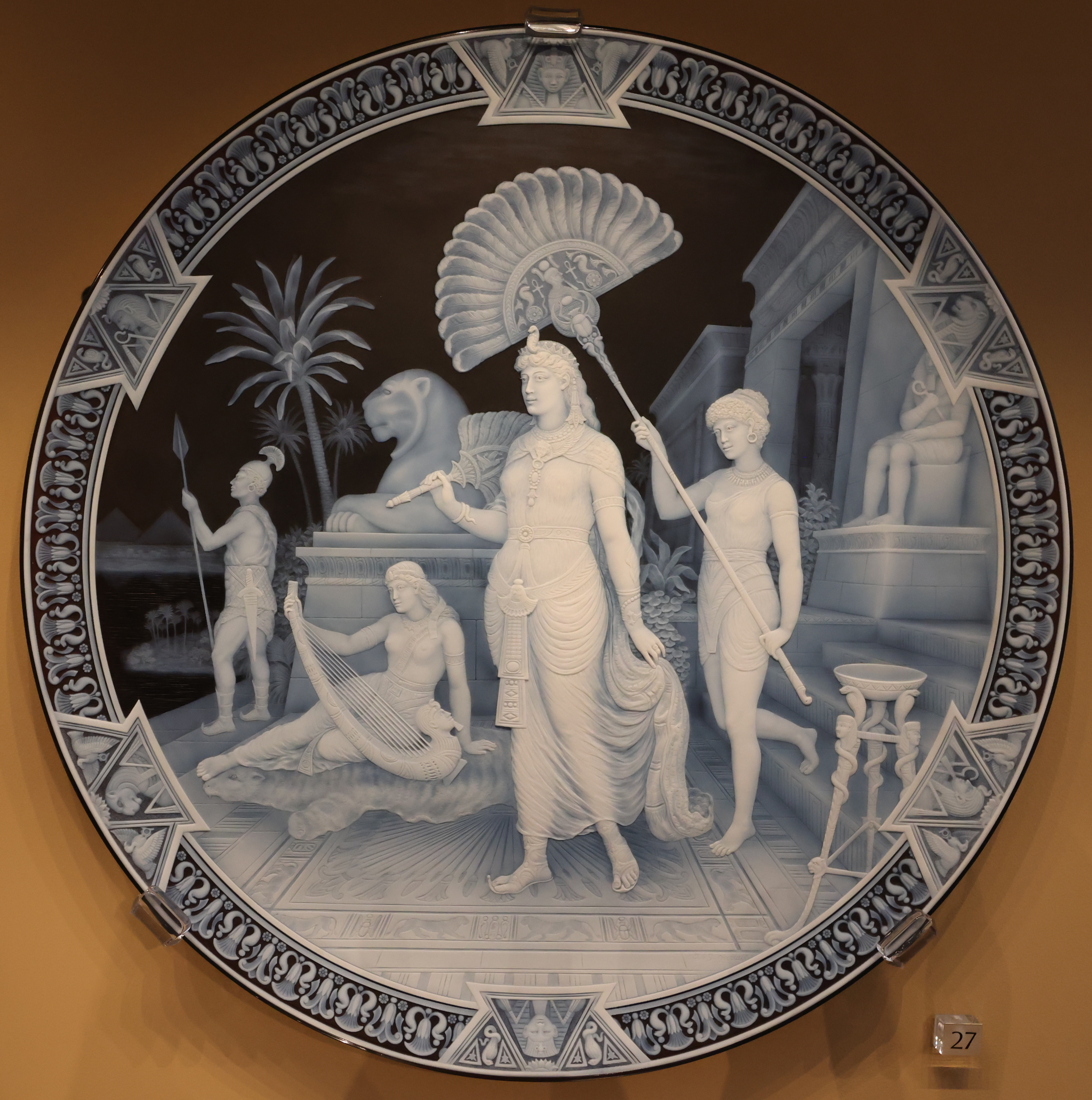
Cleopatra and Her Attendants, plaque by George & Thomas Woodall, c. 1898

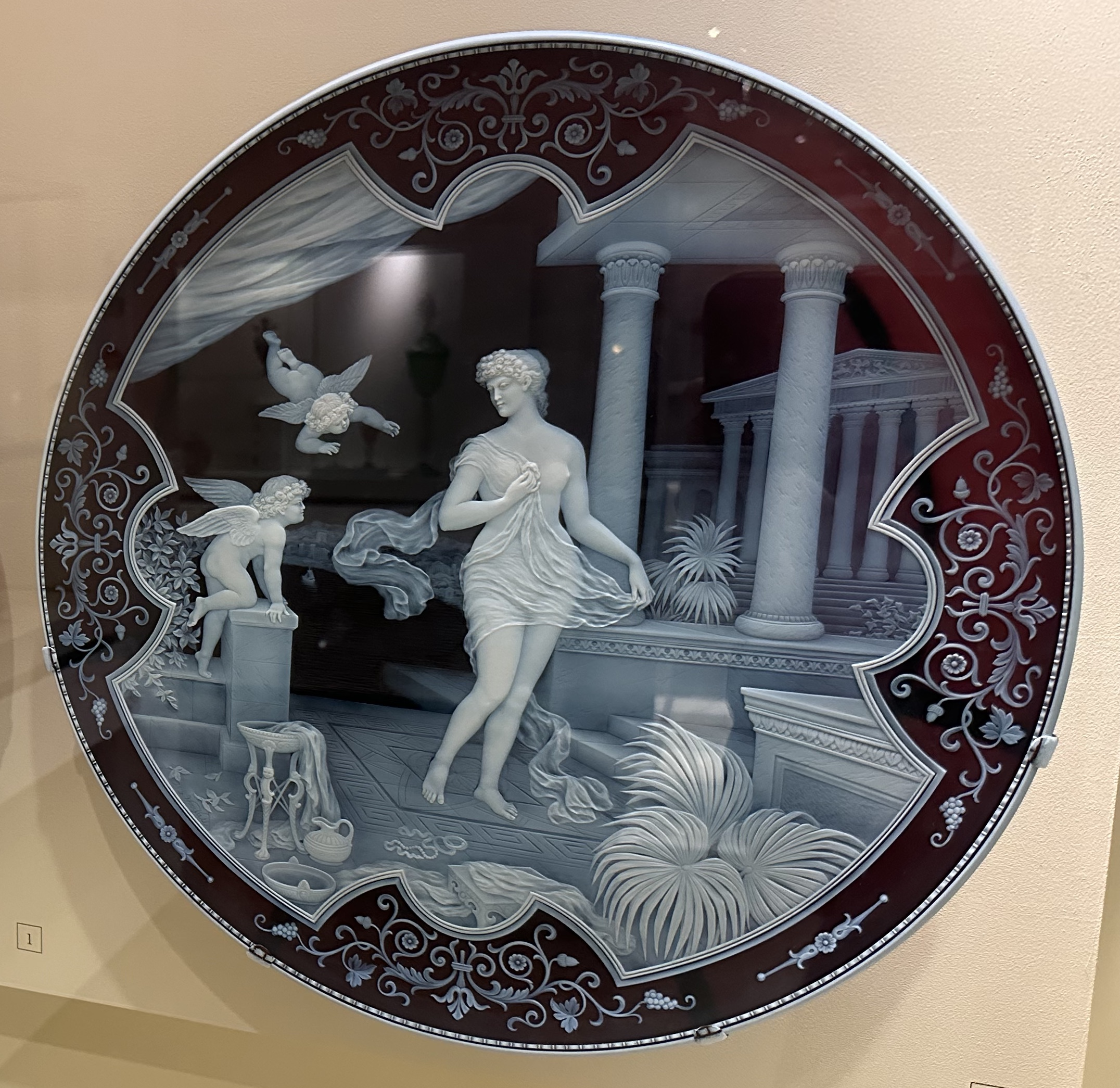
The Attack, plaque by George & Thomas Woodall, 1896
