= Thomas Webb (glassmaker) =

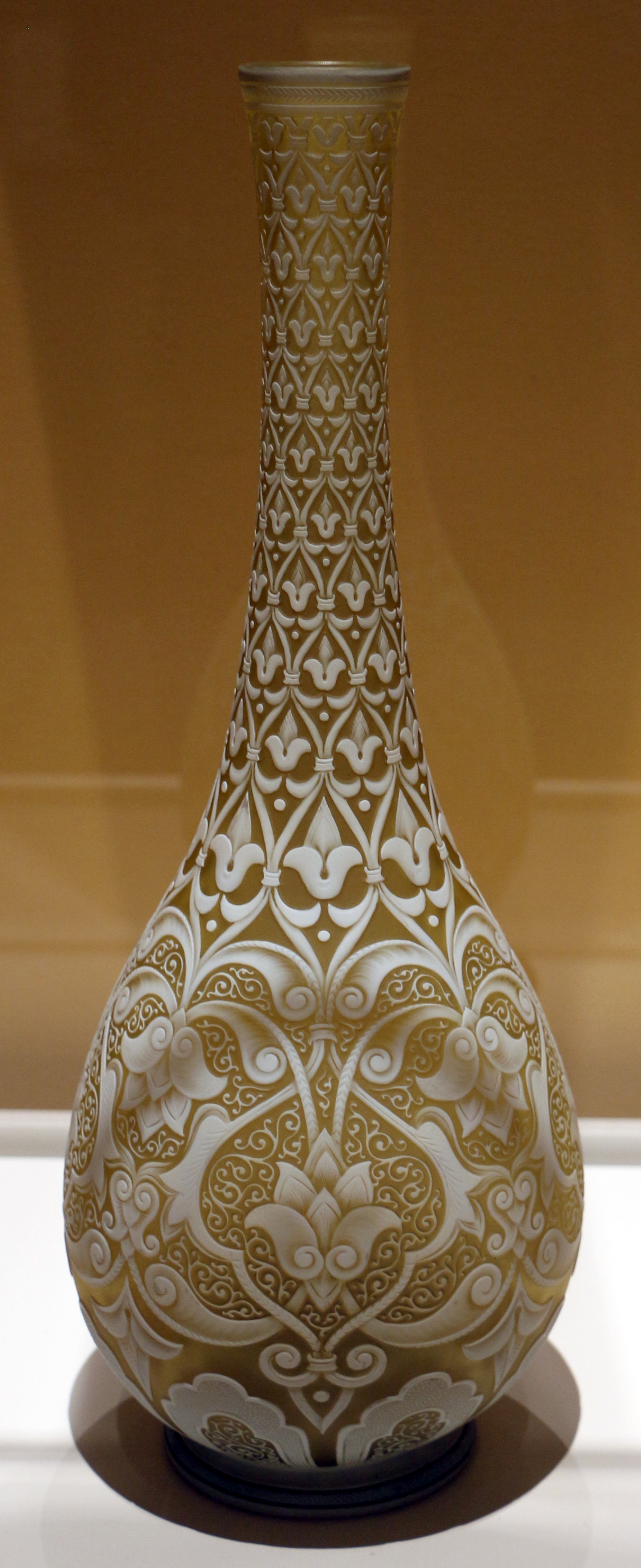
- Vase, 1875-85 ca.
- Born: 1804
- Died: 1869 (aged 64–65)
- Occupation: Glassmaker
- Organization: Thomas Webb & Sons

Thomas Webb (1804–1869) was an English glassmaker and the founder of Thomas Webb & Sons, makers of fine English glass and crystal. Webb entered the glass industry in 1829 when he became a partner in the Wordsley glassworks of Webb and Richardsons. Webb entered into business with his father, John Webb in 1833 at the White House glassworks prior to founding the company known as "Thomas Webb & Sons" in 1837. Webb moved to the Platts, Amblecote in 1840, then relocated to the Dennis Hall site, near the town of Stourbridge, England in 1855. Thomas Webb died in 1869 and was succeeded by his son Thomas Wilkes Webb.
