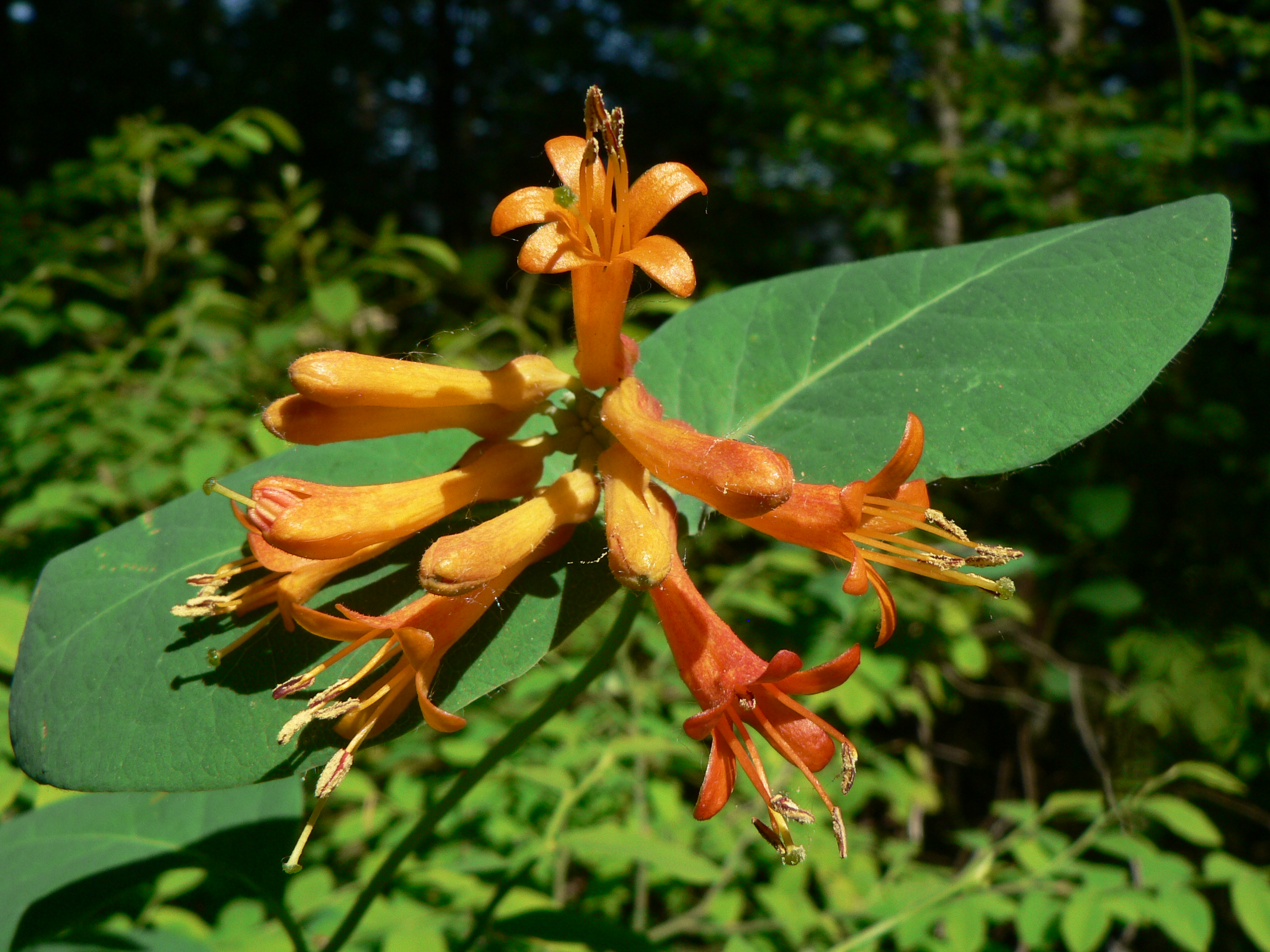

Scientific classification
- Kingdom: Plantae
- Clade: Tracheophytes
- Clade: Angiosperms
- Clade: Eudicots
- Clade: Asterids
- Order: Dipsacales
- Family: Caprifoliaceae
- Genus: Lonicera
- Species: L. ciliosa

Binomial name
- Lonicera ciliosa (Pursh) Poir. ex DC.

= Lonicera ciliosa =

Species of honeysuckle

Lonicera ciliosa, the orange honeysuckle or western trumpet honeysuckle is a honeysuckle native to forests of western North America.

== Description ==
A deciduous shrub growing to 6 metres (20 ft) tall with hollow twigs, the leaves are opposite, oval, 4–10 centimetres (1 1/2–4 in) long with the last pair on each twig merged to form a disk. The flowers are orange-yellow, 2–4 cm (3/4–1 1/2 in) long, with five lobes and trumpet shaped; they are produced in whorls above the disk-leaf on the ends of shoots. The fruit is a translucent orange-red berry less than 1 cm (3/8 in) diameter.

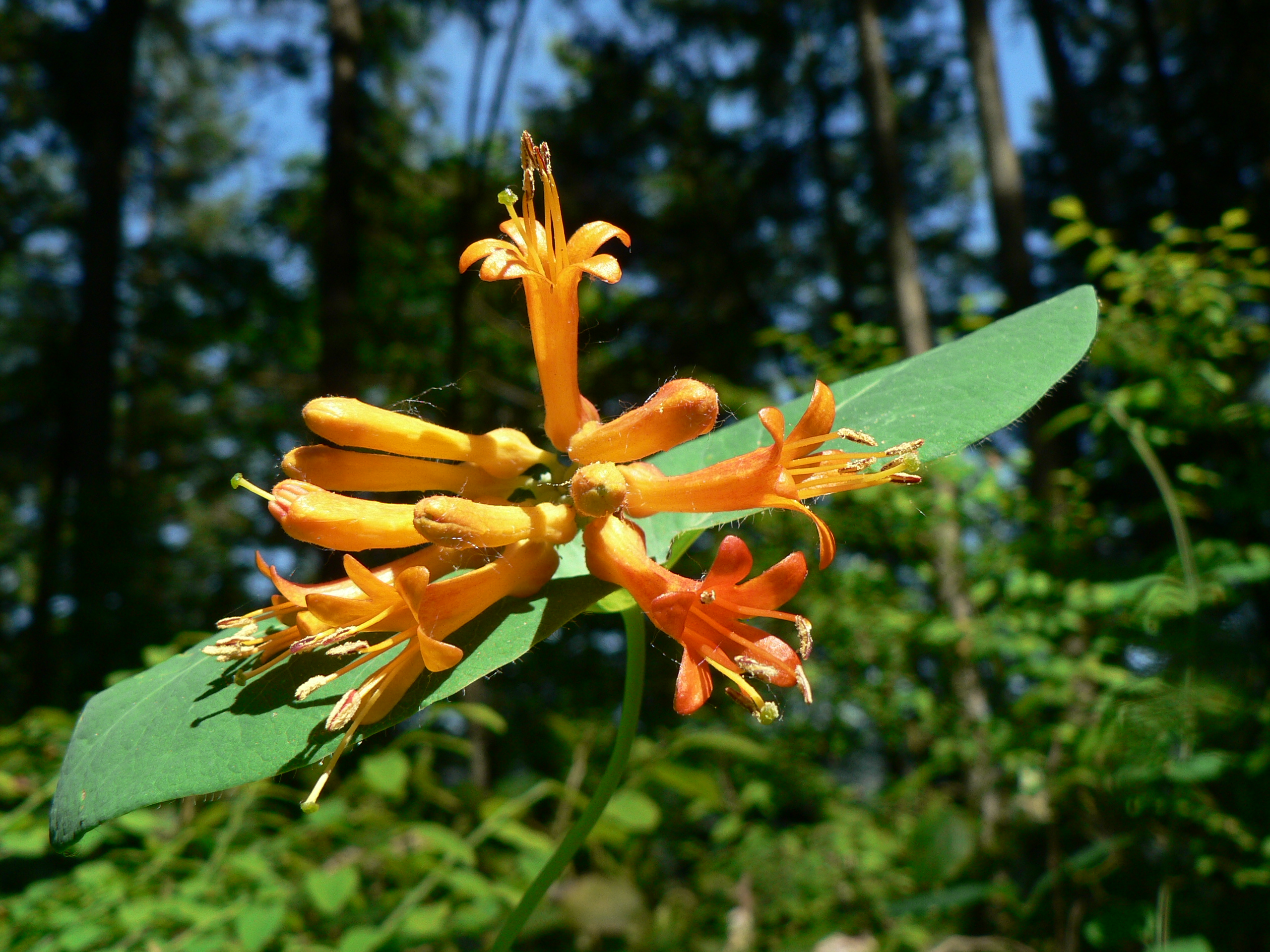
Blossoms

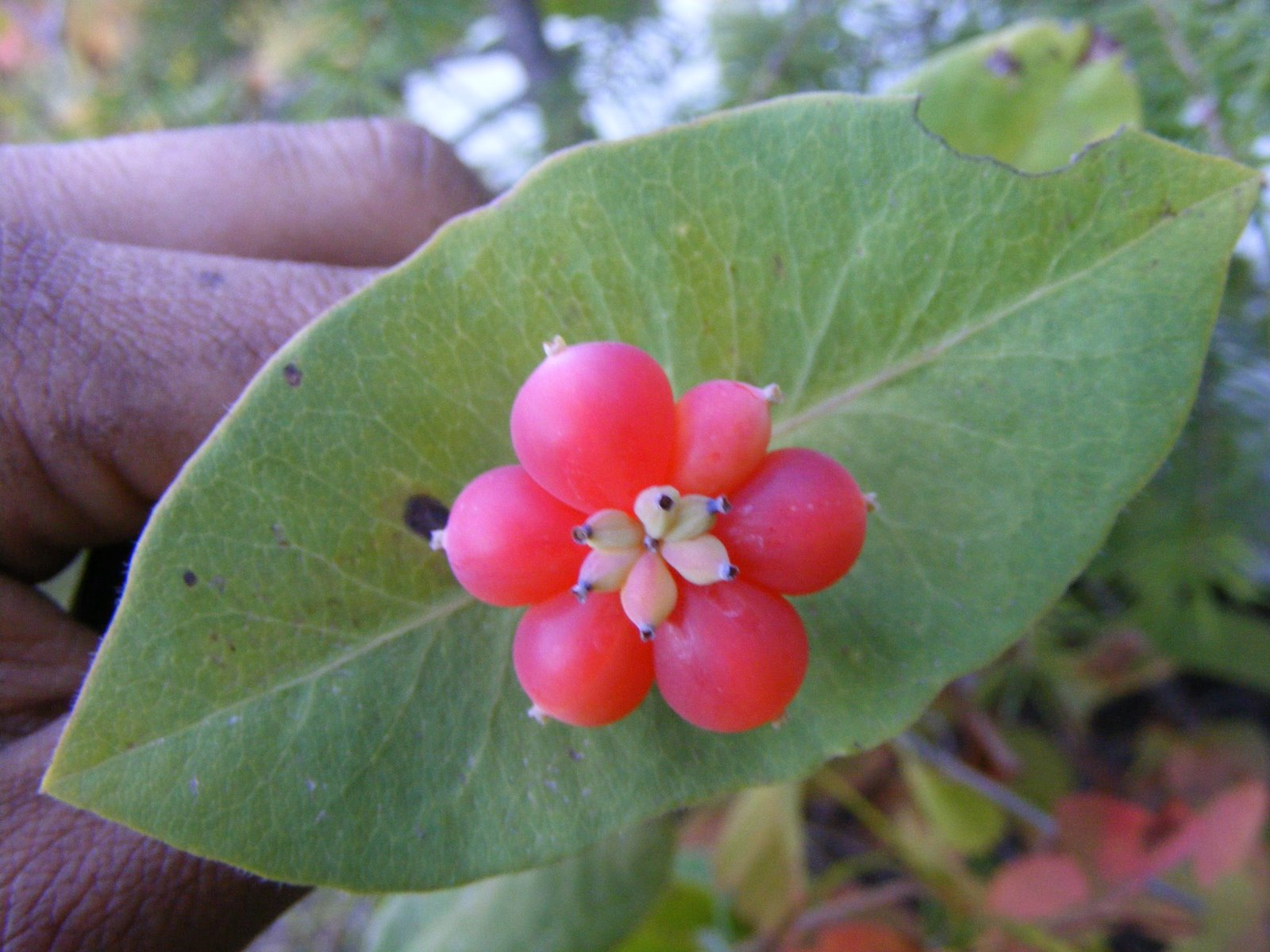
Close-up of the fruits

== Edibility ==
The fruits have traditionally been eaten by some Native American groups. However, modern sources caution that the berries may be mildly toxic and their edibility is not well established.

== Medicinal uses ==
The orange honeysuckle was used as cold medicine, a contraceptive, a sedative and even as a tuberculosis remedy.

== In culture ==
The species was one of the many florae recorded during Lewis and Clark's expeditions beginning in 1804.
