= Burnaby North Secondary School =

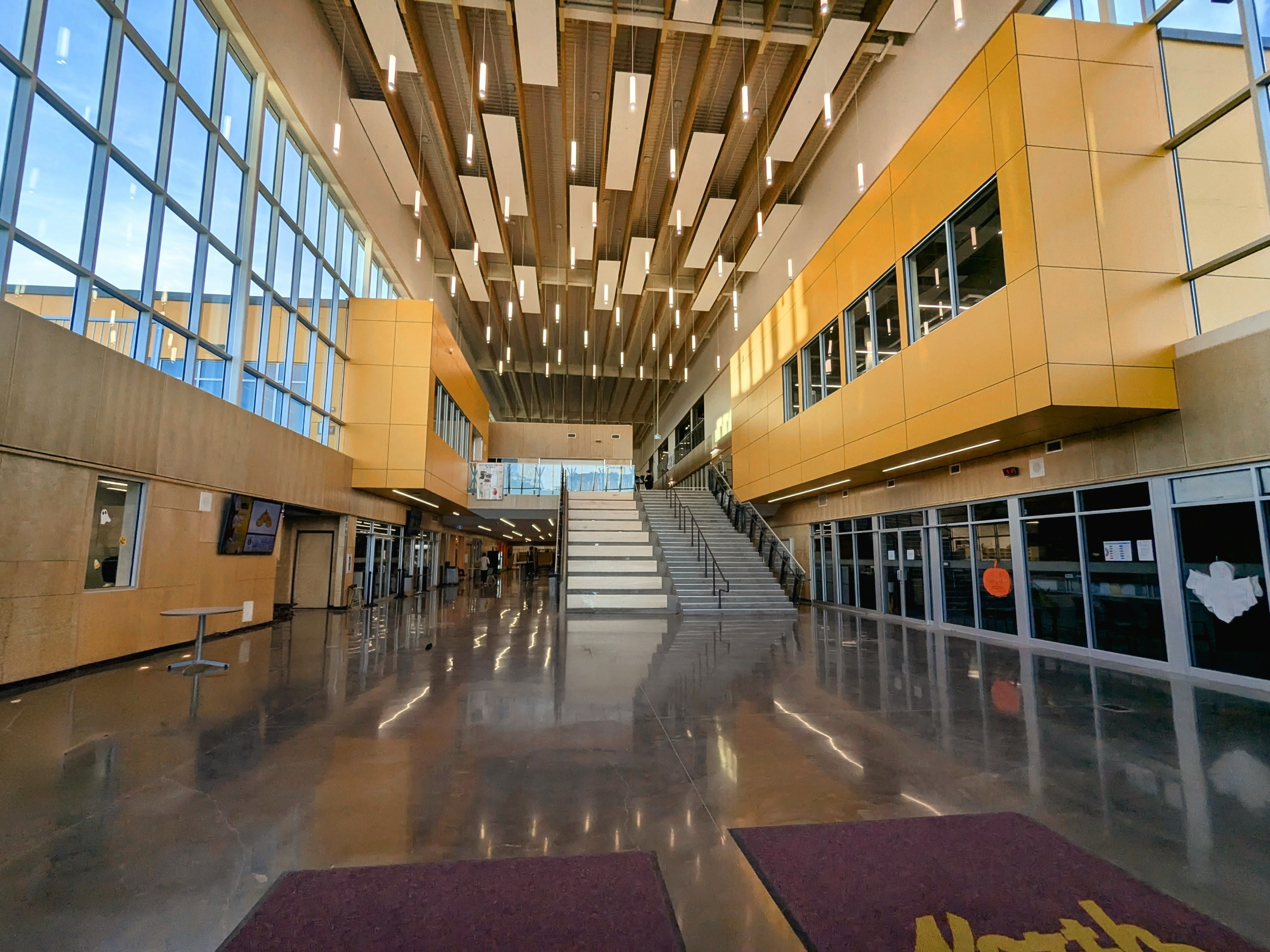
- Burnaby North Campus

Location
- 751 Hammarskjold Drive; Burnaby, British Columbia, V5B 4A1; Canada; 49°16′40″N 122°58′19″W

Information
- School type: Public secondary school
- Motto: Excellence, Discovery, Service
- Established: 1922
- School board: Burnaby School District 41
- Area trustee: Jen Mezei (Brentwood North Zone)
- Principal: Curtis Hodgson
- Grades: 8–12
- Enrollment: 1813 (September 2024)
- Colours: Maroon and gold
- Vice principal(s): Barry Callister, Maria Nickolidakis
- Website: north.burnabyschools.ca

Burnaby North Secondary School is a public secondary school in Burnaby, British Columbia, Canada, with more than 2,000 students, and is part of Burnaby School District 41. Founded in 1922, the school serves students in Grades 8 through 12 and is located at 751 Hammarskjold Drive, adjacent to Kensington Park. The school offers Advanced Placement (AP) and honours courses.

The school offers academic programs alongside extracurricular activities including athletics, music, and student leadership. Its music program includes the Viking Band, which has performed at events such as the Calgary Stampede parade.

== History ==
Burnaby North Secondary School was established in 1922 and is one of the oldest secondary schools in the Burnaby School District.

== Campus ==
The school campus is located at 751 Hammarskjold Drive in Burnaby, British Columbia, and borders Kensington Park. Burnaby North is the largest secondary school in the district by student population and campus area.

== Academics ==
Burnaby North Secondary School offers a comprehensive academic program for students in Grades 8 through 12, including Advanced Placement (AP) and honours courses.

== Extracurricular activities ==
Burnaby North offers a variety of extracurricular activities, including athletics, music, and student leadership.

=== Music ===
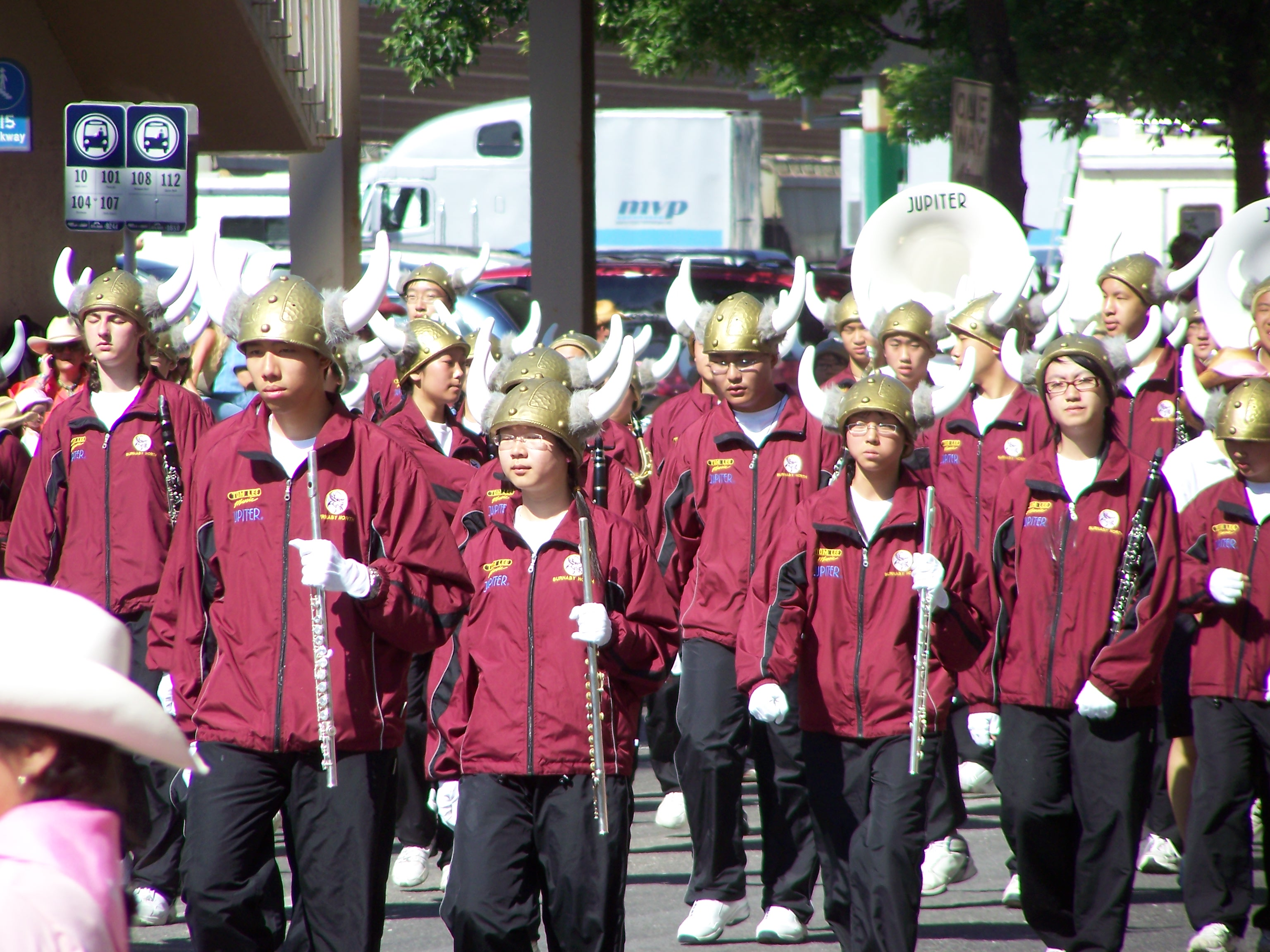
The Burnaby North Secondary School Viking Band marching in the 2007 Calgary Stampede parade

== Alumni ==
- Andrea Bang – actress and writer, known for portraying Janet Kim in Kim's Convenience
- Diana Bang – actress and writer, portrayed Sook-Yin Park in The Interview
- Antonio Cupo – actor, known for portraying Marco Moretti in Bomb Girls
- Joe Keithley – musician and Burnaby city councillor
- Jade Kwan – Hong Kong idol and singer
- Karena Lam – actress and singer; first person to win Best Lead Actress, Best Supporting Actress, and Best New Performer at the Golden Horse Awards
- Don Mattrick – chief executive officer of Prometheus Ventures Inc.
- Jack McIlhargey – former professional hockey player
- Vince Murdocco – actor
- Dave Nonis – senior vice-president of hockey operations and assistant general manager of the Calgary Flames
- Ryan Nugent-Hopkins – professional hockey player for the Edmonton Oilers
- Svend Robinson – former politician
- Cliff Ronning – retired professional hockey player
- Joe Sakic – president of hockey operations for the Colorado Avalanche and inductee of the Hockey Hall of Fame
- Mike Santorelli – retired professional hockey player
- Tamara Taggart – television personality
- Todd Talbot – actor and television personality, known for Love It or List It Vancouver
- Wayne Wong – member of the Canadian Ski Hall of Fame and the U.S. Ski & Snowboard Hall of Fame

== Staff ==
- Barry Seebaran – retired Canadian cricket player
- Manuel Sobral – boxer

== Campus ==
The school campus is located at 751 Hammarskjold Drive in Burnaby, British Columbia, next to Kensington Park.

== Academics ==
Burnaby North offers a comprehensive program of secondary-school courses for students in Grades 8–12.

== Extracurricular activities ==
Burnaby North offers extracurricular programs in athletics, music, and student leadership.

=== Music ===
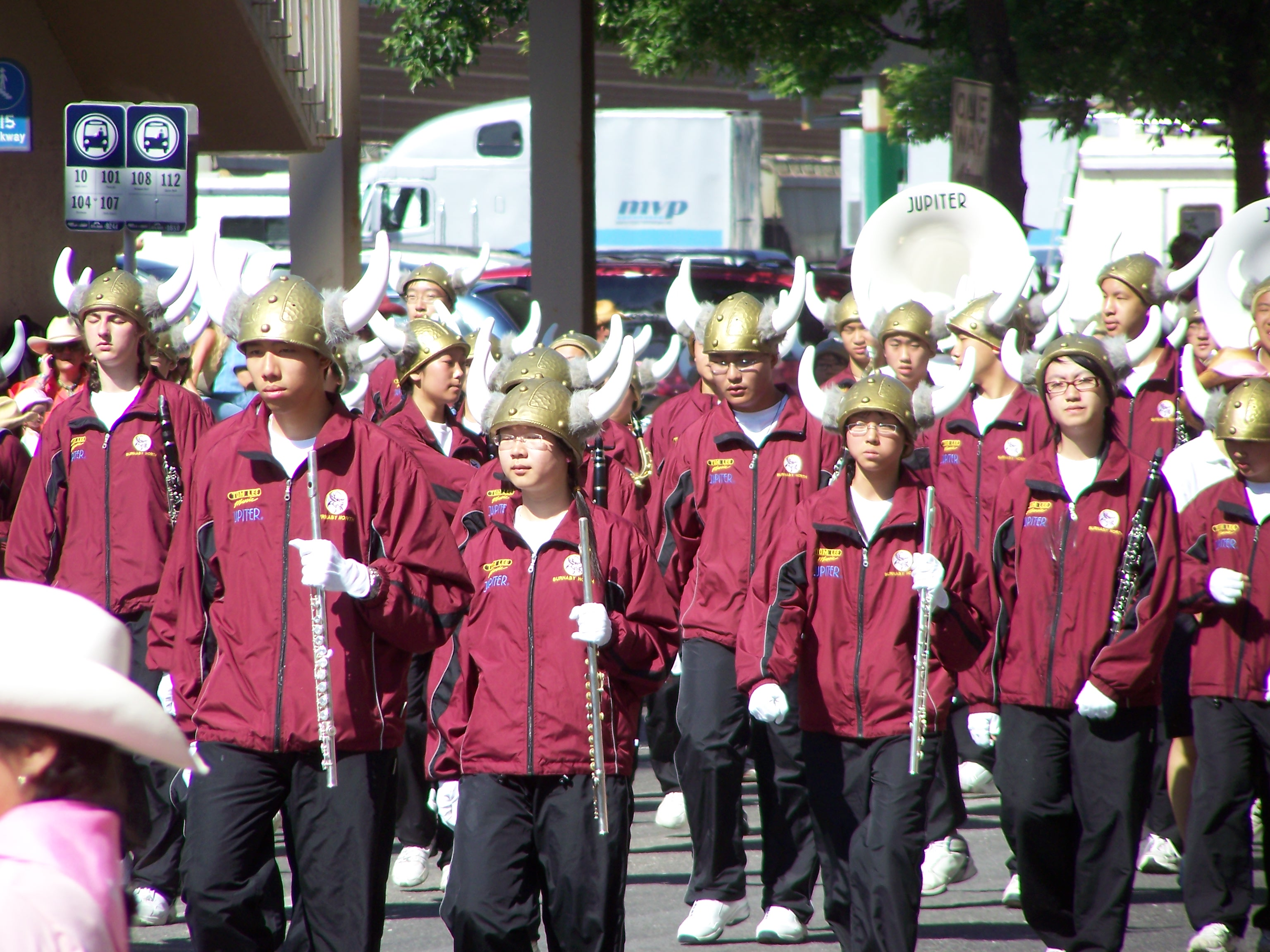
The Burnaby North Secondary School Viking Band marching in the 2007 Calgary Stampede parade

== History ==
Burnaby North was established in 1922 with around 50 students. Before moving to its present site, it was housed on Willingdon Avenue, which later became Burnaby Heights Junior Secondary, when it moved to the Hammarksjold location, which was built by Coyne and Ratcliffe Construction and completed in 1962. In 1982, Kensington Junior Secondary School (Crusaders) and Burnaby North Senior Secondary School (Vikings) were merged as one.

The project to merge Kensington Jr and Burnaby North Sr into Burnaby North Secondary began in the 1981/1982 school year. The objective was to see if money could be saved by sharing the resources and staff between the two schools. The former Kensington was referred as the "South Building" and Burnaby North Sr. was referred to as the "North Building". A wheelchair access elevator was added in 1983 to the North Building's east entrance.

To accommodate the merged schools, two connections were built. A level sheltered walkway was constructed to connect the ground-level south-facing entrance of the North Building to the second floor of the southwestern entrance of the South Building, and a wooden staircase was built on a hill to provide access from the North Building's east entrance to the South Building's ground-level north entrance. The latter was replaced by a sheltered walkway that had a more gradual slope to accommodate accessibility.

In 2010, the school was named Canada's Greenest School.

In 2017, the British Columbia Ministry of Education announced that the school would undergo a program to seismically mitigate and upgrade all buildings (under the British Columbia Ministry of Education Seismic Mitigation Program). On 12 October 2018, the British Columbia Ministry of Education officially announced funding for a complete rebuild of the current campus totaling CA$79.2 million. Construction was slated to be complete for September 2021, to coincide with the 100th anniversary of Burnaby North Secondary School.

In July 2020, construction work began to build a new school campus building with a capacity for 1,800 students and space for child care, adult education, and language development programs. Construction was finished in January 2024.

Notable Events

In 2019, tensions between pro-Hong Kong and pro-China supporters over pro-democracy posters displayed on a school locker led to a heated incident among students at Burnaby North Secondary school. Differing opinions regarding the 2019-20 Hong Kong protests were part of broader tension gripping schools across the province.

== Academics ==
Burnaby North is a highly academic school which enrolls a population of over 2000 students in grades 8 through grade 12. The student body is composed of students from many ethnic backgrounds, although most are of East-Asian descent. The graduating class consists of approximately 450 to 500 students on average, many of whom are offered scholarships to attend well-known universities. Ivy League admission rates are very high in comparison to other Canadian public high schools; Burnaby North alumni have attended institutions such as Harvard University, Yale University, Princeton University and the University of Pennsylvania. In recent years, Burnaby North graduates have won more than a million dollars in scholarship money annually.

In 2010, the eight high schools in the district earned almost $7.3 million in scholarship money. Burnaby North came in second place in the district, earning $1.2 million, $1.16 million of which came externally.

Burnaby North has one of the largest Advanced Placement (AP) programs in Canada. Over 30% of the student body is enrolled in at least one Honours or AP course. In May 2007, 297 students wrote a total of 687 exams in 17 subject areas and a score of 3 or higher was earned on 86% of those exams, and 104 students achieved AP Scholar status, indicating they had scored 3 out of a possible 5 on at least 3 AP exams. This indicates quite early that the program is not only large, but is also of high quality. In 2007, a total of 31 students achieved National AP Scholar status, the highest standing which requires an average score of 4 over five or more exams, surpassing the previous year's record of 18 and setting a national record. In 2008, a total of 97 students became AP Scholars, and 35 students achieved National AP Scholar status, again surpassing the previous year's record and setting a national record. In 2009, there were 86 AP Scholars and 23 National AP Scholars.

In October 2013, Burnaby North announced that it would be offering the Advanced Placement (AP) Capstone Diploma starting in the 2014–15 school year. This is a pilot program that was then offered in only a handful of schools worldwide.

Burnaby North also offers a Career Preparation program where students go out on work experience for between 30 and 90 hours. The goal is to introduce students to the world of work and to enable students to explore a career area that is of interest to them. Burnaby North offers industry training programs (ACE-IT), allowing students to complete first year theory exams and a portion of the on-the-job training requirements of an apprenticeship program.

== Athletics ==
Burnaby North currently offers a Hockey Academy, a Soccer Academy, and a Basketball Academy program. Several NHL players have attended this school, most notably Joe Sakic, Cliff Ronning, Mike Santorelli, and Ryan Nugent-Hopkins.

The school has a competitive volleyball team with several provincial titles and a competitive swimming team with multiple district titles high placings at the provincial level. It also has boys' and girls' soccer teams and a table tennis team, which has won numerous provincial titles.

Burnaby North has a competitive cheerleading team which performs at school events and competitions, including the Sea to Sky International Cheerleading Championships. This competition is the second largest in North America.

== School Band ==
While Burnaby North is considered a highly academic school, its music program is also renowned. In the summer of 2015, the band director, Peter Wenzek, who ran the concert bands, the orchestra, and the marching band, left Burnaby North to teach elementary students. The jazz bands, concert bands, marching band, and orchestra are taught by Alley Steiger.

The school's concert and jazz band programs are the largest in Western Canada, and are often invited to national music festivals, such as the Kiwanis Music Festival. The school's marching band, well known for their maroon uniforms and Viking headwear, are often invited to participate in the Calgary Stampede and other national events. New uniforms for the marching band were introduced in June 2012 during the annual Hats Off Day Parade. The band won gold in the large ensemble and orchestra classes of the 2015 Vancouver Kiwanis Music Festival.

== Viking Head ==
Burnaby North's Viking Head statue was installed in 1994. The enormous black head wearing a two-horned helmet and facing Union Street was built by the school's Technology Education wing's welding staff and students. Traditionally, it is decorated with a Santa hat every Christmas season, and bunny ears during Easter. During the 2010 Winter Olympics in Vancouver, it was covered with a red and white tuque and scarf, the national colours of Canada.

== Filming ==
Burnaby North was used for the public service announcement-style commercial of Metroid Prime 2: Echoes that was shown in North America.

The movie Hot Rod had scenes filmed at the outside stairway location.

Segments of The Third Heaven, a 1998 documentary examining Vancouver's Hong Kong immigrant community, were filmed at the school.

== Notable alumni and staff ==
=== Alumni ===
- Andrea Bang – actress and writer, plays Janet Kim in Kim's Convenience
- Diana Bang – actress and writer, portrayed Sook Yin Park in The Interview
- Antonio Cupo – actor, plays Marco Moretti in Bomb Girls
- Joe Keithley – musician, Burnaby city councillor
- Jade Kwan - Hong Kong idol
- Karena Lam – actress and singer, first person to win all of the following three Golden Horse awards: Best Lead Actress, Best Supporting Actress and Best New Performer
- Don Mattrick – CEO of Prometheus Ventures Inc.
- Jack McIlhargey – former hockey player
- Vince Murdocco – actor
- Dave Nonis – Senior VP of Hockey Operations, Assistant General Manager for the Calgary Flames
- Ryan Nugent-Hopkins – hockey player, plays for the Edmonton Oilers
- Svend Robinson – former politician
- Cliff Ronning – retired hockey player
- Joe Sakic – President of Hockey Operations for the Colorado Avalanche and Hockey Hall of Fame inductee
- Mike Santorelli – retired hockey player
- Tamara Taggart – TV personality
- Todd Talbot - actor and TV personality. Love it or List it Vancouver
- Wayne Wong – member of the Canadian Ski Hall of Fame and U.S. Ski Hall of Fame

=== Staff ===
- Barry Seebaran – retired Canadian cricket player
- Manuel Sobral – boxer
