= Camp Death III in 2D! =

- Directed by: Matt Frame
- Starring: Dave Peniuk; Angela Galanopoulos; Darren Andrichuk; Emma Docker; Chris Allen
- Release date: February 15, 2019
- Running time: 89 minutes
- Country: Canada
- Language: English

Camp Death III in 2D! is a Canadian horror comedy spoof movie, based on the Friday the 13th film series. On February 15, 2019, the film was released digitally via Amazon Prime.

== Plot ==
It’s been three years since Camp Crystal was shut down after the rampage of Johann Van Damme was put to an end by a puppet. With Johann locked up in the asylum, the camp is re-opened as a rehabilitation center for criminals. Camp Crystal is run by a team of unqualified counselors, including the head counselor, Todd, his abusive Uncle keeps getting attacked in the face by a squirrel. Todd’s love interest Rachel a survivor of Johann's previous rampage.

== Cast ==
- Dave Peniuk as Todd Boogjumper
- Angela Galanopoulos as Rachel Diaz
- Darren Andrichuk as Mel Boogjumper
- Emma Docker as Amy Henderson
- Chris Allen as Barry Brown
- Starlise Waschuk as Georgia Somers
- Cynthia Chalmers as Alice Wainwright
- Terry Mullet as Johann Van Damme
- Hans Potter as Shelby Hammersmith
- Katherine Alpen as Verta
- Jason Asuncion as Jesus Hernandez Jr.
- Andrea Bang as Angela Park
- Stephanie Bally as Waffle
- Léonie Armstrong as Rod
- Niall King as AIDS
- Kyle Fines as Officer Bert Gaybert Jr.
- Leslie Schwetz as Crazy Ethel
- Doug Naugler as Jester
- Caroe Sandoval as Mavis Boogjumper
- Allendra Patton as Young Johann
- Nikki Wallin as Becky Boogjumper
- Shawn Bordoff as Crapsey
- Molly Wilson as Claudia Clemp
- Janna MacDonald as Colleen Travis
- Jake Anthony as Arnold

== Production ==
The film was partially financed by a successful crowdfunding campaign in August 2014. Director Matt Frame helped to promote the crowdfunding campaign by partaking in a world record 24-hour, 109 km non-stop walk in which he chained a coconut to his waist. The subsequent media coverage resulted in the film raising 100% of its goal.

== Filming ==
The film was shot over a 14-month period on Gabriola Island and lower mainland Vancouver, British Columbia, Canada.

=== Kill count ===
Camp Death III in 2D! has a number of on-screen deaths. The more than 80 on-screen kills were primarily the result of an open call for Vancouver actors to take part in an event called Night of the Living Deaths, which was held in Vancouver's Gastown in May 2015. Camp Death III: The Final Summer, makeup artist Deb Graf murdered 62 willing victims over the course of 8 hours. In a feature article in the Vancouver Sun Graf was quoted as saying: "We went full bore for almost 8 hours straight. I wasn't sure we could keep up that pace, but somehow we did. I'm proud. Messy, but proud."

== Title ==
Despite its title, Camp Death III in 2D! is not a sequel. Director Matt Frame explained the title by stating, "It's part of the joke. It's a spoof film. There are no parts 1 and 2, at least not yet." Camp Death III in 2D! is unrelated to the short film Camp Death (2006).

== Release ==
The film was released on February 15, 2019 digitally via Amazon Prime.
