= Olaus Jeldness =

Miner and Nordic skier

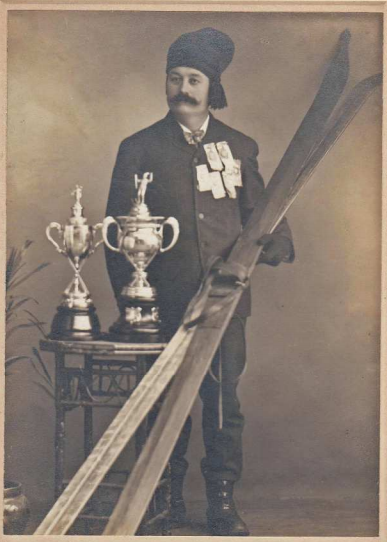
- Olaus Jeldness (1905)

Personal information
- Full name: Olaus Nilsen Jeldness
- Born: Gjeldnes; 1 October 1856 Stangvik, Norway
- Died: 24 April 1935 (aged 78) Spokane, Washington

Sport
- Country: Norwegian–American
- Sport: Skiing

Olaus Nilsen Jeldness (originally Gjeldnes) (1 October 1856 – 24 April 1935) was a Norwegian–American miner, businessman, and skiing pioneer. He has been called the "father of Canadian competitive skiing".

== Mining career ==
Born in Stangvik, Norway in 1856, at 16 years of age in May 1873 Jeldness emigrated to the United States. He joined his brothers as they worked mines in Michigan, Missouri (1874–5), South Dakota (1876) and Colorado (1877–1881). From 1882–83 he worked at a silver mine in Northern Norway. Returning to the United States, he worked silver mines in Northern Idaho (1884, 1890), near Omak, Washington (1886–1887), and Montana (1889–1894). From Spokane, Jeldness came to the town of Rossland in British Columbia, Canada, in November 1894 during a mining boom around Red Mountain. He spent five years in Rossland, involved with several mine developments, acquiring some real estate, and ski racing.

== Skiing career ==
Jeldness later related that in 1873 he ski jumped a distance of 92 feet in Norway, which would have been a world record at the time if properly documented. He and his brother performed a ski jump in a mining camp near Silverton, Colorado in 1879, and the next year the Jeldness brothers issued a nation-wide challenge for a ski race. After arriving in Canada, Jeldness won a down mountain ski race in 1896 and 1897 held on Red Mountain. He was a creator of the annual Rossland Winter Carnival first held in mid-February 1898, with skating, hockey and curling at the Ice Palace ice skating rink and Championship of British Columbia ski races on Red Mountain. Jeldness won both the Championship ski races, and was awarded the War Eagle Trophy for ski jumping, and the MacIntosh Trophy for ski-running (downhill) for three straight years (1898–1900). This was the first Canadian Championship Ski Jumping contest, later renamed the Dominion Ski Championships. He then retired as a competitive skier after his third set of championships, but continued in the sport as a judge of the ski jumping events. Jeldness authored an article on skiing in 1910. In 1913 he organized a ski jumping event in Spokane.

== Later career ==
From 1898–1899 Jeldness was director of the Rossland ice rink, then moved back to Spokane. In 1900 he visited Nome, Alaska for a short time. From 1903–1905 he was a principal in the formation of the Arctic Coal Company in Svalbard, but ended his association and returned to the United States in the summer of 1905.

He was manager or inspector of several mines in Washington, Oregon, Nevada, Idaho and Montana. He was treasurer of the Northwest Mining Association trade group in 1928, if not longer.

== Personal life ==
In 1890 he married Sigrid Hendrickson in Spokane, Washington and they had three daughters. He died in Spokane on 24 April 1935 of double pneumonia.

== Legacy ==
In the early 1900s he twice donated a trophy to replace his War Eagle Trophy. This became the Jeldness Trophy. Mount Jeldness west of Rossland was named after him in 1967. Olaus Jeldness was inducted into the Canadian Ski Hall of Fame in 1988. The Spirit of Red Social Club Society installed a statue of Olaus Jeldness in Rossland for the annual winter carnival of 2013. He is included on a Memorial stone in Norway, honoring Norwegian-American skiing pioneers in the US and Canada.

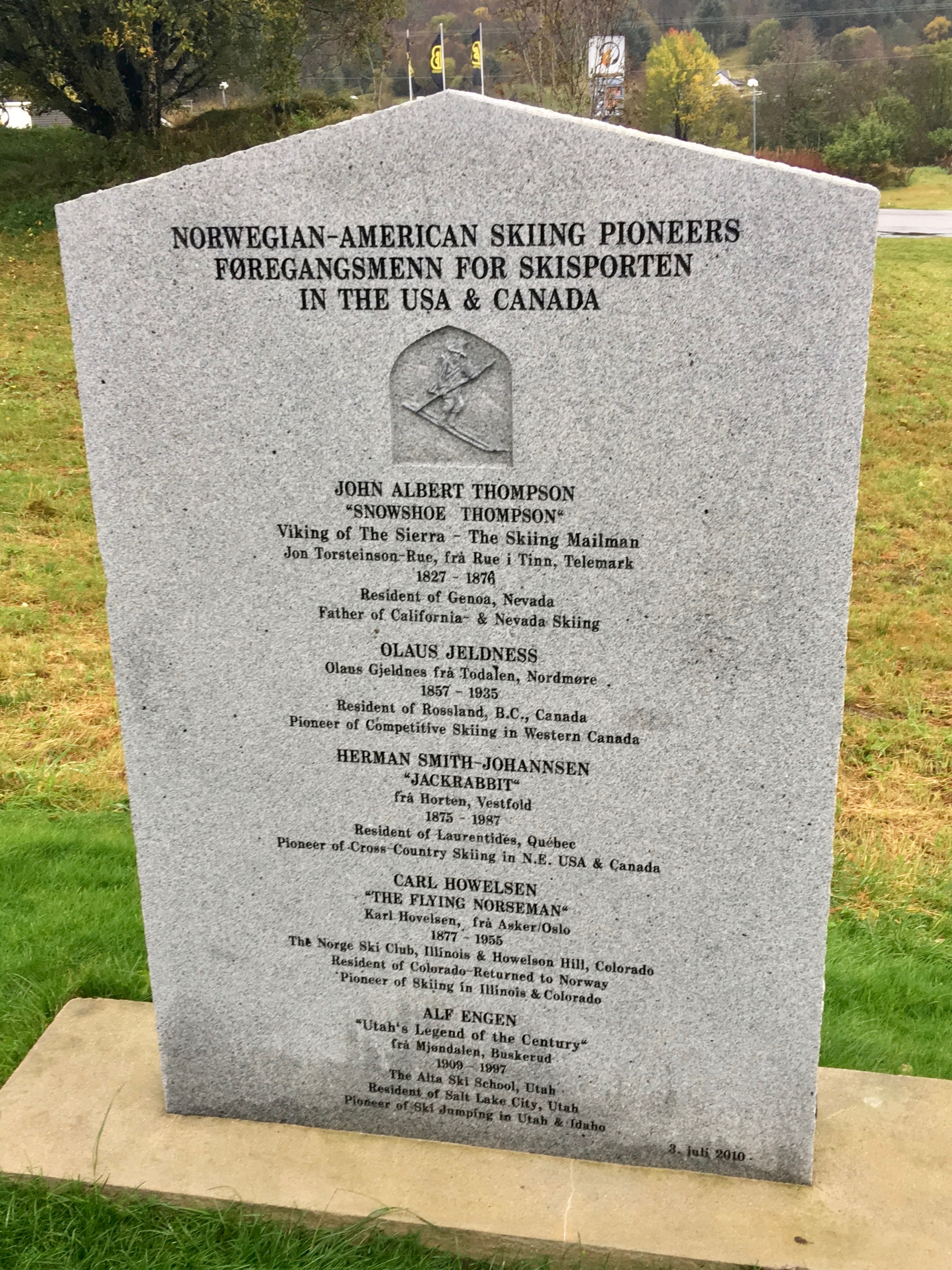
Memorial stone for Norwegian-American skiing pioneers in the USA & Canada at Radøy, Norway

== See also ==
- Torjus Hemmestveit
- Karl Hovelsen
- Ragnar Omtvedt
