= Johnny Fripp =

Canadian rugby player and skier (1921–2022)

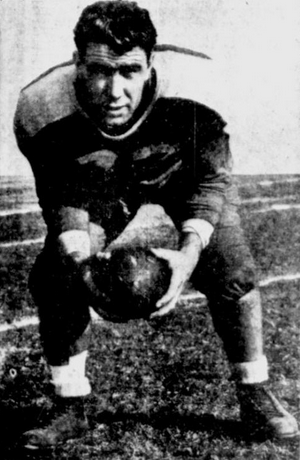
- Fripp in the 1940s

No. 58, 33, 24, 72
- Positions: Halfback, flying wing

Personal information
- Born: February 11, 1921; Ottawa, Ontario, Canada
- Died: March 24, 2022 (aged 101); Ottawa, Ontario, Canada
- Listed height: 5 ft 7 in (1.70 m)
- Listed weight: 185 lb (84 kg)

Career information
- High school: Lisgar (ON); Glebe (ON)
- University: none

Career history
- 1941: Ottawa Rough Riders
- 1943: Lachine Fliers
- 1945: Montreal Hornets
- 1946–1947: Ottawa Rough Riders
- 1947: Ottawa Trojans

John Downing Fripp (February 11, 1921 – March 24, 2022) was a Canadian skier and football player. He was a skier between 1927 and 1960 and played football in the Interprovincial Rugby Football Union (IRFU) (now CFL East Division) and Ontario Rugby Football Union (ORFU) between 1941 and 1947. A centenarian, Fripp was believed to be the oldest former Canadian football player at the time of his death.

== Early life ==
Johnny Fripp was born on February 11, 1921, in Ottawa, Ontario. He attended high school at Lisgar Collegiate Institute, before transferring to Glebe Collegiate. He played football in high school as a halfback, helping Glebe to an undefeated record and interscholastic championship in 1939. The Ottawa Citizen described him as "a bundle of football-toting dynamite" and the "spearhead of a smashing ground attack".

== Skiing career ==
Fripp started skiing at the age of 6, and won multiple tournaments as a youth. In 1938, at the age of 17, he won the Journal Trophy at the Gatineau Ski Zone Championships. However, the trophy was awarded to someone else as he was not old enough to be eligible.

After being denied entry to the Dominion Championships (Note: The Dominion Ski Championships acted as the Canadian national championships.) due to his age, Fripp went to compete against Americans in the Eastern Olympic try-outs held at Lake Placid, New York. He was beaten by national champion Dick Durrance, but won third place in both slalom and downhill events.

Fripp again won the Journal Trophy one year later, and also placed second in the Quebec Kandahar combined race, earning first place honors in downhill. He was champion of the Kandahar race in 1940, and won the Eastern Canadian Championships with first place in both slalom and downhill events.

Later that year in Sun Valley, Idaho, he competed against American and Austrian professionals, placing 16th out of 80 competitors. Also in 1940, he was named an assistant professional ski instructor at Mont Tremblant.

His sports career was interrupted in 1942 by World War II. As a member of the skiing team of the Royal Canadian Air Force, he won an event held at Mount Baldy Ski Area and recorded the fastest time ever by a Canadian skier. After returning from the war, Fripp again won the Quebec Kandahar race. He also won the Alta Cup competition in Alta, Utah.

He retired shortly afterwards, but returned in 1951 and won his third Quebec Kandahar tournament. He won the Canadian Open Class Downhill Championships in 1953, and was Canada's top entrant to the 1954 Ryan Cup.

He was appointed by the Canadian Federation Internationale de Ski (FIS) to be the coach of the men's team in 1958 to compete in Bad Gastein. He also served as director of the Canadian Amateur Ski Association in 1957, and was a member of the International Competition Committee in 1958. He retired in 1960.

== Football career ==
Fripp began to play football for the Ottawa Rough Riders of the Interprovincial Rugby Football Union (IRFU) at 20 years old in 1941. He played the flying wing position. He made his debut on September 27, in a 18–5 win over the Montreal Bulldogs. An article in The Montreal Gazette said, "Johnny Fripp, one of Canada's greatest skiers and last year's one man football team at Glebe Collegiate, was shoved into the battle as a momentary replacement for Andy Tommy in the second quarter." After being put in, he was immediately given the ball on a short end play and "made yards". His rushes were described as "bull-like" by The Montreal Gazette. He made a "fine debut", according to The Ottawa Journal.

Controversy arose after the game, when Montreal Star writer Baz O'Meara claimed he was ineligible to play as an amateur due to his skiing career. James P. McCaffrey, league president, declined to comment on Fripp.

Fripp remained in the league, and scored his first touchdown in a 24–6 win over the Toronto Argonauts on October 25. He was out of the league in 1942 when games were suspended due to World War II. He returned to football the following year, playing on the Lachine Fliers military service team. After then spending another year out of football, Fripp played for the Montreal Hornets of the IRFU in 1945.

He re-joined the Rough Riders in 1946, appearing in eleven games. He returned to the team in 1947, but left early in the season for the Ottawa Trojans of the Ontario Rugby Football Union (ORFU). He played one season with the Trojans as a halfback, appearing in seven games, before ending his professional football career.

== Later life ==
His father, Herbert, founded a real estate and insurance firm in 1923, H. D. Fripp & Son Ltd., and Johnny Fripp took over in 1950.

He was inducted into the Canadian Ski Hall of Fame in 1988, and one year later was an inductee to the Ottawa Sports Hall of Fame. In 2020, he was reported to be the oldest former Ottawa Rough Rider, and believed to be the oldest former Canadian football player at the time. Fripp celebrated his 100th birthday on February 11, 2021. He died on March 24, 2022, one year later at age 101.
