= Manuel Sobral =

Spanish boxer

Manny Sobral
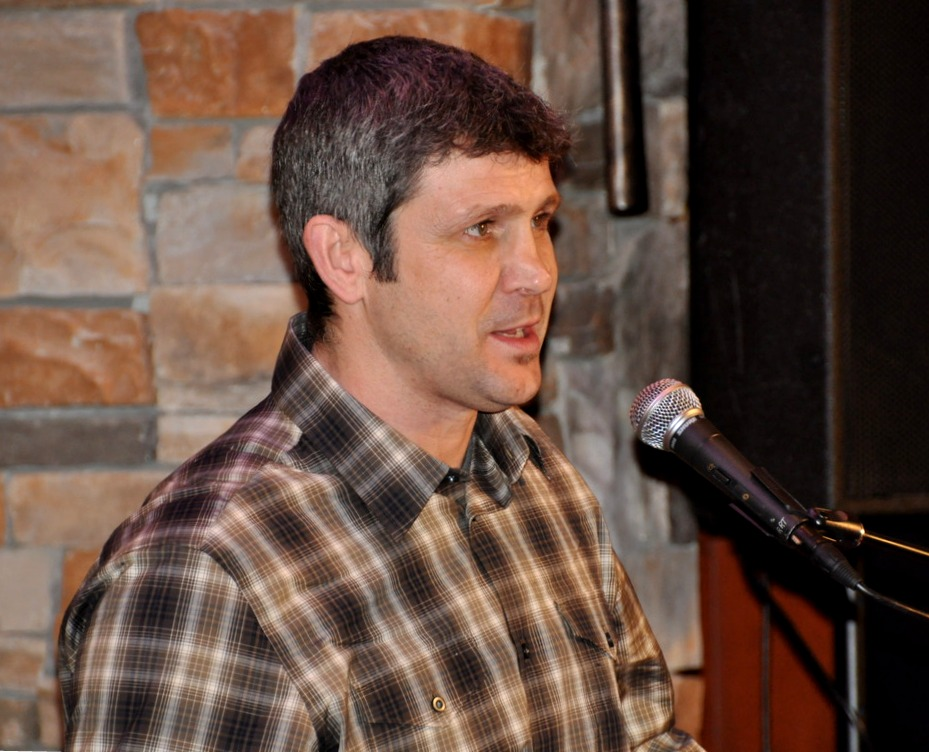

Personal information
- Nationality: Canadian
- Born: 12 September 1968 (age 57) Galicia, Spain
- Weight: Super welterweight

Boxing career
- Stance: Southpaw

Boxing record
- Total fights: 32
- Wins: 29
- Win by KO: 15
- Losses: 2
- No contests: 1

Manuel "Manny" Sobral (born September 12, 1968) is the former Canadian and IBO Champion of the World, competing in the Super welterweight division. A resident of Vancouver, British Columbia, he represented Canada at the 1988 Summer Olympics in Seoul, South Korea, where he was eliminated by Olympic bronze medallist Finland's Joni Nyman on points (1:4).

He has taught at Burnaby North Secondary School.
