= Running with Violet =

Canadian comedy-drama web series

- Genre: Dramedy
- Created by: Rebecca Davey; Marie-Claire Marcotte
- Written by: Rebecca Davey; Marie-Claire Marcotte
- Directed by: Lindsay Mackay; Joyce Wong
- Starring: Rebecca Davey; Marie-Claire Marcotte; Amy Matysio; Andrea Bang; Jessii Vee; Violet Alfred
- Country of origin: Canada
- Original language: English
- No. of seasons: 2
- No. of episodes: 21

Production
- Executive producers: Rebecca Davey; Marie-Claire Marcotte; Trent Scherer; Michael Cheung; Paul Aucoin; Miguel M. Matias; Timshel Pictures
- Producers: Rebecca Davey; Marie-Claire Marcotte; Emma Malm; Lindsay King
- Editors: Alex Brueckner; Simone Smith; Joffrey Saintrapt; Alex Giffard
- Running time: 6-14 minutes

Original release
- Network: YouTube (2017–2019); OUTtv (2020–present); ERT (2020–present)
- Release: February 13, 2017 – May 10, 2020

Running with Violet is a Canadian comedy-drama web series created by and starring Rebecca Davey and Marie-Claire Marcotte. The series premiered on a dedicated YouTube channel on February 13, 2017. As of January 2020, Running with Violet had received over 1.5 million views on YouTube.

In 2020, it was announced that the series will be broadcast on OutTV in the 2020–21 television season.

== Plot ==
In fictional smalltown Pictonville, Ontario, housewife Miranda and single mother Jolene attempt a weekend holiday with Jolene's daughter, toddler Violet, in tow. After a series of unfortunate events, they find themselves on the run from a small-town meth gang and the law, and must navigate a web of dangerous crime to survive.

Season 2 finds the two friends getting caught up in a beauty and wellness pyramid scheme, only to discover it is a front for pushing drugs. With dreams of big money, the women try to make the most of their situation while dealing with the escalating stakes around them.

== Cast and characters ==
=== Main characters ===
- Jolene (played by Rebecca Davey) is fourth generation Pictonville resident. She was born in the small town and can't imagine any different. She started cutting hair right out of high school at her mother's salon. When her mother died she took over the salon and moved her and her daughter to the family farm to take care of her ailing father. Jolene is a single mother to her energetic toddler Violet and works like a dog to make ends meet.
- Miranda (played by Marie-Claire Marcotte) is a meek housewife trapped in an abusive marriage to Blair. She married Blair when she was nineteen to getaway from her controlling religious family, only to find herself shackled to a man even more domineering. Blair's manipulation has undermined her courage. Miranda is uptight about her appearance, having convinced herself that her value lies in her good looks. Her only ‘friend’ in town is Jolene and Miranda's weekly hair salon visits are the highlight of her week.
- Xorge (played by Amy Matysio) is Stella's ruthless younger sister who left Pictonville at a young age to establish her beauty and wellness company Bae Mine, now a major business empire which she remains the queen-pin of. She is currently looking to expand back into her hometown.
- Samantha (played by Andrea Bang) is Xorge's party-loving girlfriend who does most of the work involved in selling the Bae Mine beauty empire. Samantha has developed a bit of a pill-popping problem to mitigate the more stressful parts of her job.
- Violet (played by Violet Alfred) is a charming three-year-old. Her and her mom, Jolene, are inseparable and custody weekends with dad Nick are hard on them both. Jolene desperately wants a different life for her daughter where she will not be bound by the limits of a narrow town.
- Frankie (played by Jessii Vee) is a local teenager who babysits for Jolene. She's super attached to Violet, having been her baby-sitter since day one. Her relationship with her mom is currently fraught not because of the decision she made to put down the family cat (who was also her best friend) without telling her.

=== Supporting characters ===
- Blair (played by Jamie Spilchuk) is the town good boy and businessman who has a dark side that not even his wife Miranda sees. He is deeply involved Pictonville's meth ring, hiding meth in his basement and car.
- Stella (played by Claire Armstrong) owns a diner just outside of town. She likes the constant flow of customers and regularly takes in stragglers passing through town. She was born into the meth ring and, being the daughter of its kingpin Daddy, remains stuck in it. She's still reeling from her twelve-year-old son's disappearance, holding out hope that he's still alive.
- Gary (played by John Boylan) is Jolene's emotionally needy father. He's not that sick, but regularly pretends to have new ailment. He has become romantically involved with Daddy, though he remains completely unaware of her involvement in the town meth ring.
- Daddy (played by Maria Vacratsis) is Stella's mother and ever since anyone can remember, has always gone by the name of Daddy. Daddy is ruthless and emotionally stunted. She wanted her grandson to participate in the meth ring, seeing great leadership potential in him. She tries to keep her grandson's tragic ending a secret from Stella.
- Nick (played by John Cleland) is Jolene's ex and the police officer in town. He's on a mission to bring down the town meth ring. He loves his daughter, though has not fought Jolene on getting full custody, hoping that his congeniality might make Jolene relent and come back to him. While waiting for Jolene to ‘come around’, he's gotten romantically involved with Frankie's mom.
- Stewart (played by Shannon Kook) is an undercover cop. He works partnered with Rosa, and is the lazy one of the two. Preferring to eat donuts, he tends to sit back and only get his butt moving if it's a direct order.
- Rosa (played by Debora Demestre) is a hardworking undercover cop. She's attracted to Miranda and though her job always comes first, Miranda tests her ability to flirt and work at the same time.
- Astrid (played by Katherine Gauthier) and Grete (played by Jonelle Gunderson) are two peppy Norwegians charged with investigating and reporting back on Pictonville's Green Soil Project. Astrid has a PhD in biochemistry and Greta is her graduate student. They are the ying to each other's yang having spent so many hours in the lab together.
- Ranger (played by Peyson Rock) and Deedee (played by Sabryn Rock) are a pair of twin drug dealers who buy meth from Daddy. They are careful to make sure Daddy is kept happy at all times.
- Teddy (played by Kevan Kase) is a member of another gang in Pictonville which ‘owns’ the highway. They're not as big as Daddy's gang but desperately try to be.
- Sue-Anne (played by Rachelle Casseus)
- Sister Diane (played by Djennie Laguerre)
- Wanda (played by Diana Durango)
- Anna (played by Rakhee Morzaria)
- Simone (played by Camille Stopps)
- Bev (played by Getenesh Berhe)
- Gigi (played by Sarah Nat Afful)
- Janet (played by Precious Chong)
- Missy (played by Patricia Marceau)
- Carmen (played by Anita La Selva)
- Janet (played by Lara Mrkoci)
- Bernadette (played by Kyra Harper)
- Bob (played by Alex Weiner)
- Martha (played by Sera-Lys McArthur)
- Eddy (played by Neil Whitely)
- Pierre (played by Jameson Kraemer)
- Carl (played by Hamed Dar)

== Episodes ==
=== Season 1 (2017) ===
No. overall	No. in season	Title	Original release date	Length
1	1	"The Hit"	February 13, 2017	8:41
Struggling hairdresser and single mother Jolene tries to convince lonely housewife Miranda to go with her on a girls weekend… with diapers. When Miranda finds herself in a violent confrontation with her slimy husband Blair, the girls weekend and possibility of escape suddenly seems like the very best plan.
2	2	"You Told Me to Do It"	February 13, 2017	9:08
The weekend goes quickly awry when Miranda confesses about what's in the trunk of the car. The women stop at a roadside diner to regroup where they meet the mysterious waitress Stella. She seems to be expecting them and passes them an address to a motel.
3	3	"Candy Powder"	February 13, 2017	7:17
Back in the car Jolene angrily drives them down a wrong short cut. Checking in with Violet she notices some dangerous looking packages on the floor of Miranda's car. A curious pair of Norwegians who claim to be doing soil testing in Pictonville pass by just at that moment.
4	4	"Always Ask to See a Badge"	February 13, 2017	6:36
After another pee break for toddler Violet, the women get back on the road, this time with teenager Frankie along for the ride. When a shady cop pulls them over, things take a very dark turn changing the course of the girls weekend once again.
5	5	"Stella's Order"	February 20, 2017	7:43
Jolene and Miranda set to work digging a hole for the dead "cop." Frankie suddenly makes the link that Stella thinks they're drug dealers. Stella shows up and orders them to the drug drop off spot.
6	6	"The Ivy Motel"	February 20, 2017	7:45
The women arrive at the drug drop off spot where they intend to do the ‘deal’ and make some mad cash, all while keeping Violet safe. Unbeknownst to them there are cops surveying the room and tracking their every move.
7	7	"The Potato is Fried"	February 20, 2017	6:51
Miranda's husband Blair suddenly reappears, forcing another violent confrontation. Quirky cop Stewart pushes Jolene and Frankie aside as he searches their motel room for drugs.
8	8	"The Sting"	February 27, 2017	9:47
Now wearing the cop wires, Jolene, Miranda and Frankie wait anxiously for the drug dealers to show up.
9	9	"Pleasure Doing Business with You"	February 27, 2017	7:12
Having dealt with a mess of her own, Stella shows up at the motel in a disturbed state, surprising the women and drug dealers Deedee and Ranger.
10	10	"Kiss and Ride"	February 27, 2017	8:41
A showdown between all parties leads to a casualty and the end of the sting operation. Miranda and Jolene decide to embark on a real girls weekend in Florida.

=== Season 2 (2019–2020) ===
No. overall	No. in season	Title	Original release date	Length
11	1	"The Bizz"	July 15, 2019	13:11
On their girls’ weekend in Florida, Miranda and Jolene have a chance meeting with party girl Samantha, who introduces them to queenpin Xorge and her beauty/wellness empire Bae Mine Beauty. Fast forward to one year later in small town Pictonville: the women are running the Bae Mine Beauty Pictonville branch, Nick and Jolene are back together raising Violet, and Miranda and Rosa’s newfound relationship is showing some growing pains under the roof of Rosa’s uber-religious mother.
12	2	"Sleepy Town"	July 15, 2019	12:14
Miranda and Jolene start to question the Bae Mine Beauty products they’ve been selling when courier Bob's nosiness raises a red flag. Fledgling psychic Frankie joins a hospital reading program only to find herself reading to ex-criminal Stella, who is still in a coma after a year.
13	3	"The Top Up"	July 15, 2019	13:52
Stella wakes up from her coma and word spreads through the Pictonville community. Xorge hears the news in Florida and prepares with Samantha for a trip up to the small town. Jolene and Miranda's new Bae Mine Beauty pills ("relaxants") prove to be wildly popular, but when one of their customers dies, the two are forced to come to terms with what they’re really selling.
14	4	"Evidence is Evidence"	March 22, 2020	11:20
Jolene and Miranda debate the ethics of what they’re doing. Xorge pays her sister—the newly awakened Stella—a visit and asks about a long-lost ring. Cop duo Nick and Rosa start investigating the town's recent overdose, all the while juggling the disappearance of courier Bob.
15	5	"Angry Gals"	March 29, 2020	12:11
When Miranda ruins their current supply of "relaxants", the women manufacture a crafty solution by making fake glue pills. Nick and Rosa press the ex-criminal Kruikshanks on the not-so-nice stuff that's been happening in town. Xorge pieces together Jolene and Miranda's deceptions and decides to send them a forceful message.
16	6	"Role Play"	April 5, 2020	12:37
Miranda prepares to pay back the debts owed to Xorge with the fortune she has been storing away, creating friction between her and Jolene. Health inspector Carl shows up at Jolene's salon at an inopportune moment and discovers some incriminating evidence. Miranda stays behind to keep an eye on their captive, while Jolene has to force the smiles at Violet's fifth birthday party.
17	7	"Make a Wish"	April 12, 2020	12:14
With Violet's birthday party in full swing, Xorge shows up to collect her debt. After spending some time together, Miranda opens up to the kidnapped Carl. Xorge gets way too cozy with Violet, pushing Jolene over the edge. Miranda lets her guard down and Carl takes the opportunity to escape.
18	8	"Bae Beauty Bitch"	April 19, 2020	12:25
Jolene and Miranda frantically try to get rid of the body as Carl talks with the police. They make a pit stop at the hospital to capitalize on Frankie's newfound psychic abilities. From her hospital bed, Stella advises them to dig up a ring at the Pictonville cemetery. A suspicious Nick shows up at the cemetery and confronts his wife and her friend.
19	9	"Daddy's Calling"	April 26, 2020	14:44
Nick is forced to decide between family duty and cop duty. Back at her house, Xorge surprises Jolene and Miranda, leading to a violent altercation where Xorge is knocked out. Rosa is confronted by her mom about her relationship with Miranda. Carl waits for somebody at the police station to take his story seriously.
20	10	"Mouth Full of Glue"	May 3, 2020	11:10
While interrogating Carl, Rosa finally pieces together what Miranda's been up to. Jolene and Miranda crash a Bae Mine Beauty sales party to reveal the truth about the substances they’ve been peddling. Nick retrieves Stella from the hospital and brings her to the sales party, where she has a standoff with erratic party crasher Xorge.
21	11	"Call Me Clara"	May 10, 2020	11:53
Stella offers a deal to release the women from their business commitments with Xorge. After Nick shows up, the standoff is resolved and the women make frantic plans to leave behind their old lives.

== Production ==
The series was funded through the Independent Production Fund, the Ontario Media Development Corporation Interactive Digital Media Fund, and the St. Petersburg Clearwater Film Commission. After initial production, the series received additional funding through a 2016 Indiegogo crowdfunding campaign that raised over $12,600 CAD.

The first season of Running With Violet was screened at Sunscreen Film Festival, Sunscreen Film Festival West, Austin Web Fest, Toronto Web Fest, Wendie Webfest Hamburg, Melbourne WebFest, SeriesFest, Newark International Film Festival, Lift-Off Global Network (Los Angeles, Paris, Vancouver, and Sydney), Web Series Festival Global, Webfest Berlin, UK Web Fest, Rio WebFest, Open World Toronto Film Festival, Blackbird Film Festival, Marseille Web Fest, and Canada Independent Film Festival.

The second season of Running with Violet was completed in 2019. The first three episodes of the season were released on YouTube before the series received network sales to OUTtv and ERT. The second season was screened at Bilbao Seriesland, Los Angeles Film Awards, Minnesota WebFest, NZ Web Fest, Open World Toronto Film Festival, Queen Palm International Film Festival, Rio Webfest, Sunscreen Film Fest West, Baltimore Next Media Web Fest, Santa Monica Webfest, Seattle Transmedia & Independent Film Festival, UK Web Fest, Web Series Festival Global, and Webfest Berlin.

== Reception ==
Katheryn Trammell of Starry Constellation Magazine described the first season of Running With Violet as "one of a few new shows that represent the future of web series production... to put it more simply this web series looks, acts and feels like a movie, but it does so organically," while also praising its writing for "a tone of comedy I haven't seen this well-executed since the last time I watched Fargo." Matt Fagerholm of rogerebert.com called the show "highly enjoyable", while Joël Bassaget of Web Series Mag wrote "[i]t's a really entertaining show with a perfect rhythm, a clever script and very good acting."

She Does the City described season 2 as something that "will likely remind some viewers of Fargo, Weeds, or Breaking Bad" but "is its own beautiful masterpiece." Siân Melton of Muff Society praised the second season, calling it "just as captivating and intense as the first, but the stakes are even higher." Hollywood North Mag called it "a blend of extremely dark comedy where it either comes off as very funny or very disturbing, which makes it all that more interesting and gripping to watch." Blogger Nerdy Girl Express praised it as "one of the most unexpected series I have ever had the pleasure of watching", and Parker & The Picture Shows called it "one of those rare little gems."

=== Awards and nominations ===
Season 1
Year	Festival	Award Category	Result
2017	Sunscreen Film Festival	Best Web Series	Won
2017	International Academy of Web Television	Best Drama Series	Nominated
2017	International Academy of Web Television	Best Writing (Drama)	Nominated
2017	International Academy of Web Television	Best Cinematography	Nominated
2017	Web Series International Trophy	Best Drama	Won
2017	Web Series International Trophy	Best Production	Won
2017	Web Series International Trophy	Best Director	Won
2017	Web Series International Trophy	Best Cinematography	Won
2017	Wendie Webfest Hamburg	Best Cliffhanger	Won
2017	Melbourne WebFest	Best International Drama	Nominated
2017	Melbourne WebFest	Best Supporting Actor (for Claire Armstrong)	Nominated
2017	Melbourne WebFest	Best Screenplay	Nominated
2017	Webfest Berlin	Special Mention	Won
2017	Rio WebFest	Best Ensemble Cast (Action)	Nominated
2017	Open World Toronto Film Festival	Best Web Series	Nominated
2017	Canada Independent Film Festival	Best Canadian TV & Web Series	Won
2017	Indie Series Awards	Best Writing (Drama)	Nominated

Season 2
Year	Festival	Award Category	Result
2019	Bilbao Seriesland	Best Action/Thriller	Nominated
2019	Bilbao Seriesland	Best Lead Actress (for Rebecca Davey)	Nominated
2019	Bilbao Seriesland	Best Supporting Actress (for Andrea Bang)	Nominated
2019	Bilbao Seriesland	Best Writing	Nominated
2019	Los Angeles Film Awards	Honorable Mention: Comedy	Won
2019	Los Angeles Film Awards	Honorable Mention: Web Series	Won
2019	Minnesota WebFest	Best Dramatic Ensemble	Won
2019	Minnesota WebFest	Best Dramedy	Nominated
2019	NZ Web Fest	Best Actress (for Rebecca Davey & Marie-Claire Marcotte)	Nominated
2019	Queen Palm International Film Festival	Best Actress (for Andrea Bang)	Won (Bronze)
2019	Queen Palm International Film Festival	Best Actress (for Marie-Claire Marcotte)	Won (Honorable Mention)
2019	Queen Palm International Film Festival	Best Actress (for Rebecca Davey)	Won (Honorable Mention)
2019	Queen Palm International Film Festival	Best Cinematography	Won (Gold)
2019	Queen Palm International Film Festival	Best Director	Won (Bronze)
2019	Queen Palm International Film Festival	Best Editor	Won (Bronze)
2019	Queen Palm International Film Festival	Best Producer	Nominated
2019	Queen Palm International Film Festival	Best Web/TV Pilot	Won (Bronze)
2019	Rio Webfest	Best Directing (Drama)	Nominated
2019	Rio Webfest	Best Ensemble (Drama)	Nominated
2020	Canadian Screen Awards	Best Lead Performance, Web Program or Series (for Amy Matysio)	Nominated
2020	Canadian Screen Awards	Best Supporting Performance, Web Program or Series (for Andrea Bang)	Nominated
2020	Santa Monica Webfest	Best Drama Series	Nominated
