= Andrea Bang =

Canadian actress (born 1989)

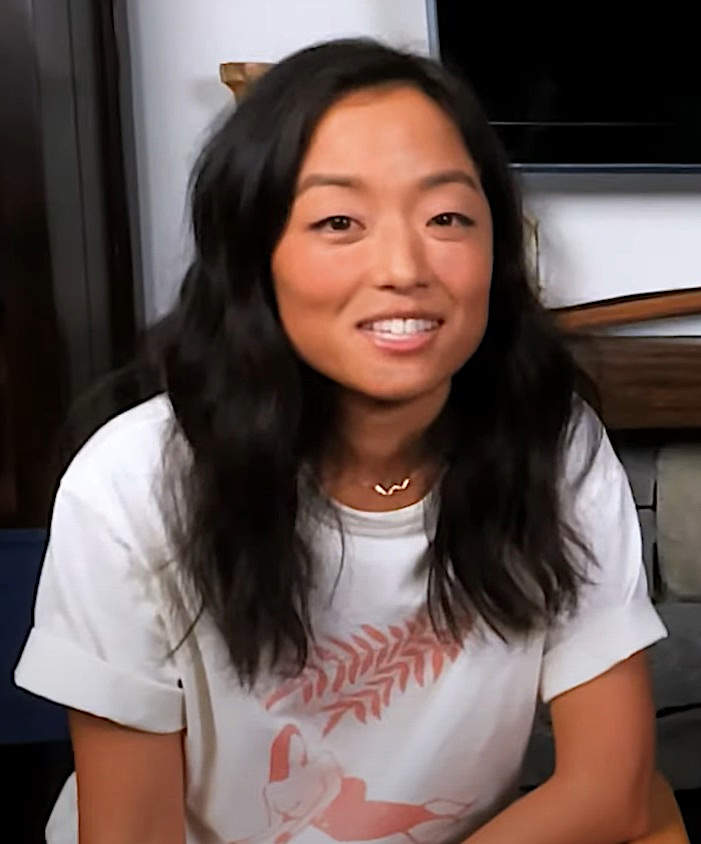
- Bang in 2024
- Born: 2 May 1989 (age 37); Burnaby, British Columbia, Canada
- Education: University of British Columbia
- Occupations: actress; writer
- Years active: 2011–present
- Relatives: Diana Bang (sister)
- Website: www.andreabang.com

Andrea Bang (born 2 May 1989) is a Canadian actress and screenwriter from Burnaby, British Columbia. She is best known for playing Janet Kim in the CBC comedy Kim's Convenience, for which she was nominated three times at the Canadian Screen Awards. She has appeared in A Million Little Things, Fresh, and Running with Violet.

== Early life and education ==
Bang was born in Burnaby, British Columbia to Korean immigrant parents. Her sister, Diana Bang, is also an actress and writer. Bang attended Burnaby North Secondary School and was in the chorus in a school production of Bye Bye Birdie.

Bang graduated in 2012 with a degree in psychology from University of British Columbia, while also taking acting lessons. In 2017, she told the Vancouver Sun:

For the longest time, I kept my interest in acting a secret. Minus a select few, no one really knew. I played around with so many different non-acting career paths. Finally, one day I said 'screw it.' I got an agent and a job that allowed me to audition—and the rest is history.

Bang's parents, who had immigrated from Korea, initially found it "distressing" that Andrea and her sister, Diana Bang, had chosen to pursue acting as a career, but have since become fully supportive.

== Career ==
In 2015, Bang (Summer Award) at the Asians on Film Festival for her debut movie performance as Francesca in the short film Playdate. In 2016, she landed the main role of Janet Kim in the CBC comedy Kim's Convenience alongside Paul Sun-Hyung Lee, Jean Yoon, Simu Liu and Andrew Phung.

In 2020, Bang received a nomination at the Canadian Screen Awards for Best Supporting Performance in a Web Program or Series for her role as Samantha in Running with Violet.

== Filmography ==
Year	Title	Role	Note
2015	Playdate	Fran (Francesca)	Short film
2016–2021	Kim's Convenience	Janet Kim	Main cast
2016	Networking with James	Erica	Short film
2016	Sunnyhearts Community Centre	Lucille	Web series
2016	Bon Bon Fire	Sinclaire Suzuki	Short film
2016	Convos with my 2-Year-Old	Girl Guide #2	Web series
2017	Android Employed	May	Web series
2017	The Prodigal Dad	Teresa	
2017	Lucy Dies	Lucy	Short film
2017	Adventures in Public School	Autumn	
2018	Even the Devil Swiped Right	Jen	Short film
2018	Camp Death III in 2D!	Angela Park	
2018	The Date	Girl on Date	Short film
2018	Karaoke Mamas		Short film, director
2019	Luce	Stephanie Kim	
2019	Hudson and Rex	Gwen "Sixie" Chiu	Rex Machine, S2, Ep11
2019	Running with Violet	Samantha	Web series
2021–2023	A Million Little Things	Claudia	13 episodes
2021	A Small Fortune	Susan Crowe	
2022	Fresh	Penny	
2022	Stay the Night	Grace	
2023	Dear David	Evelyn	
2023	Float	Waverly	
2025	The Chinatown Diner	Mula	
2026	In the Blink of an Eye	V	

== Writing ==
Year	Title	Notes
2011	Schnitzel or Spaetzle	Short film
2015	Playdate	Short film
2017	Lucy Dies	Short film
2018	Karaoke Mamas	Short film
2019	Idols Never Die	Short film
2019	In Loving Memory	Short film

== Awards and nominations ==
Year	Award	Category	Work	Result	Ref
2015	Asians on Film Festival	Best Actress (Summer Award)	Playdate	Won	
2017	Leo Awards	Best Performance in a Music, Comedy or Variety Program or Series	Kim's Convenience	Nominated	
2018	Leo Awards	Best Performance in a Music, Comedy or Variety Program or Series	Kim's Convenience	Won	
2019	Leo Awards	Best Performance in a Music, Comedy or Variety Program or Series	Kim's Convenience	Nominated	
2020	Leo Awards	Best Performance in a Music, Comedy or Variety Program or Series	Kim's Convenience	Won	
2020	Leo Awards	Best Screenwriting in a Short Drama (Shared with: Jerome Yoo)	Idols Never Die	Nominated	
2021	Leo Awards	Best Performance in a Music, Comedy or Variety Program or Series	Kim's Convenience	Nominated	
2022	Leo Awards	Best Performance in a Music, Comedy or Variety Program or Series	Kim's Convenience	Won	
2017	Canadian Screen Awards	Best Actress in a Continuing Leading Comedic Role	Kim's Convenience	Nominated	
2018	Canadian Screen Awards	Best Lead Actress in a Comedy	Kim's Convenience	Nominated	
2020	Canadian Screen Awards	Best Supporting Performance, Web Program or Series	Running with Violet	Nominated	
2022	Canadian Screen Awards	Best Lead Actress in a Comedy	Kim's Convenience	Nominated	
