= Diana Bang =

Canadian actress (born 1981)

- Born: July 3, 1981 (age 45); Vancouver, British Columbia, Canada
- Education: Burnaby North Secondary School
- Occupations: Actress, writer
- Years active: 2008–present
- Relatives: Andrea Bang (sister)

Diana Bang (born July 3, 1981) is a Canadian actress and writer. She played Park Sook-yin in the 2014 film The Interview. She has had regular roles on television in Away, The Astronauts (both 2020), Y: The Last Man (2021), Resident Alien (2021), and Alert: Missing Persons Unit (2023).

== Life and career ==
Bang attended Burnaby North Secondary School, in British Columbia, Canada. Bang's sister, Andrea, is also an actress and writer. Their parents were Korean immigrants to Canada, and initially found it "distressing" that their girls had chosen to pursue acting for their careers, but have since been fully supportive.

Bang started her career in the Vancouver sketch comedy group Assaulted Fish before becoming an actress. In 2014, Bang played Sook-yin Park, a North Korean chief propagandist in The Interview.

Bang starred as Dr. Allison Mann in the FX on Hulu series Y: The Last Man, which premiered in 2021.

== Selected filmography ==
=== Film ===
Year	Title	Role
2008	Ripples (short film)	Harriet
2009	Dandy Lions (short film)	Kate
2009	Misplaced (short film)	Kate
2010	Miracle in Manhattan	Barrista
2012	Lost Lagoon	Mi-Ran Park
2012	The Music Teacher	Teller
2012	Panmunjom (short film)	Yeong - Ae
2013	RocketShip Misfits (short film)	Ida Suki
2013	That Burning Feeling	Alicia
2014	The Interview	Park Sook-yin
2014	PLAN b	Julie
2015	The Cleanse	Laurie
2015	The Tree Inside	Jennifer Rhoo
2015	School of Fish	Heidi
2015	The Price is Precise (short film)	Diana
2017	Entanglement	Tabby Song
2019	The Lady Show: Twins (video short)	-
2019	The Lady Show: Spooky Stories (video short)	-
2019	Squeak!! (short film)	Cherry
2020	Coffee & Kareem	Ms. Chu
2022	A.T.A.C.K (short film)	Cherry

=== Television ===
Year	Title	Role	Note
2008	Aliens in America	Student	1 Episode
2009	Alice	Lab Tech #1	2 Episodes
2009	The Troop	Keiko	Episode "Lost in Translation"
2009	Dandy Lions	Betty	Television film
2009	Sorority Wars	Lauren	Television film
2010	Fringe	Nora	2 Episodes, 1 uncredited
2011	The Killing	Valerie Takeda	Episode "I'll Let you Know When I get There"
2011	The Edge of the Garden	Mia	Television film
2012	Continuum	Docent	Episode "Matter of Time"
2012	Abducted: The Carlina White Story	Ann's Nurse	Television film
2012	Kiss at Pine Lake	Jill	Television
2013	Guess Who's Coming to Christmas	Market Cashier	Television film
2013	No Clue	Coffee Shop Server	Television film
2013	Tom, Dick and Harriet	AJ	Television film
2014	Rush	Mistress Kang	Episode "You Spin Me Around"
2014	Bates Motel	Jiao	4 Episodes
2014	Eve of Destruction	Control Room Scientist	TV Miniseries
2014	Recipe for Love	Celebrity Judge #3	Television film
2015	Paranormal Solutions INC	Olivia	8 Episodes
2016	Second Chance	Emma	4 Episodes
2017	Lucifer	Suki Price	Episode "Stewardess Interruptus" 2x11
2019	You Me Her	Dr. Maria Bhang	2 Episodes
2019	Michelle's	Linda	3 Episodes
2019	Unspeakable	Ruby Kim	4 Episodes
2019	Fast Layne	Dr. Jessica Kwon	Recurring role
2020	The Astronauts	Molly Wei	9 Episodes
2020	Away	Freddie	5 Episodes
2020	The Baby-Sitters Club	Kimiko Kishi	2 Episodes
2020	The Order	Salvador Grant	7 Episodes
2021	Y: The Last Man	Dr. Allison Mann	6 Episodes
2021–2025	Resident Alien	Nurse Ellen	26 Episodes
2023	The Flash	Lady Chronos	Episode: "Partners in Time"

== Awards and nominations ==
Year	Award	Category	Work	Result	Ref
2018	Leo Awards	Best Lead Performance by a Female in a Motion Picture	Entanglement	Nominated	
