= Entanglement (film) =

- Theatrical release poster
- Directed by: Jason James
- Written by: Jason Filiatrault
- Produced by: Jason James; Amber Ripley
- Starring: Thomas Middleditch; Jess Weixler; Diana Bang; Randal Edwards
- Cinematography: James Liston
- Edited by: Jamie Alain; Gareth C. Scales; Christopher Watson
- Music by: Andrew Harris
- Production company: Goodbye Productions
- Distributed by: Dark Star Pictures
- Release dates: May 19, 2017 (SIFF); February 9, 2018 (Canada)
- Running time: 85 minutes
- Country: Canada
- Language: English

Entanglement is a 2017 Canadian romantic comedy-drama film directed by Jason James and written by Jason Filiatrault. It stars Thomas Middleditch, Jess Weixler, Diana Bang, and Randal Edwards, and follows Ben (Middleditch) who forms a romance with Hanna (Weixler) after discovering through various means that they could have almost ended up siblings. This is the first feature film produced through Dark Star Pictures and premiered at the Seattle International Film Festival on March 19, 2017, before being theatrically released on February 2, 2018.

== Synopsis ==
Ben Layten, a recent divorcee, leads a miserable, jobless life. After several suicide attempts, he ends up befriending his sarcastic, yet helpful neighbor Tabby Song. While constructing how his life fell apart through quantum entanglement, Ben learns that he almost had an adoptive sister. Feeling that this is the key to his happiness he sets out to find her only to learn that it is a woman he met earlier named Hanna Weathers. Through constant visitations with her, Ben falls in love with her and learns that life and love are far more complicated than he thought.

== Cast ==
- Thomas Middleditch as Ben Layten
- Jess Weixler as Hanna Weathers
- Diana Bang as Tabby Song
- Randal Edwards as Joel
- Johannah Newmarch as Dr. Jill Franklyn
- Nicole LaPlaca as Chloe
- Marilyn Norry as Betty Layten

== Reception ==
On review aggregator website Rotten Tomatoes, the film holds an approval rating of 61% based on 33 reviews, and an average rating of 5.9/10. The website's critical consensus reads, "Entanglement proves there's still room for charmingly quirky romantic comedies -- even if it flirts with a number of ingredients that typically lead to cutesy disaster." On Metacritic, the film has a weighted average score of 54 out of 100, based on 13 critics, indicating "mixed or average reviews".
