= Kensington Park (Burnaby) =

Park in Burnaby, British Columbia, Canada

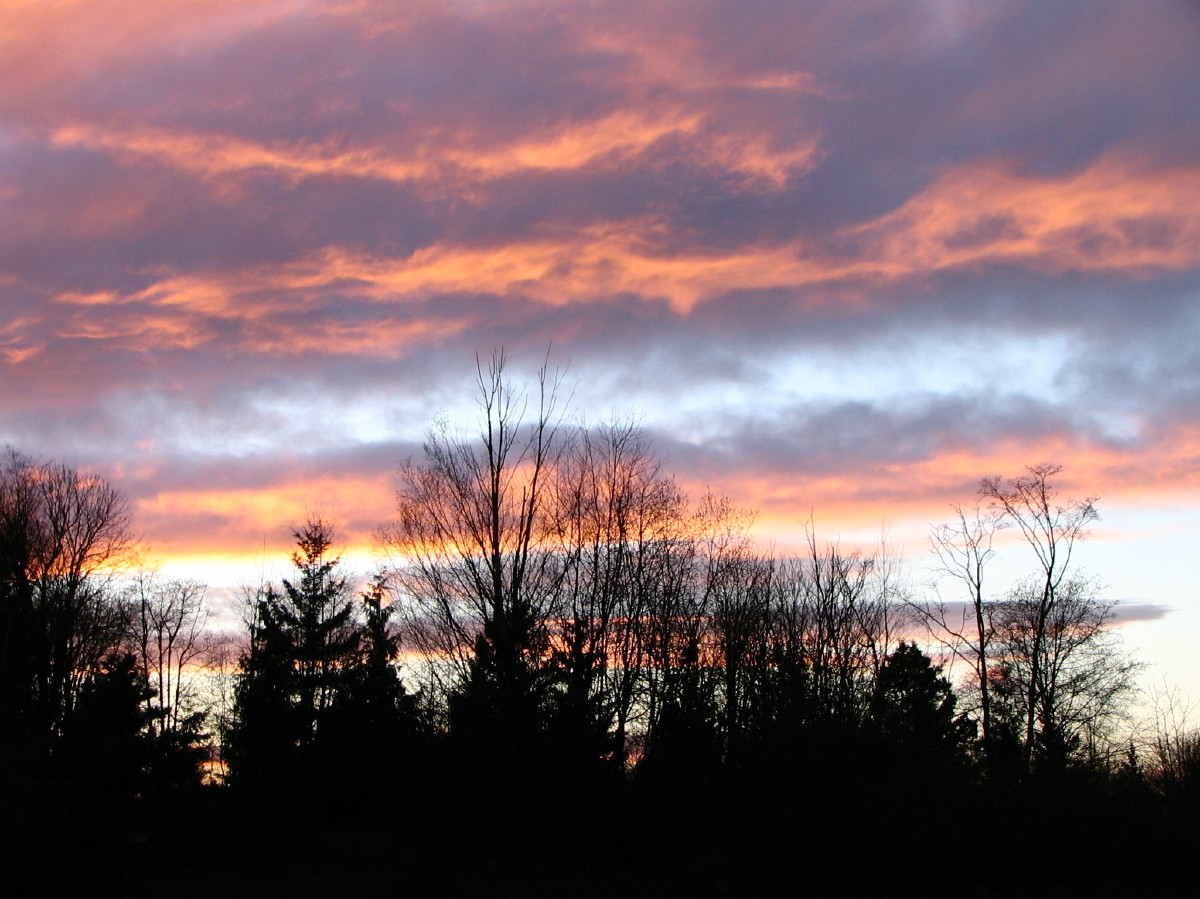
- Sunset in Kensington park

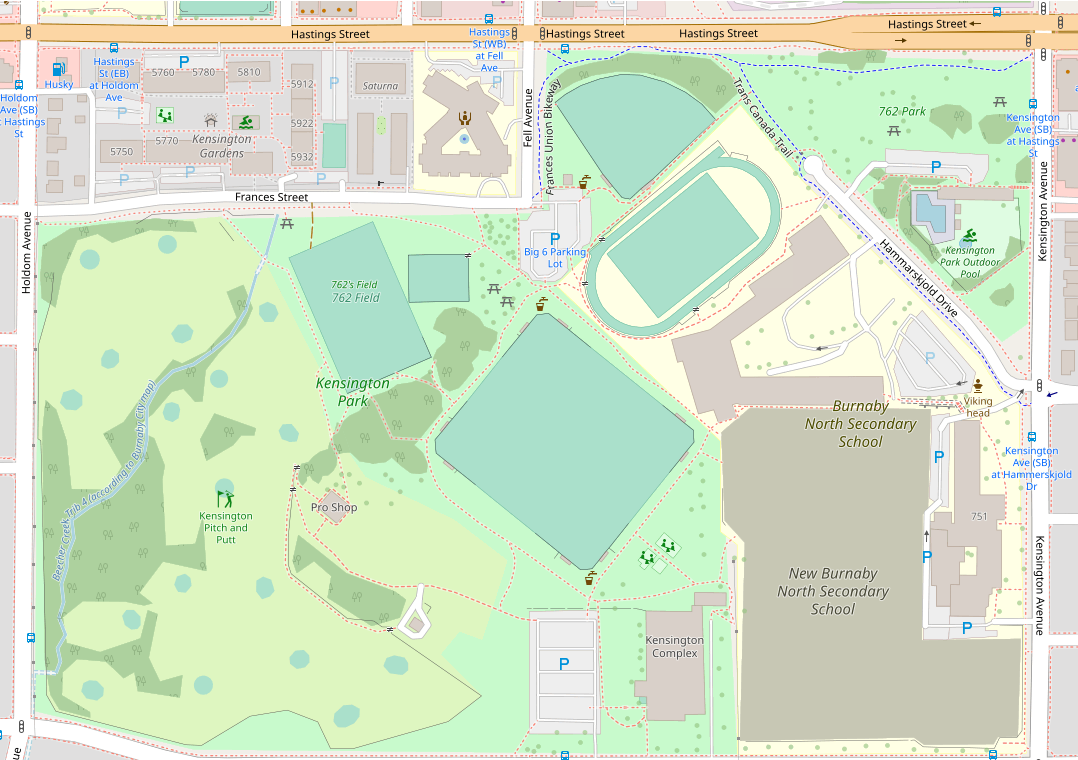
- Map of Kensington Park
- Type: Public park
- Location: Burnaby, British Columbia
- Coordinates: 49°16′38″N 122°58′37″W
- Operator: Burnaby Department of Parks, Recreation, and Culture
- Status: Open all year

Kensington Park is a large urban park in Burnaby, British Columbia, Canada. It is located between four major roads running along its perimeter—Hastings Street, Curtis Street, Kensington Avenue and Holdom Avenue.

Kensington Park borders Burnaby North Secondary School, whose grounds include several sports fields for soccer and baseball. Kensington Arena, a neighbourhood ice rink, sits at the park's entrance.

Kensington Park is mostly known for its pitch and putt facilities which attract many Burnaby golfers.

Beecher Creek, one of the streams in North Burnaby, winds its way through Kensington Park; following years of habitat restoration efforts, the creek experienced the return of spawning Chum, Coho, and Cutthroat Trout in the 2010s.

There is a provincial environmental monitoring station in the park.
