= Canadian Ski Hall of Fame =

Coordinates: 45.396726°N 75.74996°W

The Canadian Ski Hall of Fame (French: Le Temple de la renommée du ski canadien) was created by the Canadian Ski Museum in 1982 to honour skiing pioneers, competitors, coaches, officials, and builders.

== List of inductees ==
* Denotes deceased

=== A ===
- Dennis Adkin, 1983*
- Pierre Alain, 1984
- Verne Anderson, 1990*
- Peter Andrews, 1994
- Marie-Claude Asselin, 1991
- Greg Athans, 2008*

=== B ===
- William L. Ball, 1982*
- Lucie Barma, 2004
- Bob Bartley, 1983
- Myriam Bedard, 2001
- Felix Belczyk, 1998
- André Bertrand, 1989
- Alexandre Bilodeau, 2020
- Réal Boulanger, 2019
- Rob Boyd, 2000
- Jean-Luc Brassard, 2008
- Todd Brooker, 1991
- Jean-Guy Brunet, 1999
- Horst Bulau, 1994

=== C ===
- Gordon Canning, 2020
- Bruce Carnall, 1985*
- Owen Carney, 2004
- Ed Champagne, 1995
- Currie Chapman, 1993
- Real Charette, 1993*
- Jacques Charland, 1990
- Philip Chew, 2020
- W.G. Clark, 1982*
- H.T. "Sam" Cliff, 1982*
- John Clifford, 1982*
- Elisabeth Betsy Clifford 1982
- Harvey Clifford, 1988*
- Remi Cloutier, 1997
- Emile Cochand, 1983*
- Louis Cochand, 1986
- Steve Collins, 1995
- Chandra Crawford, 2019
- Judy Crawford-Rawley, 1995
- Linda Crutchfield, 1984

=== D ===
- Sidney Dawes, 1982*
- Michel Dehouck, 1982*
- W.F.C. Devlin, 1982*
- H.Percy Douglas, 1982*
- Peter Duncan, 1986

=== E ===
- John Eaves, 1988

=== F ===
- Dr. Douglas Firth, 1983*
- Sharon Firth, 1990
- Shirley Firth, 1990
- Joseph Fitzgerald, 2020
- Nicolas Fontaine, 2007
- Anna Fraser (-Sproule,) 1996
- John Fripp, 1988
- Shaun Fripp, 2009
- John Fry, 2018*

=== G ===
- Hermann Gadner, 1993*
- Meredith Gardner, 1995
- Max Gartner, 2007
- Gault Gillespie, 1987*
- Bob Gilmour 2003
- Hans Gmoser 1989*
- Robert W. Gooch, 1984*
- Russell Goodman, 2018
- Laurie Graham, 1991
- Thomas Grandi, 2018
- Nancy Greene (-Raine,) 1992
- Louis Grimes, 1986*
- H. Rae Grinnell, 1987

=== H ===
- Fred Hall, 1983*
- Martin Hall, 2018
- Pierre Harvey, 1992
- Ellis Hazen, 1982*
- Anne Heggtveit (-Hamilton,) 1982
- Jennifer Heil, 2019
- Scott Henderson, 1989
- Jim Hunter, 1987
- Malcolm Hunter, 2019

=== I ===
- Bill Irwin, 2000
- Dave Irwin, 1992
- Mike Irwin, 2019

=== J ===
- Dave Jacobs, 1988
- Olaus Jeldness, 1988*
- Piotr Jelen, 2009
- John Johnston, 1995
- Jerry Johnston, 1991
- Peter Judge, 1996

=== K ===
- Bill Keenan, 2001
- Andrzej Kozbial, 2000*
- Laurie Kreiner, 2010
- Kathy Kreiner (-Phillips), 1984
- John Kucera, 2018

=== L ===
- Mark Labow, 2010
- Raymond Lanctot, 1994*
- Roger Langley, 1986*
- Lloyd Langlois, 2002
- Alain LaRoche, 1999
- Philippe LaRoche 1998
- Yves LaRoche, 1992
- J. Ross Larway, 1984*
- Kerrin Lee-Gartner, 1996
- Sigurd Lockeberg, 1982*
- Sir Arnold Lunn, 1990*
- Don Lyon, 1994

=== M ===
- Darrell MacLachlan, 2020
- Norman MacTaggart, 1985*
- Karl Martitsch, 1996*
- Jim McConkey, 2001
- Ernie F. McCulloch, 1984*
- Lorne McFadgen, 2019
- Ashleigh McIvor, 2019
- Arnold Midgley, 1993
- Fred Morris, 1993*
- LeeLee Morrison, 1997
- C.E. Mortureux, 1982*
- Cary Mullen, 2002
- Dave Murray, 1990*

=== N ===
- Heinz Neiderhauser, 2010
- Nels Nelsen, 1983*
- Keith Nesbitt, 1991

=== O ===
- Lorne O'Connor, 1992

=== P ===
- Kate Pace-Lindsay, 2001
- A.H. Pangman, 1983*
- Christian Percival (née Percival Bott), 1987*
- Karen Percy (-Lowe,) 1992
- Bjorger Pettersen, 2007
- Doug Pfeiffer, 2000
- Francois Pichard, 1983
- Gaby Pleau, 1984*
- Steve Podborski, 1988
- Edi Podivinsky, 2007
- Fraser Pullen, 2004
- Dave Pym, 2008

=== R ===
- Al Raine, 1988
- Patricia Ramage, C.M. 1989*
- Dorothy Read, 2001*
- Ken Read, 1987
- Dave Rees, 2003
- Ron Richards, 1999
- Bob Richardson, 1997*
- Chris Robinson, 2009
- Katie Ronson, 1985*
- Jean-Marc Rozon, 1997
- Joe Ryan, 1982*

=== S ===
- Pepi Salvenmoser, 1990
- Liisa Savijarvi, 1997
- Angela Schmidt-Foster, 1996
- William B. Schreiber, 2019
- Beckie Scott, 2010
- Clarence L. Servold, 1984
- Irvin Servold, 1985
- Chris Simboli, 1993
- John Smart, 2003
- Herman Smith-Johannsen, 1982*
- Hugh Smythe, 2010
- Gerry Sorensen (-Lenihan), 1988
- Henry Sotvedt, 1983*
- Jimmie Spencer, 2010
- Brian Stemmle, 2002
- Robert Swan, 2018

=== T ===
- W.B. Thompson, 1982*
- William P. Tindale, 1990*
- Andrew Tommy, 1990*
- Arthur Tommy, 1989*
- Melanie Turgeon, 2007

=== U ===
- Fred Urquhart, 1989*

=== W ===
- Freda Wales, 1985*
- Richard Weber, 1997
- Peter W. Webster, 2003
- Jozo Weider, 1983*
- Harry Wheeler, 1986*
- Lucile Wheeler (-Vaughan), 1982
- Clifford White, 1983*
- Mike Wiegele, 2000
- Franz Wilhelmsen, 1996*
- Karolina Wisniewska, 2007
- Wayne Wong, 2009
- Dave Wood, 2020
- Lauren Woolstencroft, 2019
- Rhoda Wurtele (-Eaves), 1982
- Rhona Wurtele (-Gillis), 1982

* Denotes deceased

== See also ==
- List of ski areas and resorts in Canada
- List of skiing topics
