= Wayne Wong (skier) =

Canadian freestyle skier

Personal information
- Born: October 17, 1950 (age 75) Vancouver, British Columbia

Sport
- Sport: Skiing

Wayne Wong (born October 17, 1950) is a Canadian pioneer of freestyle skiing, and an inductee into both the Canadian Ski Hall of Fame and the U.S. Ski and Snowboard Hall of Fame.

Born in Vancouver, British Columbia, Wong was introduced to skiing in 1961. Wayne’s parents enrolled him in an eight-week ski program with the local parks and recreation department.

Wong is considered one of the most influential skiers of the 20th century, according to both SKI and Powder magazines. He is the inventor of the famous "Wong Banger" and starred in countless skiing movies. Wong is also the person credited with introducing future Tour de France champion Greg LeMond to the sport of cycling in 1975.

== Professional accomplishments ==
1971: 3rd place in the inaugural National Championships of Exhibition Skiing
1972: Skiing magazine Freestyle Skier Of The Year
1972: Achieved a Level 4 Certification with the Canadian Ski Instructors Alliance
1972–76: Member of the K2 and Salomon Freestyle Ski Teams
1973: Europa Cup Freestyle Champion
1973: Featured in a national TV ad for Pepsi Cola
1974: Rocky Mountain Freestyle Skiing Champion
1975: Member of the Canadian Ski Instructors Alliance Interski Team
1975: Japan International Freestyle Skiing Championships
1984; 1986; 1987: World Powder 8 Champion
1999: Recognized in Skiing Magazine's 50th Anniversary Issue as one of the 25 Most Influential Skiers Of All time
2000: Voted by Ski Magazine as one of the Top 100 Skiers Of All Time
2002: Olympic Torch Bearer for the 2002 Olympic Games
2004: Receive the Guardian Angel Award for his dedication to the Cystic Fibrosis Foundation
2006: Named in Powder Magazine's 35th Anniversary Issue as one of the Top 48 Greatest Skiers Of Our Time
2008: Received the Frances Williams Preston Award for his dedication to the Vanderbilt-Ingram Cancer Research Center
2008: Appeared in Fred Ashman's Imax movie, "Proud American"
2009: Inducted into the Canadian Ski Hall of Fame
