= Advanced Placement Awards =

Awards offered by the College Board (US)

The College Board offers several awards to selected students who take Advanced Placement (AP) exams.

== AP scholar designations ==
Each year, the AP program recognizes students who have performed exceptionally well on AP examinations. Exams are taken in May and awards are usually granted in July. The following designations can be earned:

AP Scholar Awards
Designation	Criteria
AP Scholar	Scores of 3 or better on three or more AP exams
AP Scholar with Honor	Scores of 3 or better on four or more AP exams and an average of 3.25 on all^{†} AP exams taken
AP Scholar with Distinction	Scores of 3 or better on five or more AP exams and an average of 3.5 on all AP exams taken
National AP Scholar*	Scores of 4 or better on eight or more AP exams and an average of 4 on all AP exams. Must be a student in the United States.
National AP Scholar (Canada)*	Scores of 4 or better on five or more AP exams and an average of 4 on all AP exams taken. Must be a student in Canada.
National AP Scholar (Bermuda)*	Scores of 4 or better on five or more AP exams and an average of 4 on all AP exams taken. Must be a student in Bermuda.

Previously, State AP Scholar Awards were distributed to the top male and female student of each state. However, the State AP Scholar awards were discontinued as of the May 2020 administration.

* The National AP Scholar Awards were also discontinued following the May 2020 administration.

† "All AP exams taken" refers to all AP exams taken in any year. It is not restricted to the year in which the award is issued.

== AP International Diploma ==
The AP program also awards the AP International Diploma (APID) for overseas study to students who have applied to colleges outside of the United States that have completed a sequence of AP exams with satisfactory scores. Prior to May 2006, a student had to earn a score of three or better on five or more AP exams in three of the five subject areas shown in the table below, with certain subject area requirements. As of May 2006, the College Board had implemented new requirements for awarding the AP International Diploma.

AP International Diploma
Course area	Exams
Languages	English Language & Composition; English Literature & Composition; French Language; German Language; Latin; Spanish Language; Spanish Literature; Chinese Language and Culture; Italian Language and Culture; Japanese Language and Culture
Sciences	Biology; Chemistry; Environmental Science; Physics 1; Physics 2; Physics C: Mechanics; Physics C: Electricity and Magnetism
Mathematics	Precalculus; Calculus AB; Calculus BC; Statistics; Computer Science A; Computer Science Principles
Social Studies	African American Studies; Human Geography; Comparative Government and Politics; United States Government and Politics; European History; United States History; World History; Macroeconomics; Microeconomics; Psychology
Fine Arts	Art History; Music Theory; Studio Art
