= Canadian Ski Museum =

- Established: 1975
- Type: sport museum
- Director: Ivo Krupka
- Website: www.skimuseum.ca

The Canadian Ski Museum (French: Le Musée canadien du ski) is a museum based in Mont-Tremblant, Quebec. It was founded in 1971 by a dedicated group of volunteers and ski enthusiasts. Shortly thereafter, in 1975 the museum was incorporated. Since 2011 it has left the Ottawa location with collection online or stored.

The museum's founders recognized the rapid expansion and development of the sport of skiing over the years; this inspired them to collect not only the material and artifacts related to skiing, but also the various stories associated with the early years.

Upon the museum's opening, Herman 'Jackrabbit' Smith-Johannsen acted as the Patron of the Canadian Ski Museum, and donated several of his prize possessions to the collection. Within the museum exhibit is an area devoted to 'Jackrabbit', the protagonist and practitioner of cross country and wilderness skiing.

The museum has a collection of photographs, memorabilia, skis, poles and ski clothing donated by skiers.

At present, volunteers, supported by a small paid staff, carry out the museum's activities. The museum relies on the support of friends and donors to continue to preserve and present Canadian Ski Heritage.

The Canadian Ski Museum is a registered Canadian Charity and governed by a board of directors, operating through the chair of the board and an executive committee. The Canadian Ski Museum is recognized by the Fédération Internationale de Ski ("FIS") the International Ski Federation.

== Sources ==
- Virtual Museum of Canada
- Pacific Rim Snow Sports Alliance
- Canadian Museum of Civilization
- International Skiing Heritage Association
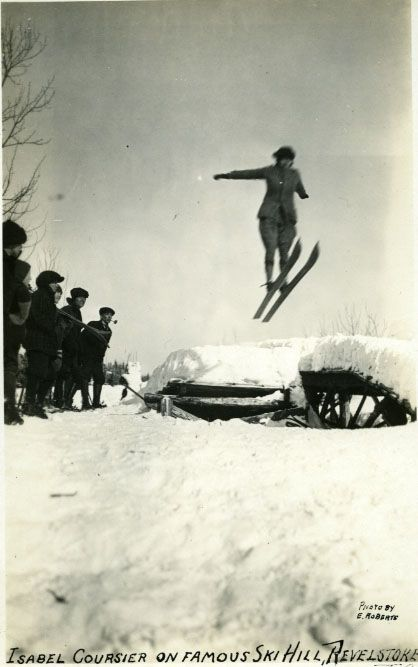
Isabel Coursier at Big Hill ski jump in Revelstoke, British Columbia, Canada

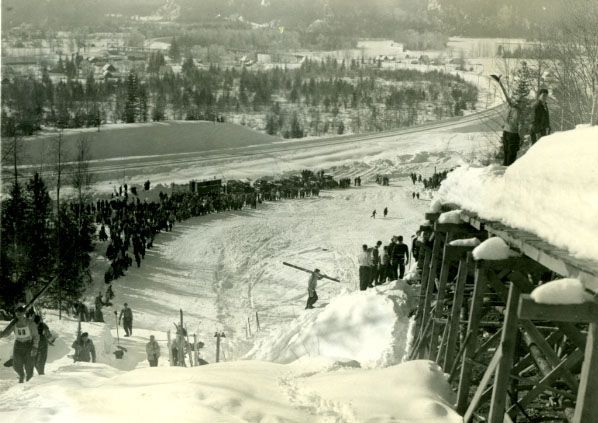
Big Bend Ski Jump in Revelstoke, British Columbia, Canada 1947

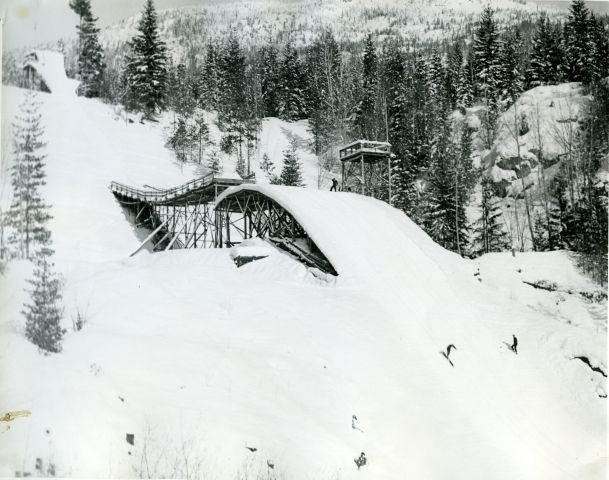
Big Bend Ski Jump in Revelstoke, British Columbia, Canada 1939

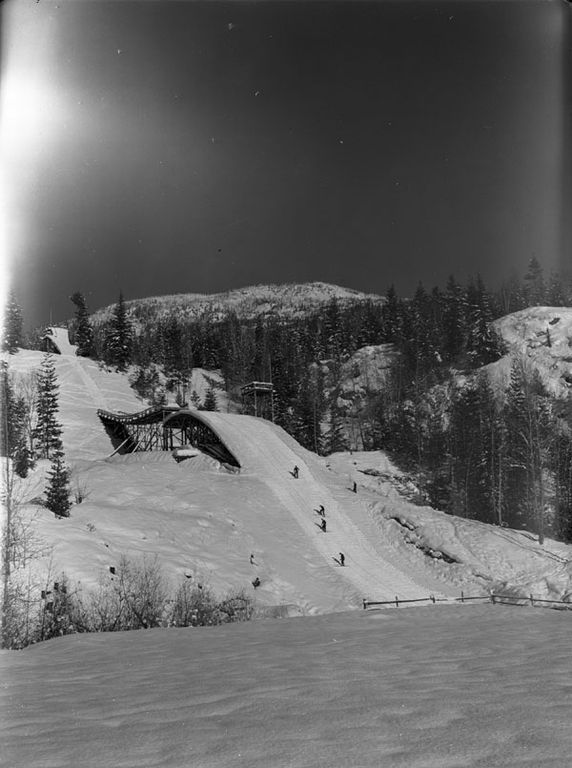
Big Bend Ski Jump in Revelstoke, British Columbia, Canada 1940s

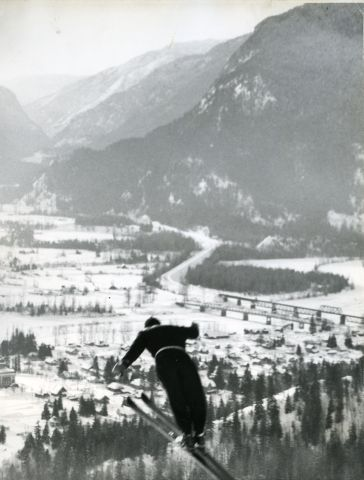
Big Bend Ski Jump in Revelstoke, British Columbia, Canada

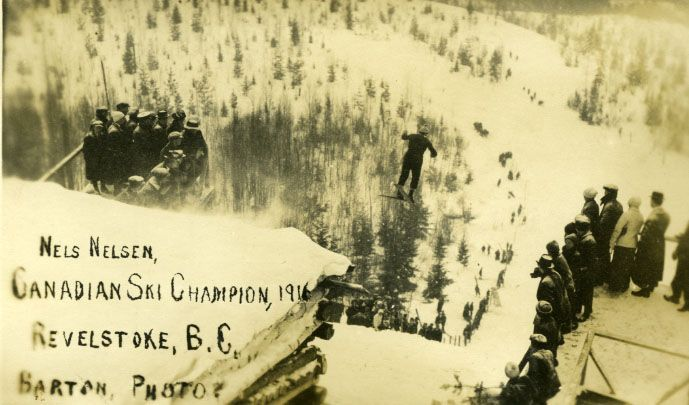
Big Bend ski jump in Revelstoke, British Columbia, Canada 1916

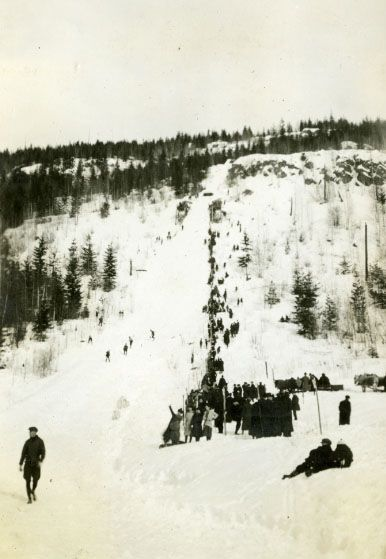
Big Hill ski jump in Revelstoke, British Columbia, Canada 1916

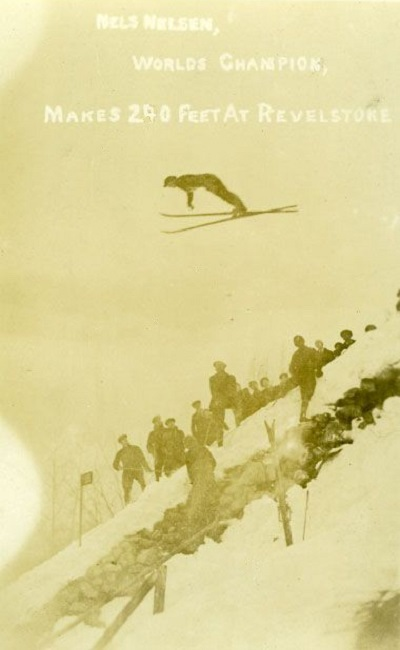
Nels Nelsen sets world record at Revelstoke British Columbia, 1925

== See also ==
- Pierre Harvey
- Jackrabbit Johannsen
- Nancy Greene
- Canadian Ski Patrol
